= HS-376 =

Communications satellite bus

Boeing 376
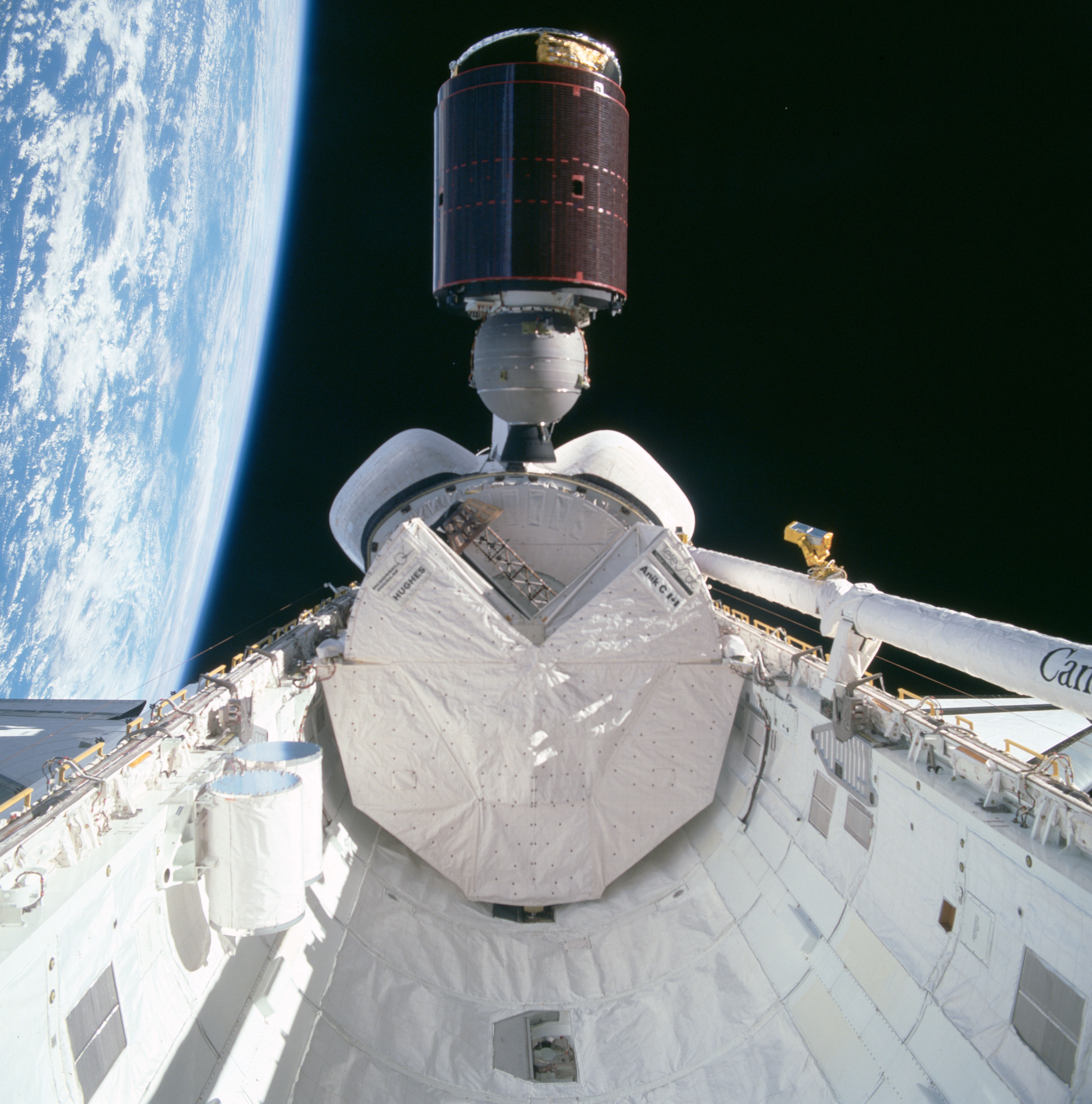
- HS-376 in launch configuration, on a space shuttle, with its antenna closed and lower solar panel retracted
- Manufacturer: Boeing Satellite Development Center
- Country of origin: United States
- Applications: Communications satellite

Specifications
- Spacecraft type: Spin-stabilized
- Power: 800 to 2,000 Watts

Production
- Status: Retired
- On order: 58
- Built: 58
- Launched: 58
- Retired: 56
- Failed: 2
- Maiden launch: Anik C1 April 12, 1985
- Last launch: eBird 1 September 27, 2003

Related spacecraft
- Derived from: HS-333
- Derivatives: HS-393

The Boeing 376 (sometimes referred to as the BSS-376, and previously as the HS-376) is a communications satellite bus introduced in 1978 by Hughes Space and Communications Company. It was a spin-stabilized bus, a successor to Hughes HS-333.

== Design ==
The satellite bus was designed and manufactured by Hughes. This spin-stabilized platform had two main sections. The spinning section was kept rotating at 50 rpm to maintain attitude, and a despun section was used by the payload to maintain radio coverage.

The spinning section included the apogee kick motor, most of the attitude control, the power subsystem and the command and telemetry subsystems. The despun section contained the communications payload, including the antennas and transponders.

The stock version had a launch mass of 1,100 to 1,450 kg (2,430 to 3,200 lb), a mass of 540 to 790 kg (1,190 to 1,740 lb) after reaching geostationary orbit and an 8 to 10-year design life. When stowed for launch, its dimensions were 2.8 to 3.15 m (9 ft 2 in to 10 ft 4 in) in height and 2.16 m (7 ft 1 in) in diameter. With its solar panels fully extended its height was 6.6 to 8 m (22 to 26 ft).

Its power system generated approximately 1,100 to 1,200 watts of power at beginning of life, thanks to two cylindrical solar panels. The bottom panel was retracted around the body and top panel for launch, and extended downwards for operation. It also had two NiCd batteries for solar eclipses.

== Versions ==
There were four variations of this platform:

- HS-376: The original version of the platform was launched in 1977. It had a mass between 1.1 to 1.45 t (1.21 to 1.60 tons).
- HS-376L: The Longer life version of the platform was launched in 1991. It had reduced power of 700 Watts and reduced electronics weight, which allowed for increased station keeping propellant supply. This lengthened the design life to 13.5 years.
- HS-376HP: A Higher Power version of the platform was launched in 1995. It had a mass between 1.45 to 1.55 t (1.60 to 1.71 tons).
- HS-376W: The Wide version of the platform was launched in 1990. It was wider, more powerful and modernized electronics. It was a joint development with INPE. It had a diameter of 3.43 m (11.3 ft) and more power.

== Satellites ==
The HS-376 was a very successful satellite platform with 58 satellites ordered, built and launched. It was also the first satellite to launch from the Space Shuttle.

Satellite	Other names	Operator	Model	Ordered	Launch	Launch vehicle	Launch result	Mass (kg) at...		Remarks
Satellite	Other names	Operator	Model	Ordered	Launch	Launch vehicle	Launch result	Launch	BOL	Remarks
SBS 1			HS-376	1977	1980-11-15	Delta-3910/PAM-D	Success	1117	540	
SBS 2			HS-376	1977	1981-09-24	Delta-3910/PAM-D	Success	1117	540	
Westar 4			HS-376	1980	1982-02-26	Delta-3910/PAM-D	Success	1100	582	
Westar 5			HS-376	1982	1982-06-09	Delta-3910/PAM-D	Success	1100	582	
Anik D1			HS-376		1982-08-26	Delta-3920/PAM-D	Success	1140	634	
Anik C3			HS-376	1978	1982-11-11	Shuttle/PAM-D	Success	1140	563	
SBS 3			HS-376	1981	1982-11-11	Shuttle/PAM-D	Success	1117	540	
Anik C2	Nahuel I2		HS-376	1978	1983-06-18	Shuttle/PAM-D	Success	1140	563	
Palapa B1	Palapa Pacific 1		HS-376	1980	1983-06-18	Shuttle/PAM-D	Success	1200	692	
Galaxy 1			HS-376		1983-06-28	Delta-3920/PAM-D	Success	1200	709	
Telstar 301	Arabsat-1E		HS-376	1980	1983-07-28	Delta-3920/PAM-D	Success	1140	653	
Galaxy 2			HS-376		1983-09-22	Delta-3920/PAM-D	Success	1200	709	
Palapa B2			HS-376	1980	1984-02-03	Shuttle/PAM-D	PAM ignition failed, satellite recovered	1200	692	Launched along Westar 6. PAM-D failed to ignite, Shuttle recovered the satellite. Was relaunched as Palapa B2R.
Westar 6			HS-376		1984-02-03	Shuttle/PAM-D	PAM ignition failed, satellite recovered	1244	582	Launched along Palapa B2. PAM-D failed to ignite, Shuttle recovered the satellite. Was relaunched as AsiaSat 1.
SBS 4	HGS 5		HS-376	1983	1984-08-30	Shuttle/PAM-D	Success	1117	540	
Telstar 302			HS-376	1980	1984-08-30	Shuttle/PAM-D	Success	1140	653	
Galaxy 3			HS-376		1984-09-21	Delta-3920/PAM-D	Success	1200	709	
Anik D2	Satcom 4R; Arabsat 1D		HS-376		1984-11-08	Shuttle/PAM-D	Success	1140	634	
Brasilsat-A1	SBTS 1		HS-376	1982	1985-02-08	Ariane 3	Success	1195	—	
Anik C1	Nahuel I1; Brasil 1T		HS-376	1978	1985-04-12	Shuttle/PAM-D	Success	1140	563	
Morelos 1			HS-376	1982	1985-06-17	Shuttle/PAM-D	Success	1140	647	
Telstar 303			HS-376	1980	1985-06-17	Shuttle/PAM-D	Success	1140	653	
Aussat A1	Optus A1		HS-376	1982	1985-08-27	Shuttle/PAM-D	Success	1250	654	
Aussat A2	Optus A2		HS-376	1982	1985-11-27	Shuttle/PAM-D	Success	1250	654	
Morelos 2			HS-376	1982	1985-11-27	Shuttle/PAM-D	Success	1140	647	
Brasilsat-A2	SBTS 2		HS-376	1982	1986-03-28	Ariane 3	Success	1195	—	
Palapa B2P	Palapa B3; Agila 1		HS-376	1984	1987-03-20	Delta-3920/PAM-D	Success	1200	692	
Aussat A3	Optus A3		HS-376	1982	1987-09-16	Ariane 3	Success	1250	696	
SBS 5			HS-376	1983	1988-09-08	Ariane 3	Success	1117	540	
Marcopolo 1	Sirius 1 Sirius W		HS-376	1987	1989-08-27	Delta-4925	Success	1250	660	
AsiaSat 1			HS-376		1990-04-07	Long March 3	Success	1244	582	Was Westar 6, but the launch on Space Shuttle failed. It was recovered and launched again as AsiaSat 1.
Palapa B2R	NewSat 1		HS-376		1990-04-13	Delta-6925-8	Success	1200	692	Was Palapa B2, but the launch on Space Shuttle failed. It was recovered and launched again as Palapa B2R.
Marcopolo 2	Thor 1		HS-376	1987	1990-08-18	Delta-6925-8	Success	1250	662	
Prowler			HS-376		1990-11-15	Shuttle/PAM-D	Success	—	—	
Galaxy 5			HS-376	1989	1992-03-14	Atlas I	Success	1390	788	
Palapa B4			HS-376		1992-05-14	Delta-7925-8	Success	1200	692	
Galaxy 1R			HS-376	1989	1992-08-22	Atlas I	Failure	1390	788	Launch failure
Galaxy 6	Westar 6S		HS-376	1983	1992-10-12	Ariane-44L	Success	1390	709	
Thaicom 1	Thaicom 1A		HS-376L	1991	1993-12-18	Ariane-44L	Success	1080	629	
Galaxy 1R2			HS-376	1992	1994-02-19	Delta-7925-8	Success	1390	788	
APSTAR-1	ZX-5E		HS-376	1992	1994-07-21	Long March 3	Success	1400	726	
Brasilsat B1			HS-376W	1990	1994-08-10	Ariane-44LP	Success	1757	1052	
Thaicom 2			HS-376L	1991	1994-10-07	Ariane-44L	Success	1080	629	
Brasilsat B2			HS-376W	1990	1995-03-28	Ariane-44LP	Success	1757	1052	
MEASAT-1	AFRICASAT-1		HS-376	1994	1996-01-12	Ariane-44L	Success	1450	886	
Galaxy 9			HS-376	1995	1996-05-24	Delta-7925	Success	1390	788	
APSTAR-1A	ZX-5D		HS-376	1995	1996-07-03	Long March 3	Success	1400	726	
ZX 7	Chinasat-7; HGS 2		HS-376	1995	1996-08-18	Long March 3	Failure	1384	734	Launch failure
MEASAT-2	AFRICASAT-2		HS-376	1994	1996-11-13	Ariane-44L	Success	1450	886	
BSAT-1a			HS-376	1993	1997-04-16	Ariane-44LP	Success	1236	723	
Thor 2			HS-376HP	1995	1997-05-20	Delta-7925	Success	1467	853	
Brasilsat B3			HS-376W	1995	1998-02-04	Ariane-44LP	Success	1757	1052	
BSAT-1b			HS-376	1993	1998-04-28	Ariane-44P	Success	1236	723	
Thor 3			HS-376HP	1997	1998-06-10	Delta-7925	Success	1451	853	
Sirius 3			HS-376HP	1997	1998-10-05	Ariane-44L	Success	1465	815	
Bonum 1			HS-376HP	1997	1998-11-22	Delta-7925	Success	1425	793	
Brasilsat B4			HS-376W	1998	2000-08-17	Ariane-44LP	Success	1757	1052	
Astra 2D			HS-376HP	1999	2000-12-20	Ariane 5G	Success	1445	824	
Astra 3A			HS-376HP	2000	2002-03-29	Ariane-44L	Success	1514	908	
eBird 1	Eurobird 3 Eutelsat 33A; Eutelsat 31A		HS-376HP	2000	2003-09-27	Ariane 5G	Success	1530	895	

== See also ==
- Boeing 601
- Boeing Satellite Development Center
