= AsiaSat 1 =

AsiaSat communications satellite

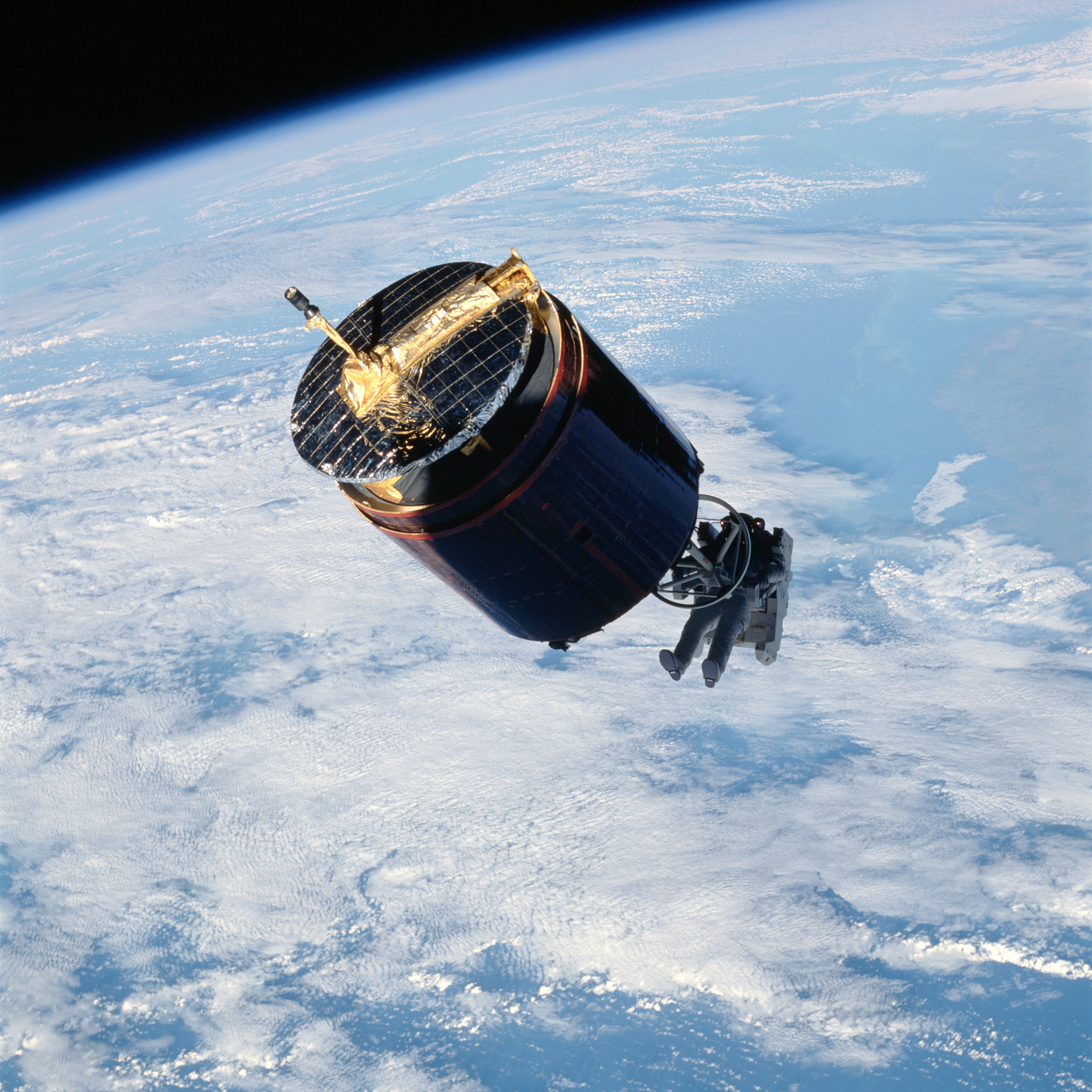
- AsiaSat 1 (then Westar 6) being retrieved by Space Shuttle mission STS-51-A
- Names: Westar 6
- Mission type: Communications
- Operator: AsiaSat
- COSPAR ID: 1990-030A
- SATCAT no.: 20558
- Website: https://www.asiasat.com
- Mission duration: 9 years (planned); 12.5 years (achieved)

Spacecraft properties
- Spacecraft: AsiaSat-1
- Bus: HS-376
- Manufacturer: Hughes Space and Communications
- Launch mass: 1,244 kg (2,743 lb)
- Dry mass: 620 kg (1,370 lb)
- Dimensions: 2.16 m (7 ft 1 in) diameter 6.6 m (22 ft) height stowed: 2.84 m (9 ft 4 in)
- Power: 850 watts

Start of mission
- Launch date: 7 April 1990, 13:30:02 UTC
- Rocket: Long March 3
- Launch site: Xichang, LA-3
- Contractor: CGWIC
- Entered service: June 1990

End of mission
- Disposal: Graveyard orbit
- Deactivated: January 2003

Orbital parameters
- Reference system: Geocentric orbit
- Regime: Geostationary orbit
- Longitude: 100.5° East (1990–1999); 122° East (1999–2003)

Transponders
- Band: 24 C-band
- Bandwidth: 36 MHz
- Coverage area: Asia, Pacific Ocean

AsiaSat 1 was a Hong Kong communications satellite, which was owned, and was operated, by the Hong Kong–based Asia Satellite Telecommunications Company. It was originally launched in February 1984 as Westar 6, but following a booster motor failure it was retrieved and returned to Earth in November of that year by Space Shuttle mission STS-51-A. After being sold to AsiaSat and refurbished, it was relaunched in April 1990, and positioned in geostationary orbit at a longitude of 100.5° East. It spent its operational life at 100.5° East, from where it was used to provide fixed satellite services, including broadcasting, audio and data transmission, to Asia and the Pacific Ocean.

== Westar 6 ==
As Westar 6, the satellite was built by Hughes Space and Communications. It was based on the HS-376 satellite bus. At launch it had a mass of 1,244 kg (2,743 lb), and a design life of thirteen years. It carried twenty four C-band transponders. After launch from the Space Shuttle as part of mission STS-41-B its PAM-D booster rocket misfired, and the satellite was stranded in a useless low orbit. It was retrieved during another Shuttle mission (STS-51-A) in November 1984, and Hughes was contracted to refurbish it. Westar 6 was eventually sold, for US$58 million, to the AsiaSat consortium and renamed AsiaSat 1.

== Re-launch ==
The launch of AsiaSat 1 was contracted to the China Great Wall Industry Corporation (CGWIC), and used a Long March 3 launch vehicle. The launch was conducted from Xichang Launch Area 3 (LA-3) at the Xichang Satellite Launch Centre at 13:30:02 UTC on 7 April 1990.

== Mission ==
Asiasat 1 was replaced by AsiaSat 3S in May 1999. It remains in a graveyard orbit.

== See also ==
- Palapa B2, a communications satellite that was also retrieved and relaunched by the Space Shuttle
