= Frederick Hauck =

American naval captain and astronaut (1941–2025)

Rick Hauck
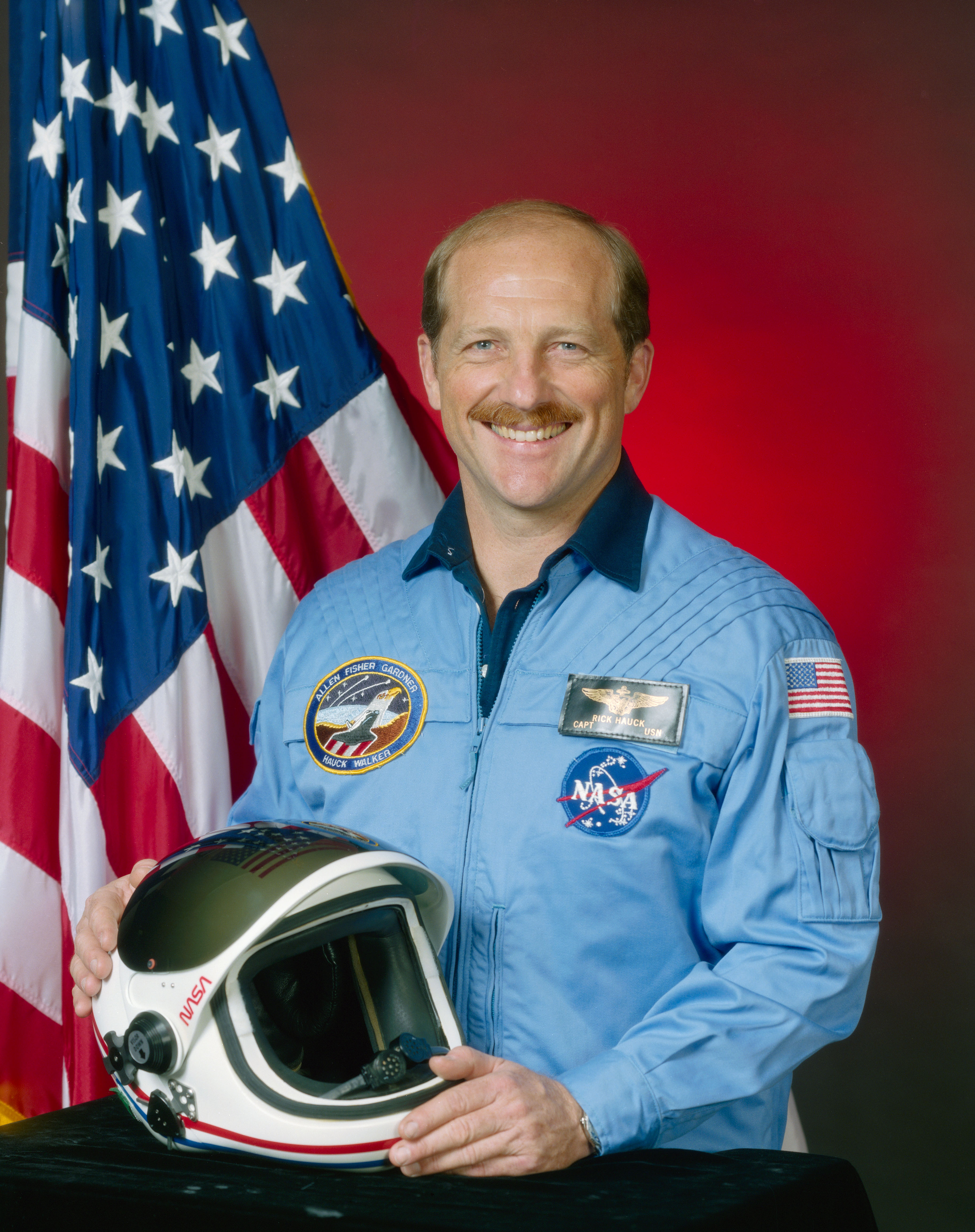
- Hauck in 1985
- Born: Frederick Hamilton Hauck; April 11, 1941; Long Beach, California, U.S.
- Died: November 6, 2025 (aged 84); Maine, U.S.
- Education: Tufts University (BS); Massachusetts Institute of Technology (MS)
- Awards: See list
- Space career

NASA astronaut
- Rank: Captain, USN
- Time in space: 18d 3h 7m
- Selection: NASA Group 8 (1978)
- Missions: STS-7; STS-51-A; STS-26
- Retired: April 3, 1989

Frederick Hamilton "Rick" Hauck (pronounced "Howk"; April 11, 1941 – November 6, 2025) was a captain in the United States Navy, fighter pilot and NASA astronaut. He piloted Space Shuttle mission STS-7 and commanded STS-51-A and STS-26.

== Background ==
Hauck was born on April 11, 1941, in Long Beach, California, but considered Winchester, Massachusetts, and Washington, D.C., to be his hometowns. His parents were the late Captain and Mrs. Phillip F. Hauck. His maternal grandfather, Olaf M. Hustvedt, was a United States Navy vice admiral who commanded battleships during World War II. As a child, Hauck was suggested to skip first and second grade. However, his mother felt concerned about the age difference between him and his classmates and instead only had him skip first grade.

He married his first wife, Dolly Bowman, in 1962. The couple had two children. The couple split on amicable terms in the late 1980s. Hauck was later married to Susan Cameron Bruce.

Hauck died on November 6, 2025, at a retirement home in Maine at the age of 84.

== Education ==
- 1958: Graduated from St. Albans School in Washington, D.C.
- 1962: Received a Bachelor of Science degree in physics from Tufts University. While attending Tufts he joined the Delta Upsilon fraternity.
- 1966: Received a Master of Science degree in nuclear engineering from the Massachusetts Institute of Technology
- 1971: Graduated U.S. Naval Test Pilot School

== Military experience ==
Hauck, a Naval ROTC student at Tufts University, was commissioned upon graduation in 1962 and reported to the destroyer USS Warrington, where he served 20 months as communications officer and Combat Information Center officer. Hauck was involved in the search for the submarine USS Thresher when it sank off the coast of Cape Cod in 1963. In 1964, he attended the U.S. Naval Postgraduate School, Monterey, California, for studies in mathematics and physics and for a brief time in 1965 studied the Russian language at the Defense Language Institute in Monterey. Selected for the Navy's Advanced Science Program, he received a master's degree in nuclear engineering from Massachusetts Institute of Technology the next year.

He commenced flight training at the Naval Air Station Pensacola, Florida, in 1966, and was designated a Naval Aviator, receiving his aviator wings in 1968. As a pilot with Attack Squadron 35 he deployed to the Western Pacific with Carrier Air Wing Fifteen aboard the aircraft carrier USS Coral Sea, flying 114 combat and combat support missions in the A-6 Intruder. In August 1970, Hauck joined Attack Squadron 42 as a visual weapons delivery instructor in the A-6 Intruder. Selected for test pilot training, he reported to the U.S. Naval Test Pilot School at NAS Patuxent River, Maryland in 1971. A 3-year tour in the Naval Air Test Center's Carrier Suitability Branch of the Flight Test Division followed. During this period, Hauck served as a project test pilot for automatic carrier landing systems in the RA-5 Vigilante, A-6 Intruder, A-7 Corsair II, F-4 Phantom and F-14 Tomcat aircraft and was team leader for the Navy Board of Inspection and Survey aircraft carrier trials of the F-14. In 1974, he reported as operations officer to commander, Carrier Air Wing Fourteen aboard USS Enterprise. On two cruises he flew the A-6, A-7, and F-14 during both day and night carrier operations. He reported to Attack Squadron 145 as Executive Officer in February 1977.

In May 1989, he became director, Navy Space Systems Division, in the Office of the Chief of Naval Operations. In this capacity, he held budgeting responsibility for the Navy's space programs. Captain Hauck left military active duty on June 1, 1990.

== NASA experience ==
NASA selected Hauck as an astronaut candidate in January 1978. He made an early impression on his fellow astronauts in his first days. Being one of the new TFNGs to sit at the table during his first morning astronaut meeting. Some thought he was either a fool or the most confident among the new candidates. He was assistant Crimson team CAPCOM for the first Space Shuttle mission re-entry. His first spaceflight was as pilot for STS-7, the seventh flight of the Space Shuttle, which launched from Kennedy Space Center, Florida, on June 18, 1983. The crew included Robert Crippen (spacecraft commander), and three mission specialists, John Fabian, Sally Ride, and Norm Thagard. This was the second flight for the orbiter Challenger and the first mission with a 5-person crew. During the mission, the STS-7 crew deployed satellites for Canada (ANIK-C2) and Indonesia (Palapa B-1); operated the Canadian-built Remote Manipulator System (RMS) to perform the first deployment and retrieval exercise (with the Shuttle Pallet Satellite (SPAS-01)); and with Crippen conducted the first piloting of the orbiter in close proximity to a free-flying satellite (SPAS-01). Mission duration was 147 hours before landing on a lakebed runway at Edwards Air Force Base, California, on June 24, 1983.

Hauck was spacecraft commander for the second mission of Discovery on mission STS-51-A, which launched on November 8, 1984. His crew included David M. Walker (astronaut) (pilot), and three mission specialists, Joseph Allen, Anna Fisher, and Dale Gardner. During the mission, the crew deployed two satellites, Telesat Canada's Anik D-2, and Hughes' LEASAT-1 (Syncom IV-1). In the first space salvage mission in history, the crew also retrieved for return to Earth the Palapa B-2 and Westar VI satellites. STS-51-A completed 127 orbits of the Earth before landing at Kennedy Space Center, Florida, on November 16, 1984.

In March 1985, Captain Hauck became the Astronaut Office project officer for the integration of the liquid-fueled Shuttle-Centaur upper-stage rocket. In May 1985, he was named commander of the Centaur-boosted Ulysses solar probe mission, STS-61-F (sponsored by the European Space Agency). It was set to launch in a tight launch window in May 1986. After the Challenger accident this mission was postponed, and the Shuttle-Centaur project was terminated.

In August 1986, Captain Hauck was appointed NASA associate administrator for external relations, the policy advisor to the NASA Administrator for congressional, public, international, inter-governmental, and educational affairs. He resumed his astronaut duties at the Johnson Space Center in early February 1987.

Hauck was spacecraft commander of Discovery on STS-26, the first flight to be flown after the Challenger accident. The mission launched on September 29, 1988. The flight crew included the pilot, Richard Covey, and three mission specialists, David Hilmers, Mike Lounge, and George Nelson. During the four-day mission, the crew deployed the Tracking and Data Relay Satellite (TDRS-C) and operated eleven mid-deck experiments. While in command of the flight, Hauck and the rest of the crew took time to honor those lost on Challenger. Hauck offered words of honor to his fallen friends, "Dear friends, we have resumed the journey that we promised to continue for you. Dear friends, your loss has meant that we could confidently begin anew. Dear friends, your spirit and your dreams are still alive in our heart." Discovery completed 64 orbits of the Earth before landing at Edwards Air Force Base, California, on October 3, 1988.

Hauck logged over 5,500 flight hours, 436 in space.

== Post-NASA experience ==
In October 1990, he joined AXA Space (formerly INTEC) as president and chief operating officer, and on January 1, 1993, assumed responsibilities as chief executive officer. AXA Space provides property and casualty insurance for the risk of launching and operating satellites. He retired from AXA Space in April 2005. Hauck was added to the board of directors for Cianbro, a Maine-based construction company, in 2010.

Hauck divorced Dolly Bowman in 1991. After his divorce, Hauck began dating Susan Bruce, also a former Tufts student he had known during his senior year. They married in 1993. Hauck acquired three stepdaughters from Susan's previous marriage.

In December 2023, Hauck published his memoir To Mach 25 and Home.

== Memberships, boards, and panels ==
- Fellow, Society of Experimental Test Pilots
- Fellow, American Institute of Aeronautics and Astronautics (AIAA)
- Board of Trustees, Tufts University (1987–)
- Board of Governors, St. Albans School (1989–95)
- Association of Space Explorers (Vice President, 1991–93; Board of Directors, 2000–20??)
- Technical Advisor to The Synthesis Group on America's Space Exploration Initiative (1990–91)
- Commercial Space Transportation Advisory Committee (COMSTAC), United States Department of Transportation (1992–99)
- Chair, COMSTAC Task Group on Russian Entry into Commercial Space Markets (1992)
- NASA Commercial Programs Advisory Committee (1991)
- Department of Commerce U.S. Space Commerce Mission to Russia (1992)
- NASA Mission Review Task Group (Space Salvage) (1992)
- General Dynamics Atlas Failure Review Oversight Boards (1992, 1993)
- U.S. Congress Office of Technology Assessment Advisory Panel on National Space Transportation Policy (1994–95)
- Chair, NASA External Independent Readiness Review Team for Second Hubble Space Telescope Servicing Mission (1995–97)
- National Research Council (NRC) Aeronautics and Space Engineering Board (1996–?)
- NRC Committee on International Space Station Meteoroid/Debris Risk Management (1995–1996)
- Chair, NRC Committee on Space Shuttle Meteoroid/Debris Risk Management (1997)
- Boeing Space Launch Mission Assurance Review Team (1999)
- External Requirements Assessment Team for NASA 2nd Generation Reusable Launch Vehicle Program (2000–20??)
- Chair, NRC Committee on Precursor Measurements Necessary to Support Human Operations on the Surface of Mars (2001–20??)
- Executive Committee, Astronaut Scholarship Foundation
- Board of Directors, American Astronautical Society (AAS) (1997–2000)
- Chair, Arts and Sciences Board of Overseers, Tufts University (1997–?)
- External Visiting Committee, Dept. of Aeronautics and Astronautics, Stanford Univ. (2001)
- Member, Space Foundation Board of Directors (2005–20??)

== Special honors ==
- Defense Distinguished Service Medal (second)
- Defense Superior Service Medal
- Legion of Merit
- Distinguished Flying Cross
- Air Medal (9)
- Navy Commendation Medal with Combat V (second)
- NASA Distinguished Service Medal
- NASA Medal for Outstanding Leadership
- NASA Space Flight Medal (third)
- Astronaut Hall of Fame
- US Navy Outstanding Test Pilot Award
- Presidential Cost Saving Commendation
- AIAA Haley Space Flight Award
- Lloyd's of London Silver Medal for Meritorious Service
- AAS Flight Achievement Awards (second)
- Fédération Aéronautique Internationale (FAI) Yuri Gagarin Gold Medal
- FAI Komarov Diploma (second)
- Tufts University Presidential Medal
- Tufts University Light on the Hill Award
- Delta Upsilon Distinguished Alumnus Award
- Who's Who in America
