= Westar =

Fleet of communications satellites

Westar was a fleet of geosynchronous communications satellites operating in the C band which were launched by Western Union from 1974 to 1984. There were seven Westar satellites in all, with five of them launched and operating under the Westar name.

== Background ==
Westar 1 (launched on April 13, 1974) has the distinction of being the USA's first commercially launched geosynchronous communications satellite, following North America's first geosynchronous communications satellite, Canada's Anik A1 in 1972. Westar 1 was put into orbit at 99° W in the Clarke belt (99° W now being the home of Galaxy 16).

Westar 2 was launched shortly afterward on October 10, 1974. Westar 3, the first satellite to use TDMA switched data, was launched on August 10, 1979. Westars 1, 2 and 3 were built by Hughes using the HS 333 platform of spin-scan stabilized satellites. They only had 12 transponders on board, as opposed to later C-band communications satellites having 24, and even contemporary satellites of the same era, such as RCA's Satcom 1.

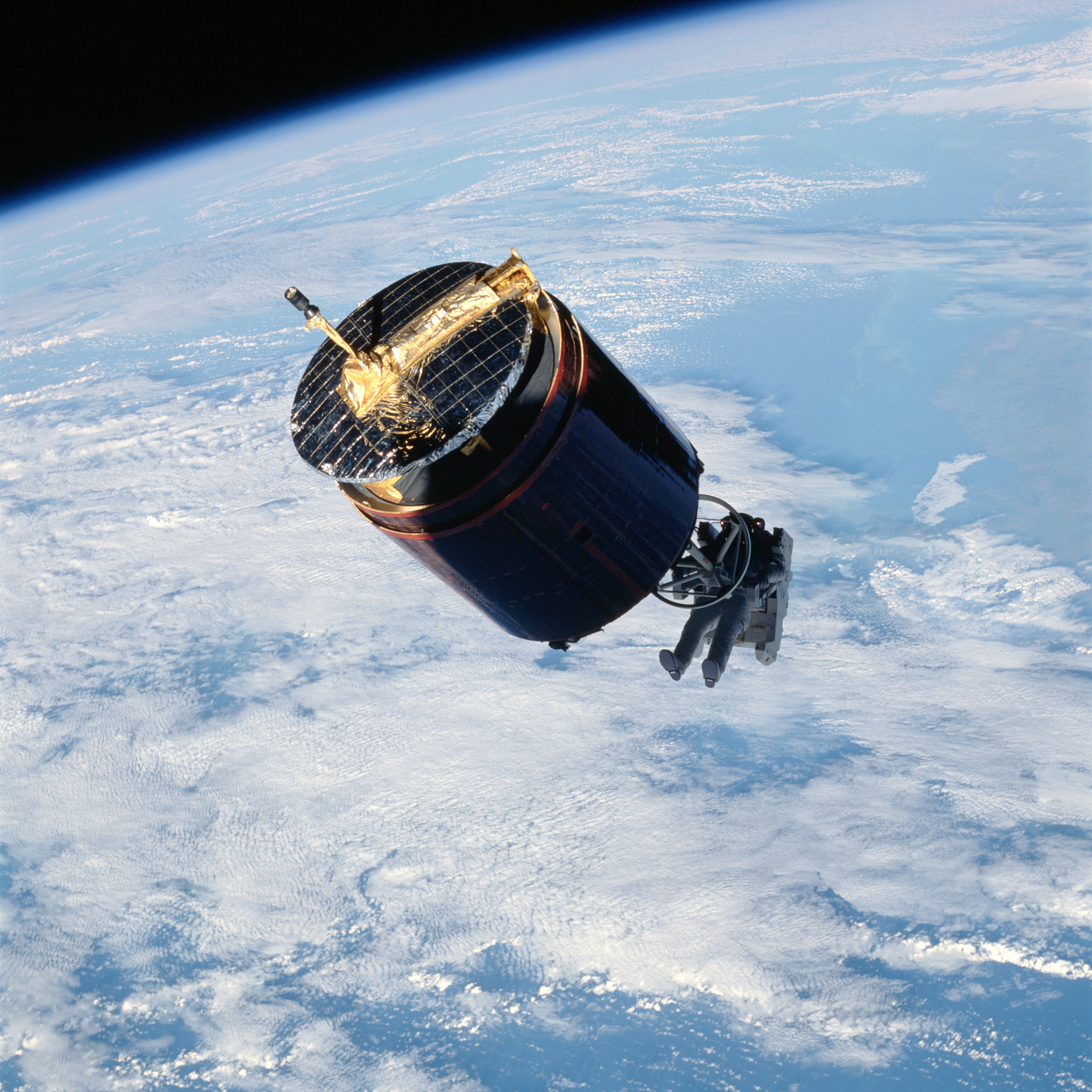
Westar 6 retrieval by Astronaut Dale Gardner

The later Westar 4 (launched on February 26, 1982) and Westar 5 (launched on June 9, 1982) satellites, were based on the Hughes HS-376 platform, and had 24 transponders available, as opposed to the 12 on Westars 1, 2, and 3.

Westar 6, also an HS-376 based satellite, was launched from STS-41-B on February 3, 1984, to be put into service afterward, but the perigee kick motor (also known as the Payload Assist Module, or PAM) on the satellite failed during its approach to geosynchronous orbit, placing it at an improper and inoperable low Earth orbit. It was retrieved on November 16, 1984, by the STS-51-A mission of NASA's Space Shuttle, where it was brought back to earth. It was then resold to AsiaSat in Hong Kong, who refurbished it and relaunched it on April 7, 1990 as AsiaSat 1 aboard a Long March 3 rocket. The Space Shuttle mission to retrieve Westar 6, as well as the Palapa B2 satellite which shared the launch payload with Westar 6, was partially funded by the insurance companies led by Lloyd's of London who insured the launch of those two satellites.

An on-ground spare satellite to Westar 6, Westar 6S, was in development by Western Union and Hughes when Western Union decided to divest themselves of their telecommunications-based assets starting in the early 1980s after suffering heavy financial losses. This resulted in Western Union selling the Westar satellite fleet and operations to Hughes in 1988.

Hughes then finished development of Westar 6S, and renamed it Galaxy 6. Modifications were made to it, and Galaxy 6 was launched on October 12, 1990.

Hughes later launched the Galaxy 4 satellite in 1992 and Galaxy 5 in 1993 to replace Westar 4 and 5 respectively, after the latter satellites reached the end of their useful life.

== Satellite fleet ==
Model	Satellite type	Launch date	Retired	Launch vehicle	COSPAR ID	Comments
Westar 1	Hughes Aircraft HS-333	13 April 1974	2 May 1983	Delta 2914	1974-022A	
Westar 2	Hughes Aircraft HS-333	10 October 1974	7 May 1986	Delta 2914	1974-075A	
Westar 3	Hughes Aircraft HS-333	10 August 1979	24 January 1990	Delta 2914	1979-072A	
Westar 4	Hughes Aircraft HS-376	26 February 1982	9 November 1991	Delta 3910 & PAM-D	1982-014A	Replaced Westar 1
Westar 5	Hughes Aircraft HS-376	9 June 1982	25 May 1992	Delta 3910 & PAM-D	1982-058A	Replaced Westar 2
Westar 6	Hughes Aircraft HS-376	3 February 1984	16 November 1984	Space Shuttle (STS-41-B) & PAM-D	1984-011B	Failed upon launch from Space Shuttle, retrieved by Space Shuttle STS-51-A after launch failure, refurbished & relaunched as AsiaSat 1 on 7 April 1990
Westar 6S	Hughes Aircraft HS-376	12 October 1990 (as Galaxy 6)	?? February 2003	Ariane 44L	1990-091B	Ground spare, refurbished and launched by Hughes as Galaxy 6 on 12 October 1990

== Uplink sites for Westar ==
During the life of the Westar fleet, Western Union operated these dedicated uplink sites (now defunct, unless noted) for Westar:

- The Yacolt earth station at Yacolt, Washington 45°51′47″N 122°23′44″W (45.8633,-122.3956). (now a satellite uplink site for Verizon Communications)
- The Sky Valley earth station, located near Cordelia, California 38°09′39″N 122°11′18″W (north of San Francisco)
- The Steele Valley earth station, near Perris, California 33°45′29″N 117°18′54″W (southeast of Los Angeles, now the location of Lumen Vyvx Teleport Los Angeles)
- The Kipapa earth station, near Waipio Acres, Hawaii 21°28′13″N 157°58′21″W
- The Cedar Hill earth station, at Cedar Hill, Texas (near Dallas) (now a satellite teleport station once again, as the headquarters of All Mobile Video's Westar Satellite Services division )
- The Estill Fork earth station, at Estill Fork, Alabama 34°54′30″N 86°09′46″W
- The Lake Geneva earth station, at Lake Geneva, Wisconsin 42°37′18″N 88°25′55″W (northwest of Chicago)
- and the Glenwood earth station at Glenwood, New Jersey 41°12′43″N 74°29′38″W. Glenwood was the head earth station for the Westar fleet, providing TT&C (telemetry, tracking & control) & uplink services. (now the primary uplink site for the SiriusXM satellite radio service)
