= Eutelsat 31A =

Communications satellite

- Names: e-Bird (2003–2006); Eurobird 3 (2006–2012); Eutelsat 33A (2012–2014); Eutelsat 31A (2014–present)
- Mission type: Communications
- Operator: Eutelsat
- COSPAR ID: 2003-043A
- SATCAT no.: 27948
- Mission duration: 10 years (achieved); 21 years, 10 months, 29 days (in orbit)

Spacecraft properties
- Bus: BSS-376
- Manufacturer: Boeing
- Launch mass: 1,530 kilograms (3,370 lb)
- Dry mass: 888 kilograms (1,958 lb)
- Power: watts

Start of mission
- Launch date: 27 September 2003, 23:14:46 UTC
- Rocket: Ariane 5G
- Launch site: Kourou ELA-3
- Contractor: Arianespace

Orbital parameters
- Reference system: Geocentric
- Regime: Geostationary
- Longitude: 31° East

Transponders
- Band: 20 Ku-band
- Coverage area: Continental Europe; Great Britain; Scandinavia; Turkey

Eutelsat 31A, formerly e-Bird, Eurobird 3 and Eutelsat 33A, is a communications satellite that offers capacity for broadband and broadcast services in Europe. Owned by Eutelsat, it was launched on 27 September 2003 at 23:14:46 UTC.

Positioned at 31° East - having been relocated from 33° East in May 2014 - Eutelsat 31A is optimised for interactive broadband services, and also valued by broadcasters for occasional use and professional video services, and data networks like Estar by Technologie Satelitarne service.

Its 20 K_{u} band transponders are connected to four spot beams over Europe and Turkey. These four beams overlap to allow hubs located in the hot spots of each beam to communicate with each other, thus ensuring highly effective pan-European coverage.
