= STTW =

The initialism STTW may stand for:

- Sabrina the Teenage Witch, a comic book series
- "Shiyong Tongbu Tongxing Weixing", a family of Chinese communications satellites known operationally as the Dong Fang Hong 2
- "Shiyan Tongbu Tongxing Weixing", two proof of technology satellites launched as part of the Dong Fang Hong program
