= STS-7 =

1983 American crewed spaceflight

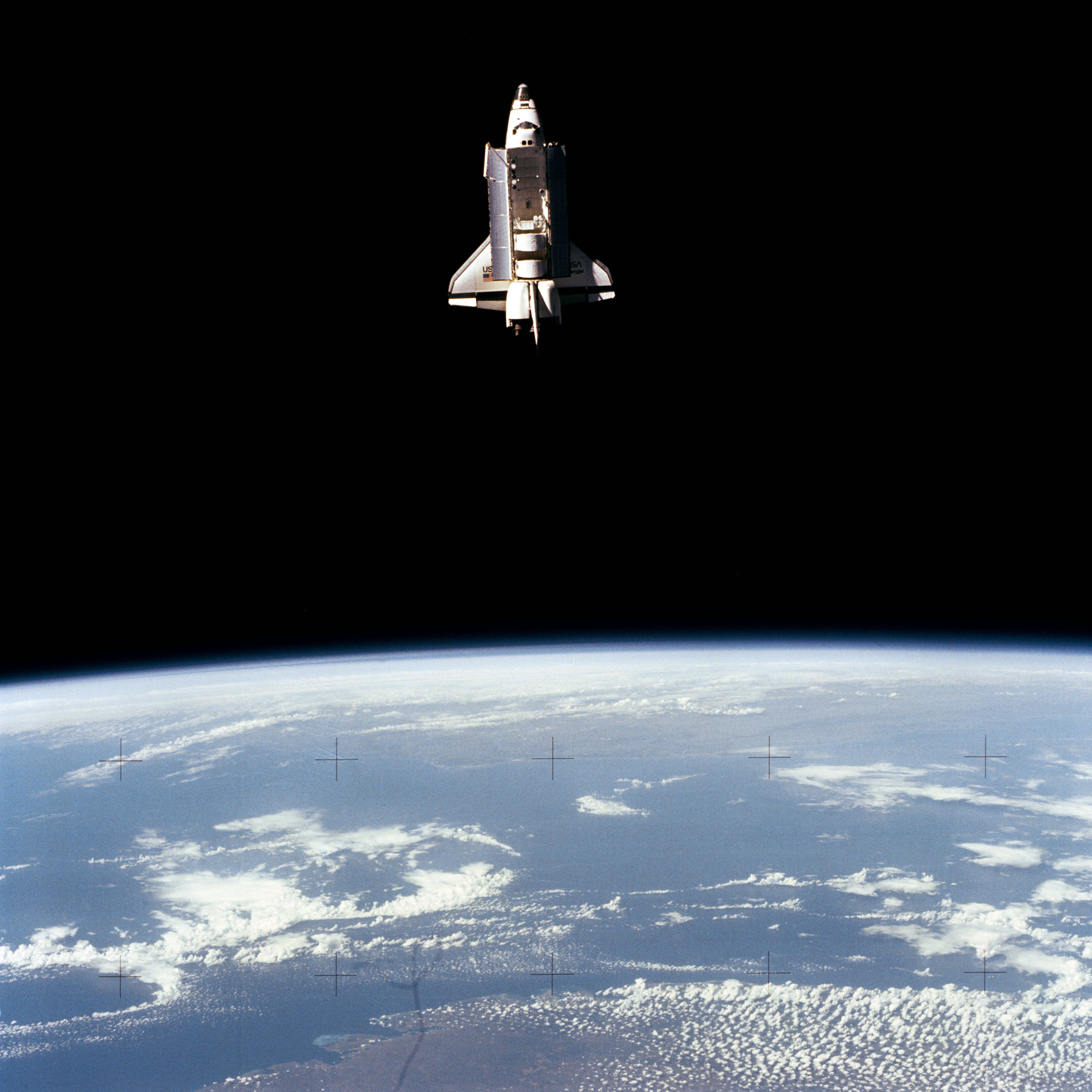
- Challenger as photographed by the SPAS-1 satellite on June 22, 1983
- Names: Space Transportation System-7
- Mission type: Communications satellites deployment; Microgravity research
- Operator: NASA
- COSPAR ID: 1983-059A
- SATCAT no.: 14132
- Mission duration: 6 days, 2 hours, 23 minutes, 59 seconds
- Distance travelled: 3,570,000 km (2,220,000 mi)
- Orbits completed: 97

Spacecraft properties
- Spacecraft: Space Shuttle Challenger
- Launch mass: 113,025 kg (249,177 lb)
- Landing mass: 92,550 kg (204,040 lb)
- Payload mass: 16,839 kg (37,124 lb)

Crew
- Crew size: 5
- Members: Robert Crippen; Frederick Hauck; John M. Fabian; Sally Ride; Norman Thagard

Start of mission
- Launch date: June 18, 1983, 11:33:00 UTC (7:33 am EDT)
- Launch site: Kennedy, LC-39A
- Contractor: Rockwell International

End of mission
- Landing date: June 24, 1983, 13:56:59 UTC (6:56:59 am PDT)
- Landing site: Edwards, Runway 15

Orbital parameters
- Reference system: Geocentric orbit
- Regime: Low Earth orbit
- Perigee altitude: 299 km (186 mi)
- Apogee altitude: 307 km (191 mi)
- Inclination: 28.30°
- Period: 90.60 minutes

Instruments
- Getaway Special (GAS) canisters
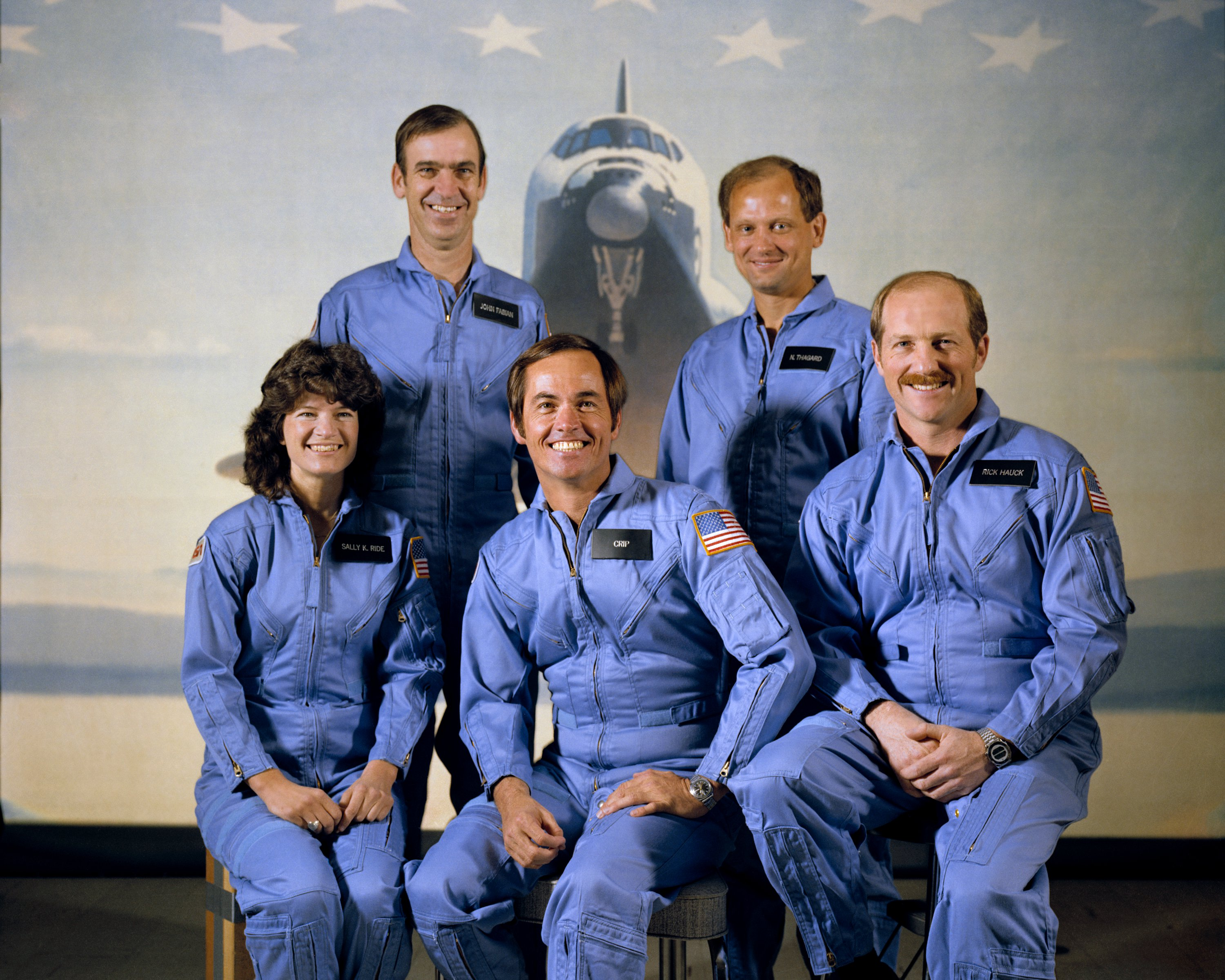
- STS-7 mission patch From left: Ride, Fabian, Crippen, Thagard and Hauck Space Shuttle program

STS-7 was NASA's seventh Space Shuttle mission, and the second mission for the Space Shuttle Challenger. During the mission, Challenger deployed several satellites into orbit. The shuttle launched from Kennedy Space Center on June 18, 1983, and landed at Edwards Air Force Base on June 24, 1983. STS-7 carried Sally Ride, America's first female astronaut and the first astronaut in space known to have been LGBTQ.

== Crew ==
Position	Astronaut
Commander	Robert Crippen; Second spaceflight
Pilot	Frederick Hauck; First spaceflight
Mission Specialist 1	John M. Fabian; First spaceflight
Mission Specialist 2 Flight Engineer	Sally Ride; First spaceflight
Mission Specialist 3	Norman Thagard; First spaceflight

=== Support crew ===
- John E. Blaha
- Roy D. Bridges Jr. (ascent CAPCOM)
- Guy Gardner
- Terry Hart
- Jon McBride
- Bryan D. O'Connor (entry CAPCOM)

=== Crew seat assignments ===
Seat	Launch	Landing	Seats 1–4 are on the flight deck. Seats 5–7 are on the mid-deck.
1	Crippen		Seats 1–4 are on the flight deck. Seats 5–7 are on the mid-deck.
2	Hauck		Seats 1–4 are on the flight deck. Seats 5–7 are on the mid-deck.
3	Fabian	Thagard	Seats 1–4 are on the flight deck. Seats 5–7 are on the mid-deck.
4	Ride		Seats 1–4 are on the flight deck. Seats 5–7 are on the mid-deck.
5	Thagard	Fabian	Seats 1–4 are on the flight deck. Seats 5–7 are on the mid-deck.
6	Unused		Seats 1–4 are on the flight deck. Seats 5–7 are on the mid-deck.
7	Unused		Seats 1–4 are on the flight deck. Seats 5–7 are on the mid-deck.

== Mission summary ==
STS-7 began on June 18, 1983, with an on-time liftoff at 7:33:00 a.m. EDT. It was the first spaceflight of an American woman (Ride), the largest crew to fly in a single spacecraft up to that time (five people), and the first flight that included members of NASA's Group 8 astronaut class, which had been selected in 1978 to fly the Space Shuttle. President Ronald Reagan also sent his personal favorite Jelly Belly jelly beans with the astronauts, making them the first jelly beans in space. The crew had already eaten lunch with the president at the White House on June 1, the first time that a crew did so before launch rather than after.

The crew of STS-7 included Robert Crippen, commander, making his second Shuttle flight; Frederick Hauck, pilot; and Sally Ride, John M. Fabian and Norman Thagard, all mission specialists. Thagard conducted medical tests concerning Space adaptation syndrome, a bout of nausea frequently experienced by astronauts during the early phase of a space flight.

Two communications satellites – Anik C2 for Telesat of Canada, and Palapa B1 for Indonesia – were successfully deployed during the first two days of the mission; both were Hughes-built HS-376-series satellites. The mission also carried the first Shuttle pallet satellite (SPAS-1), which was built by the West German aerospace firm Messerschmitt-Bölkow-Blohm (MBB). SPAS-1 was unique in that it was designed to operate in the payload bay or be deployed by the Remote Manipulator System (Canadarm) as a free-flying satellite. It carried 10 experiments to study formation of metal alloys in microgravity, the operation of heat pipes, instruments for remote sensing observations, and a mass spectrometer to identify various gases in the payload bay. It was deployed by the Canadarm and flew alongside and over Challenger for several hours, performing various maneuvers, while a U.S.-supplied camera mounted on SPAS-1 took pictures of the orbiter. The Canadarm later grappled the pallet and returned it to the payload bay.

STS-7 also carried seven Getaway Special (GAS) canisters, which contained a wide variety of experiments, as well as the OSTA-2 payload, a joint U.S.-West Germany scientific pallet payload. Finally, the orbiter's Ku-band antenna was able to relay data through the U.S. tracking and data relay satellite (TDRS) to a ground terminal for the first time.

STS-7 was scheduled to make the first orbiter landing at Kennedy Space Center's then-new Shuttle Landing Facility (SLF). Unacceptable weather forced a change to Runway 15 at Edwards Air Force Base. The landing took place on June 24, 1983, at 06:56:59 a.m. PDT. Aside from the third of the Approach and Landing Tests conducted by Enterprise in 1977, this was the only time a space shuttle landed on Runway 15. The mission lasted 6 days, 2 hours, 23 minutes, and 59 seconds, and covered about 3,570,000 km (2,220,000 mi) during 97 orbits of the Earth. Challenger was returned to KSC on June 29, 1983.

== Incidents ==
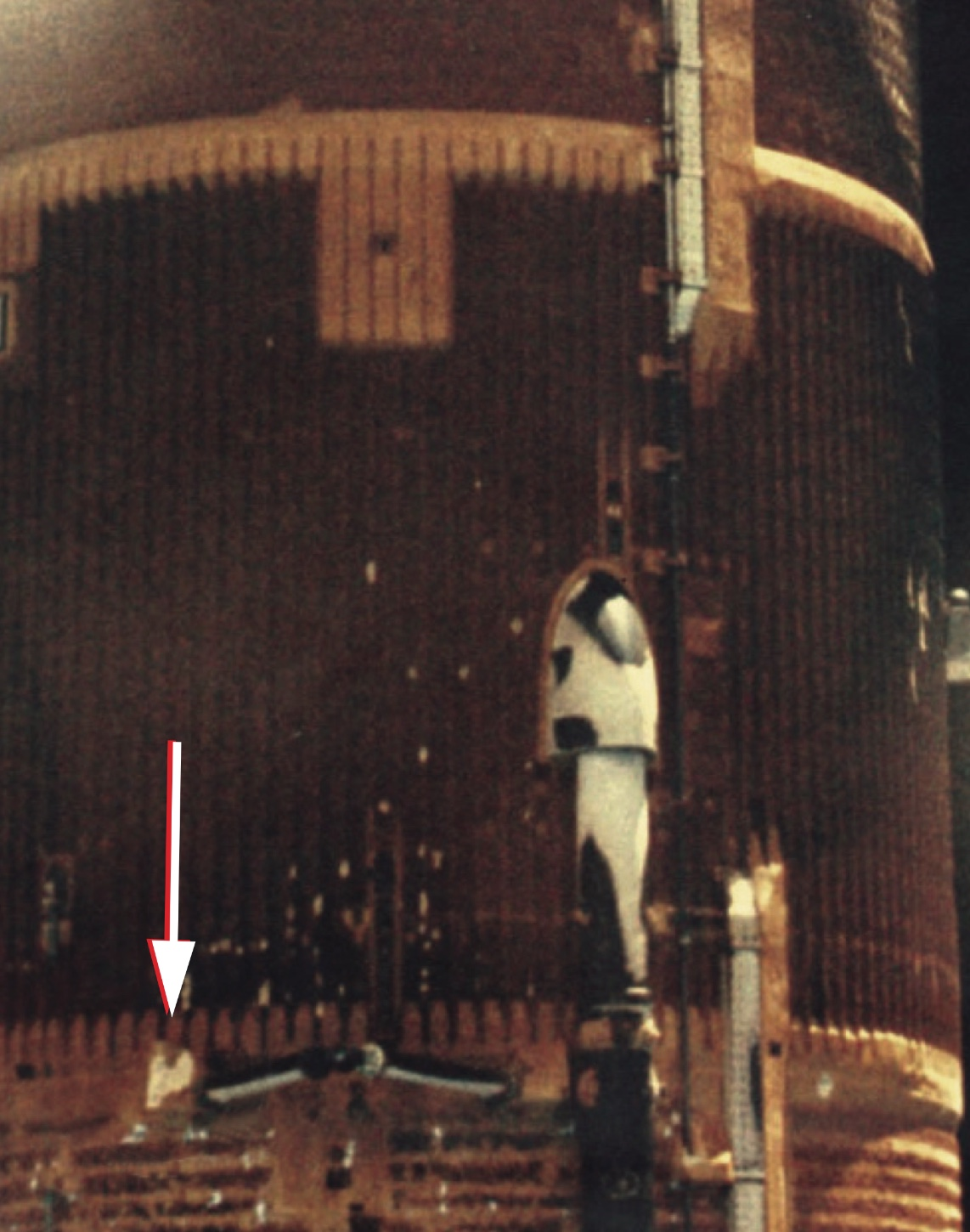
External Tank serial number 6 after jettison from Challenger on June 18, 1983. The arrow indicates the white area on the left bipod ramp where foam had broken off.

STS-7 experienced the first known Space Shuttle external tank (ET) bipod ramp foam shedding event during launch. This was the root cause of the eventual loss of Columbia during STS-107 almost two decades later. While Challenger was on-orbit, one of its windows was damaged non-critically by space debris.

Sally Ride was presented approximately 100 tampons by NASA workers before launch, should she experience menstruation during the 6-day orbit (despite the typical amount of tampons used by women being 3-6 per day, depending on flow rate).

== Mission insignia ==
The seven white stars in the black field of the mission patch, as well as the arm extending from the orbiter in the shape of a 7, indicate the flight's numerical designation in the Space Transportation System's mission sequence. The five-armed symbol on the right side illustrates the four male/one female crew.

== Wake-up calls ==
NASA began a tradition of playing music to astronauts during the Project Gemini, and first used music to wake up a flight crew during Apollo 15. Each track is specially chosen, often by the astronauts' families, and usually has a special meaning to an individual member of the crew, or is applicable to their daily activities.

Flight Day	Song	Artist/Composer	Played for
Day 2	"Aggie War Hymn"/"University of Texas Fight Song"	Fightin' Texas Aggie Band/University of Texas band	Bob Crippen (Note: Crippen was a graduate of the University of Texas; the song of their rivals, Texas A&M, was played as a joke.)
Day 3	"Aggie War Hymn"/"Tufts Tonia's Day"	Fightin' Texas Aggie Band/The Tufts University Beelzebubs	Rick Hauck
Day 4	Medley: "Aggie War Hymn"/"Reveille"/"When You're Smiling"	Fightin' Texas Aggie Band/Unknown/Dr. Howard E. Cleave	Mary L. Cleave (Note: Cleave was the CAPCOM for STS-7. "When You're Smiling" was sung by her father.)
Day 5	"Washington State University Cougar Fight Song"	Washington State University Band	John Fabian
Day 6	"Stanford Hymn"	Leland Stanford Junior University Marching Band	Sally Ride
Day 7	"Florida State University Fight Song"	Florida State University Marching Chiefs	Norm Thagard

== Gallery ==
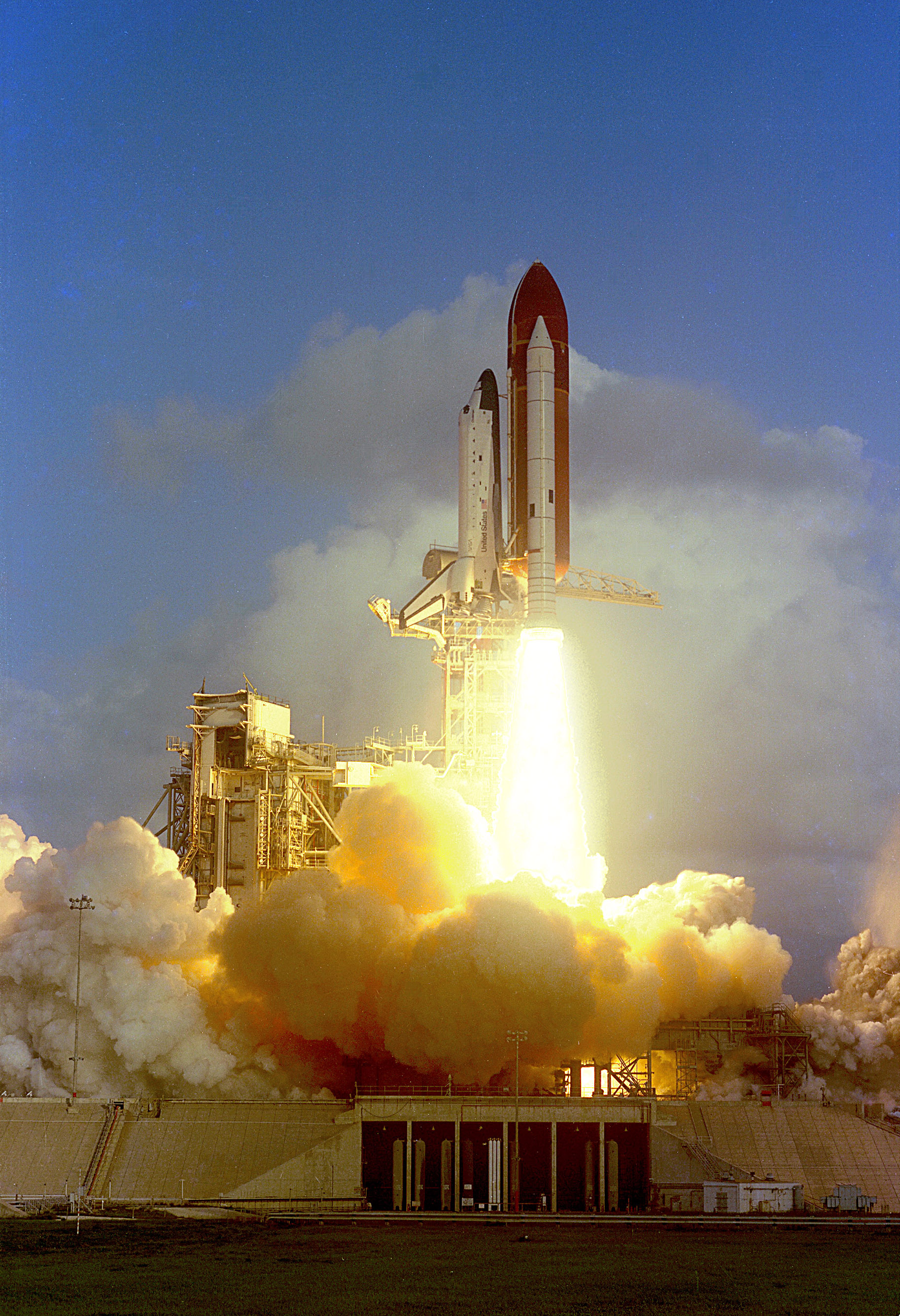
The second launch of Challenger

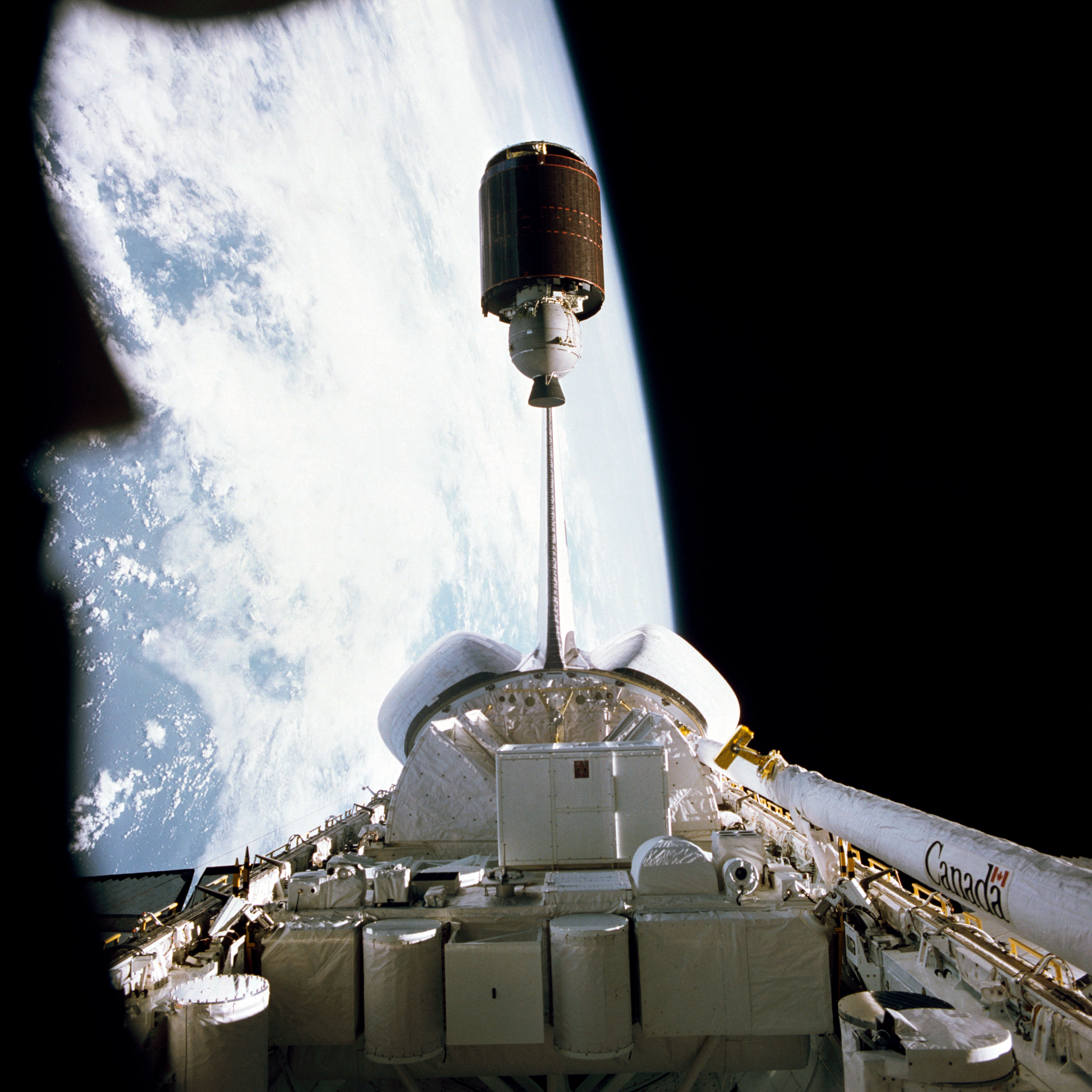
Deployment of Palapa B1

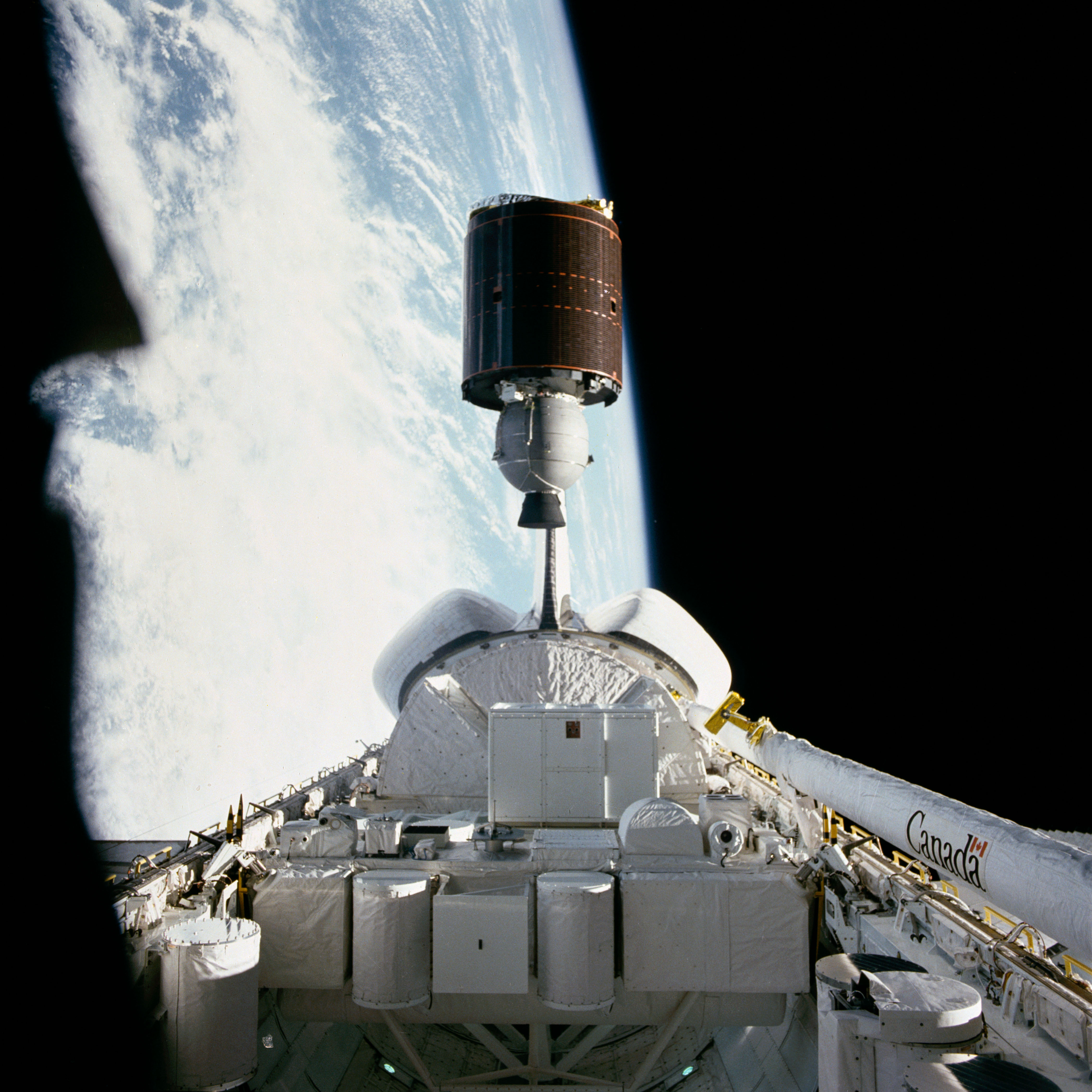
Deployment of Anik C2

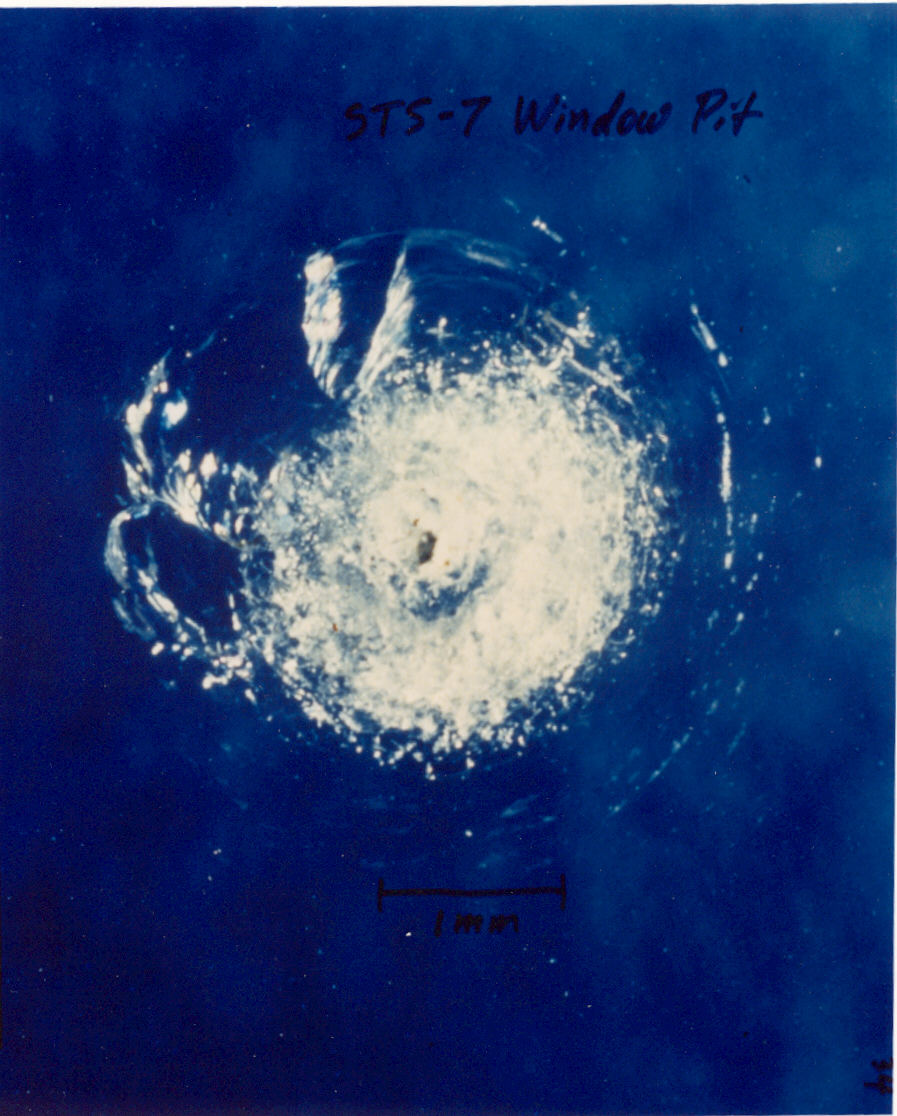
Window pit caused by impact of space debris

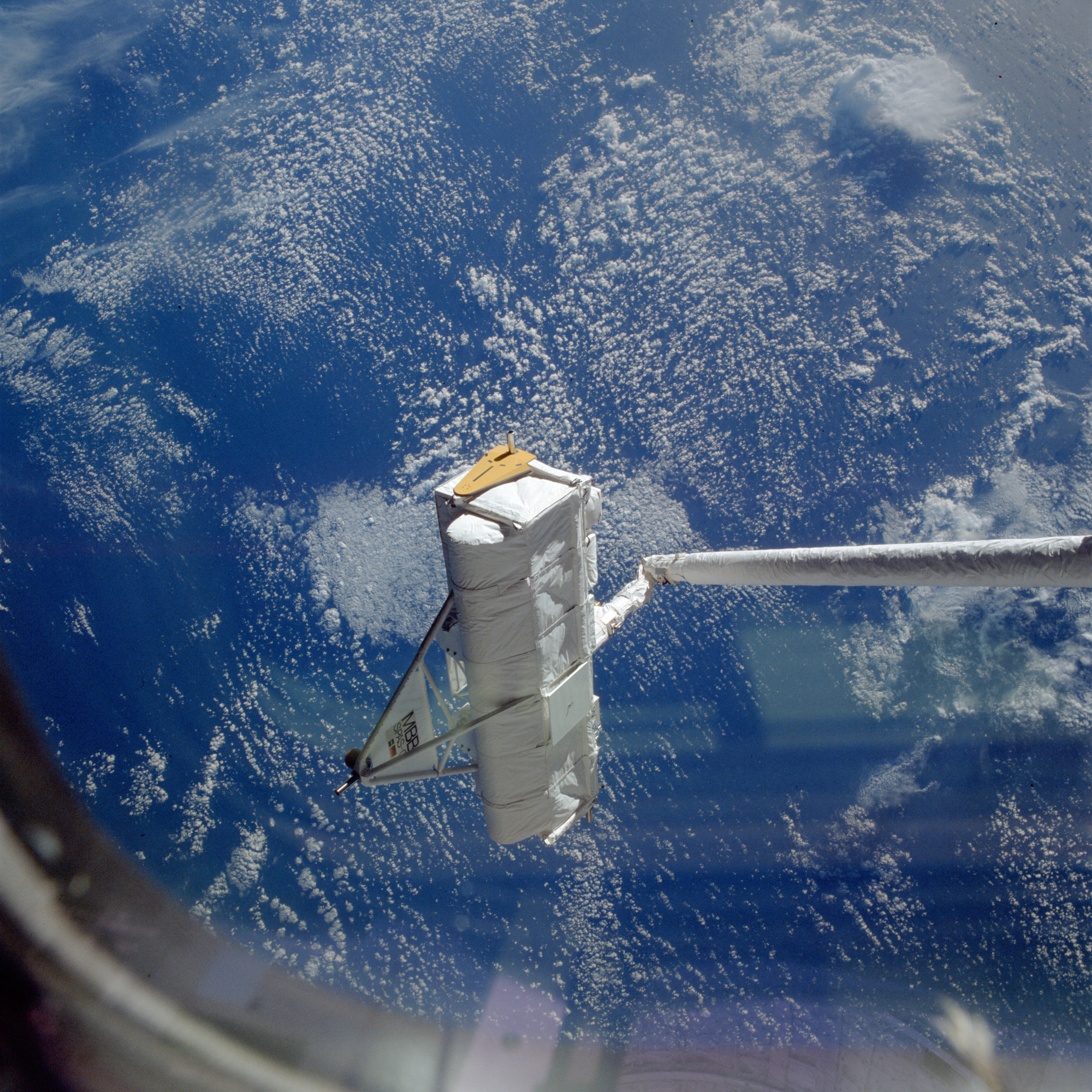
SPAS-1 grappled by the Canadarm

== See also ==
- List of human spaceflights
- List of Space Shuttle missions
