= HS-333 =

Hughes Aircraft Company satellite bus

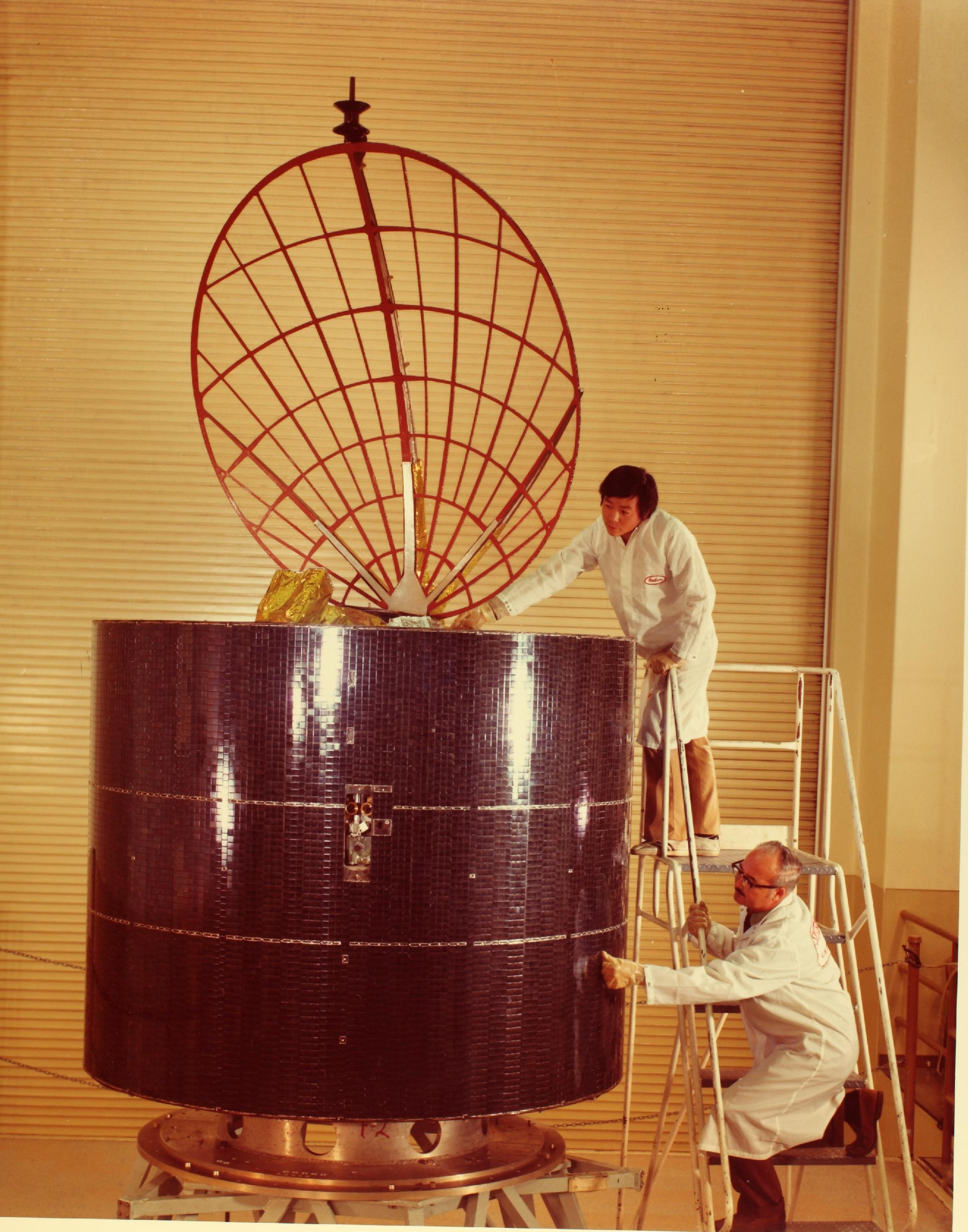
- Manufacturer: Hughes Aircraft Company

Specifications
- Spacecraft type: Satellite
- Launch mass: 560–574 kg (1,235–1,265 lb)
- Dry mass: 146 kg (322 lb)
- Payload capacity: 54 kg (119 lb)
- Power: 300 watts
- Design life: 7 years

Dimensions
- Length: 3.3 m (11 ft)
- Diameter: 1.8 m (5.9 ft)

Production
- Status: Retired
- Launched: 8
- Operational: 0
- Retired: 8
- Maiden launch: 10 November 1972
- Last launch: 20 August 1979

In 1970, Hughes Aircraft Company (HAC) Space and Communications Group offered the first standardized satellite: the HS 333 design. A spinning satellite, it was based on previous one-design satellites like Intelsat I. HAC built eight of these 300 watt, 12 channel single antenna satellites between 1970 and 1977.

== Design ==
The early satellites were designed with cylindrical bodies to maximize the size of the satellite that could fit inside of the rocket's nose cone or fairing which was also round. The early design satellites also relied on spinning at about 30 rpm for stability in orbit. The spinning satellite is a gyroscope.

Several parallel decks, including the top and bottom, were used to mount the propulsion, attitude control, communication, Telemetry & Command (T&C), and power equipment. The upper deck or top of the satellite contained the payload antenna and the T&C antenna.

The outer surface of the cylindrical body was covered with solar cells to generate power for operating the satellite's electrical equipment. Batteries provide power during an eclipse when the satellite is in the shadow of the Earth. The batteries are recharged by excess power from the solar array.

The HS 333 was 1.8 m (6 ft) in diameter and nominally 3.3 m (11 ft) high. The solar array and batteries provided sufficient power over the satellite's 7-year design life to power the 190 W payload and 233 W spacecraft equipment. The payload contributed 54 kg (119 lb) of the HS 333's 146 kg (542 lb) dry mass.

== Satellites ==
Eight HS-333 satellites were launched from 1972 to 1979:

Satellite	Operator	Launch date (UTC)	Carrier rocket	Mass	Longitude	Retirement	Remarks
Anik A1	Telesat Canada	10 November 1972; 01:14:03	Delta 1914	560 kg (1,230 lb)	104°W; 114°W	15 July 1982	
Anik A2	Telesat Canada	20 April 1973; 23:47:03	Delta 1914	560 kg (1,230 lb)	109°W	6 October 1982	
Westar 1	(United States) Western Union	13 April 1974; 23:33:03	Delta 2914	574 kg (1,265 lb)	99°W	April 1983	
Westar 2	(United States) Western Union	10 October 1974; 23:53:00	Delta 2914	574 kg (1,265 lb)	125°W		
Anik A3	Telesat Canada	7 May 1975; 23:35:26	Delta 2914	560 kg (1,230 lb)	104°W; 115°W	21 November 1984	
Palapa A1	(Indonesia) Perumtel	8 July 1976; 23:31	Delta 2914	574 kg (1,265 lb)	83°E	1985	
Palapa A2	(Indonesia) Perumtel	10 March 1977; 23:16	Delta 2914	574 kg (1,265 lb)	77°E	1988	
Westar 3	(United States) Western Union	20 August 1979; 00:20	Delta 2914	574 kg (1,265 lb)	91°W		

== See also ==
- Comparison of satellite buses
