= Technologie Satelitarne =

Technologie Satelitarne is a satellite Internet service provider from Poland. The project offered by Technologie Satelitarne is broadband Internet access in areas with poor telecommunications infrastructure. They offer two-way K_{u} band broadband satellite Internet access for private use, companies and institutions available in Europe, Western Asia, the Middle East and the whole Africa. The service includes 24 hour network monitoring in satellite company centres. Guaranteed uptime is 99.5% a year.

Technologie Satelitarne is one of the biggest Internet service provider for US Army soldiers in Iraq and Afghanistan.
