= Thaicom 1 =

Thai communications satellite (1993)

- Mission type: Communications
- Operator: Thaicom

Spacecraft properties
- Manufacturer: Hughes Space and Communications

Start of mission
- Launch date: 18 December 1993
- Rocket: Ariane 4 (44L)
- Launch site: Guiana Space Centre, ELA-2

Orbital parameters
- Reference system: Geocentric orbit
- Regime: Geostationary orbit

Thaicom 1, later renamed to Thaicom 1A, was Thailand's first geostationary communications satellite, launched on 18 December 1993 aboard an Ariane 4 rocket from the Guiana Space Centre in French Guiana.

The satellite formed part of Thailand's first domestic satellite communications programme under a concession granted to Shinawatra Satellite in the early 1990s.

== Background ==
Thaicom 1 was procured from Hughes Space and Communications and built on the HS-376 satellite platform, a spin-stabilised commercial communications satellite bus widely used in the 1980s and 1990s.

Independent reporting and aerospace analysis describe the launch of Thaicom 1 as marking Thailand's entry into the commercial satellite communications sector and establishing the foundation for subsequent national satellite programmes.

== Launch ==
Thaicom 1 was launched on 18 December 1993 by Arianespace on an Ariane 44L mission from ELA-2 at Kourou.

== Mission ==
Aerospace documentation notes that the satellite operated in geostationary orbit and was part of Thailand's expanding national communications infrastructure during the 1990s.
