= Dong Fang Hong 2 =

Dong Fang Hong 2 (also romanised as Dongfanghong 2) was the primary television satellite used by China during the later part of the 20th century. It was developed at the Chinese Academy of Space Technology (CAST) and had a design life 4.5 years. The first operational satellite in this group was launched into a geosynchronous orbit on 8 April 1984.

Three satellites orbited in geosynchronous orbits at 87.5°, 110.5°, and 98.0° east. A fourth satellite failed to achieve a stable orbit due to a problem with the third stage.

== Background ==
Operating under the name Dong Fang Hong 2, the Shiyong Tongbu Tongxing Weixing (STTW, Chinese: 實用定位通訊衛星, literally Operational Geostationary Communications Satellite) was the designation of a family of indigenous Chinese communications satellites developed under the Project 331 initiative of the late 1970s and early 1980s. Being able to provide both civilian and military long distance telephony, in addition to satellite television, the initiative was promoted by the senior Chinese leadership, most notably Deng Xiaoping and Zhou Enlai, as a means to improve the communications infrastructure of the country, especially in mountainous and hard to reach areas. Building on work that had been ongoing since the 1960s Mao gave his assent to the project in April 1975. The launch vehicle for the satellites was the Long March 3 with which it was developed in parallel and conjunction as part of Project 331. In order to achieve a geostationary orbit, in addition to the normal three stages of the Long March 3, the STTW required a small solid propellant apogee kick motor.

As part of the development program two proof of technology demonstrators were launched (Shiyan Tongbu Tongxing Weixing, "Test Geostationary Communications Satellite"). The first of these launches in January 1984 was a failure when the second burn of the hydrogen fuelled cryogenic third stage engine, intended to boost the satellite from low Earth orbit (LEO) into a geostationary transfer orbit (GTO), failed. However, despite being stranded in low Earth orbit, available telemetry indicated that the satellite itself was sound. The launch of the second test satellite was brought forward in April 1984, and this time both launch vehicle and satellite functioned as intended. Providing 200 telephone lines, and fifteen radio and television channels, the Shiyan Weixing demonstrated the utility of a communications satellite to link the developed coastal regions of Eastern China with the inhospitable and inaccessible regions of Western China.

Functioning until 1988, when it was parked in a graveyard orbit, Shiyan Weixing paved the way for the operational Shiyong Weixings, which remained China's primary communications satellite until replaced by the Dong Fang Hong 3.

== Satellites ==
Satellite	Construction	Date of launch	Launch vehicle	Status	Notes
STTW-T1		29 January 1984	Long March 3	Inactive	Also known as DFH-2 1. Proof of technology test satellite. Failed to achieve geosynchronous orbit, however the satellite was tested as far as possible and was found to be functioning, and because of this the launch was considered to be only a partial failure or partial success.
STTW-T2		8 April 1984	Long March 3	Inactive	Also known as DFH-2 2. Proof of technology test satellite.
STTW-T3		1 February 1986	Long March 3	Inactive	Also known as DFH-2 3. Proof of technology test satellite.
STTW-1		7 March 1988	Long March 3	Inactive	Also known as DFH-2A 1, ZX-1 and ChinaSat 1.
STTW-2		22 December 1988	Long March 3	Inactive	Also known as DFH-2A 2, ZX-2 and ChinaSat 2.
STTW 3		4 February 1990	Long March 3	Inactive	Also known as DFH-2A 3, ZX-3 and ChinaSat 3.
STTW-4		28 December 1991	Long March 3	Failure	Also known as DFH-2A 4, ZX-4 and ChinaSat 4.

== Satellite design ==
The satellite was cylindrical with a height of 8.5 m (28 ft), a diameter of 2.1 m (6 ft 11 in) and weighed 441 kg (972 lb).

The Dongfanghong 2A satellite used a parabolic communications antenna mounted to the top of the satellite for broadcast purposes. The antenna could be rotated to keep it aligned with the Earth. Twenty-thousand solar cells were mounted to the satellite to provide power. This was China's first successful use of photovoltaic technology.

== See also ==
- Dong Fang Hong I
- Ren Xinmin, Chief Engineer of Project 331, a family of five programs to develop a communications satellite and launch vehicle and the technologies to enable and exploit their use
