= STS-51-A =

1984 American crewed spaceflight to deploy and retrieve communications satellites

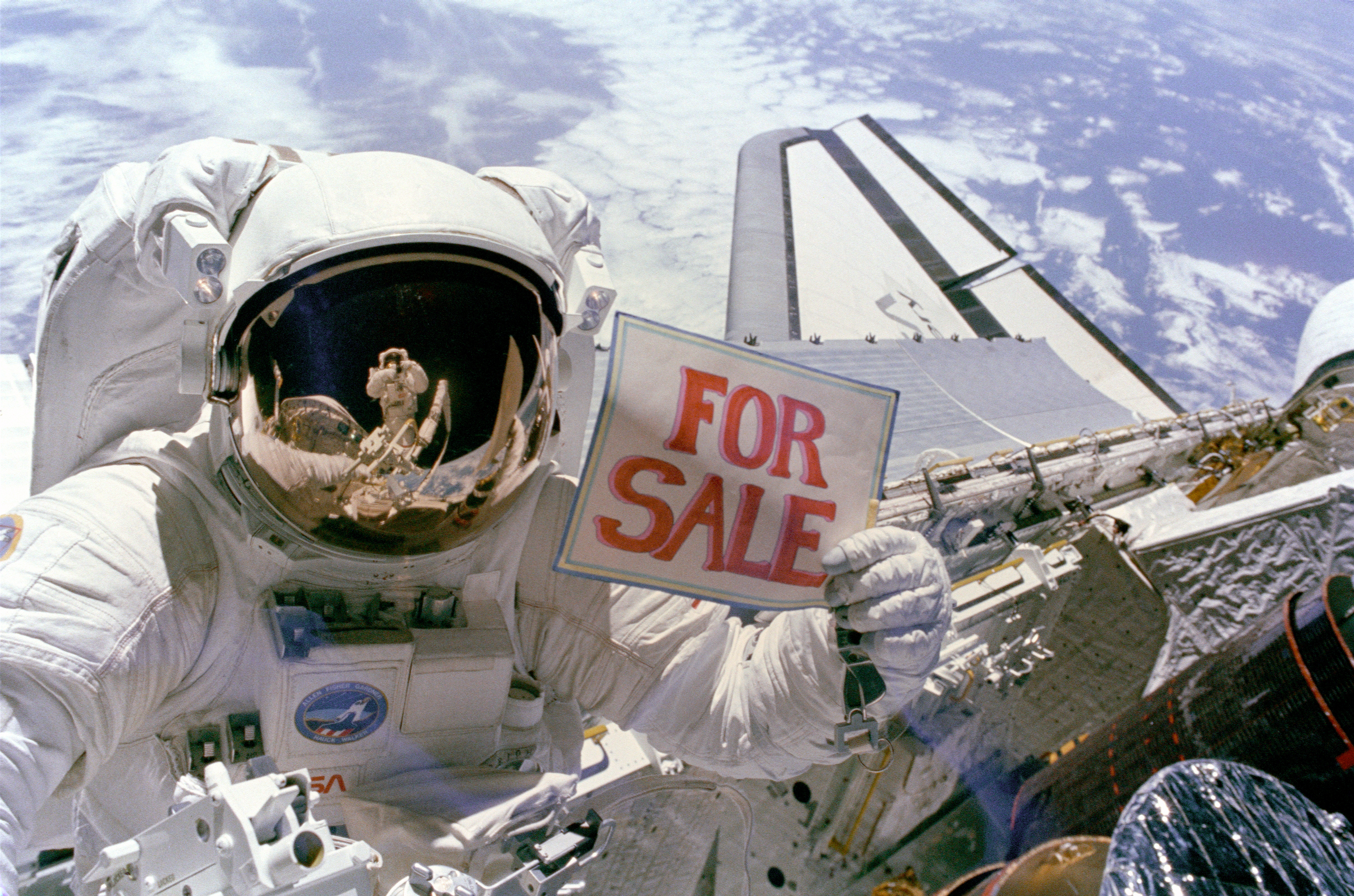
- Dale A. Gardner poses in front of a camera with a "For Sale" sign in his hand, jokingly referring to the two broken satellites (Palapa B2 and Westar 6) the crew was sent out on EVA to pick up and return to Earth.
- Names: Space Transportation System-14
- Mission type: Communications satellites deployment Communications satellites retrieval
- Operator: NASA
- COSPAR ID: 1984-113A
- SATCAT no.: 15382
- Mission duration: 7 days, 23 hours, 44 minutes, 56 seconds
- Distance travelled: 5,293,786 km (3,289,406 mi)
- Orbits completed: 127

Spacecraft properties
- Spacecraft: Space Shuttle Discovery
- Launch mass: 119,442 kg (263,325 lb)
- Landing mass: 94,123 kg (207,506 lb)
- Payload mass: 17,375 kg (38,305 lb)

Crew
- Crew size: 5
- Members: Frederick H. Hauck; David M. Walker; Joseph P. Allen; Anna Lee Fisher; Dale A. Gardner
- EVAs: 2
- EVA duration: 11 hours, 42 minutes; 1st EVA: 6 hours; 2nd EVA: 5 hours, 42 minutes

Start of mission
- Launch date: November 8, 1984, 12:15:00 UTC (7:15 am EST)
- Launch site: Kennedy, LC-39A
- Contractor: Rockwell International

End of mission
- Landing date: November 16, 1984, 11:59:56 UTC (6:59:56 am EST)
- Landing site: Kennedy, SLF Runway 15

Orbital parameters
- Reference system: Geocentric orbit
- Regime: Low Earth orbit
- Perigee altitude: 332 km (206 mi)
- Apogee altitude: 354 km (220 mi)
- Inclination: 28.45°
- Period: 90.40 minutes

Instruments
- Diffused Mixing of Organic Solutions (DMOS)
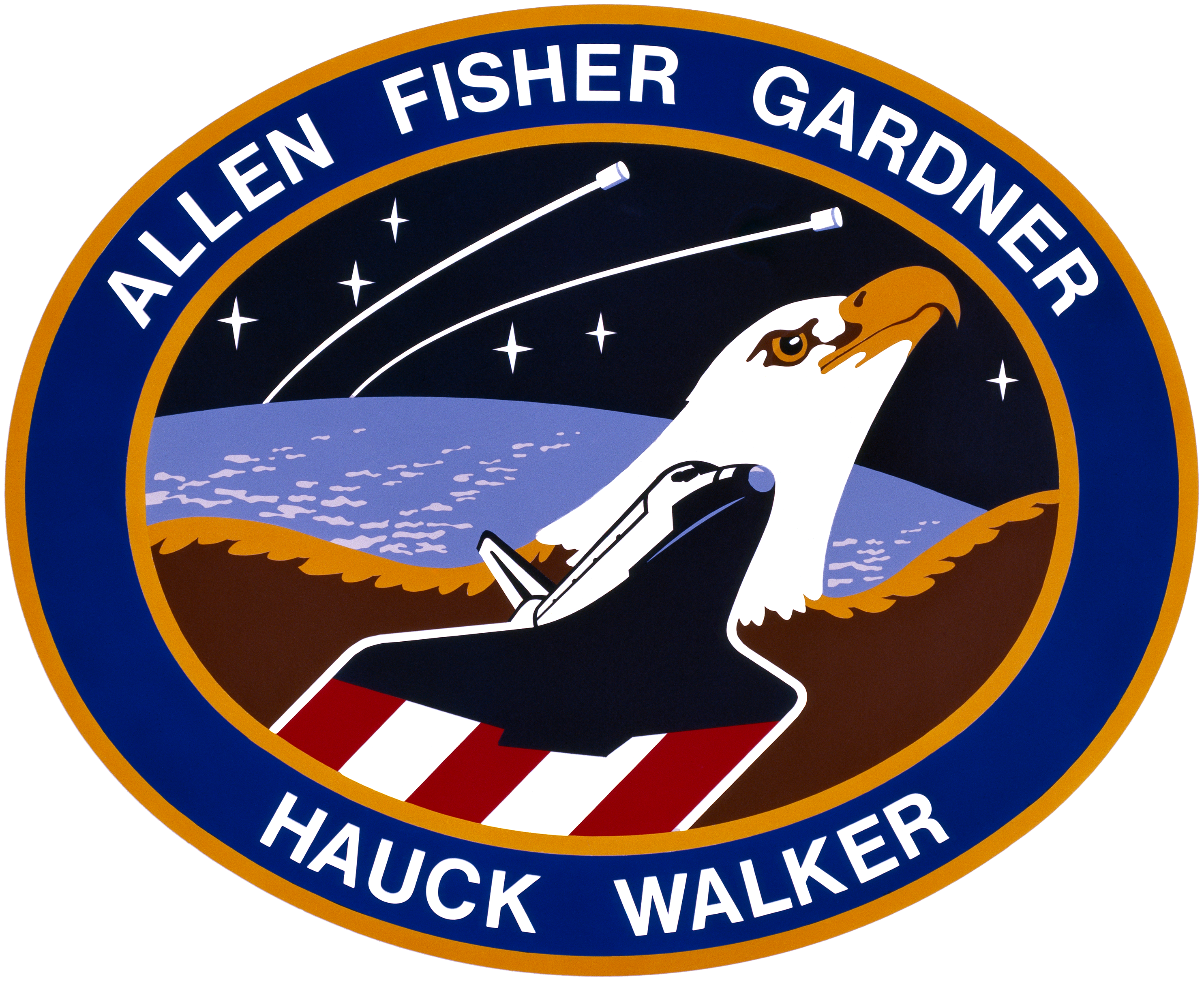
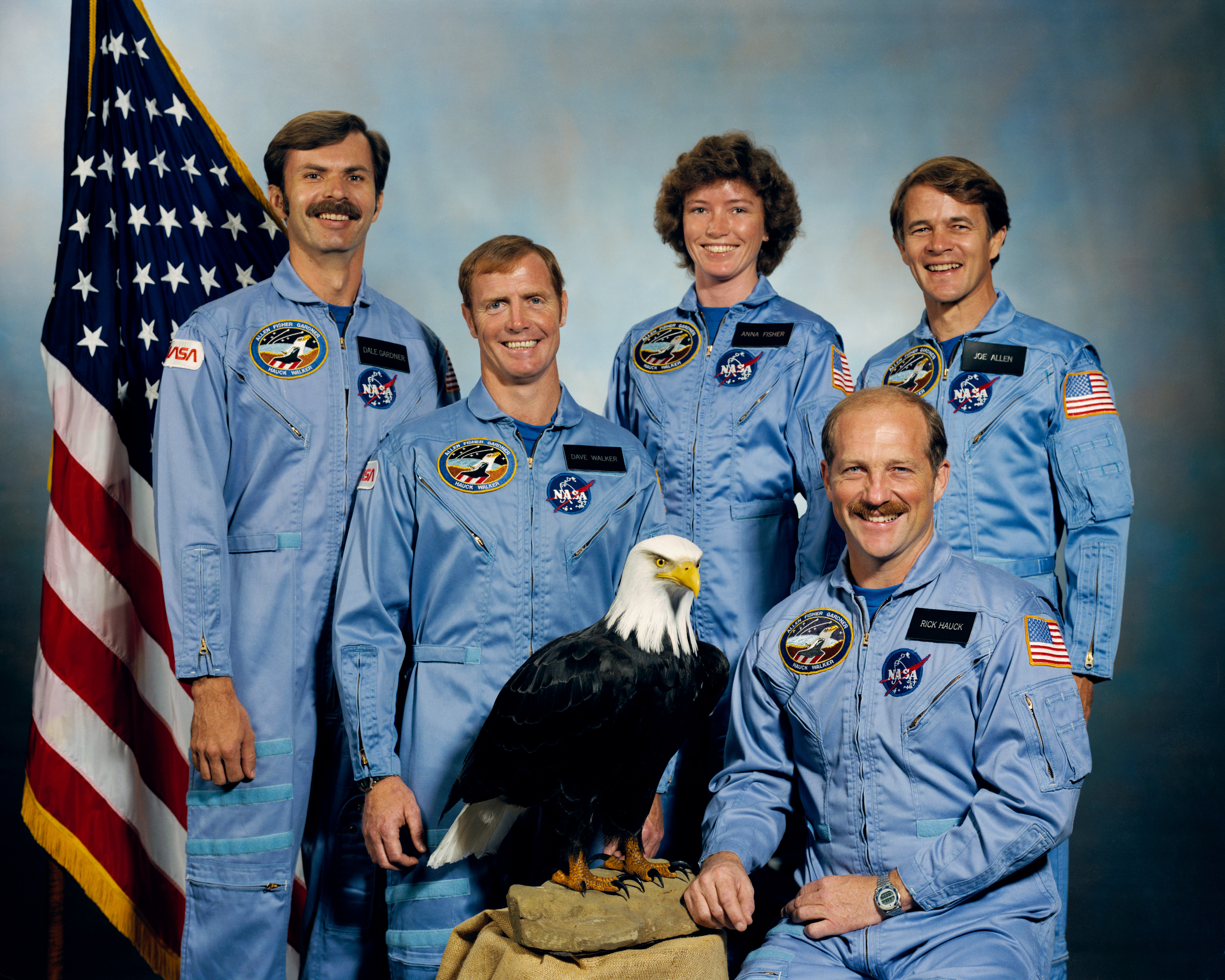
- STS-51-A mission patch From left: Gardner, Walker, Fisher, Hauck and Allen Space Shuttle program

STS-51-A (formerly STS-19) was the 14th flight of NASA's Space Shuttle program, and the second flight of Space Shuttle Discovery. The mission launched from Kennedy Space Center on November 8, 1984, and landed just under eight days later on November 16, 1984.

STS-51-A marked the first time a shuttle deployed two communications satellites, and retrieved from orbit two other communications satellites. The Canadian Anik D2 and Syncom IV-1 satellites were both successfully deployed by the crew of Discovery. Palapa B2 and Westar 6, meanwhile, had been deployed during the STS-41-B mission earlier in the year, but had been placed into improper orbits due to the malfunctioning of their kick motors; they were both safely recovered and returned to Earth during STS-51-A.

== Crew ==
Position	Astronaut
Commander	Frederick H. Hauck; Second spaceflight
Pilot	David M. Walker; First spaceflight
Mission Specialist 1	Joseph P. Allen; Second and last spaceflight
Mission Specialist 2 Flight Engineer	Anna L. Fisher; Only spaceflight
Mission Specialist 3	Dale A. Gardner; Second and last spaceflight

=== Spacewalks ===
EVA 1

- Personnel: Allen and Gardner
- Date: November 12, 1984 (13:25–19:25 UTC)
- Duration: 6 hours

EVA 2

- Personnel: Allen and Gardner
- Date: November 14, 1984 (11:09–16:51 UTC)
- Duration: 5 hours, 42 minutes

=== Crew seat assignments ===
Seat	Launch	Landing	Seats 1–4 are on the flight deck. Seats 5–7 are on the mid-deck.
1	Hauck		Seats 1–4 are on the flight deck. Seats 5–7 are on the mid-deck.
2	Walker		Seats 1–4 are on the flight deck. Seats 5–7 are on the mid-deck.
3	Allen	Gardner	Seats 1–4 are on the flight deck. Seats 5–7 are on the mid-deck.
4	Fisher		Seats 1–4 are on the flight deck. Seats 5–7 are on the mid-deck.
5	Gardner	Allen	Seats 1–4 are on the flight deck. Seats 5–7 are on the mid-deck.
6	Unused		Seats 1–4 are on the flight deck. Seats 5–7 are on the mid-deck.
7	Unused		Seats 1–4 are on the flight deck. Seats 5–7 are on the mid-deck.

== Mission summary ==
Attempt	Planned	Result	Turnaround	Reason	Decision point	Weather go (%)	Notes
1	7 Nov 1984, 8:23:00 am	Scrubbed	—	Weather	7 Nov 1984, 7:51 am (T−00:20:00 hold)		High windshear in the KSC area.
2	8 Nov 1984, 7:15:00 am	Success	0 days 22 hours 52 minutes				

STS-51-A was launched from Florida's Kennedy Space Center (KSC) at 7:15:00 a.m. EST, on November 8, 1984, less than a month after the STS-41-G flight. A launch attempt the day before was scrubbed at T-minus 20 minutes due to high shear winds in the upper atmosphere.

The five-person flight crew consisted of Frederick H. Hauck, commander, on his second flight; pilot David M. Walker; and three mission specialists – Anna Lee Fisher, Dale A. Gardner and Joseph P. Allen. Both Gardner and Allen were making their second shuttle flights. STS-51-A marked the first flight of the Space Shuttle commanded by an astronaut from the 1978 class rather than the Apollo era.

The two communications satellites successfully deployed were Anik D2 (on the second day of the mission) and Syncom IV-1, also known as Leasat 1 (on the third day); both were Hughes-built satellites. The orbiter then began a series of maneuvers to meet up with the first of the two satellites to be recovered, Palapa B2. The orbits of both satellites had been lowered by ground commands from about 970 km (600 mi) to 340 km (210 mi) to facilitate recovery operations. On day five of the mission, Discovery rendezvoused with Palapa. Mission specialists Allen and Gardner performed an EVA, capturing the satellite with a device known as a "Stinger", or Apogee Capture Device (ACD), which was inserted into the satellite's apogee motor nozzle by Allen. The satellite's rotation was slowed to 1 RPM, and Gardner, operating from a position on the end of the Remote Manipulator System (RMS) (Canadarm), attempted unsuccessfully to grapple the satellite. Allen was able to manually maneuver the satellite into its cradle with Gardner's help, further aided by the Canadarm, which was operated by Fisher. The successful, improvised rescue effort took two hours.

The recovery of Westar 6 was not as difficult, and took place a day later. This time, Gardner, using the same muscle-power technique Allen had used for Palapa B2's rescue, easily captured the satellite. With Allen's help, he placed it in a cradle in the cargo bay. Following Westar 6's recovery, Gardner humorously held up a "For Sale" sign, as if trying to find someone to sell the malfunctioning satellites to, as a means to indicate the successful recovery and provide some comical relief for the troubled owners. The Westar satellite was, ironically enough, indeed later sold to Hong Kong–based AsiaSat.

The STS-51-A mission also carried the Diffused Mixing of Organic Solutions (DMOS) experiment. It was the first of a series of comprehensive organic and polymer science experiments sponsored by 3M. This mid-deck experiment was successful, and the proprietary results of the chemical mixes were turned over to 3M. One other experiment, a radiation monitoring experiment, was also performed.

The satellite recoveries on STS-51-A were the last untethered spacewalks until 1994, and marked the last use of the Manned Maneuvering Unit (MMU). In 1994, the Simplified Aid For EVA Rescue (SAFER) was tested on STS-64. On all subsequent spacewalks conducted by both NASA and the Soviet/Russian space agencies, the astronauts were tethered to the craft by some means.

The second mission of Discovery ended at 6:59:56 a.m. EST on November 16, 1984, with a successful landing on Runway 15 at KSC. Footage of the landing was used in opening scene of the 1985 IMAX movie The Dream is Alive. The flight completed 127 orbits, and lasted 7 days, 23 hours, 44 minutes, and 56 seconds. It was the third shuttle landing at KSC, and the fifth and last shuttle mission of 1984.

== Mission insignia ==
STS-51-A Mission insignia depicts the Space Shuttle Discovery en route to Earth orbit for NASA's STS-51-A mission and is reminiscent of a soaring eagle, shown in the insignia. The red and white trailing stripes, the blue background, and the presence of the Eagle, generate memories of America's 208 year-old history and traditions. The two satellites orbiting the Earth backgrounded amidst a celestial scene are a universal representation of the versatility of the Space Shuttle. The two satellites it is meant to retrieve are also included as a more specific reference to the mission's main objective and a highlight of what part of the Shuttle's versatile mission capabilities she would be covering this time. White lettering against the blue border lists the surnames of the five-member crew. The six stars represent the five astronauts aboard plus the daughter of Fisher, the first mother in space.

== Wake-up calls ==
NASA began a tradition of playing music to astronauts during the Project Gemini, and first used music to wake up a flight crew during Apollo 15. Each track is specially chosen, often by the astronauts' families, and usually has a special meaning to an individual member of the crew, or is applicable to their daily activities.

Flight Day	Song	Artist/Composer
Day 2	"Marine Corps Hymn"	
Day 3	"Theme from For a Few Dollars More"	Ennio Morricone

== Gallery ==
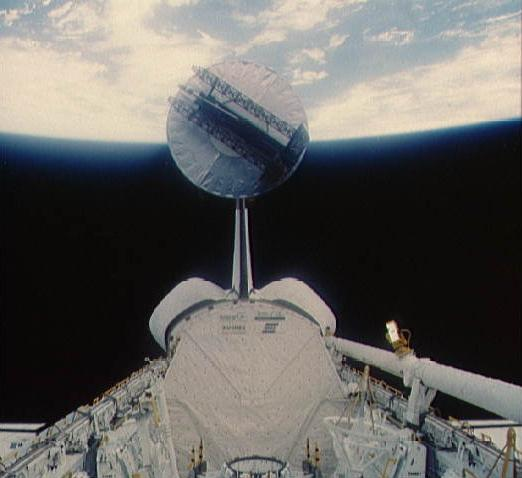
Syncom IV-1 after deployment

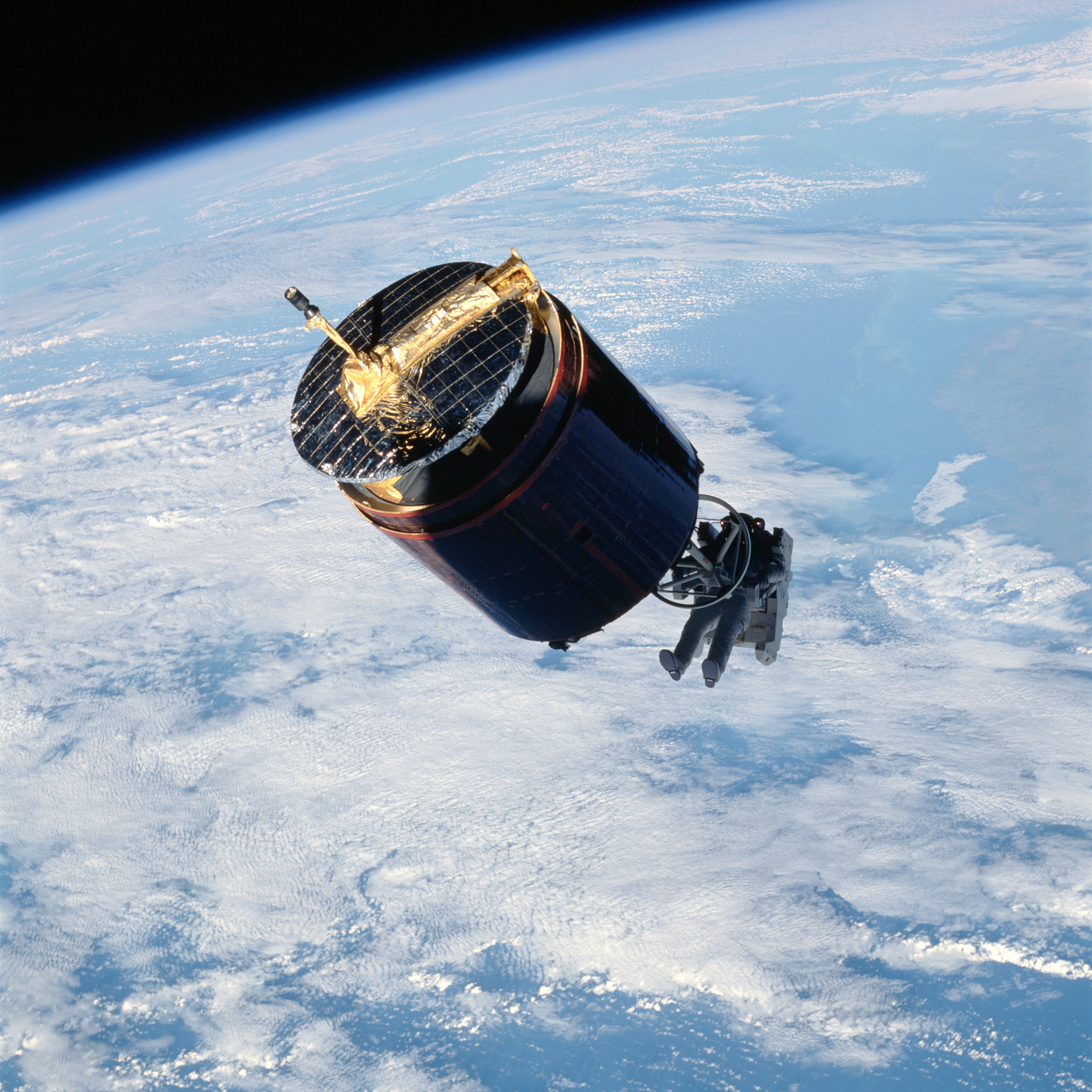
Dale Gardner retrieves Westar 6.

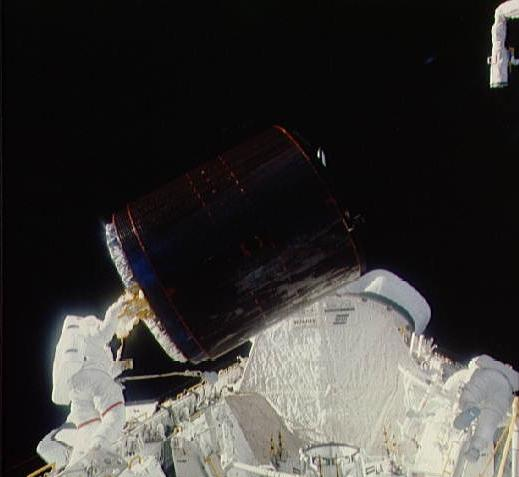
Palapa B2 is loaded into the payload bay.

== See also ==
- List of human spaceflights
- List of Space Shuttle missions
