= Palapa =

Series of Indonesian communications satellites

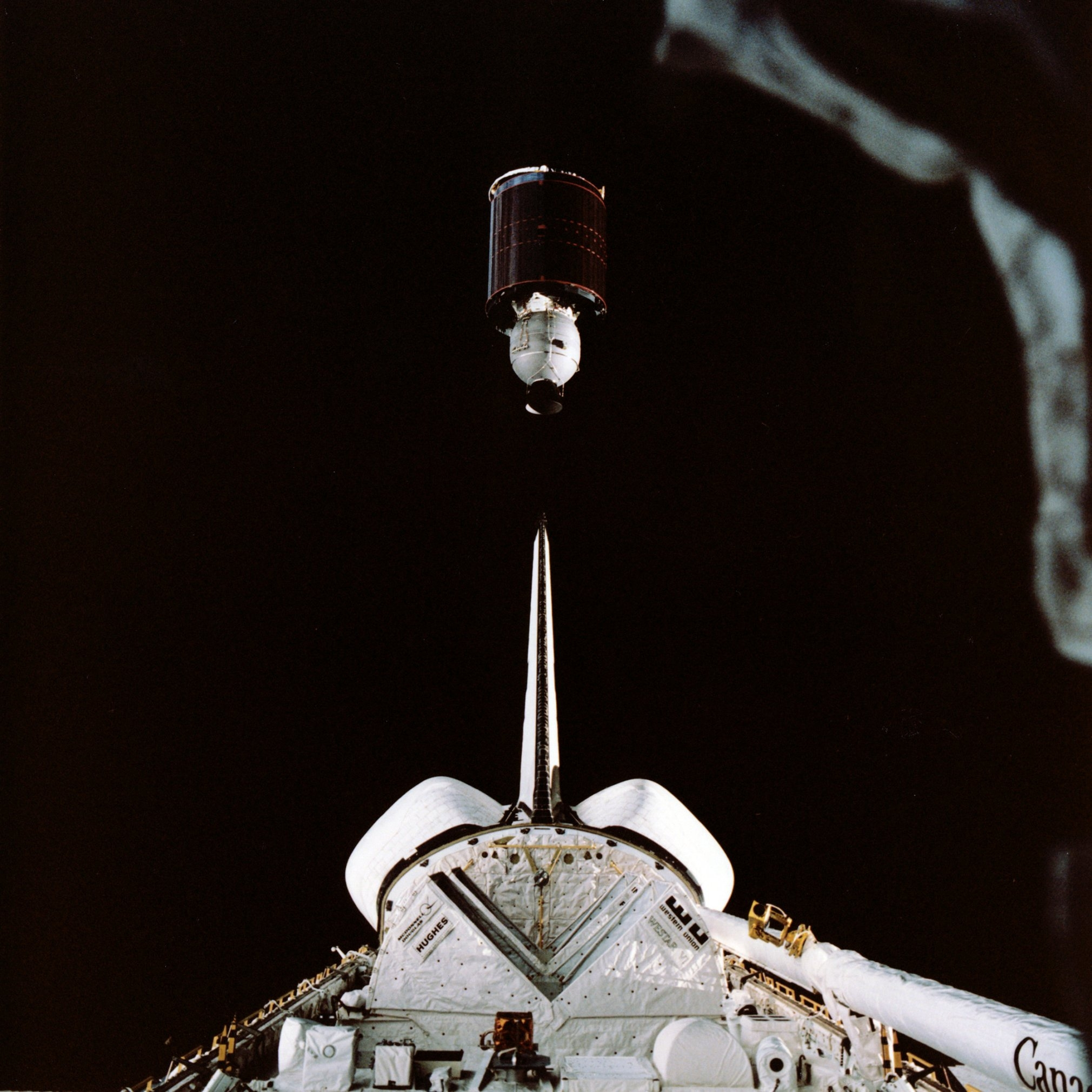
View of the Palapa-B2 satellite from Space Shuttle Challenger after deployment on STS-41B in 1984.

Palapa is a series of communications satellites owned by Indosat, an Indonesian telecommunications company (formerly by Perumtel and then by PT Satelit Palapa Indonesia/Satelindo). The first satellite was launched in July 1976, at which time Indonesia became the first developing country to operate its own domestic satellite system and the third after the United States and Canada. The estimated cost for the project was US$1 billion (equivalent to $4.28 billion in 2024).

== History ==
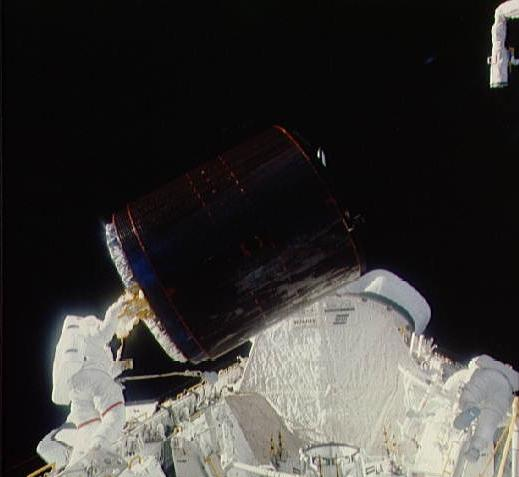
Palapa-B2, held by astronaut Joseph P. Allen, during the STS-51A mission.

The first satellite, Palapa-A1 of 300 kg (660 lb), was launched on 8 July 1976 at 23:31 UTC from the Kennedy Space Center by a Delta 2914 launch vehicle, or at 06:31 Indonesian Time on 9 July 1976. Palapa-A2 was launched on 10 March 1977.

The name "Palapa" was bestowed by then Indonesian president Suharto, after the Palapa oath sworn by Gajah Mada, the Prime Minister of Majapahit Kingdom, in 1334. According to the Pararaton (Book of Kings), Gajah Mada swore that he would not taste any palapa (historians suggest it refers to spice or a kind of flavouring) as long as he had not succeeded in unifying Nusantara (the Indonesian archipelago). After watching the launching of the satellite via television in Jakarta, President Suharto revealed his reason on naming the satellite "palapa"; to show that Indonesia had a glorious past, and also hope that the system could unite the archipelago.

Palapa-B1, which are based on Hughes HS-376 bus, was deployed by the STS-7 shuttle mission on 18 June 1983. Palapa-B2 was launched from STS-41-B on 3 February 1984, to be put into service afterward, but the perigee kick motor (also known as the Payload Assist Module, or PAM) on the satellite failed during its approach to geosynchronous orbit, placing it at an improper and inoperable low Earth orbit. It was retrieved on 16 November 1984 by the STS-51A mission of NASA's Space Shuttle, where it was brought back to Earth. The Space Shuttle mission to retrieve Palapa-B2, as well as the Westar 6 satellite which shared the launch payload with Palapa-B2, was partially funded by the insurance companies (led by Lloyd's of London) which insured the launch of those two satellites. Palapa-B2P was launched on 20 March 1987. Palapa-B2 was renamed as Palapa-B2R and relaunched on 13 April 1990. Palapa-B4 was launched on 14 May 1992.

Palapa-C1 was launched on 1 February 1996, followed by Palapa-C2 on 16 May 1996.

The Palapa-D satellite was manufactured by Thales Alenia Space and launched aboard a Chinese Long March 3B launch vehicle on 31 August 2009. However, it failed to reach the intended orbit following a failure of the third stage of the launch vehicle to reignite as planned. The Spacebus satellite bus was maneuvered into the correct geosynchronous orbit by September 2009, but this left it with only enough fuel for 10 years in orbit. This US$200 million satellite (equivalent to $283 million in 2024) has more transponders than its predecessors (40 transponders, Palapa-C2 only has 36). Sixteen (40%) of its transponders are used by Indosat for their own purposes while the other 24 (60%) are rented to others. Indosat used Palapa-D for their broadband internet service (IM2) with Ku-band technology (12/14 GHz). At the end of October 2009, Palapa D started its airing operations.

== Lighthouse project ==
The Palapa project was one of the "Lighthouse projects" instituted during the New Order period to build national pride. Other lighthouse projects during the New Order included transport infrastructure, the Taman Mini Indonesia Indah theme park and the country's national aircraft company. Most of these involved extravagant inauguration ceremonies with the officials who oversaw the projects in the spotlight. At the inauguration ceremony of the Palapa satellite system, President Suharto used a switch with 17 jewels (17 August is the date of Indonesia's Proclamation of Independence) in the shape of a traditional dagger (kris). Besides symbolizing national unity and concretely helping to unite the country by serving its purpose as communication infrastructure, the satellite also tied advanced technology to Javanese tradition as epitomized by the inauguration ceremony.
