= Long March 3 =

Chinese orbital carrier rocket

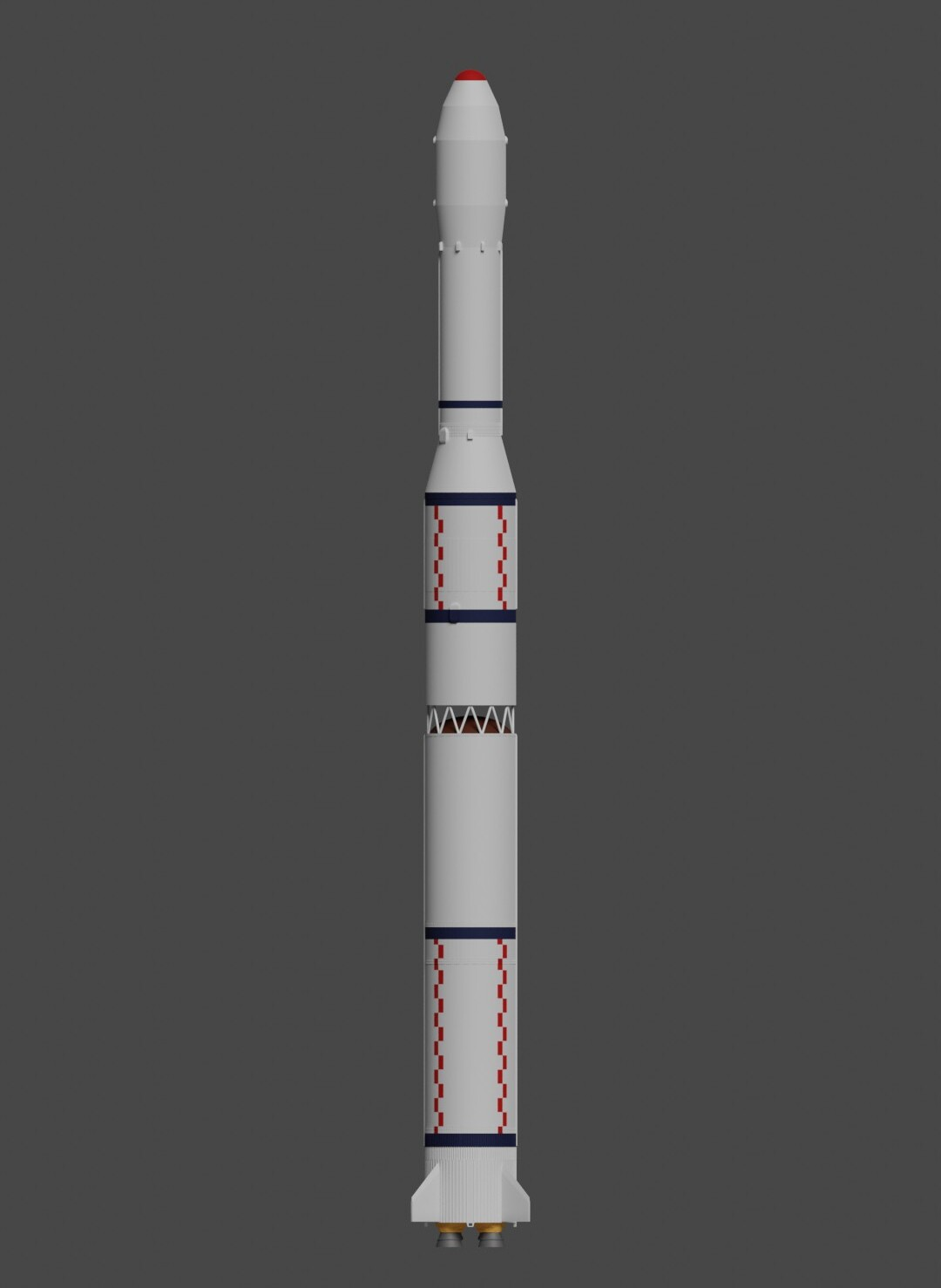
- Rendering of Long March 3
- Function: Medium-lift launch vehicle
- Manufacturer: China Academy of Launch Vehicle Technology
- Country of origin: China

Size
- Height: 43.25 metres (141.9 ft)
- Diameter: 3.35 metres (11.0 ft)
- Mass: 204,000 kilograms (450,000 lb)
- Stages: 3

Capacity

Payload to LEO
- Mass: 5,000 kilograms (11,000 lb)

Payload to GTO
- Mass: 1,500 kilograms (3,300 lb)

Associated rockets
- Family: Long March
- Derivative work: Long March 3A

Launch history
- Status: Retired
- Launch sites: LA-3, XSLC
- Total launches: 13
- Success(es): 10
- Failure: 2
- Partial failure: 1
- First flight: 29 January 1984
- Last flight: 25 June 2000

First stage
- Height: 23.49 m
- Diameter: 3.35 m
- Empty mass: 9,378 kg (20,675 lb)
- Gross mass: 153,070 kg (337,460 lb)
- Propellant mass: 143,692 kg (316,787 lb)
- Powered by: 4 YF-21B
- Maximum thrust: 2,961.6 kN (665,800 lb_{f})
- Specific impulse: 2,556.2 m/s (260.66 s)
- Burn time: 121 s
- Propellant: N_{2}O_{4} / UDMH

Second stage
- Height: 9.47 m
- Diameter: 3.35 m
- Empty mass: 3,599 kg (7,934 lb)
- Gross mass: 39,440 kg (86,950 lb)
- Propellant mass: 35,841 kg (79,016 lb)
- Powered by: 1 YF-24D (1 x YF-22D (Main)) (4 x YF-23F (Vernier))
- Maximum thrust: 741.4 kN (166,700 lb_{f}) (Main); 47.1 kN (10,600 lb_{f}) (Vernier)
- Specific impulse: 2,922.4 m/s (298.00 s) (Main); 2,762 m/s (281.6 s) (Vernier)
- Burn time: 130 s
- Propellant: N_{2}O_{4} / UDMH

Third stage
- Height: 10.36 m
- Diameter: 2.25 m
- Empty mass: 1,965 kg (4,332 lb)
- Gross mass: 10,700 kg (23,600 lb)
- Propellant mass: 8,731 kg (19,249 lb)
- Powered by: 1 YF-73
- Maximum thrust: 44.43 kN (9,990 lb_{f})
- Specific impulse: 4,119 m/s (420.0 s)
- Burn time: 729 s
- Propellant: LH_{2} / LOX

The Long March 3 (Chinese: 长征三号火箭), also known as the Changzheng 3, CZ-3 and LM-3, was a Chinese orbital carrier rocket design. They were all launched from Launch Area 3 at the Xichang Satellite Launch Center. It was a three-stage rocket, intended for GTO launch, and was mostly used to place DFH-2-class communications satellites into geosynchronous transfer orbits. The first 2 stages were derived from the Long March 2C.

It was complemented and later replaced by the more powerful Long March 3A, which has an improved third stage.

== Launch statistics ==
Original LM 3 only.

- Failure
- Partial failure
- Success
- Planned

== List of launches ==
Flight number	Date (UTC)	Launch site	Payload	Orbit	Result
1	29 January 1984; 12:25	LA-3, XSLC	STTW 1	GTO (intended)	Partial Failure
2	8 April 1984; 11:20	LA-3, XSLC	STTW 2	GTO	Success
3	1 February 1986; 12:37	LA-3, XSLC	DFH-2-1	GTO	Success
4	7 March 1988; 12:41	LA-3, XSLC	DFH-2A-1 (ChinaSat 1)	GTO	Success
5	22 December 1988; 12:40	LA-3, XSLC	DFH-2A-2 (ChinaSat 2)	GTO	Success
6	4 February 1990; 12:28	LA-3, XSLC	DFH-2A-3 (ChinaSat 3)	GTO	Success
7	7 April 1990; 13:30	LA-3, XSLC	AsiaSat 1	GTO	Success
8	28 December 1991; 12:00	LA-3, XSLC	DFH-2A-4 (ChinaSat 4)	GTO (intended)	Failure
9	21 July 1994; 10:55	LA-3, XSLC	APStar 1	GTO	Success
10	3 July 1996; 10:47	LA-3, XSLC	APStar 1A	GTO	Success
11	18 August 1996; 10:27	LA-3, XSLC	ChinaSat 7	GTO (intended)	Failure
12	10 June 1997; 12:01	LA-3, XSLC	Fengyun 2A	GTO	Success
13	25 June 2000; 11:50	LA-3, XSLC	Fengyun 2B	GTO	Success

== Launch failures ==
=== Dong Fang Hong 2 launch failure ===
On 29 January 1984, a LM-3 rocket failed during launch. The third stage failed 4 s after restart for GTO insertion of the satellite, due to incorrect mixture ratio in the engine gas generator, which caused high temperatures and burned out the turbine casing. However, many planned tests on the experimental communications spacecraft were still carried out in the resulting elliptical orbit.

=== ChinaSat 4 launch failure ===
On 28 December 1991, a LM-3 rocket failed during launch. The third-stage engine suffered a loss of turbine speed and combustion pressure 58 s after re-igniting for the second burn for GTO insertion and shut down completely 135 s after re-ignition. Loss of pressure in the high-pressure helium supply used for engine control had reduced the propellant flow.

=== ChinaSat 7 launch failure ===
On 18 August 1996, a LM-3 rocket failed during launch. The third-stage engine shut down roughly 40 s earlier than planned because of a fire in the LH2 injector of the gas generator. Insufficient purging had permitted oxygen to freeze in the gas generator during flight.

== Including other LM-3 variants ==
=== Specifications of all LM-3 types ===
Specifications
Series	3	3A	3B	3B/E	3C	3C/E
Model	Long March 3	Long March 3A	Long March 3B	Long March 3B/E	Long March 3C	Long March 3C/E
Stages	3	3	3 (plus 4 strap-on boosters)	3 (plus 4 strap-on boosters)	3 (plus 2 strap-on boosters)	3 (plus 2 strap-on boosters)
Length (m)	43.2	52.5	54.8	56.3	54.8	56.3
Max. diameter (m)	3.35	3.35	3.35	3.35	3.35	3.35
Liftoff mass (t)	204	241	426	459	345	378
Liftoff thrust (kN)	2,962	2,962	5,923	5,923	4,442	4,442
Payload (LEO, kg)	5,000	8,500	11,500	11,500	8,000	8,000
Payload (GTO, kg)	1,500	2,600	5,100	5,500	3,800	3,900

== Launch history for all LM-3 types ==
The following launch statistics are gathered from the individual Wikipedia pages of each CZ-3x variants as those pages are updated more frequently by various editors; the numbers are current as of 15 December 2025.

Long March 3 (rocket family)
Derivatives	Status	First flight	Launches	Successes	Failures	Partial failures
Long March 3	Retired	29 January 1984	13	10	2	1
Long March 3A	Retired	8 February 1994	27	27	0	0
Long March 3B	Retired	14 February 1996	12	10	1	1
Long March 3B/E	Active	13 May 2007	101	99	1	1
Long March 3C	Retired	25 April 2008	12	12	0	0
Long March 3C/E	Active	23 October 2014	8	8	0	0
