= Payload Assist Module =

Single-stage solid-fueled booster stage

PAM-D with the Phoenix spacecraft. The stage is successively spun, fired, yo-yo de-spun and jettisoned.

The Payload Assist Module (PAM) is a modular upper stage designed and built by McDonnell Douglas (Boeing), using Thiokol Star-series solid propellant rocket motors. The PAM was used with the Space Shuttle, Delta, and Titan launchers and carried satellites from low Earth orbit to a geostationary transfer orbit or an interplanetary course. The payload was spin stabilized by being mounted on a rotating plate. Originally developed for the Space Shuttle, different versions of the PAM were developed:

- PAM-A (Atlas class), development terminated; originally to be used on both the Atlas and Space Shuttle, designed for satellites up to 4,400 lb (2,000 kg)
- PAM-D (Delta class), uses a Star-48B rocket motor, designed for satellites up to 2,750 lb (1,250 kg)
- PAM-DII (Delta class), uses a Star-63 rocket motor, designed for satellites up to 4,150 lb (1,880 kg)
- PAM-S (Special), uses a Star-48B as a kick motor for the space probe Ulysses

The PAM-D module was used as an optional third stage of the classic Delta rocket. The PAM-D was discontinued after the Challenger accident. A simplified 3rd stage using the STAR-48 motor was employed on Delta II.

== 2001 re-entry incident ==
On January 12, 2001, a PAM-D module re-entered the atmosphere after a "catastrophic orbital decay". The PAM-D stage, which had been used to launch the GPS satellite 2A-11 in 1993, crashed in the sparsely populated Saudi Arabian desert, where it was positively identified.

== Retiremnent ==
The Payload Assist Module was retired from service following its final flight on August 17, 2009, when a PAM-D upper stage was used aboard a Delta II 7925 rocket to launch the GPS IIR-21(M) (USA-206) navigation satellite from Space Launch Complex 17A at Cape Canaveral Air Force Station, Florida.

== Gallery ==
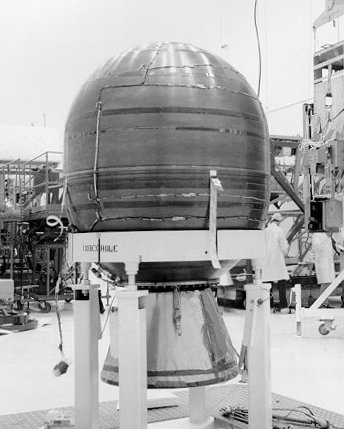
PAM-D stage in assembly

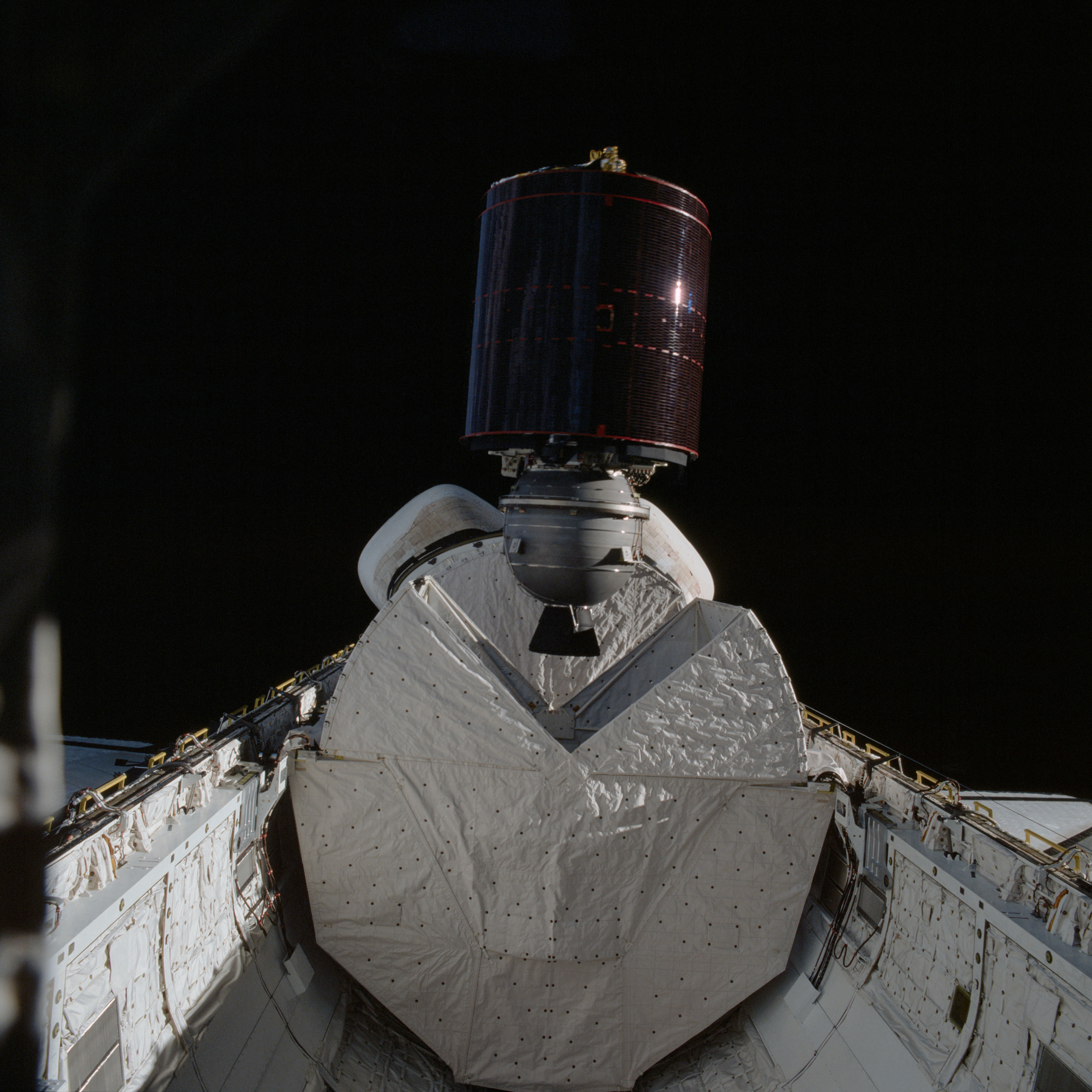
SBS-3 satellite with PAM-D stage being launched from Space Shuttle Columbia

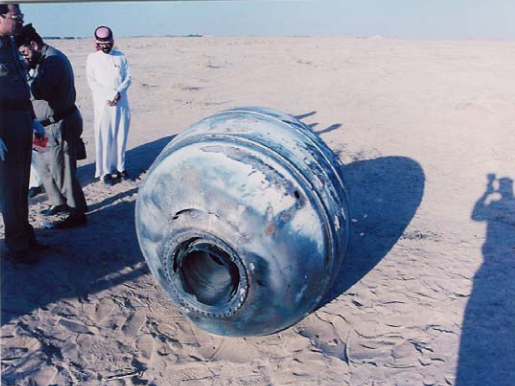
Saudi officials inspect a PAM-D module that re-entered the atmosphere in 2001

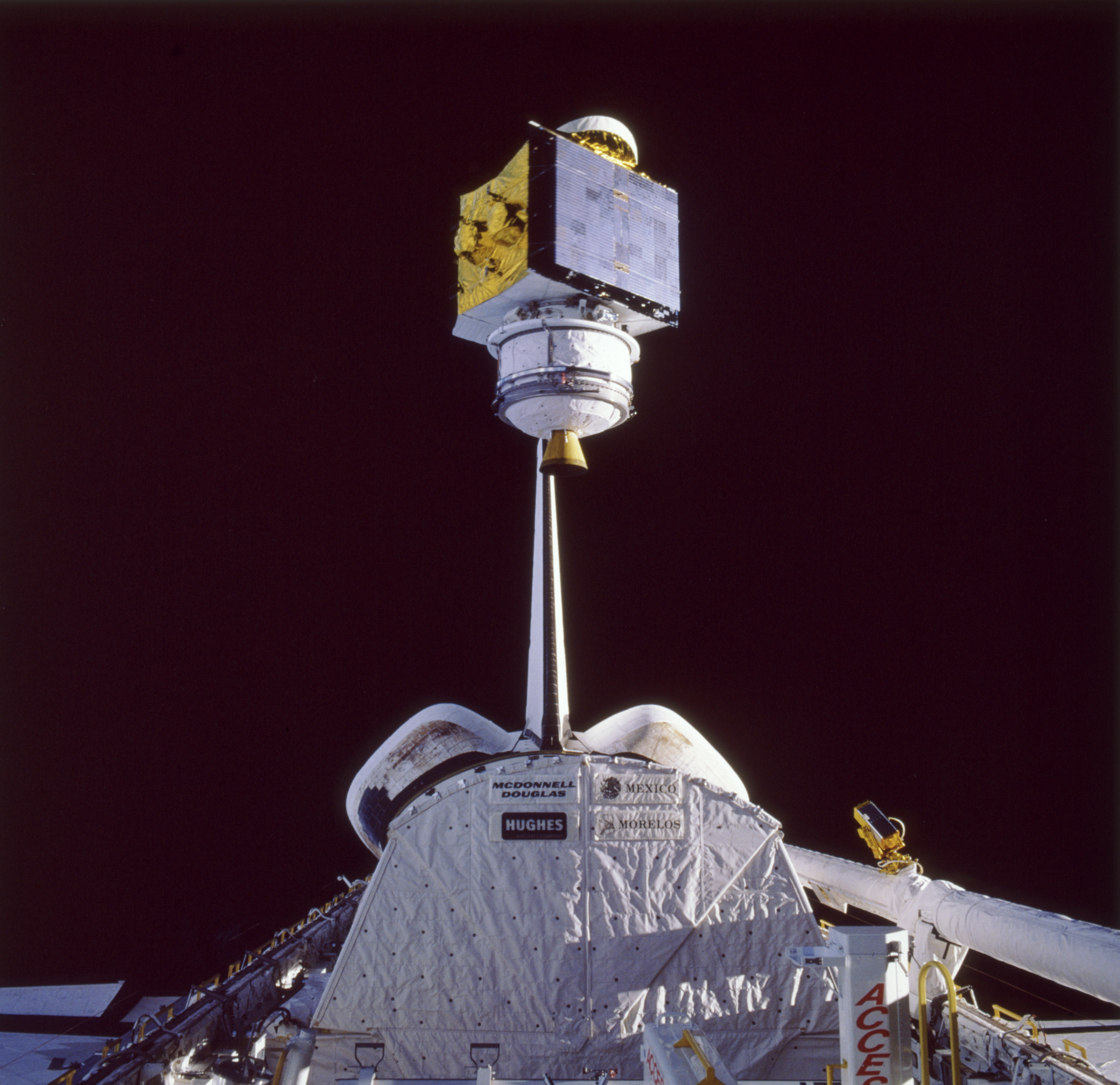
SATCOM KU-2 attached to a PAM-DII is being released from the cargo bay of the Space Shuttle Orbiter Atlantis during STS-61B

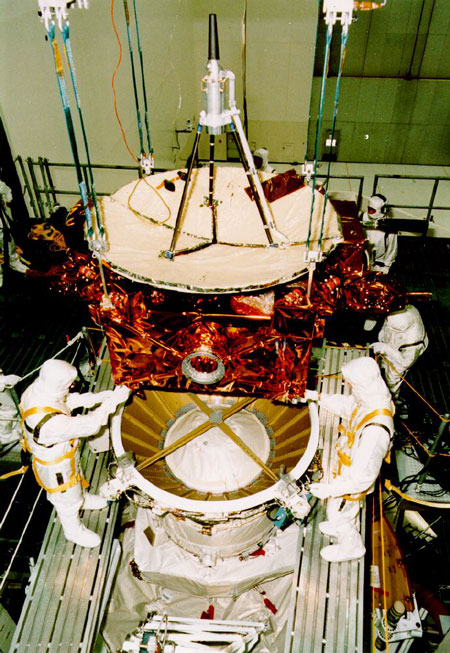
Ulysses is mated with the PAM-S
