= Laffont =

Laffont is a surname. Notable people with the surname include:

- Axelle Laffont (born 1970), French actress and comedian
- Eliane Laffont (born 1944), American image consultant
- Jean-Jacques Laffont (1947–2004), French economist
- Jean-Pierre Laffont (born 1935), Algerian-French-American photojournalist
- Patrice Laffont (1939–2024), French TV personality
- Perrine Laffont (born 1998). French freestyle skier
- Robert Laffont (1916–2010), French founder of Éditions Robert Laffont

== Other uses ==
- Éditions Robert Laffont, a French book publisher
- Jean-Jacques Laffont Foundation, a private economics research foundation of France

== See also ==
- Lafont (surname)
- Fontaine (disambiguation)
- Font (disambiguation)
