= Lafont =

Lafont is a Southern French surname. Notable people with the surname include:

- Alban Lafont (born 1999), Ivorian football player
- Bernadette Lafont (1938–2013), French actress, mother of Pauline
- Bruno Lafont (born 1956), French businessman
- Charles Philippe Lafont (1781–1839), French violinist and composer
- Cristina Lafont (born 1963), American philosopher
- Dominique Lafont (born 1961), French businessperson
- Emmanuel Marie Philippe Louis Lafont (born 1945), Roman Catholic bishop of the Diocese of Cayenne in French Guiana
- Ernest Lafont (1879–1946), French socialist politician
- Eugène Lafont (1837–1908), Belgian Jesuit, Missionary in Bengal, scientist and founder of the first Scientific Society in India
- Henri Lafont (1902–1944), head of the French Gestapo during the German occupation in World War II
- Jean-Philippe Lafont (born 1951), French baritone
- Joseph de La Font (1686-1725), French playwright
- Louis Charles Georges Jules Lafont (1825–1908), French naval officer, Governor of Cochinchina from 1877 to 1879
- Marcelle Lafont (1905–1982) chemist, chemical engineer, member of the French Resistance and politician
- Marie-Zélia Lafont (born 1987), French canoeist
- Maurice Lafont (1927–2005), French football player
- Pauline Lafont (1963–1988), French actress
- Pierre-Chéri Lafont (1797–1873), French actor
- Robèrt Lafont (born 1923), French linguist, author, historian, expert in literature, political theoretician
- Sophie de Lafont (1717–1797), Russian educator

== See also ==
- Laffont (disambiguation)
- Fontaine (disambiguation)
- Font (disambiguation)
