= Francis Apesteguy =

French photographer (1952–2022)

- Born: 24 September 1952; Suresnes, France
- Died: 30 January 2022 (aged 69); Orgeval, Yvelines, France
- Occupation: Photographer

Francis Apesteguy (24 September 1952 – 30 January 2022) was a French independent reporter-photographer. He was known as a paparazzo, working for Sipa Press, Daniel Angeli, and Gamma.

== Biography ==
Apesteguy began his career in photography in fashion and advertising as an assistant to Helmut Newton. He soon became a photojournalist in Northern Ireland and was working for Sipa Press and Daniel Angeli's agency. On 27 September 1972, he got his first scoop, capturing a fire which broke out on a building on the Champs-Élysées and a woman who jumped from the building. France-Soir published the photograph in its next daily edition.

In July 1977, Apesteguy joined the agency Gamma, with which he worked until December 1997. In May 1978, he was sent to Chad to capture photographs of Opération Tacaud. Upon his arrival, he was arrested and his equipment was confiscated. Suspected of being a Libyan spy, he managed to escape. In 1981, he was one of the main characters in the documentary Reporter, directed by Raymond Depardon.

In 2014, Apesteguy was one of seven French paparazzi whose photographs appeared in an exhibition at the Centre Pompidou-Metz. In March 2015, he launched the Manifeste de l’indignation à l’intention des artistes créateurs et du Ministère de la Justice in support of his colleague, Marie-Laure de Decker at Gamma. He lived and worked in Ézy-sur-Eure, where he was employed by Studio Hans Lucas.

Apesteguy died on 30 January 2022, at the age of 69.
