= Alfred Yaghobzadeh =

Iranian photographer of Assyrian descent

- آلفرد يعقوب زاده
- Born: Tehran, Iran
- Known for: Photojournalist, author

Alfred Yaghobzadeh (Persian: آلفرد يعقوب زاده), is an Iranian photographer of Assyrian descent who is noted for his war photography.

== Early life and career ==
Yaghobzadeh was born in Tehran, to an Armenian-Assyrian family. His photographs in Iran during the 1979 Iranian Revolution and during the Iran–Iraq War led to his work for the Associated Press, Gamma, and Sygma news agencies. Since 1983 Yaghobzadeh has photographed for the Sipa Press. and his photos have also appeared in Time, Newsweek, Stern, Paris Match, El País and GEO.

Yaghobzadeh has covered armed conflicts and wars in Cuba, Uzbekistan, Afghanistan, Somalia, the Israeli–Palestinian conflict and the Lebanese Civil War. In Lebanon, he was wounded and taken hostage, and in Chechnya he was wounded by a tank shell.

In 2006, Yaghobzadeh and French journalist Caroline Laurent were kidnapped by a Palestinian faction while they were working in Gaza on a story about the lives of Palestinian women for the French magazine Elle.

Yaghobzadeh has also explored the release of repressed Christianity in Eastern Europe following the collapse of communism. Published as Christianity around the World, Yaghobzadeh documented religious rites and rituals in 24 countries over the course of a decade.

Yaghobzadeh has published three photo books: War Iran-Iraq, Faces of War and Promised Peace. He has also won several prestigious photograph awards including the prize from the World Press Photo and the American Overseas Press Club.

Yaghobzadeh was injured while covering the Egyptian Revolution of 2011.

In October 2026, as he covered the protests in Paris, Yaghobzadeh was hit by a sound grenade, injuring his back and leg. He later said it was not yet clear whether the grenade had been thrown by police or protesters, and that he was still recovering.

== See also ==
- Culture of Iran
- Hassan Jangju
- Islamic art
- Iranian art
- Iranian art and architecture
- List of Iranian artists
- List of iconic photographs
