= Tomislav Peternek =

Yugoslav photographer

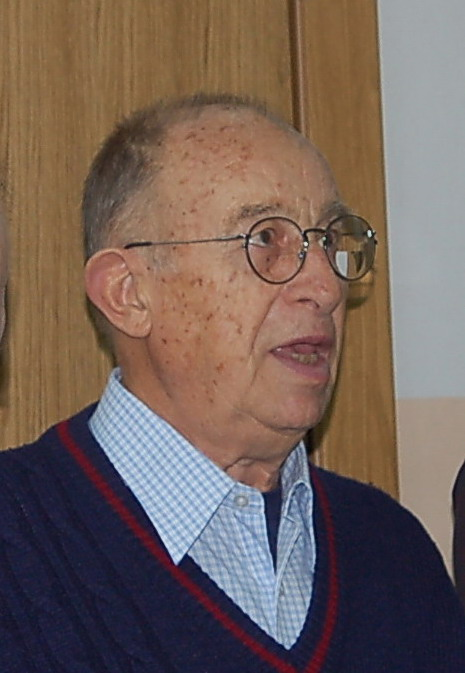
- Peternek at the opening of Milan Živković's exhibition in Belgrade, November 2007.
- Born: May 22, 1933; Vinkovci, Kingdom of Yugoslavia
- Died: March 24, 2024 (aged 90); Belgrade, Serbia
- Known for: Photography

Tomislav Peternek (22 May 1933 – 24 March 2024) was a Yugoslav photographer and artist. He spent most of his life as a photojournalist making covers for Belgrade's NIN. He held over 60 solo exhibitions in Yugoslavia and other countries.

== Biography ==
Peternek was born on May 22, 1933, in Vinkovci, where he graduated from high school. He is of Czech origin. He started photographing in 1954 and soon started working as a photojournalist for Svetlost in Kragujevac. While in Kragujevac, he also worked for a while at the Šumadija radio factory.

Peternek moved to Belgrade and continued working in newspaper publications such as Borba, Sport i svet, Mladost, Jugoslovenska revija and Ekonomska politika. He photographed the consequences of the 1963 Skopje earthquake and half a century later presented them at an exhibition in Skopje.

Starting from 1970 he became the photo editor of the Belgrade weekly NIN. He remained in that position until his retirement in 1993. He published around seven hundred front pages of this political magazine. Along with his work in photojournalism, Peternek was also involved in commercial and fashion photography.

He was a participant in numerous group exhibitions of photography, a member of The Applied Artists and Designers Association of Serbia (ULUPUDS), and the Association of Journalists of Yugoslavia and Serbia.

At the Yugoslav Institute of Journalism, he started an educational course for photojournalists in 1985. As a department mentor, he educated over three hundred students, most of whom are active in the field of news photography.

Since 1980 he has also done underwater photography – he has photographed in the Adriatic Sea, the Caribbean Sea, Indian Ocean and the Red Sea. He started working as a freelance photographer in 1993. He was an accredited correspondent at the Ministry of Information of Yugoslavia from major photo agencies; Reuters, Eastlight, Contrast, UNICEF and Corbis-Sygma.

Peternek is the father of journalist and presenter Tanja Peternek Aleksić and grandfather of actress Tamara Aleksić. In 2009 he published Peternek: Life with photography (Peternek: život s fotografijom, Belgrade: ReFoto, 2009).

He died on March 24, 2024, in Belgrade at the age of 91.

== Titles ==
- Member of SULUJ since 1960.
- Master of Photography of the Photo Association of Yugoslavia since 1967.
- Artist FIAPF (AFIAPF) since 1967, Excellency FIAPF (EFIAPF) since 1973.

== Legacy ==
The "Tomin šešir" award is named after Peternek.
