= Leslie Stone =

Leslie Stone may refer to:

- O. Leslie Stone (1903–1986), general authority of the Church of Jesus Christ of Latter-day Saints
- Leslie F. Stone (1905–1991), American writer

== See also ==
- Les Stone (born 1959), American photojournalist
