= Anna Lee Fisher =

American astronaut and physician (born 1949)

Anna Fisher
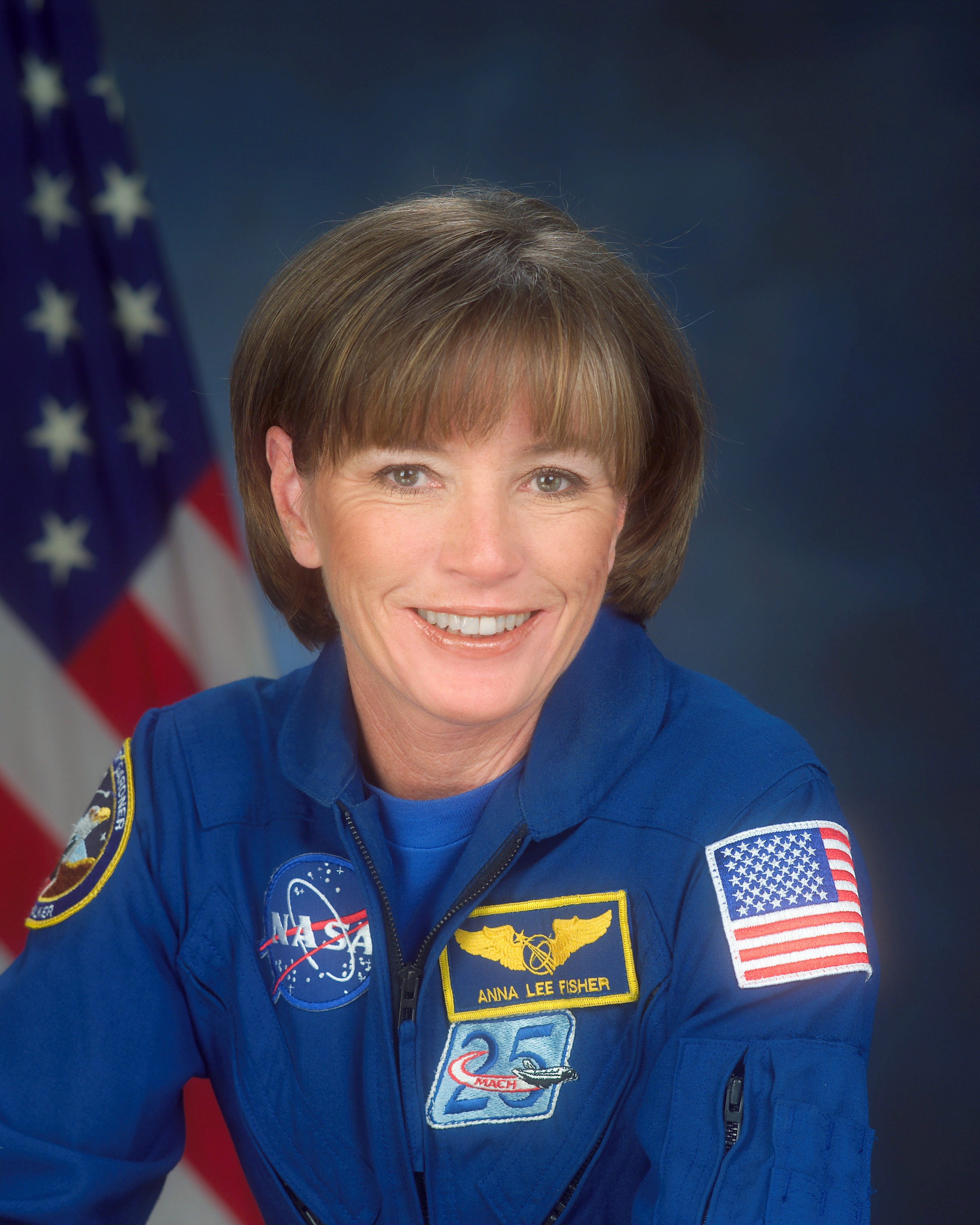
- Fisher in 2002
- Born: Anna Lee Tingle; August 24, 1949 (age 77); Albany, New York, U.S.
- Education: University of California, Los Angeles (BS, MD, MS)
- Spouse: William Frederick Fisher (m. 1977; div. 2000)
- Children: 2, including Kristin
- Awards: NASA Space Flight Medal (1984); NASA Exceptional Service Medal (1988, 1998)
- Space career

NASA astronaut
- Time in space: 7d 23h 45m
- Selection: NASA Group 8 (1978)
- Mission: STS-51-A
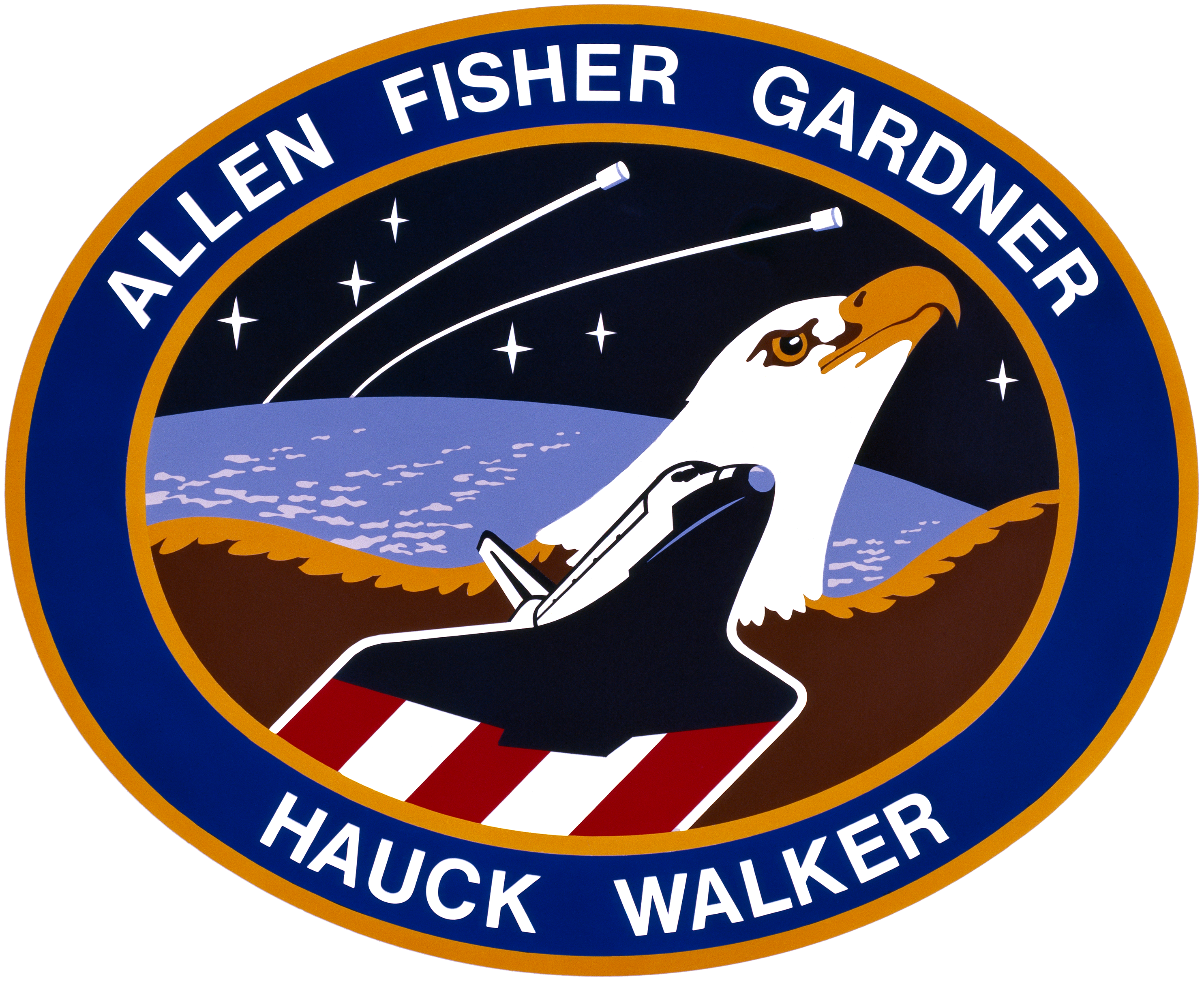
- Mission insignia

Anna Lee Fisher (née Tingle; born August 24, 1949) is an American chemist, emergency physician and a former NASA astronaut. Formerly married to fellow astronaut Bill Fisher, and the mother of two children, in 1984 she became the first mother to fly in space. During her career at NASA, she was involved with three major programs: the Space Shuttle, the International Space Station and the Orion spacecraft.

A graduate of University of California, Los Angeles (UCLA), where she earned a Bachelor of Science degree in chemistry in 1971, Fisher started graduate school in chemistry, conducting X-ray crystallographic studies of metallocarboranes. The following year she moved to the UCLA School of Medicine, where she received her Doctor of Medicine degree in 1976. She completed her internship at Harbor General Hospital in Torrance, California, in 1977, and chose to specialize in emergency medicine.

Fisher was selected as an astronaut candidate with NASA Astronaut Group 8, the first group of NASA astronauts to include women, in January 1978. She became the Astronaut Office representative for the development and testing of the Canadarm remote manipulator system and the testing of payload bay door contingency spacewalk procedures. For the first four Space Shuttle missions she was assigned to the search and rescue helicopters supporting the flights. For the next four missions, she was involved in the verification of flight software at the Shuttle Avionics Integration Laboratory (SAIL), and was a "Cape Crusader"—one of the astronauts who supported vehicle integration and payload testing at Kennedy Space Center. She flew in space on the Space Shuttle Discovery on the STS-51-A mission in November 1984, during which she used the Canadarm to retrieve two satellites that had been placed in incorrect orbits.

After a leave of absence to raise her family from 1989 to 1995, Fisher returned to the Astronaut Office, where she worked on procedures and training issues in support of the International Space Station (ISS). She was a capsule communicator (CAPCOM) from January 2011 to August 2013, and the lead CAPCOM for ISS Expedition 33. She was involved in the development of the display for the Orion spacecraft until her retirement from NASA in April 2017.

== Early life and education ==
Anna Lee Tingle was born in Albany, New York, on August 24, 1949. Her mother Elfriede was born in Germany in 1918 but emigrated to the United States when she was sixteen years old. She went back to Germany to care for her grandmother, and was unable to return to the United States due to the outbreak of World War II. She served in the German military as a Morse code operator during the war. Afterwards, she worked in Berlin for the U.S. Army, where she met Riley F. Tingle. The two returned to the United States, where they were married in April 1949. Over the years the family moved about frequently, living on bases in the United States and Germany, and Tingle grew up as an Army brat. She speaks German fluently.

On May 5, 1961, when Tingle was in the seventh grade at Fort Campbell, Kentucky, her teacher brought in a transistor radio so the class could listen to the radio broadcast of Alan Shepard becoming the first American in space. For the first time Tingle contemplated the notion of becoming an astronaut. It seemed out of reach, as all the Mercury Seven astronauts were military test pilots, a profession from which women were excluded, but she figured that by the time she was old enough there would be space stations, which would need doctors. When she was in high school she volunteered at Harbor General Hospital in Torrance, California, but did not let go of the dream of flying in space. She graduated from San Pedro High School in 1967. Tingle entered the University of California, Los Angeles (UCLA) studying math. She decided that the job prospects were poor and switched to chemistry, graduating with her Bachelor of Science degree in chemistry in 1971. While there she married and divorced, and her surname changed to "Sims". She then spent a year in graduate school, conducting X-ray crystallographic studies of metallocarboranes, and published three articles in Inorganic Chemistry.

Noting a lack of employment opportunities for chemists who had earned PhDs, she decided to pursue medicine instead. The following year she moved to the UCLA School of Medicine, where she received her Doctor of Medicine (MD) degree in 1976. At the time, medicine was considered a "non-traditional" career for women, and there were only about 15 women in the medical school class of 150. She completed her internship at Harbor General Hospital in 1977. At Harbor General she met Bill Fisher, a fellow intern a year ahead of her. He too was a military brat—the son of a United States Air Force officer—and also hoped to one day fly in space. She chose to specialize in emergency medicine and worked in several hospitals in the Los Angeles area, doing eight 24-hour shifts per month.

Anna Lee Fisher in 1981

== NASA astronaut ==
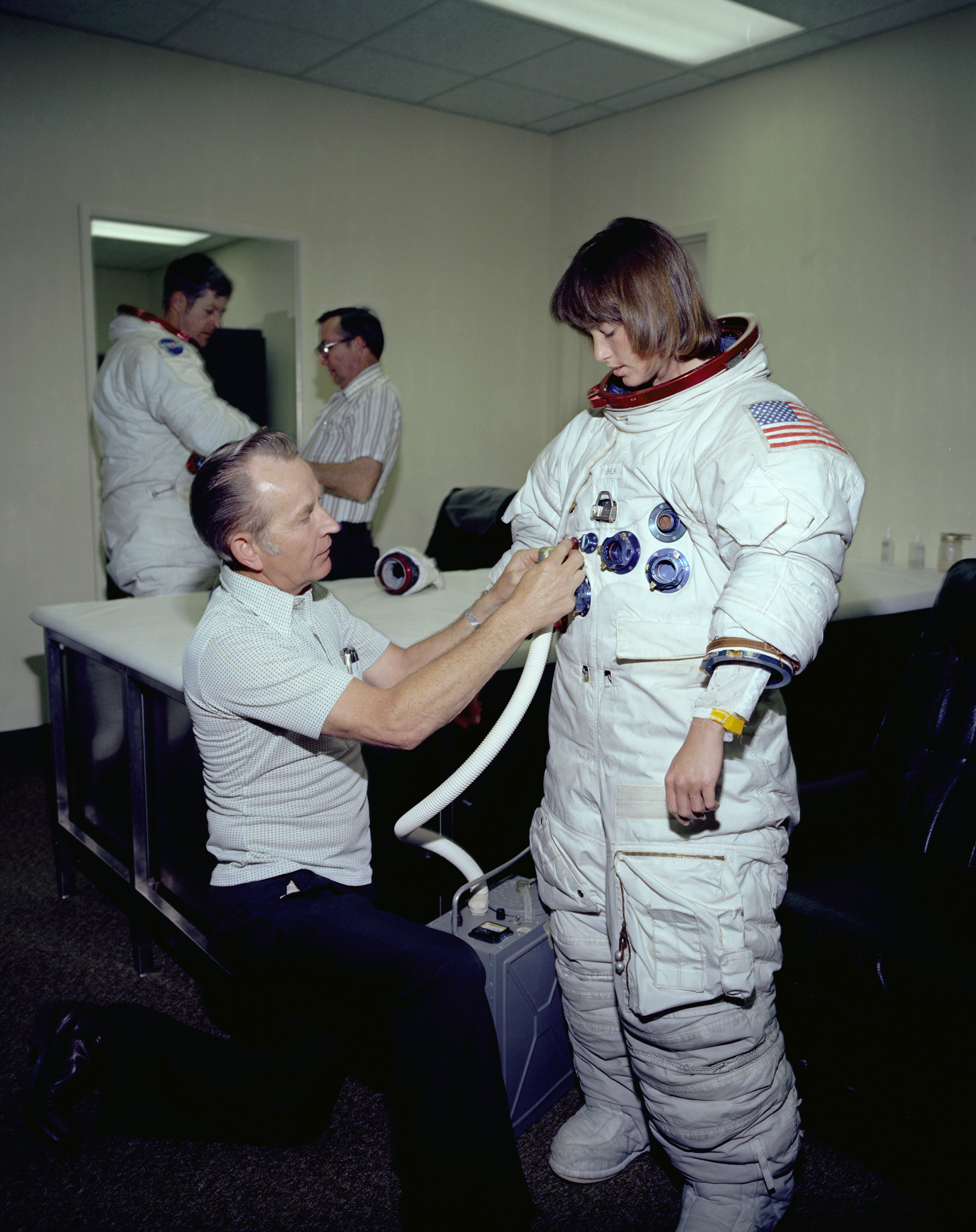
Being suited up. As one of the first woman astronauts, Fisher contributed to the design of a space suit tailored to the female anatomy.

=== Selection ===
Another doctor at Harbor General was Mark Mecikalski, who followed the American space program. At lunch in June 1977 he informed Bill, who was now Sims's fiancé, that the National Aeronautics and Space Administration (NASA) was conducting a selection of a new group of astronauts and recruiting doctors. Bill had Sims paged over the hospital loudspeaker system. They both applied, although they agreed that Sims had the better chance, due to her background in chemistry as well as medicine. They had three weeks to assemble the required documents and submit their applications. Sims posted hers the day before the deadline. NASA received 8,079 applications, and chose 208 for further screening. Sims was invited to come to the Johnson Space Center (JSC) in Houston, for a week of interviews, evaluations and examinations, commencing on August 29, 1977.

This was the week when Bill and Sims had planned to marry. They brought their wedding forward, and were married at Wayfarers Chapel in Rancho Palos Verdes, California, on August 23. She changed her surname to Fisher. She was part of the third group of twenty applicants to be interviewed, and the first one that included women. Among the eight women in the group were Rhea Seddon, Shannon Lucid, Nitza Cintron and Millie Hughes-Wiley. In the interview, Sims was asked if she wanted to have children, and she told them of her intention to have children within the next five years. Bill also received a call from NASA, and in November he was one of the ninth group of applicants to be interviewed. This group included Judith Resnik, who worked for Xerox in nearby El Segundo, California, and Resnik and the Fishers became friends.

In January 1978, Fisher received a call from George Abbey informing her that she had been selected as part of NASA Astronaut Group 8, and would commence on July 5. At the same time, he informed Bill that he had not been selected. Bill was the only unsuccessful applicant to be told of his rejection by Abbey; the job of informing unsuccessful candidates was normally delegated. Fisher was interviewed on television by Connie Chung. That night Bill took Fisher and Resnik, who had also been selected, out to dinner to celebrate. Bill and Fisher moved to Houston, where they bought a house in Clear Lake City. The new job involved a considerable pay cut; from earning about $50,000 per year (equivalent to $266,000 in 2025) as a surgical resident, she dropped down to a government salary of around $23,000 a year (equivalent to $122,000 in 2025). "It didn't matter what the pay was", she told People magazine. "To be an astronaut, I was willing to pay them."

=== Training ===
Group 8's name for itself was "TFNG". The abbreviation was deliberately ambiguous; for public purposes, it stood for "Thirty-Five New Guys", but within the group itself, it was known to stand for the military phrase, "the fucking new guy", used to denote newcomers to a military unit. Officially, they were astronaut candidates; they would not become fully-fledged astronauts until their training was complete. Much of the first eight months of their training was in the classroom. Because there were so many of them, the TFNGs did not fit easily into the existing classrooms, so they were split into two groups, red and blue, led by Rick Hauck and John Fabian respectively. Fisher was placed in the blue group. Water survival training was conducted with the 3613th Combat Crew Training Squadron at Homestead Air Force Base in Florida and parasail training at Vance Air Force Base in Oklahoma.

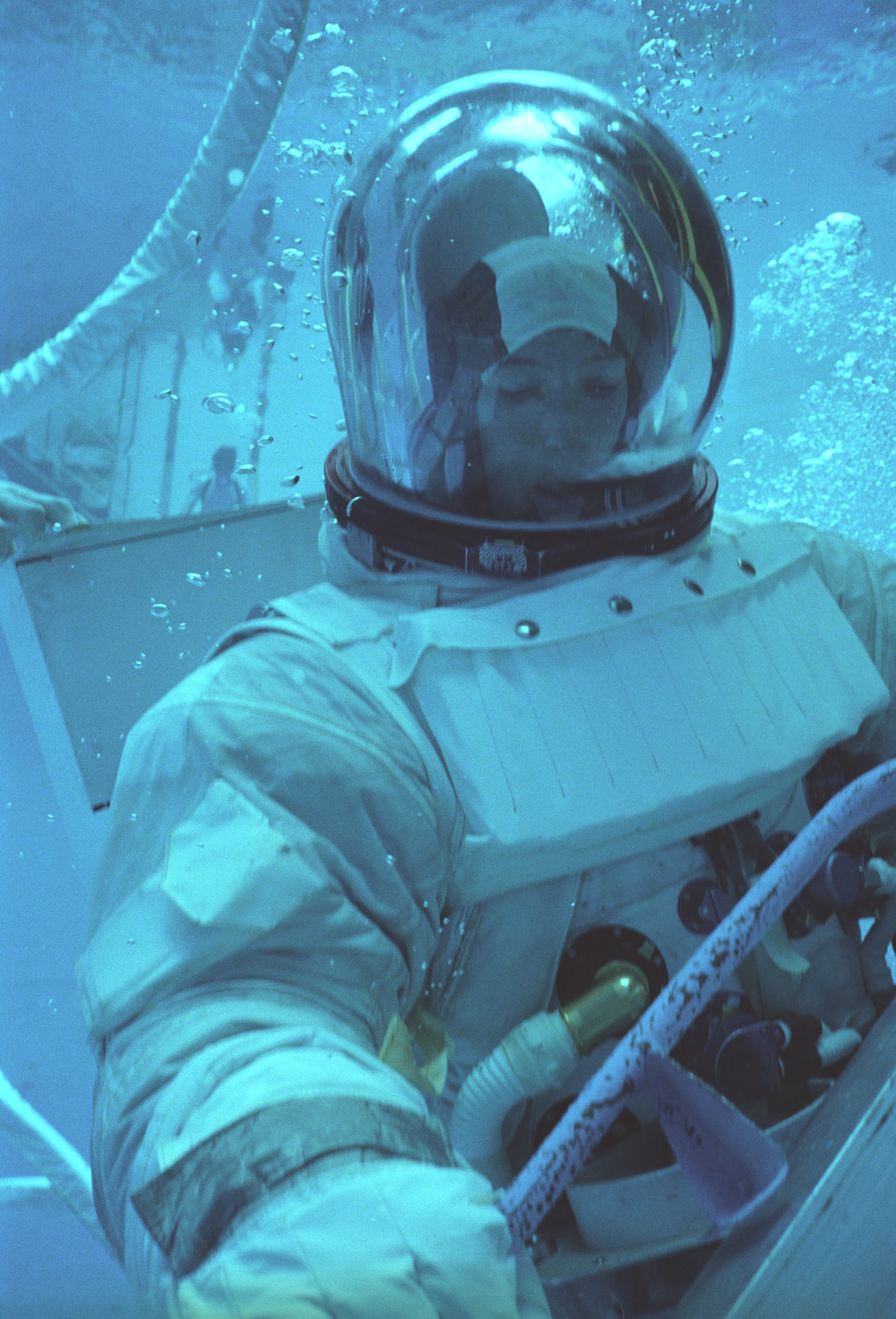
Training on a mock-up of a modular section of the Hubble Space Telescope

Astronaut candidate training included learning to fly NASA's T-38 Talon jet aircraft. Mission specialist astronaut candidates like Fisher did not have to qualify as pilots, only ride in the back seat and handle an emergency if the pilot became incapacitated. Fellow TFNGs James Buchli and Dale Gardner, who were naval flight officers, drew up a training syllabus for mission specialist astronaut candidates like Fisher who had no aviation experience. Each was assigned to a pilot astronaut or astronaut candidate as an instructor; Fisher's was astronaut Ken Mattingly. The instructors took pride in the progress of their trainees, and attempted to convey some of their own love of flying. Fisher took private flying lessons, and soloed for the first time in November 1978. On one weekend day each month, she worked in the emergency room at Houston Methodist Clear Lake Hospital or Tampa General Hospital in Florida to keep her medical skills well-honed. To keep in shape she would do a 4-mile (6.4 km) run each day, lifted weights in the gym, and played racquetball.

On August 31, 1979, Fisher completed her training and evaluation period, making her eligible for assignment as a mission specialist on Space Shuttle flight crews, had there been any. NASA had already, on August 1, issued a call for another intake of astronaut candidates. Bill applied again. He had earned a Master of Science degree in engineering from the University of Houston and taken flying lessons to make himself more attractive to the program. This time he was accepted, and became part of NASA Astronaut Group 9. This made them the first married couple to be selected for astronaut training. (Note: Russian cosmonauts Valentina Tereshkova and Andriyan Nikolayev married in 1963 after both had flown in space.) She attended meetings of the astronaut spouses' club so the wives of her fellow astronauts would not feel threatened by her working closely with their husbands.

Following the one-year basic training program, Fisher was assigned to assist in the design of spacesuits tailored to fit women (called the extra-small Extravehicular Mobility Unit or EMU). In particular, she assisted with the design of an extra-small Hard Upper Torso (HUT). She was given Pete Conrad's old space suit worn on the Apollo 12 and Skylab 2 missions. Conrad was one of the shortest Apollo astronauts, but the suit was still too large. Fisher made do, and wore the suit when she carried out various activities in a water tank to test tools and procedures for extravehicular activity (EVA). Ultimately, NASA decided that the cost and complexity of designing and producing a small space suit was prohibitive, and that it was simpler and cheaper to limit EVAs to astronauts that fit medium- and large-sized suits, rather than adapt the suits to fit small-sized astronauts. Fisher then worked with William B. Lenoir on the development of techniques for repairing the Space Shuttle tiles. She was the Astronaut Office representative for the development and testing of the Canadarm remote manipulator system and the testing of payload bay door contingency spacewalk procedures.

For STS-1, the inaugural orbital spaceflight of the Space Shuttle program and the maiden flight of the Space Shuttle Columbia, Abbey decided that the five MDs of the 1978 and 1980 astronaut selections—Fisher, Seddon and Norman Thagard from the 1978 group, and Bill Fisher and Jim Bagian from the 1980 group—would be assigned to the search and rescue helicopters supporting the flight. These would be required if the Space Shuttle crashed or the astronauts had to eject. Fisher was based at the White Sands Test Facility, an alternative landing site. She performed this duty again at Edwards Air Force Base for STS-2, at White Sands again for STS-3 and at the Kennedy Space Center (KSC) for STS-4. For these four missions, Fisher was involved in the verification of flight software at the Shuttle Avionics Integration Laboratory (SAIL). In that capacity, she reviewed test requirements and procedures for ascent, in-orbit, and Canadarm (RMS) software verification. Fisher was a "Cape Crusader"—one of the astronauts who supported vehicle integrated testing and payload testing at KSC—for the STS-5 and STS-6 missions, and the lead Cape Crusader for the June 1983 STS-7 mission.

=== STS-51-A ===
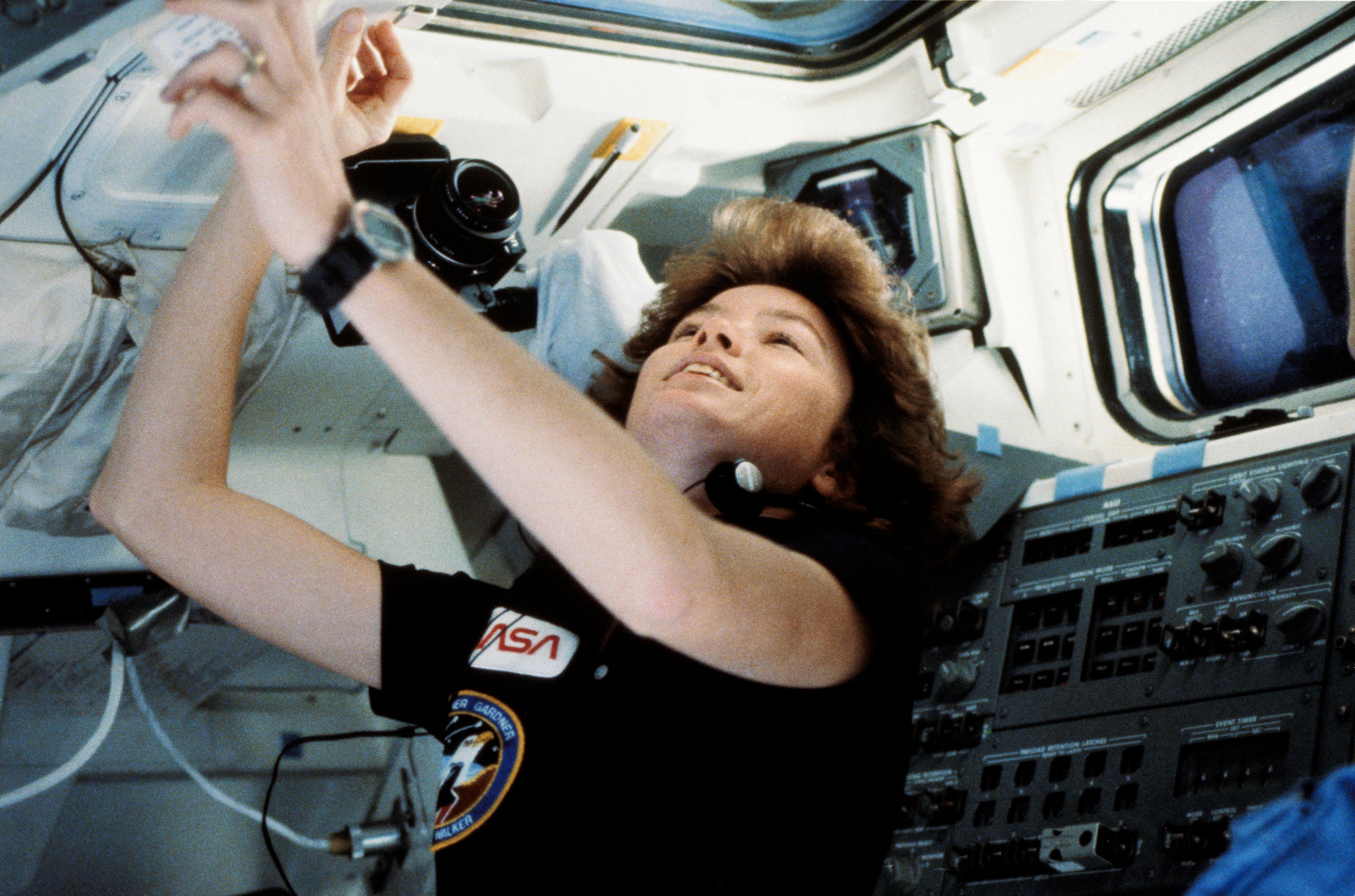
Near the aft flight deck of the Space Shuttle Discovery on the STS-51-A mission

Fisher became pregnant in late 1982 while working as a Cape Crusader. She wanted to have children, and there was no certainty as to when she would be assigned to a space flight. She continued to fly to KSC in NASA T-38 jets until she informed Abbey when she was four-and-a-half-months pregnant, and he directed that henceforth she would have to fly on commercial jets, which she found very inconvenient. Four months later, Abbey summoned Fisher and her husband Bill to his office, and informed them that he was assigning her to a flight. This would make her the first mother to fly in space. She gave birth to her daughter, Kristin Anne, on Friday, July 29, 1983, and was back at work at JSC on the following Monday.

The public announcement of the selection of Fisher and the other members of the crew of the STS-41-G mission was made on September 21, 1983. The crew was commanded by Hauck, who had piloted the STS-7 mission, and also included David M. Walker as the pilot, Fisher as the flight engineer (MS2), and fellow mission specialists Gardner and Joseph P. Allen. STS-41-G was tentatively scheduled for August 1, 1984.

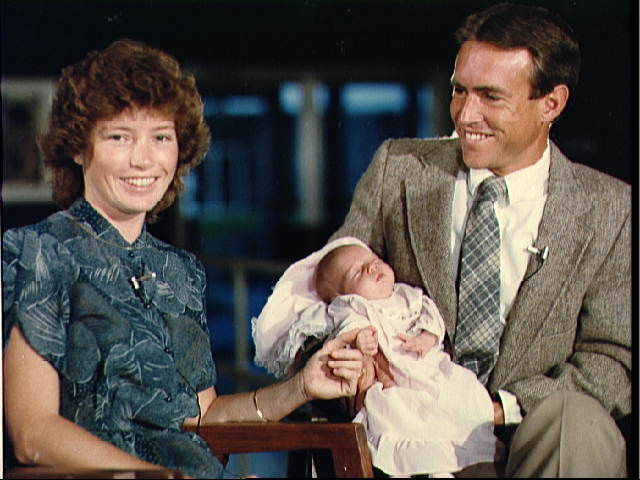
Anna and Bill Fisher and baby daughter Kristin Anne

As the flight engineer, Fisher sat in the seat behind the commander and the pilot and assisted them during ascent, descent and landing. Before her flight, Fisher wanted to perform capsule communicator (CAPCOM) duties. Hauck was unenthusiastic about this—he wanted his crew to be focused on training for the upcoming mission—but he relented, and Fisher performed CAPCOM duties for STS-9 in November. She used a breast pump during breaks and hired a nanny to help care for Kristin. The crew went to Seattle to learn about the Inertial Upper Stage (IUS) from the manufacturer, Boeing, but on the way back they found that the mission payload had been changed and the IUS would not be used. By November the crew was assigned to the STS-41-H mission.

Being in line to become the first mother to fly in space brought Fisher additional fame. In February 1984 she went to New York City to appear on the Today show. While there she heard that the STS-41-B mission had launched two Hughes HS-376 satellites. After the Payload Assist Module (PAM) of the first failed, leaving it in an unusable orbit, they had launched the second one, and its PAM had failed too. Asked specifically whether NASA would attempt to retrieve the two satellites, Fisher replied categorically that it would not. The HS-376 was the size of a small bus, with solar arrays and an apogee kick motor. It was not designed to be retrieved, so there was nothing for the Canadarm to grab on to, and NASA had never done anything like it before.

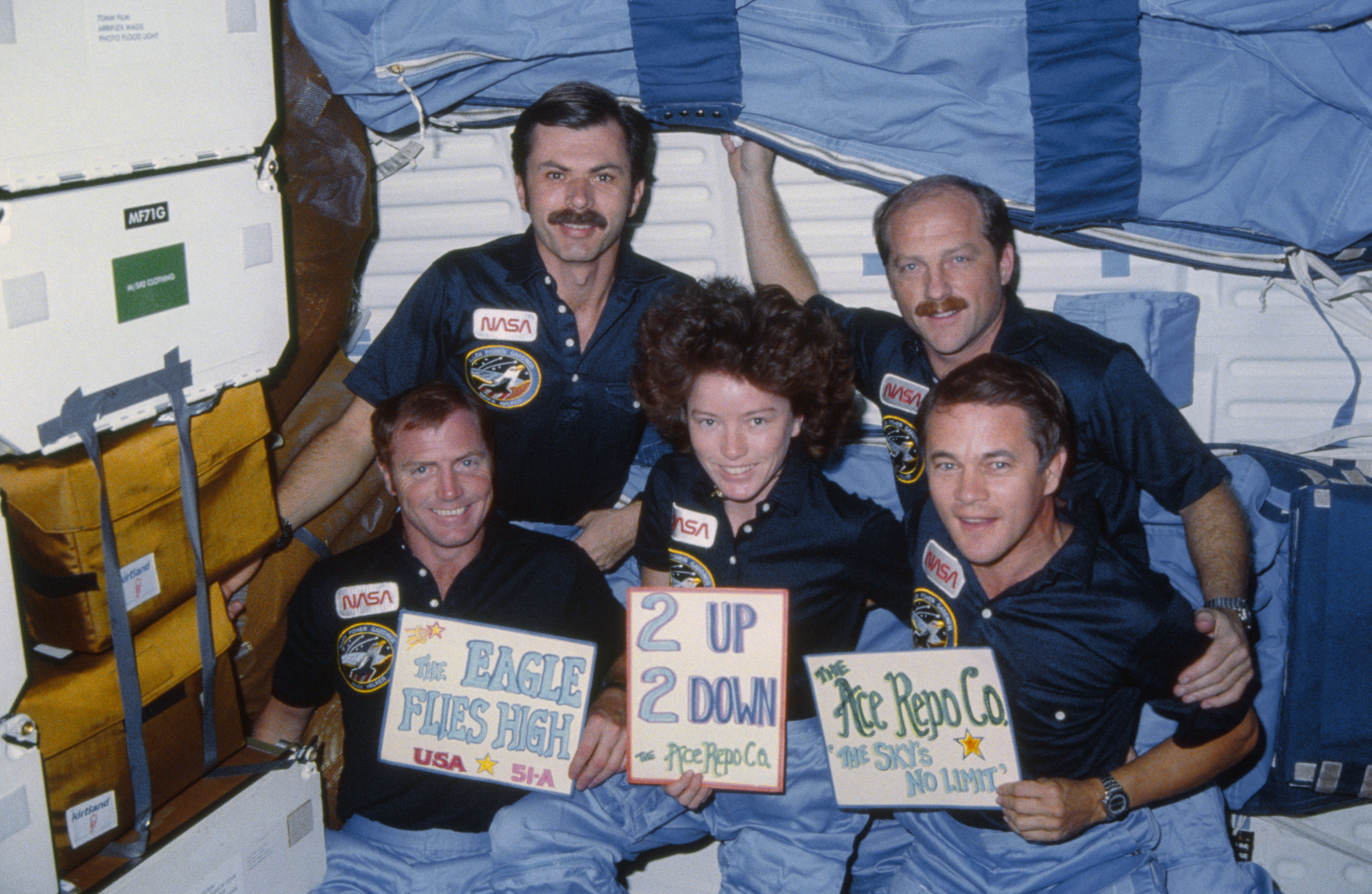
Crew portrait during the STS-51-A mission

The insurance companies—Lloyd's of London and the International Underwriting Association—convinced NASA to make an attempt to retrieve the two satellites. Hauck's crew was reassigned to this mission, which was designated STS-51-A. The mission would be the fourteenth Space Shuttle flight, and NASA was eager to demonstrate its capability. The crew was enthusiastic about the mission but Hauck was much less so. He thought the mission was dangerous and declared that it would be remarkable if they could retrieve one satellite, and a miracle if they could retrieve two.

The method that the NASA engineers and astronauts came up with was to capture the satellites with a device they called an Apogee Kick Motor Capture Device or "stinger". Allen would use the Manned Maneuvering Unit (MMU) to fly over to the satellite and place the stinger inside its rocket nozzle. It would open like an umbrella, and take hold of the satellite. On the other end was a grapple fixture. Fisher would use the Canadarm to grab hold of the fixture and maneuver the satellite into the cargo bay of the Space Shuttle Discovery. Allen and Gardner would then have to secure the satellite inside the cargo bay. Since the other two mission specialists were preoccupied with the EVAs, Fisher would also assist Hauck and Walker as the mission's flight engineer.

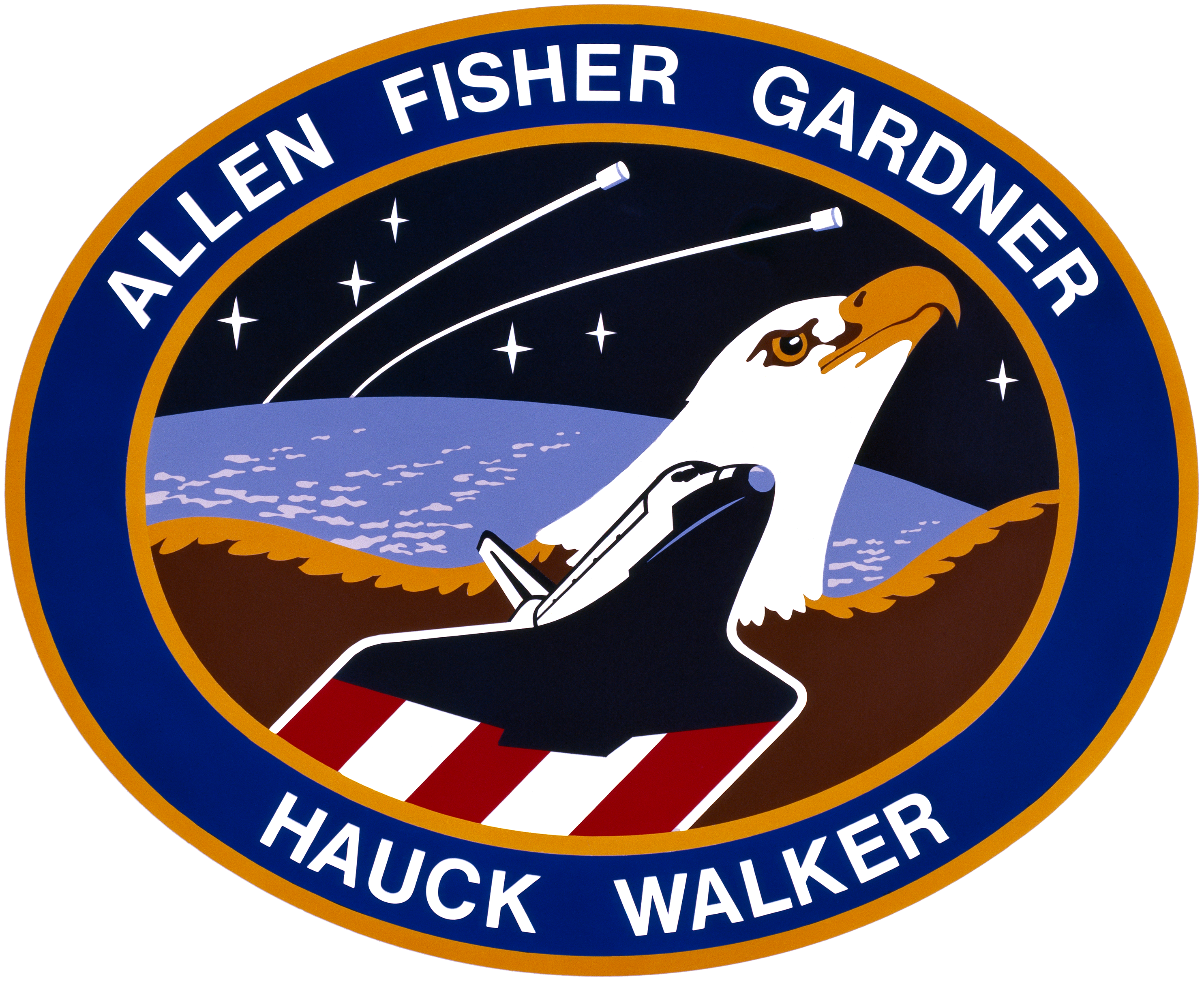
Fisher's mission patch design for STS-51-A had six stars: five for the crew and one representing her daughter Kristin.

Fisher was asked to design the insignia for this mission. Her design had six stars: five for the crew and one representing Kristin. Reporters asked her how she felt about leaving her child behind. She pointed out that men on her flight were also leaving their children behind; Gardner had a son a few months older than Kristin, and all the others had older children. In the weeks and months leading up to the flight, she recorded a series of videos for Kristin so her daughter would know what her mother was like in case she did not come back. STS-51-A was supposed to launch on November 7 but high winds in the upper atmosphere forced a 24-hour postponement.

Discovery lifted off from Launch Pad 39A at KSC on November 8, 1984, on its second mission. Once Discovery was in orbit, Fisher performed the checkout of the RMS. Like many astronauts, she felt the effects of space adaptation syndrome and did not feel better until the third day. On the second day the crew deployed Telesat Canada's 1,237-kilogram (2,727 lb) Anik D2, an HS 376 communications satellite, using a spring-ejection mechanism. This was the first time that a Space Shuttle deployed a satellite at night. The following day they deployed the U.S. Navy's Leasat 1 satellite using the Frisbee-style mechanism that had been used to deploy Leasat 2 successfully on the STS-41-D mission.

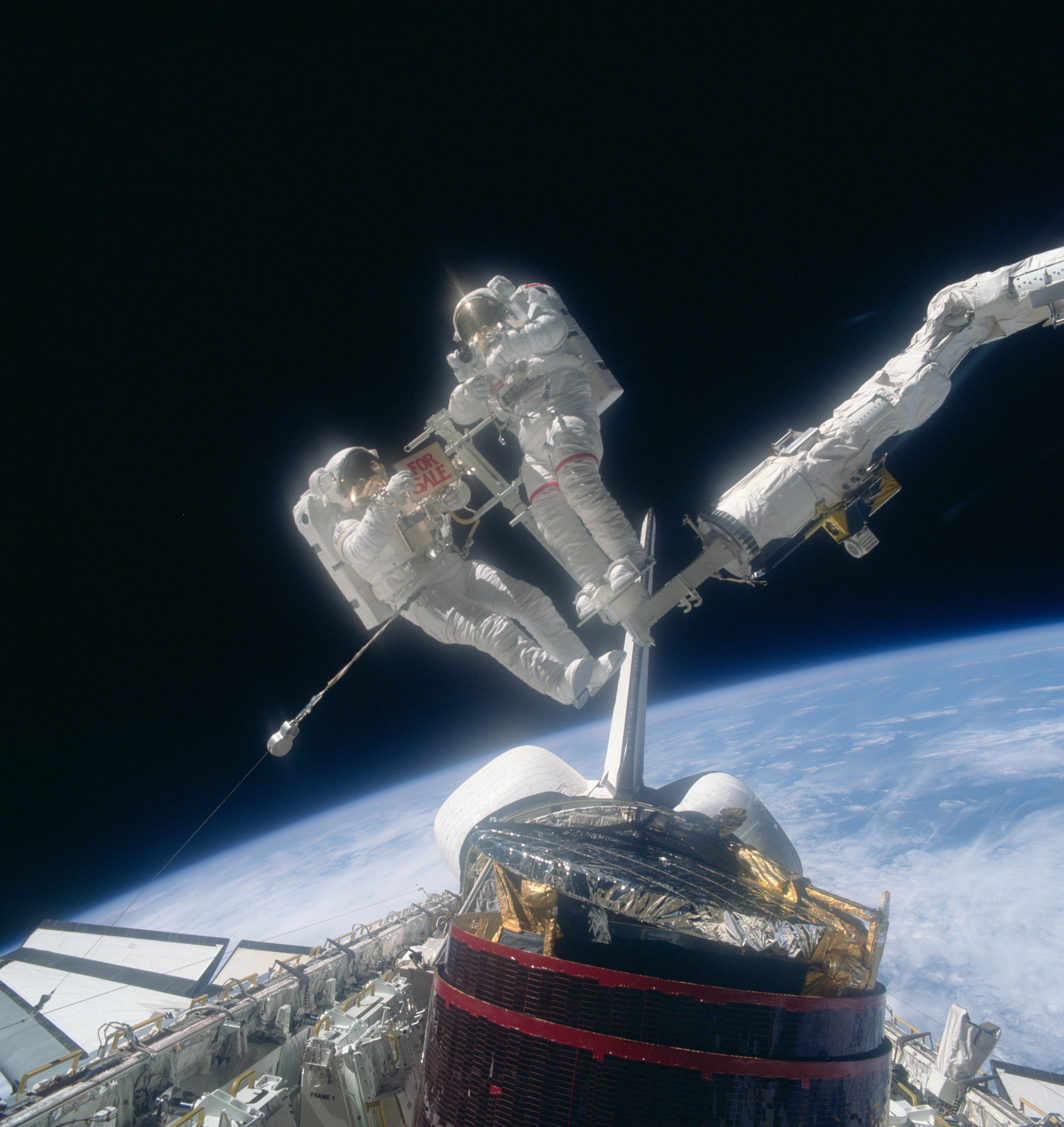
Dale Gardner (left) and Joseph P. Allen (right) atop the Canadarm operated by Fisher after recapture of Westar VI

On the fifth day of the mission, Discovery rendezvoused with Palapa B2, the first of the two satellites to be recovered. In the weeks leading up to the mission the satellites' onboard motors had been used to lower their orbit and reduce their spin rate to make it easier for the astronauts to retrieve them. Allen was able to fly out to the satellite using the MMU and grab hold of it. He deployed the stinger, and Fisher grappled it with the Canadarm. But when Gardner went to attach the large clamp, it did not fit; the satellite had not been built exactly according to its specifications.

Out of communication with mission control, the crew then came up with another plan. Fisher released the grapple and Allen stood on the footholds on the Canadarm. Fisher maneuvered it so Allen could manhandle the satellite, and Gardner attached the docking clamp to the bottom. The satellite was then successfully retrieved. The next day they repeated the procedure and retrieved the second satellite, the Westar VI. The crew also operated a Radiation Monitoring Equipment (RME) device and the 3M Company's Diffusive Mixing of Organic Solutions (DMOS) experiment. Discovery touched down at KSC on November 16, 1984, after a flight lasting 7 days, 23 hours and 45 minutes, during which it had completed 127 orbits.

Lloyd's of London awarded the crew its silver medal for those who "by extraordinary exertions have contributed to the preservation of property from perils of all kind." It had only been awarded five times since World War II, and this was the first time it had been awarded for a salvage operation that was not at sea. The medals were presented by President Ronald Reagan. Fisher was named "national mother of the year" by the Father's Day/Mother's Day Council, along with Martha Layne Collins, Clara Hale, Louisa Kennedy, Susan Lucci, Sarah Palfrey, Madge Sinclair and Frederica Von Stade.

=== Post-Challenger ===
In December 1984, Fisher was assigned to mission STS-61-C, a satellite deployment mission. The mission was scheduled for December 1985 on Columbia and would deploy the Westar 7 communications satellite for Western Union and the Satcom KU-2 communications satellite for RCA. It was commanded by Michael L. Coats. This time John E. Blaha was the pilot and Thagard and Robert C. Springer were fellow mission specialist. Fisher would reprise her role of flight engineer. The launch date slipped and the crew was reassigned to mission STS-61-H, which was scheduled to fly, with a different payload, in June 1986. That mission was canceled in the wake of the Space Shuttle Challenger disaster in January 1986.

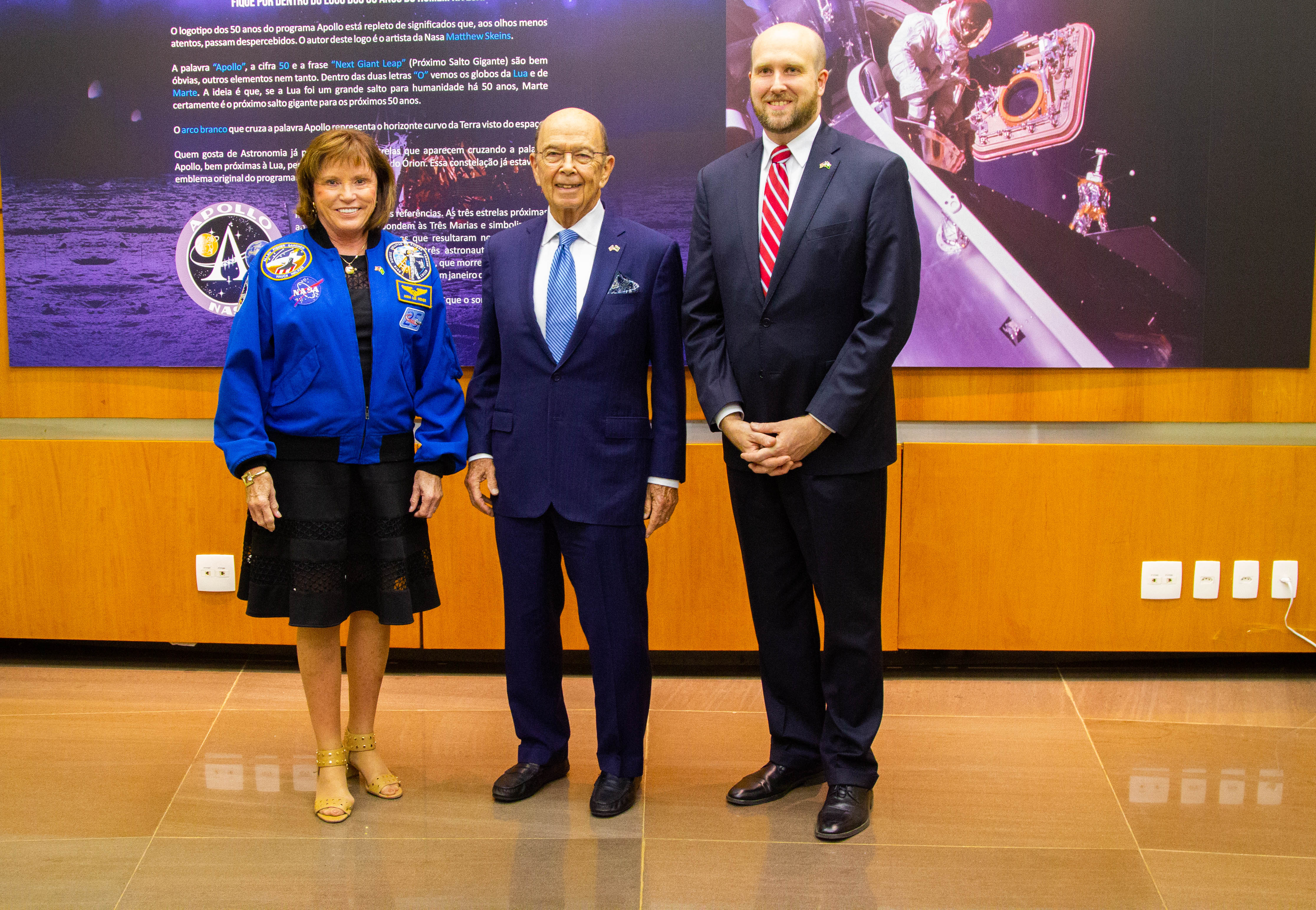
With U.S. Secretary of Commerce Wilbur Ross (center) and Chargé d'Affaires in Brasilia William W. Popp in 2019

Following the disaster, Fisher worked as the Deputy of the Mission Development Branch of the Astronaut Office, and as the astronaut office representative for Flight Data File issues. In that capacity, she served as the crew representative on the Crew Procedures Change Board. She served on the Astronaut Selection Board for NASA Astronaut Group 12 in 1987, and in the Space Station Support Office, where she worked part-time in the Space Station Operations Branch. In this role she was the crew representative supporting space station development in the areas of training, operations concepts, and the health maintenance facility.

During an appearance at UCLA, Fisher mentioned that she had completed all the coursework required for a master's degree in chemistry, but students on the PhD track usually bypass their masters. Staff at UCLA checked their records, and Fisher was awarded her Master of Science degree in chemistry in 1987. She was initiated as an alumna into the Pi Beta Phi fraternity for Women in 1989, at the San Diego biennial Convention.

=== Leave of absence ===
A second daughter, Kara Lynne, was born in 1989. Kara had the rare distinction of being born after both parents had flown in space. From 1989 to 1995, Fisher took an extended leave from NASA to raise her family. There was no intention to take multiple years off; she took a year at a time. The Fishers divorced in 2000.

=== Return ===
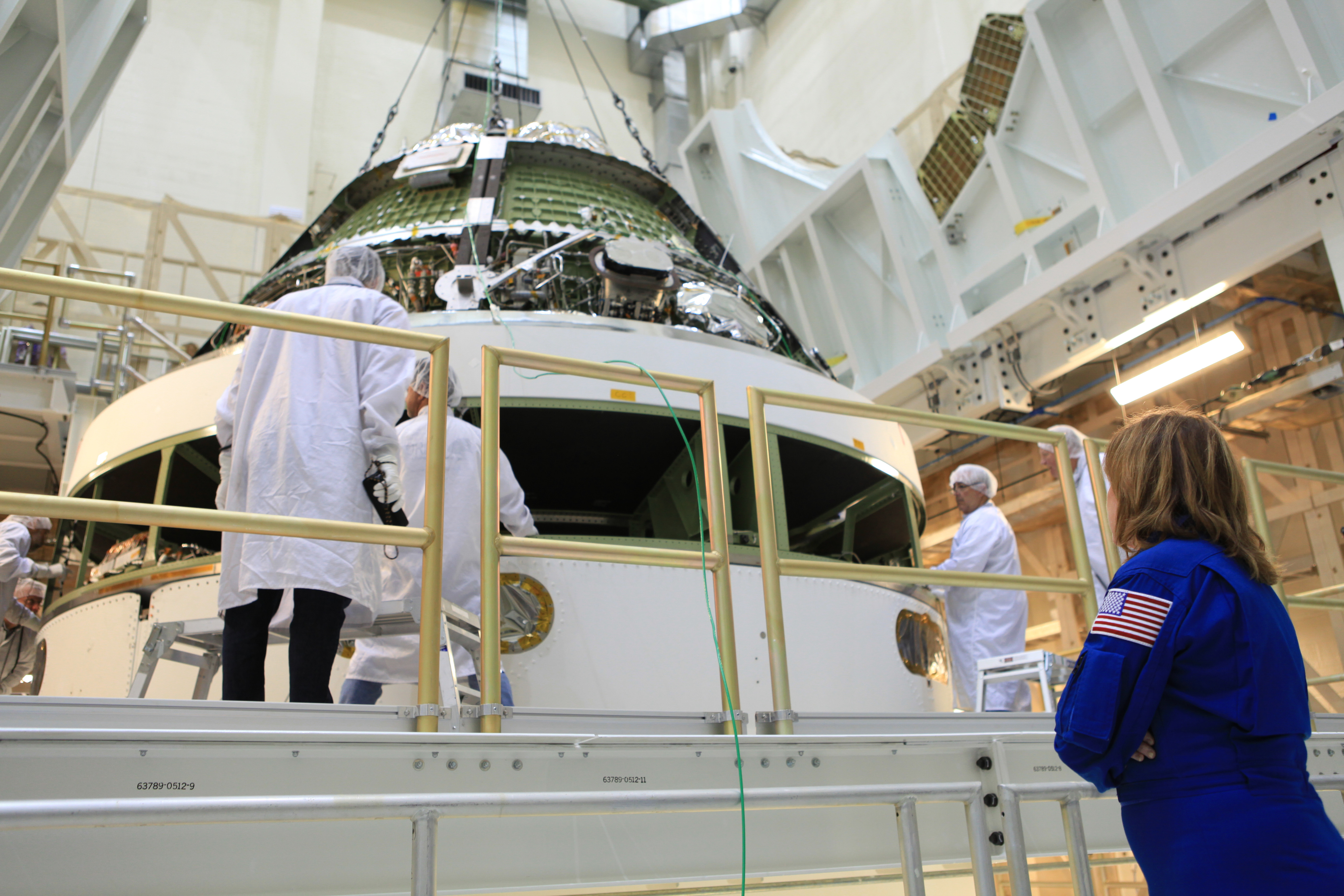
Visiting the Operations and Checkout building where the Orion spacecraft for the Exploration Flight Test-1 mission is being prepared

When Fisher returned to the Astronaut Office in 1995, she was assigned to the Operations Planning Branch to work on the procedures and training issues in support of the International Space Station (ISS). She was chief of the Operations Planning Branch from June 1997 to June 1998, and deputy chief for operations training in the Space Station Branch from June 1998 to June 1999. In these roles, she oversaw Astronaut Office inputs to the space station program regarding operations, procedures and training. She then served as chief of the Space Station Branch. In that capacity, she was involved in issues regarding the design, development, and testing of the ISS hardware.

Fisher also served as the Astronaut Office representative on numerous Space Station Program Boards and Multilateral Boards. She was later assigned to the Shuttle Branch and worked on technical assignments within that branch. In 2012, she briefly made news when, during the landing of Discovery at Washington's Dulles Airport, where it was being retired to the Smithsonian Institution, she advised an aspiring astronaut to study Russian. At least one commentator suggested this was a veiled criticism of the US government's lack of funding for the space program.

Fisher was a CAPCOM from January 2011 to August 2013, and was the lead CAPCOM for ISS Expedition 33. As a management astronaut, she was involved in the development of the flight instruments display for the Orion project until her retirement in April 2017.

== Public appearances ==
Before and after her flight assignments Fisher performed many public appearances per year; those included both official duties, such as when she spoke to visitors at the September 22, 2012, open house of NASA's Langley Research Center, and semi-official duties, such as when she was a special guest at the 99th Indianapolis 500 on May 24, 2015. Fisher and Bill appeared together with their daughter Kristin on an August 1983 segment of Good Morning America. The September 1982 issue of The Saturday Evening Post featured a cover photo of Fisher. She was also photographed for the back cover of Redbook magazine. On June 14, 2018, Fisher christened the Viking Orion cruise ship, named after the constellation Orion and in recognition of NASA's Orion spacecraft, in which she was extensively involved.

== In popular culture ==
Iconic image of Fisher

Other than the publicity she does herself, her likeness has been widely shared on the internet and it has been used in various promotions and tribute art. Photographer John Bryson shot a series of photos of Fisher wearing a helmet and space suit. One shot in the series, in which she is turned farthest away from the camera (almost in complete profile), has frequently been shared. The image has since been used to promote the bands MGMT, Incubus, Arctic Monkeys, Max and Harvey, and The Moth & The Flame.

When the photo was taken (Note: The date the photo was taken has yet to be corroborated. The photographer, John Bryson, died in 2005. Fisher, and her then husband Bill, were photographed at Johnson Space Center in November 1977 when they were both civilians; Bryson is credited as their photographer. There are at least three photos of Fisher in a space helmet that have been credited to Bryson. In two photos she is in almost complete profile (the main difference is her entire left eye can be seen in one and not the other). In the third, she is looking into the camera. The photo of her in near complete profile is the viral shot. In 2011 Bryson's son Scott - who commemorates his dad's work online - posted that he could not verify the provenance of the popular photo. The only publicly available archive of Bryson's work is at The Briscoe Center for American History at The University of Texas. The guide to the archive, posted online in 2015, has no mention of Fisher, NASA, or visits to Houston. A different photo in NASA's archives, showing Fisher at a NASA publicity event in Houston, is dated January 31, 1978.) and published is unknown. (Note: Thomas Haller Buchanan posted the photo to Blogger on April 16, 2009,. This is the earliest known posting of the image. Buchanan and many subsequent commenters claimed that the image was in (or alternately on the cover of) the May 1985 issue of Life magazine. John Bryson's son, Scott, contacted Time/Life and they rejected those claims. Scott Bryson has speculated elsewhere that the original negative may have been lost by Sygma or lost when "near riots broke out in the Paris office". Sygma has been sued by photographers in the past for losing images.)

== Awards and honors ==
- National Science Foundation Undergraduate Research Fellowship (1970, 1971)
- NASA Space Flight Medal (1984)
- NASA Exceptional Service Medal (1988, 1998)
- Lloyd's of London Silver Medal for Meritorious Salvage Operations (1985)
- Mother of the Year Award (1985)
- UCLA Professional Achievement Award (1986)
- UCLA Chemistry and Biochemistry Alumni Award (2012)
