= William Frederick Fisher =

American astronaut (born 1946)

William Fisher
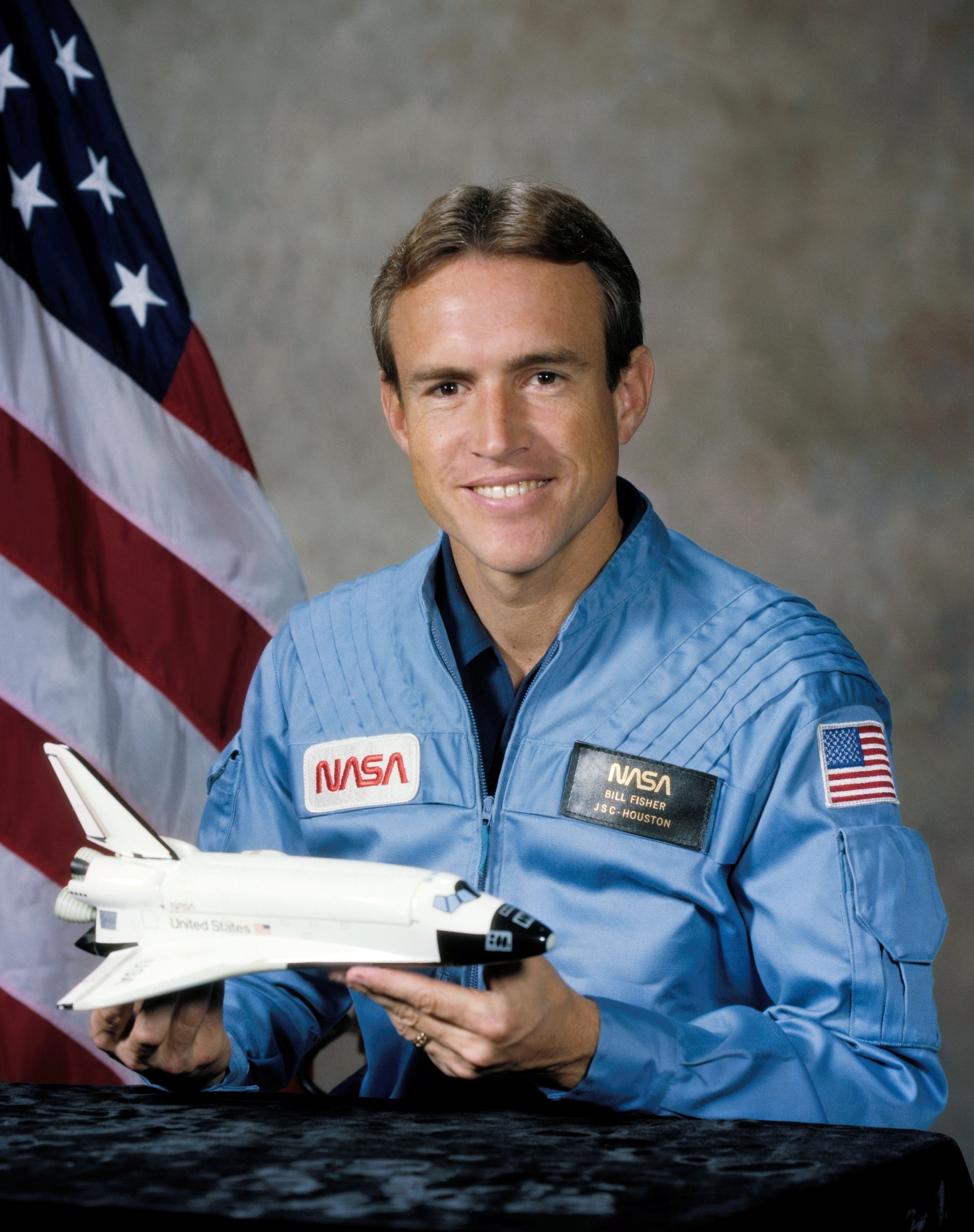
- Fisher in 1981
- Born: William Frederick Fisher; April 1, 1946 (age 80); Dallas, Texas, U.S.
- Education: Stanford University (BS); University of Florida (MD); University of Houston
- Spouse: Anna Lee Fisher (m. 1977; div. 2000) Maureen Fuhrmann 2025-Present
- Children: 2, including Kristin Fisher
- Space career

NASA astronaut
- Time in space: 7d 2h 17m
- Selection: NASA Group 9 (1980)
- Total EVAs: 2
- Total EVA time: 11h, 46m
- Missions: STS-51-I
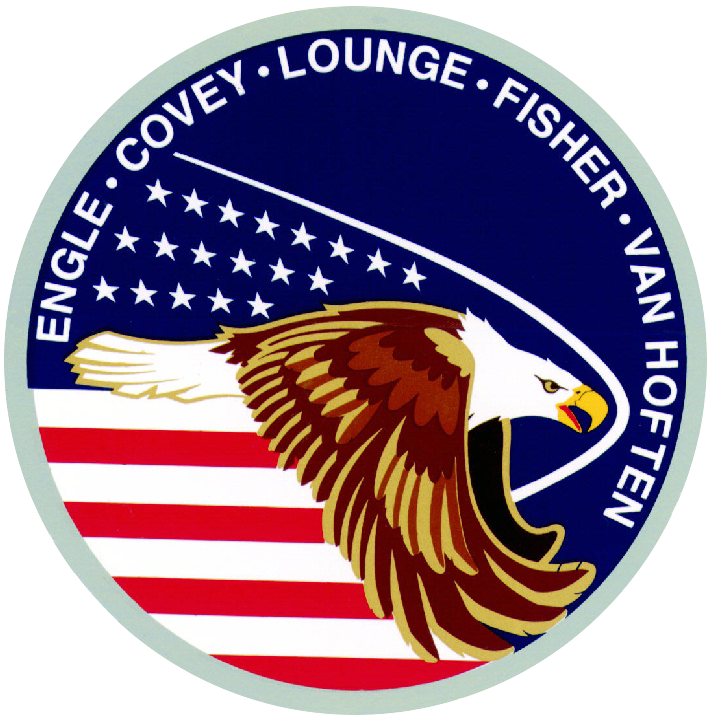
- Mission insignia

William Frederick Fisher (born April 1, 1946) is an American physician and a former NASA astronaut. Fisher went into space in 1985 on board the Space Shuttle. He retired from NASA in 1992 and returned to the full-time practice of medicine. His time at NASA coincided with that of his then wife and fellow astronaut Anna Lee Fisher.

== Early life and career ==
Fisher was born on April 1, 1946, in Dallas, Texas. He graduated from North Syracuse Central High School in North Syracuse, New York in 1964.

Fisher graduated from Stanford University in 1968 with a Bachelor of Arts degree in Biological Sciences, and later served as a mountaineering instructor in Leysin, Switzerland. He attended medical school at the University of Florida, where he performed graduate work in microbiology, and graduated with a Doctor of Medicine in 1975. After medical school, Fisher completed a surgical residency in general surgery from 1975 to 1977 at Harbor–UCLA Medical Center in Torrance, California. He entered private practice in emergency medicine in 1977. He also studied toward a graduate degree in engineering at the University of Houston from 1978 to 1980.

== NASA career ==
Fisher was selected as a NASA astronaut in 1980. He has logged over 2,000 hours in prop, rotary-wing, jet aircraft and spacecraft. His technical assignments included: scientific equipment operator for high altitude research on the WB-57F aircraft (1980–1981); astronaut medical support for the first four Shuttle missions (1980–1982); astronaut office representative for Extravehicular Mobility Unit (spacesuit) and Extravehicular Activity (EVA) procedures and development, including thermal vacuum testing of the suit (1981–1984); astronaut office representative for the Payload Assist Module (PAM-D) procedures and development (1982–1983); Astronaut office representative for Shuttle Mission Simulator (SMS) development (1983); support crewman for STS-8; CAPCOM for STS-8 and STS-9; Remote Manipulator System (RMS) hardware and software development team (1983); Manned Maneuvering Unit (MMU) development team (1983); Deputy Director of NASA Government-furnished and Contractor-furnished Equipment (1982–1983); Chief of Astronaut Public Appearances (1985–1987); Member of the U.S. Air Force Scientific Advisory Board (1986–1991); NASA Medicine Policy Board (1987–1991); Astronaut Office Space Station Manned Systems Division, and Health Maintenance Facility (1987–1989); Astronaut Office representative on space crew selection and retention standards for Space Station (1989–1991). Fisher also continued to practice Emergency Medicine in the greater Houston area in conjunction with his astronaut duties.

Fisher was a mission specialist on STS-51-I, which launched from Kennedy Space Center, Florida, on August 27, 1985. STS-51-I was acknowledged as the most successful Space Shuttle mission yet flown. The crew aboard Space Shuttle Discovery deployed three communications satellites, the Navy SYNCOM IV-4, the Australian AUSSAT, and American Satellite Company's ASC-1. They also performed a successful on-orbit rendezvous with the ailing 15,400 pound SYNCOM IV-3 satellite, and two EVAs (spacewalks) by Fisher and James van Hoften to repair it, including the longest spacewalk in history (at that time). Discovery completed 112 orbits of the Earth before landing at Edwards Air Force Base, California, on September 3, 1985. Fisher logged over 170 hours in space, including 11 hours and 52 minutes of Extravehicular Activity (EVA).

In 1990, Fisher led a study of the design of the planned space station, Freedom, which would eventually become the International Space Station. The New York Times reported that study "found the 500-foot structure was so complex and fragile that it could need up to 3,700 hours of maintenance a year by space-suited astronauts, as against the designers' original goal of 130 hours." In March of that year Fisher gained political notice "when he publicly accused his superiors at the space agency of ignoring the maintenance problem. Subsequently, he was called to Capitol Hill to testify before a number of committees."

== Post-NASA ==
After leaving NASA, Fisher returned to the practice of emergency medicine. He remains in active medical practice in the greater Houston area at the present time.

== Personal life ==
He married fellow physician and later fellow astronaut, Anna Lee Fisher of St. Albans, New York, on August 23, 1977. They have two daughters, one of whom is CNN journalist Kristin Fisher. The two divorced in 2000.Dr. Fisher and Maureen Fuhrmann were married on May 24, 2025.

== Organizations ==
- Diplomate of the American Board of Emergency Medicine
- Fellow of the American College of Emergency Physicians
- Fellow of the American Academy of Emergency Medicine

== Awards and honors ==
- American Astronautical Society Victor A. Prather Award for Outstanding Achievement in the field of Extravehicular Activity (1985)
- Federation Aeronautique Internationale V.M. Komarov Diploma for Outstanding Achievement in the Field of Exploration of Outer Space(Awarded to the STS-51 Crew) (1985)
- NASA Space Flight Medal (1985)
- NASA Exceptional Service Medal (1988)
- Group Achievement Awards for EMU (Extravehicular Mobility Unit or "Space Suit") and MMU (Manned Maneuvering Unit) Development (1983, 1984)
- Group Achievement Awards for Payload Assist Module (PAM) Software Development and Vehicle Integration (1983)
- Named an ad hoc member of the U.S. Air Force Scientific Advisory Board (1986–1991)
- Appointed a member of the NASA Medicine Policy Board (1987–1991)
