= Caroline Gaudriault =

French journalist and author

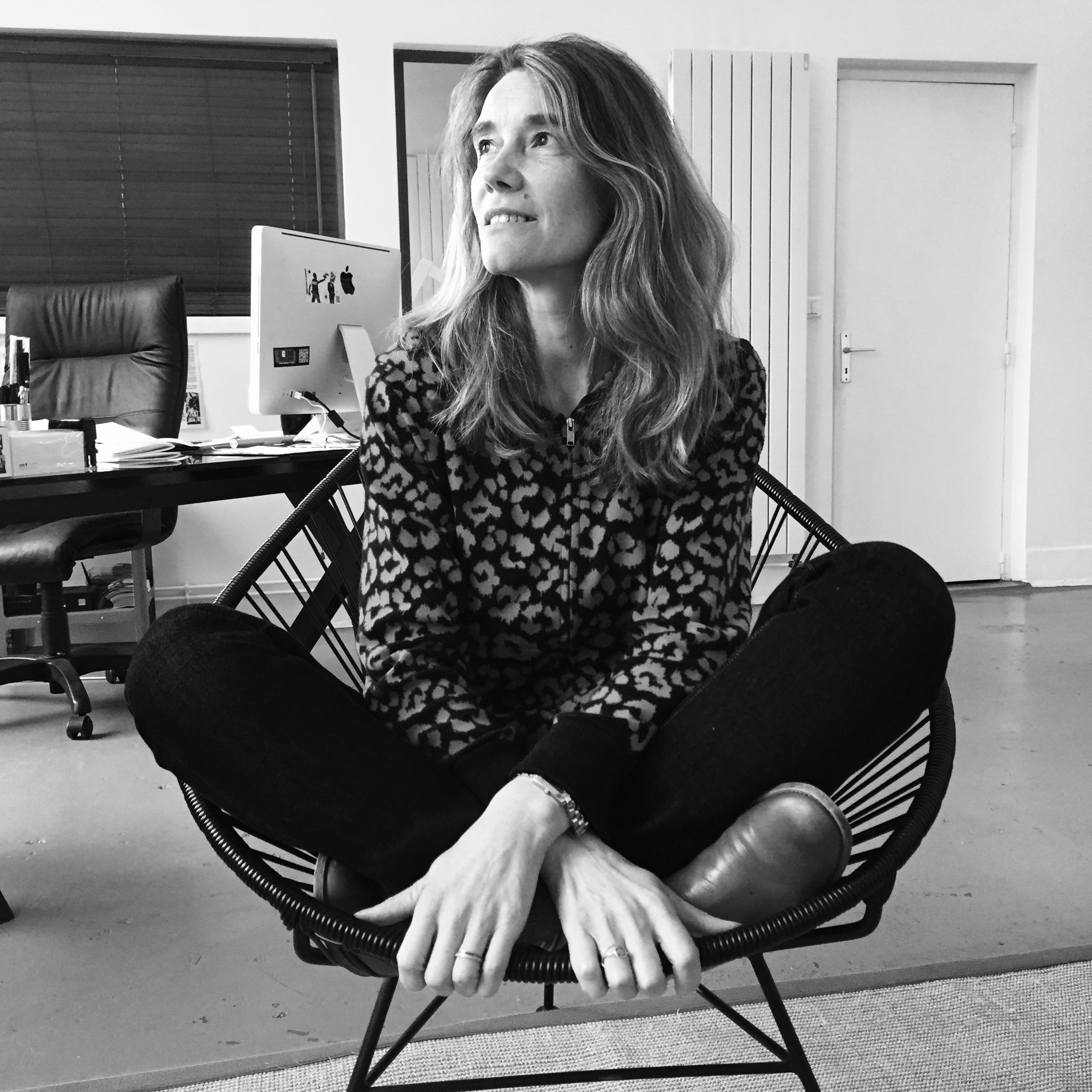
Caroline Gaudriault

Caroline Gaudriault (born in Paris) is a French author. She has also created art installations for museums based on her literary texts. Over the last 20 years she has worked closely with French photographer Gérard Rancinan.

== Biography ==
Caroline Gaudriault is a French author of artistic works and essays, translated into several languages. She creates works that give shape to her personal writing, both poetic and political. Her work puts in perspective a thought which implies an artistic approach.

== Work ==
Her philosophical texts and essays inspire Rancinan's photographs. Her editorial works and his photographs influence each other reciprocally and, as an artistic couple, they exhibit their works together. Gaudriault generally curates the exhibitions and is in charge of the editorial outlines. She has created calligraphy installations to give form to her texts.

One early collaboration project with Rancinan was a historical review of the survivors of the bombing of Hiroshima in 1945. The project Paroles d'hibakusha presents the survivors, the so called hibakusha, and gives them a voice through interviews.

A crucial project in her work is the book A Small Man in a Big World, published in 2014 and later translated into English and Chinese. She conducted an interview with American political scientist and senior fellow professor at Stanford University, Francis Fukuyama. Their thoughts about political systems, relationship with modernity, cultural heritage, and social contradictions became central points of the interview.

== Books ==
- Le Déluge , livre plasticien de Caroline Gaudriault, reliure à la main, 2024
- Voyage Immoblile, Paradox, 2021
- Soulages, les reflets, Paradox édition, (on the painter Pierre Soulages), 2019
- A democratic murder, Paradox édition, 2019
- Another day on Earth, Paradox, 2015
- A Small Man in a Big World, Editions Paradox, 2014 - conversation with Francis Fukuyama
- Wonderful World, Trilogy of the Moderns Part III, Editions Paradox, 2012
- Hypothèses, Trilogy of the Moderns Part II, Edition Paradox, 2011
- Métamorphoses, conversations & natures mortes, Trilogy of the Moderns Part I, Biro & Cohen editors, 2009
- The Photographer, Edition Abrams, New York, 2008
- Le Temps des rencontres, By Us, 2007
- Rancinan Exploit, Edition Federico Motta, Milan, 2004
- Urban Jungle, Edition de La Martinière, 1999

== Art exhibitions ==
- Le Dôme de Lord Norman Foster, chai, St Emilion, France, "L’Absolu, variations" 2023
- Centre d’art Polaris, Istres, France, "Héritage ou l’autre monde" 2023
- La Fondation Le Corbusier, Maison la Roche, Paris "L’Absolu et 45 pièces de fer" 2022
- Le Prieuré de Vivoin, Le Mans, "Le Destin des Hommes" 2022
- Villa Tamaris, La Seyne sur Mer, France, "Voyage en démocratie!" 2022
- Mohammed VI Museum of Modern and Contemporary Art, Rabat, Morocco, «From rage and desire, the human heart beating» 2022
- Foundation Dassault, Paris, France “The motionless journey”, 2021
- Castle St Maur cru classé, domaine de Saint-Tropez, France, 2020
- Danubiana Meulensteen Art Museum, Bratislava, Slovaquie, "DEMOCRATIA", 2019
- Institut Bernard Magrez, Bordeaux, France, "Festins", 2019
- Musée de la Mer, Bordeaux, France, exhibition "Raft of Illusions", 2019
- See + Gallery, Pékin, Chine, « Small Man », 2018
- Chapelle Sainte Anne, La Baule, France, « The Moderns », 2017
- Collégiale Saint-André, Chartres, France, « Destiny of men », 2017
- La Base sous-marine de Bordeaux, France, « The Probability of Miracle », 2016
- Centre d’art Urban Spree, Berlin, Allemagne, «Destiny of men», 2016
- Jardin Rouge de la Fondation Montresso de Marrakech, Morocco, 2016
- L’Académie des Beaux-Arts de Florence, Italie, « Destiny of men», 2016
- Palais des Beaux-Arts de Lille, France, collective exhibition « Joie de vivre », 2016 Commissaire d’exposition : Bruno Girveau
- Couvent des Cordeliers de Paris, France, « Destiny of men», 2015 Curator : Paul Ardenne
- National Portrait Gallery, Londres, Grande-Bretagne, permanent collection « Barry McGuigan », 2015
- Musée Océanographique de Monaco, France, « An other day on earth », 2015
- Musée d’art contemporain Himalayas de Shanghai, Chine, « The Trilogy of the Moderns », 2014
- Centre d’art Sinan Mansions, Shanghai, Chine, « A Small Man in a Big World », 2014
- Musée du Louvre Lens, Lens, France, « Liberty unveiled », 2013-2018
- Quai d’Orsay, Ministère des Affaires Étrangères, Paris, France, «Batman Family », 2013-2015
- Fondation Pinault et la ville de Dinard, France, collective exhibition « Festin de l’Art », 2014 Commissaire d’exposition : Jean-Jacques Aillagon
- Museo Oscar Niemeyer, Curitiba, Brésil, « A Wonderful World », 2014
- Musée d'Art Contemporain (MAC), Lyon, France, collective exhibition « Moto Poétique », 2014 Curator : Paul Ardenne
- Musée des Arts et Métiers, Paris, France, « Fiest of Barbarians », 2013
- Musée d'Art Contemporain Danubiana, Bratislava, Slovaquie, « Trilogy of the Moderns», 2013 Curator : Vincent Polakovic
- Musée d’Art Contemporain - Les Abattoirs, Toulouse, France, exposition collective «L’Histoire est à moi ! », 2012 Curator : Paul Ardenne
- Londonewcastle Project Space, Shoreditch, Londres, Grande-Bretagne, « Wonderful World», 2012 Curator : Ed Bartlett
- Triennale di Milano, Milan, Italie, « Trilogy of the Moderns », 2012 Curator : Claudio De Albertis
- Gemeentemuseum Den Haag, LaHaye, Pays-Bas, collective exhibition « Reflex Miniature Museum », 2011
- Chapelle Saint-Sauveur, Paris/Issy les Moulineaux, France, « Hypothèses », 2011
- Musée des Arts Décoratifs de Prague, Prague, République Tchèque, collective exhibition «Decadence Now », 2010
- Palais de Tokyo, Paris, France, "Métamorphoses", 2009 Curator : Marc-Olivier Wahler
- Palais de Tokyo, Paris, France, "Le Photographe", 2008 Mécène : Baume&Mercier

== Films ==
- The Trip, a short film by Gérard Rancinan and Caroline Gaudriault, 8 minutes, 2020
- The Immortals, a film by Gérard Rancinan and Caroline Gaudriault, 35 minutes, 2019
- The probability of Miracle, a film by Gérard Rancinan and Caroline Gaudriault, 48 minutes, 2015
