= Hassan Jangju =

Iranian volunteer in the Iran–Iraq war (1967–1984)

- Hassan, pictured in 1980
- Born: 1967; Tabriz, Iran
- Died: 1984 (aged 16–17); Majnoon Island, Iraq
- Mother: Jeyran Pourali
- Military career
- Allegiance: Iran
- Branch: Basij
- Service years: 1980–1984
- Unit: 31st Division
- Conflicts: Iran–Iraq War; Operation Fatholmobin; Operation Dawn-4; Operation Kheibar †

Hassan Jangju (Persian: حسن جنگجو; 1967–1984) was an Iranian Basiji during the Iran–Iraq War who became subject to an iconic photograph taken by Alfred Yaghobzadeh in 1980. He was declared missing in action in 1984, and his body was returned to Iran in 2017.

== Shot ==
In the photo, Jangju is crawling through muddy ground of the marshes in south of Iran while he is holding a rifle in ready state. The photograph was widely shared and was published in several media outlets both due to the special style of the soldier and it also attracted a lot of attention since the family name of the boy, "Jangju" meaning Warrior in Persian language was a good fit for the picture. Alfred Yaghobzadeh was working for the Gamma and Associated Press news agencies at the time of capturing the famous photograph. The same photo was used as propaganda for recruiting volunteers by the Iranian authorities during the Iran–Iraq war and afterwards.

== Background ==
Jangju was a volunteer Basiji. He was killed in February 1984 during Operation Kheibar, which was part of the Battle of the Marshes, when Iran sent soldiers back over the Iraqi border, before they too became bogged down north of Basra.

== Funeral and aftermath ==
The remains of his body were discovered and identified in the former Iran-Iraq war zone and sent back to Tabriz after 34 years on 5 September 2017. On 6 September 2017 the coffin of Hassan Jangju, which was draped in the Iranian flag, was borne through the streets by a huge crowd and laid to rest with full military honours. The ceremony for condolences to the Jangju's family was led by Ali Larijani, speaker of the Iranian parliament. A few hours after the funeral, his mother Jeyran Pourali died. Jangju's family described how the mother would lay out his clothes on a chair at the dinner table every evening, resembling his presence at home. One of his sisters explained: "My mother always believed that she had given her child in the service of God, and therefore was calm, but she always looked forward to his return."

== See also ==
- List of solved missing person cases
- Martyrdom in Iran
