= Jean-Pierre Laffont =

French-American photojournalist (born 1935)

- Born: 1935 (age 90–91); Algeria
- Education: School of Arts et Metiers, Vevey, Switzerland
- Occupation: Photojournalist
- Known for: Contributing to major publications such as LIFE, Time, Newsweek and Manchete
- Notable work: Photo essay on child labor
- Spouse(s): Eliane Laffont (1966–present)
- Children: 1
- Awards: The Madeline Ross & World Press Photo Award

Jean-Pierre Laffont (born 1935) is a French-American photojournalist born in Algeria, and based in New York City, USA. He was the founding member of both Gamma USA and Sygma, which then became one of the largest and most influential photography agencies in the world. Sygma was acquired by the Corbis Corporation in 1999.

== Biography ==
Born in Algeria in 1935, Laffont attended high school and college in Morocco, where he graduated in 1955.

In 1959, he received his master's degree in Photography from Europe's prestigious School of Arts et Metiers in Vevey, Switzerland.

In 1960, Laffont graduated from Military Infantry Academy, in Cherchell (Algeria), where he was a Press Officer, and then proceeded to serve in the French Army as a Commanding Officer in the Oran region in the Algeria War throughout April 1962. He then returned to Paris, where, from 1962 to 1964, he began assisting photographers Sam Levin and Choura, renowned for their photographs of celebrities and movie stars. It was in this period of time that Laffont started to work in portraiture and fashion photography, and was hired as special photographer on movie sets for MGM in Rome.

In 1965, he arrived in the United States and began his career as a photojournalist, and worked as a staff photographer for Status Magazine.

In 1966, he married Eliane Lucotte and in 1970 they had a daughter, Stephanie, born in Nice (France), who is now a professional artist living in New York City.

Laffont then became the first Foreign Correspondent for Gamma Press Images, and in 1970, with his wife Eliane Laffont, opened the U.S. office of Gamma Press Images agency. Laffont covered historical American events, such as the Civil Rights Movement, the Race Riots, the Vietnam War, the peace movement, as well as the gay and feminist movement.

In 1973, Laffont was one of the co-founders of the Sygma Photo News agency. His work expanded to the coverage of international events in Japan, Korea, Africa, India, China, the Middle East, Poland and the U.S.S.R. During those years, deeply touched by the suffering endured by children, he, from 1970 to 1980, made a major reportage on child labor throughout the world. The photographs he brought back from those countries were the first global photo essay on child labor and the most eloquent and cruel testimonials. Jean-Pierre has won the most prestigious awards in photojournalism for this series, including the Overseas Press Club's Madeline Dane Ross Award and first prize in the World Press General Picture category.

During the 80's, still photographing around the world, his work particularly focused on the U.S agricultural crisis, scientific research and world economy, mostly in Eastern Europe, the USSR, China, India and Third World countries. His photographs have been featured in major publications worldwide: Time, Newsweek, The New York Times, Paris Match, Le Figaro Magazine, Stern, Bunte, Época, The Sunday Times in London and Manchete, his work has also gained high recognition through numerous awards.

In 1999, Corbis acquired Sygma and Jean-Pierre Laffont was appointed General Director of Corbis Sygma in the U.S. In 2000, he left Corbis and was hired by Hachette Filipacchi Media U.S. as General Manager of Gamma Press USA.

Laffont currently resides in New York City.

== Awards and honors ==
- 1979: World Press Photo: 3rd Prize, General News
- 1980: First Prize: New York Newspaper Guild, for "Child Labor"; Overseas Press Club: Madeline Dane Ross Award, for originating the use of photography to raise awareness of child labor conditions around the world.
- 1981: Missouri School of Journalism First Prize; Special Recognition Award: World Understanding; World Press Photo: Honorable Mention, News Feature.
- 1996: Ordre des Arts et des Lettres (French National Order)
- 2016: International Photographer of the Year of The Pingyao Photo Festival; China.
- 2020:Visa d’Or Award du Figaro Magazine for Lifetime Achievement.
- 2021: Lucie Award for Achievement in Photojournalism.
- 2023: Knight of the Legion of Honor.
- 2025: Hermione Award at the FASNY 44.

== Shows and exhibitions ==
- 1996 – Visa pour l'Image (Perpignan, France)/ Retrospective
- 2012 – Visa pour l'Image (Perpignan, France)/ projection of "Mon Algérie"
- 2014 – Photographer's Paradise – Turbulent America 1960–1990, film – Visa pour l’Image, Perpignan, France
- 2015 – Turbulent America, Maison Europeenne de la Photographie (MEP), Paris, France
- 2015 – Photographer's Paradise – Foto Fusion: Cultural Center, Palm Beach, Florida, USA
- 2016 – Turbulent America – Photo Biennale, Central Exhibition Hall Manege, Moscow, Russia
- 2016 – Turbulent America, Tri Postal, Lille, France
- 2016 – Turbulent America, Pingyao International Photography Festival, Pingyao, China
- 2016 – Tumultueuse Amerique, Musee de L'Arsenal, Metz, France
- 2016 – Amérique: Mythes et Légendes, Eglise Saint-Vincent, Merignac, France
- 2017 – New York City Up and Down, Projection – Visa Pour l’Image, Perpignan, France
- 2017 – Jean Pierre Laffont, Un Francais à New York – Gallerie de l’Instant, Paris, France
- 2017–2018 – Turbulent America, Sous Les Etoiles Gallery, New York City, NY, USA.
- 2018 – Laffont's Long March – Beaugeste Gallery, Shanghai, China
- 2018 – New York Up and Down – Shenzhen Photo Festival, Shenzhen, China
- 2018 – Jean Pierre Laffont New York Down and Out – Leica New York City, NY, USA
- 2019 – Jean Pierre Laffont Turbulent America – Candiani, Mestre, Italy.
- 2019 – Mes Stars en Amèrique – Les Grandes Recontres Salon de La Photo, Paris, France.
- 2020 – Mes Stars en Amèrique – Galerie De L’Instant, Paris, France.
- 2020 – Twenty Five Icons of America by Jean Pierre Laffont online show – Sous Les Etoiles Gallery, New York City, NY, USA.
- 2023 – Gangs and Protests by Jean Pierre Laffont – Sous Les Etoiles Gallery, New York City, NY, USA.
- 2023/2024 – Hip-Hop: Conscious and Unconscious – Fotografiska New York, Stockholm & Berlin.

Ali vs. Frazier, Fights of the Century – Picto New York, NY, USA.

- 2024 – Turbulent New York – Xposure International Photo Festival, Sharjah, United Arab Emirates.

Jean Pierre Laffont’s New York Noir – Leica Gallery, Los Angeles, USA.

- 2025 – L’ Amérique Tumultueuse de Jean Pierre Laffont – French American School of NY (FASNY), Mamaroneck, NY.
- 2025 – Photographer Unchained (rétrospective) - Visa pour l'Image, Perpignan, France
- 2025 – Jean Pierre Laffont’s New York Noir – Leica Store, Washington DC, USA.

== Publications ==
=== Monographs ===
- 1976 – CB Bible, Porter Bibb (Doubleday)
- 1981 – Women of Iron (Playboy)
- 2008 – Jean-Pierre Laffont Foreign Correspondent (Editions C.D.P/France)
- 2014 – Photographer's Paradise: Turbulent America 1960 – 1990 (JP Laffont Photography/ Glitterati)
- 2017 – New York City Up and Down / (Glitterati)
- 2019 – Nos Stars en Amèrique Cartes postales de Jean Pierre Laffont / (Editions de La Martinière)
- 2021 – New York Noir - Jean Pierre Laffont (Peanut Press)

=== Contributor ===
- Contributions to various volumes of A Day in the Life Series (HarperCollins)
  - 1986 – The Long March (Intercontinental)
  - 1989 – Trois Jours en France(Nathan/France)
  - 1992 – America Then & Now (Cohen/ HarperCollins)
  - 1999 – Les 100 photos du Siècle (Chêne)
  - 2003 – America 24/7 in Manhattan (NY State)
  - 2011 – The New York Times magazine: Photographs (Aperture Foundation)
  - 2012 – 20 Years, Limited Edition (CDP)
  - 2013 – 40 Ans de Photojournalisme: Generation Sygma(Martinière/ France)
