= Richard Ellis (American photographer) =

American photographer

Richard Ellis (born 1960) is an American news photographer and founder of the photo agency Newsmakers, which was later acquired by Getty Images.

== Life and work ==
Ellis grew up in West Palm Beach, Florida. He attended the Southern Methodist University in 1978, and the George Washington University from 1979 to 1982.

He began his professional career in 1979 working as a freelance photographer for United Press International in Washington, D.C. In 1984, he joined Reuters, the British-based global news service, as a staff photographer in Hong Kong covering the People Power Revolution in the Philippines and dozens of stories throughout Asia. In 1986, he became Reuters chief photographer for South Asia based in New Delhi covering major news throughout the region, including the Soviet–Afghan War; he was the first western photographer allowed into Kabul. Ellis went to China for the Tiananmen protests. He hid on the first public bus allowed into the square following the massacre, which allowed him to provide the first pictures of the aftermath. Posted to China in 1989, he continued to cover post-Tiananmen China and was the last foreign correspondent to see Deng Xiaoping alive. He was nominated for a Pulitzer Prize as part of the Reuters team covering Tiananmen.

In 1991, Ellis, assigned to cover the first Gulf War, worked outside the controlled news pool traveling the desert of Saudi Arabia, providing uncensored images. He was nominated for the Pulitzer a second time as part of the Reuters coverage during the war.

In 1991 he established the Reuters UK photo service before moving to Moscow in 1992. While covering the collapse of the communist regime in Afghanistan, he captured images of the execution of a secret policeman. These resulted in his third nomination for a Pulitzer Prize, the first for his solo images.

Ellis left Reuters in 1994 after exposing faked pictures shot by Russian photographers for an American news magazine. Returning to Washington, DC, in 1994, he worked as a freelance photographer for Sygma, covering the presidency of Bill Clinton. While working in Washington, Ellis started the first Internet-based news photo agency called Newsmakers in 1995. In 1999, Newsmakers was acquired by Getty Images and became the foundation of the Getty Images News Service, which Ellis ran until 2001. Ellis continued with Getty Images in a variety of roles becoming Senior Vice President of Business Development in 2004.

His photographic work has been published in many major magazines and newspapers worldwide. Ellis is the only individual to ever create a global news photo wire service.

He currently lives with his wife and two daughters in Charleston, South Carolina.
