= Kristin Fisher =

American journalist and television news presenter (born 1983)

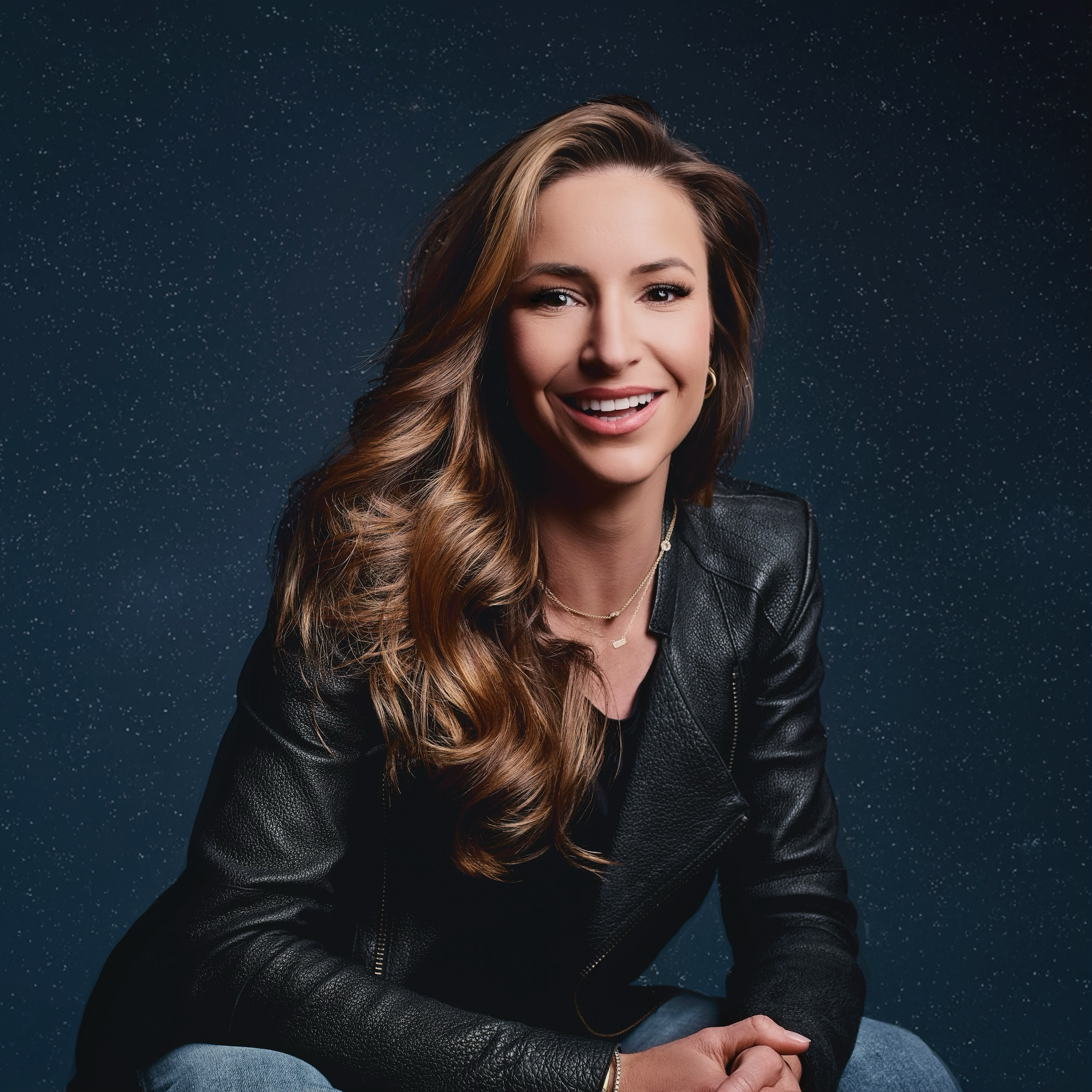
- Born: Kristin Anne Fisher; July 29, 1983 (age 42); Houston, Texas, U.S.
- Education: Boston University (BA)
- Occupation: Journalist
- Television: KATV; KJCT; WUSA-TV; Fox News; CNN
- Spouse: Walker Forehand (m. 2011)
- Children: 2
- Parents: William Frederick Fisher (father); Anna Lee Tingle (mother)
- Website: www.theendlessvoid.com

Kristin Fisher (born July 29, 1983) is an American journalist and Emmy Award winner. She previously served as a White House correspondent for Fox News and later as a space & defense correspondent for CNN. In 2025, she left legacy media to found Endless Void Media and launch The Endless Void, a YouTube channel focused on space exploration and unidentified aerial phenomena (UAPs).

== Early life ==
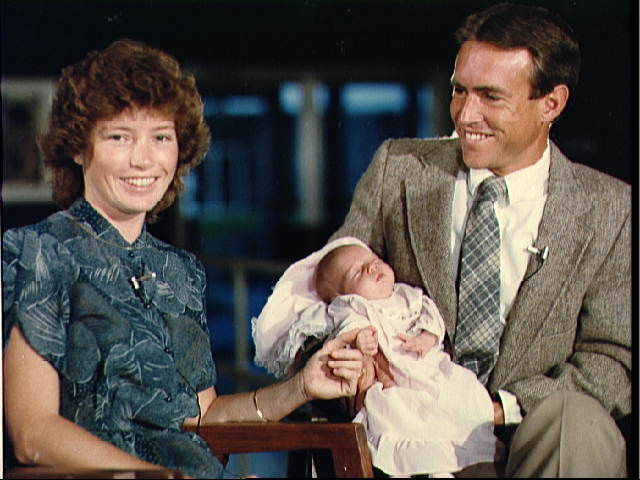
Astronauts Anna and Bill Fisher with their baby daughter Kristin Anne

Kristin Fisher was raised in Houston, Texas, the daughter of Dr. Anna Lee Fisher and Dr. William Frederick Fisher. Both her parents were astronauts and physicians who practice emergency medicine. She graduated from Boston University's College of Communication with a BA degree in broadcast journalism.

== Career ==
After school, Fisher worked for ABC-affiliate KJCT-LP in Grand Junction, Colorado and then ABC-affiliate KATV in Little Rock, Arkansas, where she covered the 2008 presidential campaigns of both Hillary Clinton and Mike Huckabee. In 2009, she moved to Washington, D.C. where she worked as a reporter for CBS-affiliate WUSA-TV and freelance correspondent ABC News/ABC NewsOne.

In 2015, she joined Fox News as a general assignment reporter in its DC bureau, replacing Molly Henneberg.

A few days before Thanksgiving 2019, Fisher's bureau chief offered her the position of White House correspondent, though he could not inform her what the position was at the time as he was only permitted to say that it was a position she would want. Fisher had been planning to host a holiday celebration for guests, including family members in town for a visit, but was intrigued by the secrecy, and trusting her chief, accepted the assignment. The day before Thanksgiving, she was instructed to pack warm clothes, and meet a man in a Washington, D.C. parking garage, whom she took to be a Secret Service agent. From there, she traveled to Joint Base Andrews, where she was required to have all of her electronic devices temporarily confiscated, before being flown to West Palm Beach, Florida. There, President Donald Trump boarded the plane back to Andrews, with Fisher the sole journalist on the plane. Back at Andrews, she and Trump boarded Air Force One, and flew to Afghanistan, where Trump would meet with U.S. troops and that nation's president, Ashraf Ghani, to discuss restarting negotiations with the Taliban.

In November 2020, Fisher pointed out inconsistencies and lack of evidence regarding Trump's attorneys' allegations of massive election fraud. She noted about Rudy Giuliani "What he is saying in public — not under oath — is different from what he said in court." She also underlined Giuliani's false claims about the vote certification controversy in Michigan, as well as his refusal to produce any of his supposed evidence to the public. She did the same with President Trump's statements in December, when several Republican judges, as well as several Trump-nominated public servants, had rejected claims of election fraud. In early 2021 it was announced that Fisher would be leaving Fox News. After leaving Fox, Fisher joined CNN in July 2021, where she serves as its Space & Defense correspondent.

In 2010, Fisher won an Emmy Award for her bi-weekly segments on heroes in the greater Washington community. Fisher also founded a documentary film company, Field Mouse Films, which made films for both news outlets and corporate clients.

In 2026 Fisher co-presented the fourth season of the BBC podcast 13 Minutes to the Moon covering the Artemis II mission.

== Personal life ==
In 2011, Fisher married Walker Harrison Forehand at the Church of the Holy City in Washington, D.C. She met her husband in Athens, Greece in 2003 while studying abroad. They have two children.
