= Stuart Franklin =

British photographer

Stuart Franklin (born 16 June 1956) is a British photographer. He is a member of Magnum Photos and was its President from 2006 to 2009.

== Early life and education ==
Franklin was born on 16 June 1956 at Guy's Hospital in London. He studied drawing under Leonard McComb in Oxford and Whitechapel, London, and from 1976 to 1979 photography at West Surrey College of Art and Design, where he graduated with a BA. Moreover, between 1995 and 1997, he studied geography at the University of Oxford, first receiving a BA and the Gibbs Prize for geography. He received a doctorate in Geography from the University of Oxford in 2000. Franklin was awarded a professorship in documentary photography in 2016. He taught photography and visual storytelling at Volda University College, Norway until July 2021. He is currently an affiliate professor at the University of Malta.

== Career ==
From 1980 until 1985, Franklin worked with Sygma in Paris. During that time he photographed the civil war in Lebanon, unemployment in Britain, famine in Sudan and the Heysel Stadium disaster.

Joining Magnum Photos in 1985, he became a full member in 1989. In the same year, Franklin photographed the uprising in Tiananmen Square and shot one of the Tank Man photographs, first published in Time magazine, as well as widely documenting the uprising in Beijing earning him a World Press Photo Award.

In 1989 Franklin traveled with Greenpeace to Antarctica. He worked on about twenty stories for National Geographic between 1991 and 2009, subjects including Inca conqueror Francisco Pizarro and the hydro-struggle in Quebec and places such as Buenos Aires and Malaysia. In addition, he worked on book and cultural projects. In October 2008, his book Footprint: Our Landscape in Flux was published by Thames & Hudson. An ominous photographic document of Europe’s changing landscape, it highlights Franklin's ecological concern.

During 2009 Franklin curated an exhibition on Gaza - Point of No Return for the Noorderlicht Photo Festival. Since 2009 he has focused on a long term landscape project in Norway published as Narcissus in 2013. More recently he has worked on documentary projects on doctors working in Syria, and immigration in Calais. Franklin's most recent book, The Documentary Impulse was published by Phaidon in April 2016. It investigates the nature of truth in reporting and the drive towards self-representation beginning 50,000 years ago with cave art through to the various iterations and impulses that have guided documentary photography along its differing tracks for nearly 200 years. Franklin was the general chair of the World Press Photo jury 2017. Franklin is currently working on a long term photographic essay in Malta and Southern Europe.

== Awards ==
- Christian Aid Award for Humanitarian Photography, 1985
- Tom Hopkinson Award, 1987
- Third prize stories, Spot News, World Press Photo Award, 1990
- Pictures of the Year International Award, 1990
- Gibbs Prize for geography, University of Oxford, 1997
- Honorary Fellowship of the Royal Photographic Society, 2003
- Feature of the Year, Medical Journalists' Association, 2021. Cover story on coronavirus in a London hospital for The Sunday Times magazine: Eye of the Storm.

== Books ==
- Tiananmen Square. London: Black Sun, 1989.
- The Time of Trees. Milan: Leonardo Arte, 1999. ISBN 88-8310-058-1.
- Alberi / Trees. Milan: Fondazione Nicola Trussardi / Charta, 2002. ISBN 88-8158-370-4.
- La Città Dinamica. Milan: Mondadori Electa, 2003. ISBN 88-370-2118-6.
- Sea Fever. Oxford: Bardwell, 2005. ISBN 0-9548683-4-X.
- Hotel Afrique. Stockport: Dewi Lewis, 2007. ISBN 978-1-904587-52-1
- Footprint: Our Landscape in Flux. London: Thames & Hudson, 2008. ISBN 978-0-500-54364-1.
- St Petersburg. St Petersburg: Perlov Design Center, 2012. ISBN 978-5-904442-08-8
- Narcissus. Ostfildern: Hatje Cantz, 2013. ISBN 978-3-7757-3554-4
- The Documentary Impulse. New York and London: Phaidon, 2016. ISBN 978-0-7148-7067-0
- Analogies. Berlin: Hatje Cantz, 2019. ISBN 978-3-7757-4530-7
- Ambiguity Revisited: Communicating with pictures. Hanover: Ibidem Verlag. 2020. ISBN 978-3-8382-13897
- Traces. Stockport: Dewi Lewis, 2023. ISBN 978-1-911306-96-2
