= Gérard Rancinan =

French photographer (born 1953)

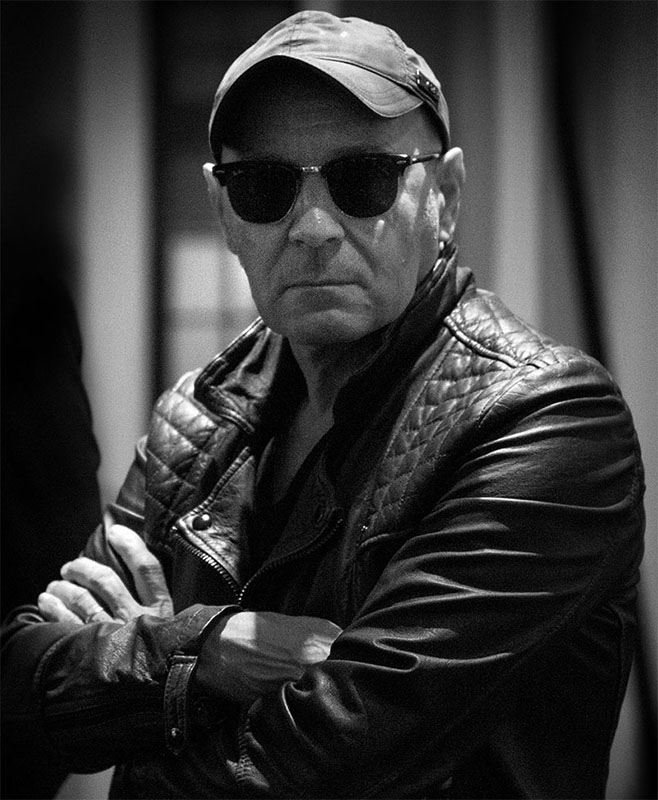
- Born: 1953 (age 72–73); Talence, France
- Occupations: Photographer, photojournalist
- Writing career
- Notable awards: Ordre des Arts et des Lettres (2013)
- Website: www.rancinan.com

Gérard Rancinan (born 1953) is a French photographer known for his portrait photography that comments on social issues, politics, and pop culture.

== Life and career ==
Gérard Rancinan began his career at age 15 as an apprentice in the photo lab of the Bordeaux daily newspaper Sud Ouest, where his father also worked. After completing a three-year apprenticeship, he started covering local news. At 21, Rancinan was assigned to the paper's agency in Pau.

In 1973, Rancinan signed a distribution contract with the newly formed Sygma press agency. Five years later, he joined Sygma as a staff photographer in Paris, where he covered global events, including earthquakes in Algeria, political unrest in Poland and conflict in Lebanon. He also photographed sporting events such as the Olympic Games and the FIFA World Cup, and worked on film sets for the movies Ran by Akira Kurosawa, Betty Blue by Jean-Jacques Beineix, and The Last Emperor by Bernardo Bertolucci).

Rancinan has made portraits of prominent figures. His projects are often collaborative, involving writers, journalists, sociologists, anthropologists, and philosophers.

== Publications ==
- Rois Sans Royaume. Nathan Image, 1986.
- Urban Jungle. Martinière, 1999.
- Rancinan Exploit. Milan: Federico Motta, 2004.
- La Trilogie du Sacré Sauvage. Milan: Federico Motta, 2005.
- The Photographer. New York: Abrams, 2008.
- Le Photographe. Martinière, 2008.
- Métamorphoses: conversations & natures mortes. Biro & Cohen, 2009. With Caroline Gaudriault.
- Hypothèses. Paradoxe, 2011. With Gaudriault.
- Wonderful World. Paradoxe, 2012. With Gaudriault.
- A Small Man in a Big World. Paradoxe, 2014. With Gaudriault and Francis Fukuyama.

== Films ==
- Sauvons l'amour (1986) – with Gabrielle Lazur, Fred Carol, François Siener; music by Charlélie Couture; 11 mins, 40 s; 35 mm; fiction/short film
- Héritage – Voyage au Pays de l'Homme (1995) – TF1, 52 mins, documentary
- Trilogy of the Moderns – Behind The Scenes (2012) – documentary, making of, on the work of Rancinan and Caroline Gaudriault, 52 mins; directed by Vincent Tavernier with commentaries by Paul Ardenne; French and English version

== Awards ==
- Rancinan has won World Press Photo awards at the 1984, 1985, 1986, and two in the 1989 competition
- "Picture of the Year International" in 2004 at the POY Awards, Missouri School of Journalism, USA
- Rancinan was made Chevalier des Arts et des Lettres in 2006 by the then French Minister of Culture, Renaud Donnedieu de Vabres. He was made Officier des Arts et des Lettres by the French Minister of Culture, Aurélie Filippetti in January 2013.

== Exhibitions ==
=== Solo exhibitions ===
- June–July 2007: Trilogy of the Sacred Savage, Triennale Bovisa di Milano Museum, Italy
- September 2008: The Photographer, Museum Palazzo Roma, Italy
- October 2009: Metamorphoses, still lives and conversations, Galerie Brugier, Rigail, Paris
- November–December 2009: Métamorphoses, Palais de Tokyo Museum of Contemporary Art, Paris
- March–April 2011: Rancinan in Paris, Opera Gallery London-Paris
- September–October 2011: Rancinan in London, Opera Gallery, London
- October–November 2011: Hypotheses, Chapelle Saint-Sauveur, Issy-les-Moulineaux, France
- November–December 2011: Rancinan in Hong Kong, Opera Gallery Hong Kong
- April–May 2012: Trilogy of the Moderns, Triennale di Milano, Italy
- May–June 2012: Wonderful World, The Future Tense, London. Curated by Ed Barttlet.
- September–October 2012: Wonderful World, Galerie Valérie Bach, Royal Icerink, Brussels, Belgium
- May–September 2013: Trilogy of the Moderns + Chaos, Danubiana Meulensteen Art Museum, Bratislava, Slovakia
- October–November 2013: The Feast of Barbarrian, Musée des arts et métiers, Paris
- April–June 2014: A Small Man in a Big World, Avant Premiere, Galerie Valerie Bach, Brussels, Belgium

=== Group exhibitions ===
- February–April 2014: Motopoetique, Musée d'art contemporain de Lyon. Curated by Paul Ardenne.
- June–September 2014: Tupi or not Tupi, Salomé Détail, Oscar Niemeyer Museum, Curitiba, Brazil
- June–September 2014: Festin de l'Art, The Big Supper, Pinault collection, Dinard, France. Curated by Jean Jacques Aillagon.
