= Eliane Laffont =

- Occupations: Editor and creative director
- Spouse(s): Jean-Pierre Laffont (1966–present)
- Children: 1 daughter
- Awards: Life Achievement Award from the Griffin Museum & the Golden Career award from Fotofusion

Eliane Laffont is a New York-based editor, creative director, image consultant and entrepreneur. She notably opened the U.S. office of Gamma Press Images with her husband Jean-Pierre Laffont in 1968 and in 1973 co-founded the breakaway Sygma Photo News Agency, the largest photography agency in the world. Laffont currently serves as a senior consultant for Visa pour l'Image.

== Early life ==
Laffont was born in Burgundy, France, and raised in North Africa, where she attended school in Casablanca, Morocco. She completed her studies in Paris, where she received dual philosophy and political science degrees.

In 1965, Laffont, along with close friends Michèle Ray, Martine Libersart and Betty Gérard, completed a 30,000 mile endurance race from Tierra del Fuego to Alaska for Renault. They travelled from Ushuaia, through to Central America, from Las Vegas and Canada to Anchorage, where the journey ended. In 1966, Eliane moved to the United States and married photojournalist Jean-Pierre Laffont.

== Career ==
=== Gamma Press Images ===
In 1968 Eliane and Jean-Pierre Laffont opened the first U.S office of Gamma Press Images. Originally a French photo agency, Gamma rose to prominence in May 1968 because of the documentation of the uprising in Paris and the Vietnam War. The first client that Laffont had was with John Durniak, the director of photography from Time, who once said in Popular Photography magazine that "Eliane Laffont was the pioneer of 'the French Connection' of the new wave of photo agencies".

=== Sygma Photo News Agency ===
Eliane and Jean-Pierre Laffont left Gamma and, in 1973, co-founded the breakaway agency Sygma Photo News Agency. Laffont initially served as general manager, and then as president of North America for three decades. Before Sygma was acquired in 1999, the agency had grown into the largest photo agency in the world. In 1998, Photographer's Forum magazine announced that "Sygma is now the largest and most successful photo news agency (in America) and Eliane Laffont has become one of the ... most respected businesswomen in the photography community."

In June 1999, it was announced that Bill Gates' Corbis Images had attained Sygma, resulting in Corbis Sygma. Laffont continued to oversee operations within Corbis Sygma's U.S. operations, and was appointed director of Corbis Sygma/ New York. Later, she was promoted to vice-president of editorial content.

In 2001, Laffont left Corbis Sygma.

=== Hachette Filipacchi Media ===
In 2000 Laffont joined Hachette Filipacchi Media, the New York subsidiary of Hachette Filipacchi Médias, one of the world's largest magazine publishers. Laffont became editorial director, supervising the photographic production in the U.S. and developing the photo division into three sections: photojournalism, photo illustration and photo reportage.

=== 2000s ===
Laffont actively contributes to the photography community, and still serves as a Senior Consultant for Visa pour l'Image, the largest international festival of photojournalism, in Perpignan, France. Arnold Drapkin, the director at Palm Beach Photo describes Laffont as "a towering figure in photojournalism and documentary photography, she is responsible for discovering and nurturing more photographers, helping to keep their dreams alive (and pay the rent), and inspiring them with her brand of tough love, to do their best creative work."

Currently, Laffont and her husband reside in New York City. They have one daughter, Stephanie, and two granddaughters, Sparrow and Silvie.

== Career overview ==
- 1968: Founded Gamma Press Images
- 1973: Founded Sygma Photo Agency
- 1978-1979: Director of photography for Look magazine
- 1979: Jury member, National Press Photographer's Association, Pictures of the Year Competition, University of Missouri
- 1987: Board of directors, Eddie Adams Workshop
- 1999: Appointed director of Corbis/Sygma
- 2000: Editorial director for Hachette Filipacchi Media
- 2001-2008: Contributing editor for American Photo
- 2003: On the board of directors for the Alexia Foundation
- 2003 - 2004: U.S. judge for French Association for Women Photojournalists
- 2005: On the board of directors at MediaStorm Multimedia, curator of the "Eddie Adams Show" at "Visa pour l'Image", Perpignan, France
- 2006: Jury member of World Press Photo Foundation, jury member of Getty Images grants program & jury member for the National Press Photographer's Association's Pictures of the Year International.
- 2008: Jury member for CHIPP (China International Photo Contest)

== Awards ==
- The Leica Medal of Excellence was awarded for the 1992 picture book 'In the Eye of Desert Storm', featuring 24 photographers from Sygma agency.
- In 2008 the Spotlight Award was given to the Visa pour l'Image consultants at the Lucie Awards.
- In 2009 Laffont was awarded the Life Achievement Award from the Griffin Museum

== Notable positions ==
- International Advisory Committee and jury member, W. Eugene Smith Award
- In 1985, 2008 and 2010, Laffont served as jury member for the Overseas Press Club
- Photo editor, "Day in the Life" book series
- Director of Photography for "A Day in the Life of Africa", published in 2002
- Curator of "In the Eye of Desert Storm", published by Nikon House in 1991
