= Claude Salhani =

20th-century Lebanese-American photographer, photojournalist, author

- Born: March 25, 1952; Cairo, Egypt
- Died: August 13, 2022 (aged 70); Paris, France
- Occupations: Photographer, journalist, editor, author
- Years active: 1981–2022
- Employer(s): Sygma, UPI, Reuters, Sipa Press
- Known for: Pulitzer Prize-nominated photos of the 1983 bombing on USMC HQ Beirut

Claude Salhani (March 25, 1952 – August 13, 2022) was born in Cairo. He was a Lebanese, French and American photographer for United Press International (UPI) and Reuters news agencies, later head of UPI Photos and UPI Foreign Desk Editor as well as policy expert and author, best known for his photographic reportage of the 23 October 1983 Beirut barracks bombings on the United States Marines. During his journalism career, Salhani covered Black September, the Lebanon Civil War, the Turkish invasion of Cyprus, the Dhofar War (Oman), the Iran–Iraq War, the 1982 Israeli invasion of Lebanon, the 1979 Iranian Revolution, the Gulf War, the Fall of the Berlin Wall, the Czech Velvet Revolution, and the Iraq War (Operation Enduring Freedom) as well as the wider Middle East, Europe, and Africa.

== Background ==
Claude Salhani was born on March 25, 1952, in Cairo, Egypt. In the 2000s, he earned an MA in Conflict Analysis and Management from Royal Roads University.

== Career ==
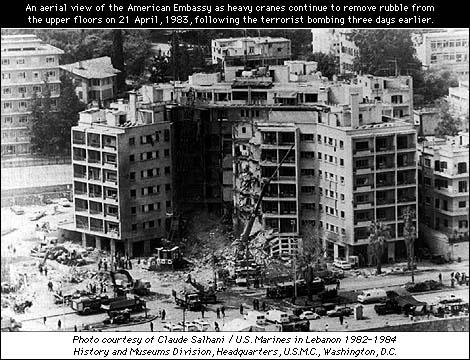
1983 Beirut embassy bombing, photographed by Claude Salhani

In 1970, age 18, Salhani joined An-Nahar and L'Orient-Le Jour newspapers in Beirut. He covered clashes between Jordanian and Palestinian forces ("Black September") in Jordan. By 1973, he had joined Sygma photo agency, whose clients included Time and Newsweek magazines, and landed photos on at least two covers of Time (1973, 1975). He worked for Sygma until 1980. In 1981, he became head of UPI Photos for the Middle East; in 1983, he covered the bombing of US Marine Corps barracks in Beirut. In 1984, he joined Reuters news agency as head of Reuters Photos for Europe, Middle East, and Africa; he lived in Brussels, London, and Paris. In the early 1990s, he moved to Washington, first to head US operations for Sipa Press and then to rejoin UPI as head of Photos through the rest of the 1990s and in 2000 international editor. He also served as editor for the Middle East Times and the Washington Times. Later, Salhani became a media analyst for major newspapers and an international television station. He contributed to publications by The National (UAE), the Cato Institute, and American Foreign Service Association. He also appeared on C-SPAN television.

== Personal life and death ==
Salhani married Cynthia Nuckolls; they had two children, Justin and Isabelle.

Salhani had many narrow escapes on the front lines. In 1981, Salhani inside the Reuters building when Israeli artillery hit it and escaped with minor injury. On another occasion, a Palestinian splinter group detained him; Yasser Arafat of the Palestine Liberation Organization secured his release. In 1983, while photographing the 1983 bombing of USMC HQ barracks in Beirut, he also helped dig out survivors.

Salhani was personal friends with Gibran Tueni, founder of An-Nahar. He was a mentor to many photographers and journalists, including UPI and Reuters colleagues Martin Sieff, Dalal Saoud, Aline Manoukian, and Jack Dabaghian, all of whom paid tribute to him.

Claude Salhani died age 70 on August 13, 2022, in Paris, France, and a service was held at Père Lachaise Cemetery.

== Awards ==
- Honorary US Marine Corps member for help during the 1983 bombing on USMC HQ Beirut
- Pulitzer Prize nominee for photographs of the 1983 bombing on USMC HQ Beirut

== Legacy ==
The US National Portrait Gallery has a photograph of Yasser Arafat by Salhani dated 1974.

Since the 1970s, Salhani's photos, editorials, and personal recollections also became sources for other books on history and policy, as well as for his own memoir, Black September to Desert Storm (1998).

In 1995, US Ambassador David D. Pearce called him "one of the premier photographers of the war in Lebanon." In 2022, UPI colleague Martin Sieff called him "the Willie Mays of journalism – he could – and did do everything well."

Occasionally, Salhani himself appeared as an actor in history, for example Thomas L. Friedman's 1990 book From Beirut to Jerusalem and David Petraeus and Nigel West's 2016 Spycraft Secrets.

Salhani contributed personal photos to US military historians including former US Marine Benis M. Frank in his 1987 book U.S. Marines in Lebanon, 1982-1984 and former US Navy SEAL Chuck Pfarrer in his 2003 book Warrior Soul.

== Works ==
=== Books ===
Books (Non-Fiction) Authored

- Black September to Desert Storm : A Journalist in the Middle East (1998)
- While the Arab World Slept: The Impact of the Bush years on the Middle East (2009)
- Islam Without a Veil: Kazakhstan's Path of Moderation (2011)

Books (Fiction) Authored

- Inauguration Day: A Thriller (2015)

=== Articles ===
Articles for UPI

- "The other Sept. remembrance" (2002)
- "Analysis: What is Plan B in the Iraq War?" (2003)
- "Iraq: One year Later" (2003)
- "Analysis: Preparing the post-Arafat Era" (2004)
- "Politics & Policies: Iran a Clear Danger" (2005)
- "Analysis: Today They Killed My Friend" (2005)
- "Politics & Policies: Ahmadinejad's Antics" (2005)
- "Jordanian Role Larger Than First Reported" (2006)
- "Intelligence Summit Takes Flak" (2007)
- "Analysis: Outsourcing war is good business" (2007)

Articles for The National (UAE)

- "Al Jazeera's historic role in Arab political change becomes a news story in itself" (2011)
- "Hamas cools to Syria as the Arab Spring's tally mounts" (2011)
- "Fighting an old war on terror requires new coordination" (2011)
- "Turkey takes a leading role in the region but not everyone applauds" (2011)

Articles for the Washington Times

- "Lebanon on a Tinderbox" (2006)
- "Kazakhstan assumes presidency of Europe security group" (2010)
- "Kazakh official warns against quitting Afghanistan" (2010)
- "Kazakh crackdown on media exposes vulnerabilities" (2010)
- "Revolt in Central Asia" (2010)
- "Key player in nuclear, Afghan security" (2010)
- "Is Iran behind an attempted coup?" (2010)

Articles for the Cato Institute

- "The Syria Accountability Act: Taking the Wrong Road to Damascus" (2005)

Articles for Foreign Service Journal

- "Resolving the Palestine Question" (2003)

Articles for The National Interest

- "Olmert's Secret Weapon: Prime Minister Deployed a Boomerang" (2006)
- "Live from Lebanon" (2006)
