= Dominique Lafont =

- Born: March 29, 1961 (age 65)
- Education: IEP Paris ESSEC
- Occupation: corporate leader

Dominique Lafont (born March 29, 1961), is a French corporate leader. In 2006, he became Managing Director for Africa in the Bolloré Group. On January 1, 2012, he was named President of Bolloré Africa Logistics, the Group subsidiary combining all of the Group's infrastructure and logistic activities both within Africa and outside the continent, across the major emerging countries trading with Africa.

== Education ==
Dominique Lafont holds degrees from Paris' IEP Institute of Political Science, the ESSEC Business School and a University degree in business law.

== Career path ==
Mr. Lafont began his professional career in 1987 with the Arthur Andersen audit firm. In 1995, he worked as the Director of Industrial Participations of the Rivaud Group, before joining the Bolloré Group following its friendly takeover of the Rivaud Group in 1997.

By 1999, Dominique Lafont became the Group's Financial Director for Africa. He then became the Managing Director for the Group activities in English-speaking Africa.

From 2006 to January 2015, he has been directing the entire range of Bolloré Group activities throughout Africa.

As of 2011, Dominique Lafont is Chevalier of the Légion d'honneur and also chairs the East African Committee of France's Medef International (business federation) and co-chairs the Montaigne Institute's think tank dedicated to African Affairs.
