= Les Stone =

American photojournalist

- Born: May 18, 1959 (age 67); New York, NY, US
- Occupation: Photojournalist
- Website: lesstone.com

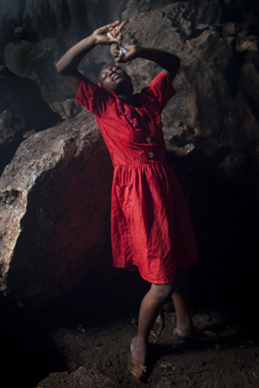
Vodou in Haiti, Les Stone

Les Stone (born in New York City, New York, 1959) is an American photojournalist. He has received several World Press Photo and Pictures of the Year International awards for his work spanning from 1989 to the present.

== Biography ==
In 1984 he graduated from Hampshire College with a BA in photography.

After graduation, Stone returned to New York City and worked in corporate and fashion photography. In 1986 he was hired as an assistant to the Metropolitan Transportation Authority photographer on Madison Avenue. Stone became the head photographer. For 4 years Stone worked at the MTA, photographing the entire transit system.

In 1987 for Stone's first overseas assignment he traveled to Port-au-Prince, Haiti to photograph the November 29th election.

On May 10, 1989, he photographed the bloody assault on the vice president-elect of Panama Guillermo Ford by members of the Batallón Dignidad, a paramilitary group employed by Generalissimo Manuel Noriega. He was one of only two American photographers to capture the attack on camera. After the publicity of Stone's photographs, he was called by Sygma to work with them for the next 11 years. With Sygma, he traveled extensively throughout the world, covering conflict in the Middle East, Ethiopia, Afghanistan and Kurdistan.

Stone's photographs have appeared in the following publications: National Geographic, the cover of Time, Life, Paris Match, Stern, Fortune, The New York Times, The New York Times Magazine, Smithsonian, Newsweek, Mother Jones, Panorama, GEO, TV Guide, and U.S. News & World Report. Les Stone has chronicled conflict in Iraq, Afghanistan, Israel, Kosovo, Liberia, Cambodia and Haiti. He worked on a documentary photo essay on the effects of Agent Orange in the Vietnamese countryside. He has traveled over 150 times to Haiti to cover Vodou ceremonies, political coups, and has produced a feature story on Haiti's Cholera epidemic. His photo essays also include the life of the Yanomami in the Amazon, Hurricane Katrina in New Orleans, and health issues of coal mining communities in Appalachia. In 2003, Stone joined the Vision Project founded in 2003, becoming a partner. Vision Project created a Podcast about Stone called Penetrating the Heart of the Image.

His work is represented by Pierogi Gallery in Brooklyn NY.

== Recent work ==
Stone received a grant to photograph health care in West Virginia. He has also pursued a documentary on black lung disease due to coal mining. He is an instructor at the Barefoot Workshops in Clarksdale, Mississippi since early 2012. He has worked for NGOs, and done photo essays of coffee growing in Guatemala, Honduras and Nicaragua, as well as education in Nicaragua for Christian Aid. He traveled to Rwanda and the Eastern Congo for the NGO Women for Women International. For Greenpeace Stone has worked on issues such as global warming in the Arctic, deforestation in Alaska, Cancer Alley, and coal fired power plants on the East Coast and Mid-West of the United States. The most recent was documentation of hydraulic fracturing or "fracking" in Bradford County, Pennsylvania and was awarded Top Photo by West Carolina Communications. Stone is currently working on a book of photographs of Vodou in Haiti. In November 2012, he covered the impact of Hurricane Sandy on the New Jersey coast for the American Red Cross, for which he won Editor's Choice Award from Reuters. On February 5, 2013, Stone received the Pictures of the Year International Award of Excellence in the News Division. On April 17, 2013, Stone's essay was published on his coverage of black lung disease in Appalachia.
