= Marie-Laure de Decker =

French photographer (1947–2023)

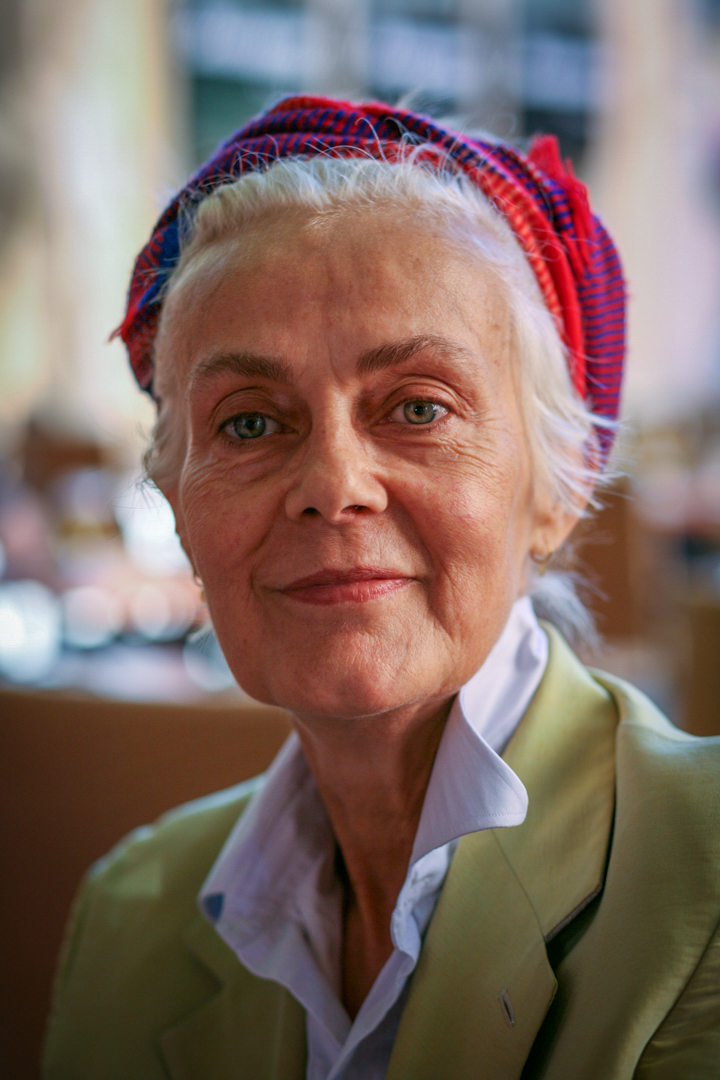
de Decker in 2007

Marie-Laure de Decker (French: [maʁi loʁ də dɛkɛʁ]; 2 August 1947 – 15 July 2023) was a French photographer. She was recognised for her war photography, including her coverage of the Vietnam War. She also covered conflicts in countries such as Yemen, Chad, and South Africa. Besides war photography, de Decker was a highly regarded portrait photographer, known for her depictions of prominent French figures.

== Biography ==
Marie-Laure de Decker was born on 2 August 1947 in Bône, French Algeria (now Annaba, Algeria). When she was twenty years old, she worked as a model. In her work, she met photographer Dominique Merlin and saw the footage that he captured for The Anderson Platoon, a documentary about the Vietnam War. Inspired by his work, she learned to develop film and became a photographer. To get her start in the industry, she tracked down artists that she admired, such as Man Ray and Marcel Duchamp, and asked to take their photographs.

De Decker started working in war photography when she joined Newsweek's team in Saigon to document the Vietnam War. She then covered conflicts in several other countries, such as Yemen, Chad, and South Africa. She visited South Africa to cover the country's racial conflict, where she met with Nelson Mandela. While in Chad, she interacted extensively with the Wodaabe people. She enjoyed working with the Wodaabe as they were one of the few groups who were not involved in the military conflict, and she wished to preserve their culture through photography as their population declined.

De Decker moved to a home near Rabastens in the 1990s, where she had spent time as a child when visiting her aunt. She held an exhibition in 2002 for her photography of the city. De Decker had her first son with Chilean political opponent Teo Saavedra and then married the lawyer Thierry Levy, with whom she had a second son. She began working as a photographer for Gamma in 1971 through 2009. After her work with Gamma, she became involved in a legal dispute to retain the rights to the photographs she took for the agency, which she ultimately lost. She was awarded the Albert Kahn International Planet Prize in 2013 for her war photography. She died in Toulouse on 15 July 2023, at the age of 75.

== Photography ==
De Decker was recognised internationally for her war photography, and she is most identified with her photographs from the Vietnam War. She consistently used Leica cameras throughout her career, and she chose not to learn digital photography, deeming it too complicated.

De Decker was also active in portrait photography, including frequent selfies. Many of her photographs were of celebrities. She preferred wartime photography, and she used celebrity photographs to fund her travel abroad. Celebrities who have become subjects of her photographs include visual artists such as Man Ray and Marcel Duchamp, writers such as Philippe Soupault, actors such as Catherine Deneuve and Charlotte Rampling, musicians such as Serge Gainsbourg, and political figures such as Princess Caroline of Monaco and Valéry Giscard d'Estaing.
