= François Lochon =

French photojournalist

François Lochon (born 16 May 1954) is a French photojournalist. He started his career at the Gamma agency in 1974. He has written reports from 140 countries.

He won three prizes for his work at the World Press Photo contest and was rewarded as best reporter by the French magazine Paris Match in 1984 for a report on the Iran-Iraq war. After that, he wrote reports mostly on Pope John Paul II and on Antarctica where he stayed for six months.

There was a display of his best photographs at the Luxembourg Garden in the 5th arrondissement of Paris in 2008.
