= Font (disambiguation) =

Font may refer to:

== Typography ==
- Typeface, a design of letters, numbers and other symbols, to be used in printing or for electronic display. Most typefaces include variations in size, weight, style, and so on. Each of these variations of the typeface is a font. Since the 1990s, many people outside the printing industry have used the word font as a synonym for typeface
- Font, a particular size, weight and style of a typeface
- Computer font, a digital file storing typeface/font data

== Religion ==
- Holy water font, a vessel for holy water, often seen at the entrance of a church
- Baptismal font, a container for holy water used in the Christian ceremonial of baptism

== People with the surname ==
- Adam Font (fl. 1509–1525), former mayor of Galway in modern-day Ireland
- Alfonso Font, Spanish comics artist
- Anamaría Font, Venezuelan theoretical physicist
- Anton Font, Spanish mime artist
- Bruno Font (born 2004), Spanish field hockey player
- Carlos Font (born 1960), Andorran alpine skier
- Daniel Font (born 1993), Welsh badminton player
- Eleanor Sherman Font, American iconographer
- Ferran Font (born 1996), Spanish roller hockey player
- Gabriel Boric Font (born 1986), president of Chile from 2022 to 2026
- Gemma Font (born 1999), Spanish football goalkeeper
  - Txell Font (born 2004), Spanish football goalkeeper, younger sister of Gemma Font
- Geoffrey Font, Irish centenarian
- Héctor Font (born 1984), Spanish footballer
- Jeanne de la Font, French poet
- Jesús Font, Spanish hurdler
- Jordi Font, Spanish snowboarder
- Jorge de Castro Font, Puerto Rican politician
- José Font, Argentine labor organizer
- Joseph de La Font, French playwright
- Laia Font, Spanish gymnast
- Luz Odilia Font (1929–2022), Puerto Rican actress
- Maria Pilar Riba Font (1944–2026), Andorran politician
- Marlene Font (born 1954), Cuban fencer
- Martin Font (fl. 1520–1522), former mayor of Galway
- Miguel Font (born 1963), Andorran alpine skier
- Nuria Marín Font, Spanish television presenter
- Omar Font (born 1990), Spanish Paralympic swimmer
- Pedro Font (1737–1781), Franciscan missionary and diarist
- Pierre Jules de la Font, French general
- Rob Font (born 1987), American mixed martial artist
- Roberto Font, Mexican actor
- Sándor Font, Hungarian politician
- Teresa Font, Spanish film editor
- Waldemar Font, Cuban boxer
- Wilmer Font (born 1990), Venezuelan baseball player

== Locations ==
- Font, Switzerland, a municipality of the canton of Fribourg
- Font Hill Beach, a beach on the south coast of Jamaica
- La Font de la Figuera, a municipality in Spain
- La Font de la Guatlla, a neighborhood in Barcelona, Spain
- La Font d'En Carròs, a municipality in Spain
- River Font, a river in Northumberland, England

== Other ==
- Fountain (archaic usage, also spelled fount)
- Kerosene lamp font, the container at the base of an oil or kerosene lamp that holds the oil, also spelled fount
