= Sygma (agency) =

French photo agency

Sygma (formally known as Agence Presse Sygma or Sygma Photo News) was a French photo agency. Sygma was established in 1973, was acquired by Corbis in 1999, and went bankrupt in 2011. It was one of the largest and leading photo agencies, with offices in Paris, London and New York City, and about 500 photographers under contract.

Sygma's archive of 50 million objects is stored at the Sygma Preservation and Access Facility in Garnay near Paris.

== History ==
Sygma was founded in 1973 by Hubert Henrotte (co-founder of the Gamma agency) and other photographers from Gamma including Eliane Laffont and Jean-Pierre Laffont.

It was one of the largest and leading photo agencies, with offices in Paris, London and New York City, and about 500 photographers under contract.

It was acquired by Bill Gates' Corbis in 1999 and the new organisation was called Corbis Sygma.

Sygma declared bankruptcy and shut down operations in 2011 when it could not afford to pay damages resulting from a court case.

== Members of Sygma (1973–1999) ==
- Dominique Aubert
- Richard Ellis
- Stuart Franklin
- Yannis Kontos
- Peter Marlow
- Caterine Milinaire
- Gérard Rancinan (joined 1973)
- Sebastião Salgado (1974–1975)
- Claude Salhani (1970s)
- Christine Spengler
- Les Stone
- Alfred Yaghobzadeh

== Sygma Preservation and Access Facility ==
Sygma's archive includes 50 million objects from the second half of the 20th century. It is stored at the Sygma Preservation and Access Facility, a dedicated facility in Garnay, near Paris, established in 2009.
