= Gamma (agency) =

French photo agency

Gamma is a French photo agency, founded in 1966 by Raymond Depardon, Hubert Henrotte, Hugues Vassal and Léonard de Raemy. Gilles Caron joined the agency shortly after its foundation. Gamma became a prestigious photojournalism agency: photographers who have worked at Gamma include William Karel, Georges Merillon, Chas Gerretsen, Catherine Leroy, Françoise Demulder, Emanuele Scorcelletti, Michel Laurent (photojournalist), and Marie-Laure de Decker.

In 1999, the agency was bought by Hachette Filipacchi photo group (GHFP), a division of Hachette Filipacchi Médias. Their name changed to the Eyedea group in March 2007, amidst reports that the agency was in financial distress. It was sold again in 2007 to Green Recovery, an investment fund that buys distressed companies. On 28 July 2009, the parent company sought protection from creditors after making a loss of €3 million euro. In April 2010, the commercial court in Paris ruled that François Lochon, former general director of Gamma Agency, would buy the Eyedea group for 100,000 euro.

== See also ==
- Associated Press
- Black Star (photo agency)
- Magnum Photos
- Panos Pictures
- Sipa Press
- Sygma (agency)
- VII Photo Agency
- Zuma Press
