= NASA Astronaut Group 6 =

1967 human spaceflight selection of 11 candidates; "The XS-11"

XS-11 (The Excess Eleven)
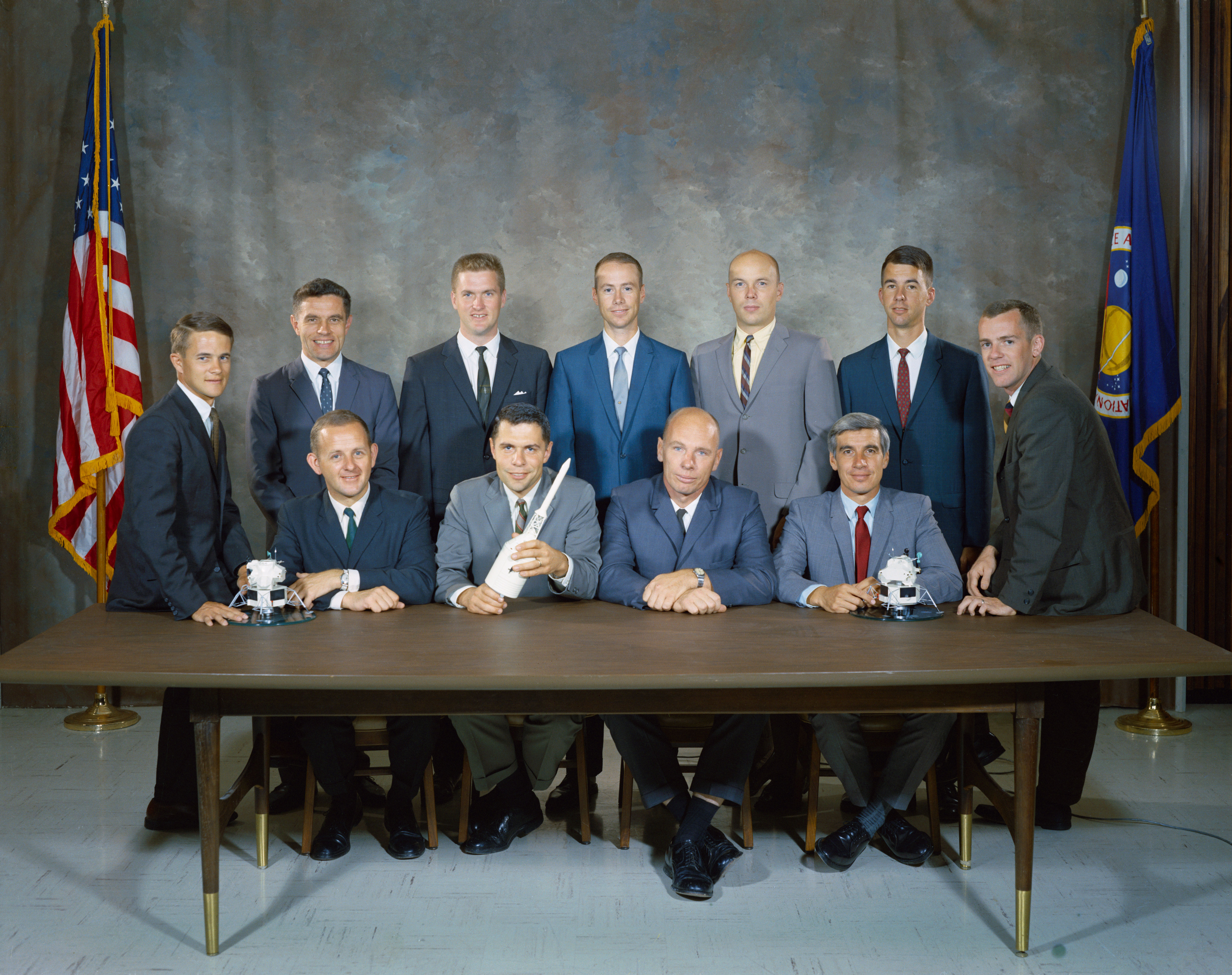
- Group 6 astronauts. Back row, L-R: Henize, England, Holmquest, Musgrave, Lenoir. Front row, L-R: Chapman, Parker, Thornton, Llewellyn. Flanking the group are Allen (left) and O'Leary (right)
- Year selected: 1967
- Number selected: 11

NASA Astronaut Group 6 (nicknamed The "XS-11", "Excess Eleven") was a group of eleven astronauts announced by NASA on August 4, 1967, the second group of scientist-astronauts. Given the lack of post-Apollo program funding, with the Apollo Applications Program being absorbed into the Skylab program, and NASA's existing surplus of astronauts, they did not expect any of the group to fly in space. Director of Flight Crew Operations Deke Slayton had planned to hire 20 to 30 new scientist-astronauts, but NASA found that only 11 of the 923 applicants were qualified, and hired them all.

When the group reported to the Manned Spacecraft Center, Slayton told them that "We don't need you around here". He offered to accept their resignations, and promised ground assignments if they did not quit, but warned them to not fool themselves that they would soon fly in space. With self-deprecation, the men named themselves the "XS-11", or "Excess Eleven".

The group would be the last group selected by NASA for over a decade. The seven members who stayed with NASA after the Apollo Program ended went on to form the core of early Space Shuttle mission specialists, accomplishing a total of 15 flights between 1982 and 1996.

== Background ==
By 1966, NASA had formulated ambitious plans for the Apollo Applications Program (AAP) that would follow the Apollo program. These called for Apollo hardware to be used to create space stations in Earth and lunar orbit, the development of a Space Shuttle to service them, and further visits to the Moon, as many as six a year, leading to the establishment of permanent bases there. Plans called for no less than 45 crewed missions, utilizing 19 Saturn V and 26 Saturn IB rockets. There would be three orbital workshops, three orbital laboratories and four Apollo Telescope Mounts. The first AAP launch was expected to occur as early as April 1968 if the Moon landing went well. Each orbital laboratory was expected to be visited by two or three crews.

Slayton estimated that he would need 24 astronauts to fly the scheduled Apollo missions, and he had 31 on hand from the selections conducted in 1959, 1962, 1963 and 1965. This was barely sufficient for Apollo, but not enough to allow AAP missions to be flown at the same time. While Slayton and other NASA officials held private doubts about whether AAP would be approved and flown as planned, it was important that it would not be delayed or sidetracked by a shortage of astronauts. To carry out the program, nineteen pilot astronauts were selected in 1966. NASA also decided to augment the scientist astronauts selected in 1965 with a second intake.

== Selection ==
NASA issued a call for applications for scientist astronauts on September 26, 1966. The National Academy of Sciences (NAS) would conduct initial screening of candidates and forward their applications to NASA for selection. Accompanying the press release was a statement from Gene Shoemaker, the chairman of the NAS selection panel, which said:

An early Apollo mission will place an astronaut on the surface of the Moon to observe first hand both a wholly new environment and unknown phenomena. Subsequent flights may provide the opportunity to carry out long-term studies from manned orbiting laboratories above the Earth's atmosphere in astronomy, solar physics, magnetic fields and energetic particles; or, viewing the Earth from space, in meteorology, oceanography and geology. Release from the Earth's gravity will permit biologists and physicians to conduct sophisticated experimentation on the nature and properties of fundamental biological processes. A vast scientific frontier will be thus opened to exploration by competent scientists. The observations will provide the world with new facts and hypotheses in the study of the solar system and life.

Key selection criteria were the same as for the 1965 intake. Candidates had to:

- Be a United States citizen, or become one by March 15, 1967;
- Born on or after August 1, 1930;
- 6 feet 0 inches (1.83 m) or less in height;
- With a doctorate in the natural sciences, medicine or engineering, or the equivalent; and
- Meet the physical requirement for pilots.

The announcement said that exceptions might be made for outstanding candidates, but height requirement was firm, an artifact of the size of the Apollo spacecraft. Applicants had to provide supporting documentation in the form of academic transcripts, multiple references, a research bibliography and medical history. The deadline for applications was midnight, January 8, 1967. It was expected that between twenty and thirty astronauts would be selected.

By the deadline, 923 applications had been received. The NAS selection panel then went through them, and forwarded 69 on to NASA for consideration. For these candidates, background and security checks were conducted by the United States Civil Service Commission. They were then subjected to a week of physical and psychological tests and examinations at the USAF School of Aerospace Medicine at Brooks Air Force Base in San Antonio, Texas. This reduced the number of candidates to 21.

Interviews were conducted at the Manned Spacecraft Center near Houston, Texas, by Mercury Seven astronaut Deke Slayton, NASA's Director of Flight Crew Operations; the Chief of the Astronaut Office, Alan Shepard; Wilmot N. Hess, the NASA Director of Science and Applications; NASA physician Charles Berry; scientist astronaut Owen Garriott; Maxime Faget, the chief engineer of the Apollo Program; and Robert F. Thompson, the head of the Apollo Applications Program. Finally, they were taken to Ellington Air Force Base where they were given a test flight in a Northrop T-38 Talon to measure their degree of comfort with flying. The names of the eleven successful candidates were officially announced on August 4, 1967.

The group were demographically similar to previous astronaut groups: all were male and white, and all were married, seven with children. Two were born outside the United States. William E. Thornton and Karl Henize were over the age limit. They had written to Slayton during the selection process, and Slayton had informed them that the requirement would be waived for specially qualified individuals like themselves, a decision supported by the director of the Manned Spacecraft Center, Robert R. Gilruth, and Chris Kraft. The group contained three astronomers, two physicists, a chemist, a geophysicist, an electrical engineer, two physiologists and a physician/physicist.

== Group members ==
The XS-11
Image	Name	Born	Died	Career	ref
Portrait	Joseph P. Allen IV	Crawfordsville, Indiana; June 27, 1937		Allen received a Bachelor of Arts degree in mathematics and physics from DePauw University in 1959, and Master of Science and a Doctor of Philosophy degrees in physics from Yale University in 1961 and 1965 respectively. From August 1975 to 1978, Allen served as NASA Assistant Administrator for Legislative Affairs in Washington, D.C. Returning to the Johnson Space Center in 1978, as a senior scientist astronaut, Allen was assigned to the Operations Mission Development Group. He served as a support crew member for the first orbital flight test of the Space Shuttle (Columbia) in April 1981 and was the CAPCOM during the reentry phase for this mission. In 1980 and 1981, he worked as the technical assistant to the director of flight operations. He flew in space as a mission specialist on the STS-5 Columbia mission in November 1982 and the STS-51-A Discovery in November 1984. He logged a total of 314 hours in space. He left NASA in 1985.	
Portrait	Philip K. Chapman	Melbourne, Australia; March 5, 1935	April 5, 2021	Chapman earned a Bachelor of Science degree in physics and mathematics from the University of Sydney in 1956. He then attended the Massachusetts Institute of Technology in the United States, earning a Master of Science in aeronautics and astronautics in 1964 and a Doctor of Science in instrumentation in 1967. He was a Royal Australian Air Force reservist from 1953 to 1955. He served as mission scientist on the Apollo 14 mission before resigning from NASA in July 1972 due to lack of spaceflight opportunities. First Australian American to be selected as an astronaut.	
Portrait	Anthony W. England	Indianapolis, Indiana; May 15, 1942		England received Bachelor of Science and Master of Science degrees in Earth sciences and planetary sciences from Massachusetts Institute of Technology (MIT) in 1965, and a Doctor of Philosophy degree in Earth and planetary sciences from MIT in 1970. He transferred to the U.S. Geological Survey in 1972 before rejoining NASA in 1979, and flew in space as a mission specialist on STS-51-F Challenger in the July 1985 Spacelab mission. From May 1986 to May 1987, he served as a program scientist for Space Station Freedom (which evolved into the International Space Station). From June 1987 to December 1987, he taught remote sensing geophysics at Rice University. He retired from NASA in 1988.	
Portrait	Karl G. Henize	Cincinnati, Ohio; October 17, 1926	October 5, 1993	Henize entered the V-12 Navy College Training Program, which first took him to Denison University in Granville, Ohio, and then to the University of Virginia. World War II ended before he received his Naval commission, so he became a member of the U.S. Naval Reserve, reaching the rank of lieutenant commander. He received a Bachelor of Arts degree in mathematics in 1947, and a Master of Arts degree in astronomy in 1948, from the University of Virginia, while also carrying out research at McCormick Observatory. He was awarded a Doctor of Philosophy in astronomy in 1954 by the University of Michigan. He flew in space as a mission specialist on the July 1985 STS-51-F Challenger Spacelab mission. He died from high altitude pulmonary edema (HAPE) during an ascent of Mount Everest.	
Portrait	Donald L. Holmquest	Dallas, Texas; April 7, 1939		Holmquest received a B.S. in electrical engineering from Southern Methodist University in 1962, and Doctor of Medicine and Doctor of Philosophy degrees in physiology from Baylor College of Medicine in 1967 and 1968, respectively, and a Juris Doctor degree from the University of Houston in 1988. He completed initial training and work on Skylab habitability systems and medical experiments, but left NASA in September 1973 following two extended leaves (encompassing post-doctoral training in nuclear medicine at Baylor University) due to lack of spaceflight opportunities.	
Portrait	William B. Lenoir	Miami, Florida; March 14, 1939	August 26, 2010	Lenoir received a Bachelor of Science degree in electrical engineering from the Massachusetts Institute of Technology in 1961, a Master of Science degree in 1962, and a Doctor of Philosophy degree in electrical engineering and computer science in 1965. Having first served as backup science pilot for Skylab 3 and Skylab 4 (the second and third crewed missions in the Skylab program), Lenoir finally flew in space as a mission specialist on STS-5 Columbia in November 1982. He resigned from NASA in September 1984 to assume a position with the management and technology consulting firm of Booz, Allen & Hamilton, but returned in June 1989 as the Associate Administrator for Space Flight, responsible for the development, operating and implementation of the necessary policy for the Space Shuttle and all U.S. government civil launch activities. He resigned from NASA in April 1992.	
Portrait	J. Anthony Llewellyn	Cardiff, Wales, United Kingdom; April 22, 1933	July 2, 2013	Llewellyn received his Bachelor of Science degree and Doctor of Philosophy degrees in chemistry from University College, Cardiff, in 1955 and 1958 respectively. He dropped out of flight school and resigned from NASA in September 1968.	
Portrait	F. Story Musgrave	Stockbridge, Massachusetts; August 19, 1935		Musgrave joined the United States Marine Corps in 1953, served as an aviation electrician and instrument technician, and as an aircraft crew chief on board the aircraft carrier USS Wasp. He received a Bachelor of Science degree in mathematics and statistics from Syracuse University in 1958, a Master of Business Administration degree in operations analysis and computer programming from the University of California at Los Angeles in 1959, a Bachelor of Arts degree in chemistry from Marietta College in 1960, a Doctor of Medicine degree from Columbia University in 1964, a Master of Science degree in physiology and biophysics from the University of Kentucky in 1966, and a Master of Arts in literature from the University of Houston in 1987. He was the first of the group to serve on a backup crew, Skylab 2 in 1973, and was a CAPCOM for the Skylab 3 and Skylab 4 missions. He participated in the design and development of the Space Shuttle extra-vehicular activity equipment, including spacesuits, life support systems, airlocks and Manned Maneuvering Units. From 1979 to 1982, and 1983 to 1984, he was a test and verification pilot in the Shuttle Avionics Integration Laboratory at the Johnson Space Center. He flew in space six times: as mission specialist on the STS-6 Challenger mission in April 1983, STS-51-F Challenger Spacelab mission in July 1985, STS-33 Discovery mission in November 1989, STS-44 Atlantis mission in November 1991, STS-61 Endeavour Hubble Space Telescope Servicing mission as payload commander in December 1993, and the STS-80 Columbia mission in November 1996. He is the only astronaut to have flown on all five Space Shuttles. He retired from NASA in 1997.	
Portrait	Brian T. O'Leary	Boston, Massachusetts; January 27, 1940	July 28, 2011	O'Leary received a Bachelor of Arts degree in physics from Williams College in 1961, a Master of Arts in astronomy from Georgetown University in 1964, and a Doctor of Philosophy in astronomy from the University of California, Berkeley, in 1967. He resigned from NASA in April 1968 due to objections to flight training hazards.	
Portrait	Robert A. R. Parker	New York City; December 14, 1936		Parker received a Bachelor of Arts degree in astronomy and physics from Amherst College in 1958, and a Doctor of Philosophy in astronomy from the California Institute of Technology in 1962. He flew in space as a mission specialist on two Spacelab missions, the STS-9 Columbia mission in November 1983 and the STS-35 Columbia mission in December 1990. He was director of the Division of Policy and Plans for the Office of Space Flight at NASA Headquarters in Washington, D.C. from January 1991 to December 1991, director of the Spacelab and Operations Program from January 1992 to November 1993, manager of the Space Operations Utilization Program from December 1993 to August 1997, and director of the NASA Management Office at the Jet Propulsion Laboratory in Pasadena, California, from August 1997 to August 2005. He retired from NASA on August 31, 2005.	
Portrait	William E. Thornton	Faison, North Carolina; April 14, 1929	January 11, 2021	Thornton received a Bachelor of Science degree in physics from the University of North Carolina in 1952. Having completed Air Force ROTC training, he served as officer-in-charge of the Instrumentation Lab at the Flight Test Air Proving Ground, and later became a consultant to Air Proving Ground Command. He earned a Doctorate in Medicine from University of North Carolina in 1963. He completed his internship in 1964 at the Wilford Hall USAF Hospital at Lackland Air Force Base in San Antonio, Texas, and then returned to active duty with the United States Air Force, and was assigned to the USAF Aerospace Medical Division at Brooks Air Force Base in San Antonio, where he completed the Primary Flight Surgeon's training in 1964. He flew in space as a mission specialist on the STS-8 Challenger mission in August 1983 and the STS-51-B Challenger Spacelab mission in April 1985. He resigned from NASA effective May 31, 1994.	

== Training ==
While their selection process had been going on, NASA's budget for fiscal year 1968 had been cut. President Lyndon B. Johnson had proposed that NASA's budget be increased to $5.1 billion, of which $455 million was for the AAP, but Congress was not receptive. The Apollo 1 fire on January 27, 1967, had shaken its faith in NASA, and the cost of the Vietnam War was inexorably rising. NASA's appropriation was cut to $4.59 billion, with AAP receiving only $122 million. When the eleven new astronauts reported for duty on September 18, 1967, they were met by Shepard and Slayton. In his welcome address to the newcomers, Slayton was blunt:

I might as well warn you troops that you won't be seeing any action for quite some time. We've been receiving word from Washington that the budget in the post-Apollo Program will be severely cut again next year and many flights will have to be postponed or scrapped. And it looks like things aren't going to get any better for a long time. Although we'd like to put all of you into space some time, we can't guarantee it, so you may as well face the prospect of long delays and perhaps no flights. We don't need you around here, at least for the time being. I'm saying this just so you'd understand. So bearing this in mind, any of you who feels like he doesn't want to hack this can walk out of the room right now. You'll be a free man and there'll be no misgivings either way.

The new astronaut group started calling themselves the Excess Eleven or XS-11. Assignments for the group were further delayed by the requirement to complete a full year of US Air Force Undergraduate Pilot Training to become qualified as jet pilots like the Group 4 scientists before them. But first there was five months of classroom training, 330 hours of instruction, mainly in the form of lectures and field trips. Many of these were delivered by the astronauts themselves, and there was even a guest lecture on exobiology by Carl Sagan. Normally, there were two lectures per day of two hours duration, with afternoons and every other Friday free to allow the new scientist astronauts to pursue personal projects.

The next phase of their training was flight training. Only Chapman had a private pilot's license, and of the rest only Musgrave had flown a plane before. None had flown jets. While the Excess Eleven had hoped that it would be possible for them to undergo it together, this was considered impractical, as the US Air Force's training facilities were stretched by the needs of the war in Vietnam. Instead they were sent to several different flight schools in Arizona, Oklahoma and Texas. Training commenced with six weeks in the piston engine Cessna T-41 Mescalero, then moved on to twenty in the subsonic jet Cessna T-37 Tweet, and finally to twenty-seven weeks in the Northrop T-38 Talon, the aircraft they would be flying for NASA. By this time four astronauts had been killed in accidents involving the T-38.

About a third of each flight school class flunked, were dropped because they developed a fear of flying, or quit, usually because they discovered that they did not like flying. The response of the scientist astronauts was mixed. Chapman found that he really enjoyed flying, especially in the T-38, and came second in his class; Musgrave and Allen topped theirs. O'Leary objected to the hazards of flight training, and after a month of flight training at Williams Air Force Base, including two solo flights, he decided that he did not like flying. On April 22 he informed a sympathetic Slayton that he had decided to resign from the Astronaut Corps. On August 23, NASA announced that Llewellyn had also tended his resignation after completing the first phase of flight training at Reese Air Force Base.

The final phase of their astronaut training involved scuba diving training with the Navy at the Naval Air Station Key West, desert survival training at Fairchild Air Force Base in Washington, jungle survival training at Albrook Air Force Base in Panama, and water survival training at Pensacola Naval Air Station in Florida.

== Operations ==
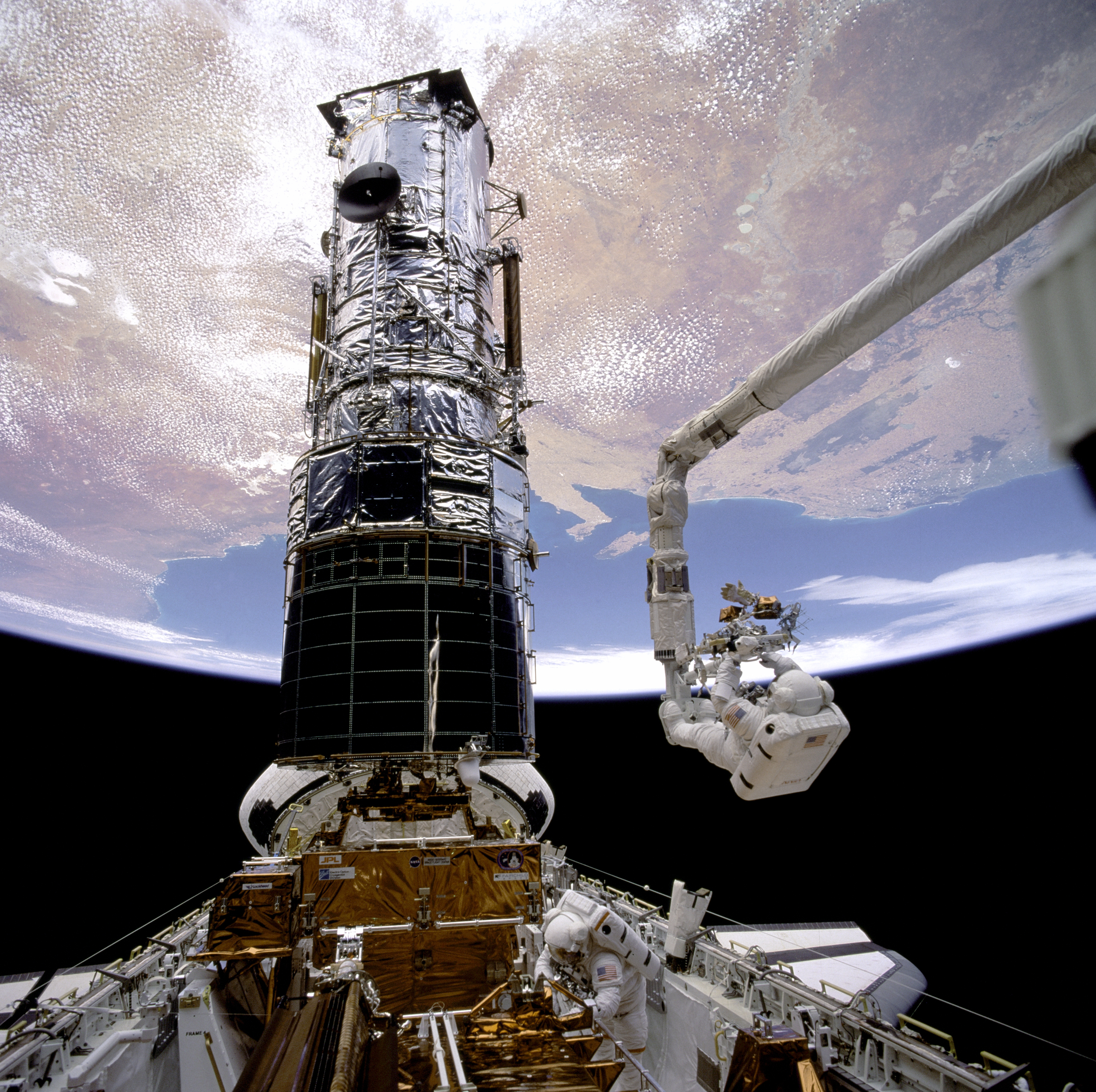
Musgrave, anchored on the end of the Remote Manipulator System arm, prepares to be elevated to the top of the Hubble Space Telescope in 1993

After completing their training, the XS-11 were divided between Apollo and AAP, with Allen, Chapman, England, Henize and Parker assigned to Apollo. A new role, the mission scientist, was created as an interface between the crew and the scientific community, as scientific aspects became more important with the later Apollo missions. The first so designated was England on Apollo 13, although owing to the abort of the mission, he was not called upon to perform the role. Starting with Apollo 14, the mission scientist was part of the support crew. Chapman served in the role on Apollo 14, Allen on Apollo 15, England on Apollo 16 and Parker on Apollo 17. In addition Henize and Parker also served on the Apollo 15 support crew, and Chapman on that of Apollo 16.

Holmquest, Lenoir, Musgrave and Thornton were assigned to Skylab, as AAP was renamed on February 17, 1970. Musgrave (who cultivated a notable passion for flying, eventually accumulating over 17,700 hours in 160 different types of civilian and military aircraft) and Lenoir were the first members of the group to secure potential flight assignments as backup Science Pilots in the Skylab Program. However, Skylab B was canceled and Skylab A abandoned in place after only three missions were flown.

Chapman and Holmquest left the program in July 1972 due to the paucity of flight opportunities. England transferred to the United States Geological Survey in 1972 before rejoining the Astronaut Corps for a second nine-year stint in 1979. Allen also returned to active duty with the Astronaut Office in 1978 after a stint as director of Legislative Affairs at NASA Headquarters in Washington, D.C., returning one day before the Thirty-Five New Guys arrived in order to secure his seniority. Holmquest also requested permission to return in October 1979, but his request was denied. The requirement for scientists to be trained as jet pilots was lifted with the creation of the Mission Specialist position in the Space Shuttle program in 1978.

The seven remaining members of the Excess Eleven all went on to fly at least one Space Shuttle mission. Allen was the first, flying on STS-5 in Columbia in November 1982, fifteen years after he had been selected as an astronaut. Parker, Allen and Thornton flew two missions, and Musgrave ultimately flew six, the last being in 1996. He also carried out four extravehicular activities, totaling 26 hours and 19 minutes, and flew on all five Space Shuttles.
