= Robert F. Overmyer =

American astronaut (1936–1996)

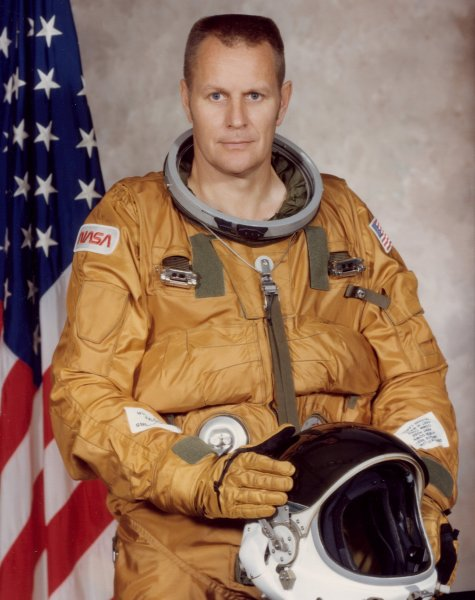
- Overmyer in his spacesuit in 1982
- Born: Robert Franklyn Overmyer; July 14, 1936; Lorain, Ohio, U.S.
- Died: March 22, 1996 (aged 59); Duluth, Minnesota, U.S.
- Resting place: Arlington National Cemetery
- Education: Westlake High School; Baldwin Wallace University (BS); Naval Postgraduate School (MS)
- Awards: Distinguished Flying Cross
- Space career

NASA astronaut
- Rank: Colonel, USMC
- Time in space: 12d 2h 22m
- Selection: USAF MOL Group 2 (1966); NASA Group 7 (1969)
- Missions: STS-5; STS-51-B
- Retired: June 1986

Robert Franklyn Overmyer (July 14, 1936 – March 22, 1996) was an American test pilot, naval aviator, aeronautical engineer, physicist, United States Marine Corps officer, and USAF/NASA astronaut. Overmyer was selected by the Air Force as an astronaut for its Manned Orbiting Laboratory in 1966. Upon cancellation of the program in 1969, he became a NASA astronaut and served support crew duties for the Apollo program, Skylab program, and Apollo–Soyuz Test Project. In 1976, he was assigned to the Space Shuttle program and flew as pilot on STS-5 in 1982 and as commander on STS-51-B in 1985. He was selected as a lead investigator into the Space Shuttle Challenger disaster in 1986, retiring from NASA that same year. A decade later, Overmyer died while testing the Cirrus VK-30 homebuilt aircraft.

== Early life and education ==
Overmyer was born on July 14, 1936, to Rolandus Overmyer (1906–1968) and Margaret June Overmyer (née Fabian; 1908–1979) in Lorain, Ohio, but considered Westlake, Ohio, his hometown. Overmyer was active in the Boy Scouts of America and earned the rank of First Class. He graduated from Westlake High School in 1954 and earned a Bachelor of Science degree in physics from Baldwin–Wallace College in 1958, and a Master of Science degree in aeronautics with a major in aeronautical engineering from the U.S. Naval Postgraduate School in 1964.

== Career ==
=== Marine Corps ===
Overmyer entered active duty with the Marine Corps in January 1958. After completing Navy flight training in Kingsville, Texas, he was assigned to VMA-214 in November 1959. He was assigned to the U.S. Naval Postgraduate School in 1962 to study aeronautical engineering. Upon completion of his graduate studies, he served one year with Marine Maintenance Squadron 17 at MCAS Iwakuni, Japan before being assigned to the U.S. Air Force Test Pilot School at Edwards Air Force Base, California. He was chosen as an astronaut for the Manned Orbiting Laboratory (MOL) program in 1966.

Overmyer logged over 7,500 flight hours, with over 6,000 in jet aircraft.

=== NASA ===
The MOL program was canceled in 1969 and Overmyer was selected as part of NASA Astronaut Group 7, where his first assignment was engineering development on the Skylab Program from 1969 to 1971. From 1971–72, he was a support crew member for Apollo 17 and was the launch capsule communicator (CAPCOM). From 1973–75, he was a support crew member for the Apollo–Soyuz Test Project and was the NASA CAPCOM in the mission control center in Moscow. In 1976, he was assigned duties on the space shuttle Approach and Landing Tests (ALT) program and was the prime T-38 Talon chase pilot for Orbiter Free-Flights 1 and 3. In 1979, he was assigned as the deputy vehicle manager of OV-102 (Columbia) in charge of finishing the manufacturing and tiling of Columbia at the Kennedy Space Center in preparation for its first flight. This assignment lasted until Columbia was transported to the launch pad in 1980.

==== Space Shuttle ====
===== STS-5 =====
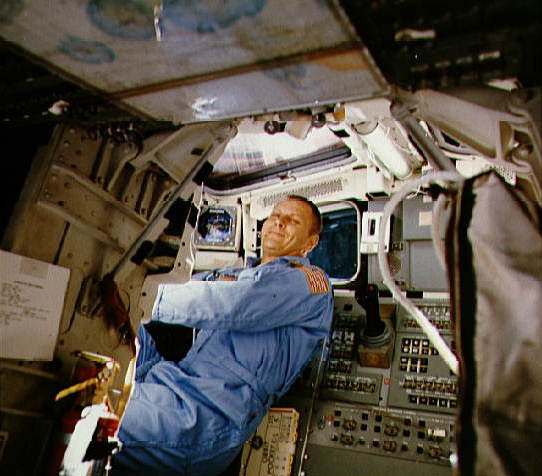
Overmyer on the flight deck of Space Shuttle Columbia during the STS-5 mission

Overmyer was the pilot for STS-5, the first fully operational flight of the shuttle program, which launched from Kennedy Space Center, Florida, on November 11, 1982. He was accompanied by spacecraft commander Vance D. Brand and two mission specialists, Joseph P. Allen and William B. Lenoir. STS-5, the first mission with a four-man crew, clearly demonstrated the shuttle as fully operational by the successful first deployment of two commercial communications satellites from the orbiter's payload bay. The mission marked the first use of the Payload Assist Module (PAM-D) and its new ejection system. Numerous flight tests were performed throughout the mission to document shuttle performance during launch, boost, orbit, atmospheric entry and landing phases. STS-5 was the last flight to carry the Development Flight Instrumentation (DFI) package to support flight testing. A Getaway Special, three Student Involvement Projects and medical experiments were also included on the mission. The STS-5 crew successfully concluded the five-day orbital flight of Columbia with the first entry and landing through a cloud deck to a hard-surface runway and demonstrated maximum braking. Mission duration was 122 hours before landing on a concrete runway at Edwards Air Force Base, California, on November 16, 1982.

===== STS-51-B =====
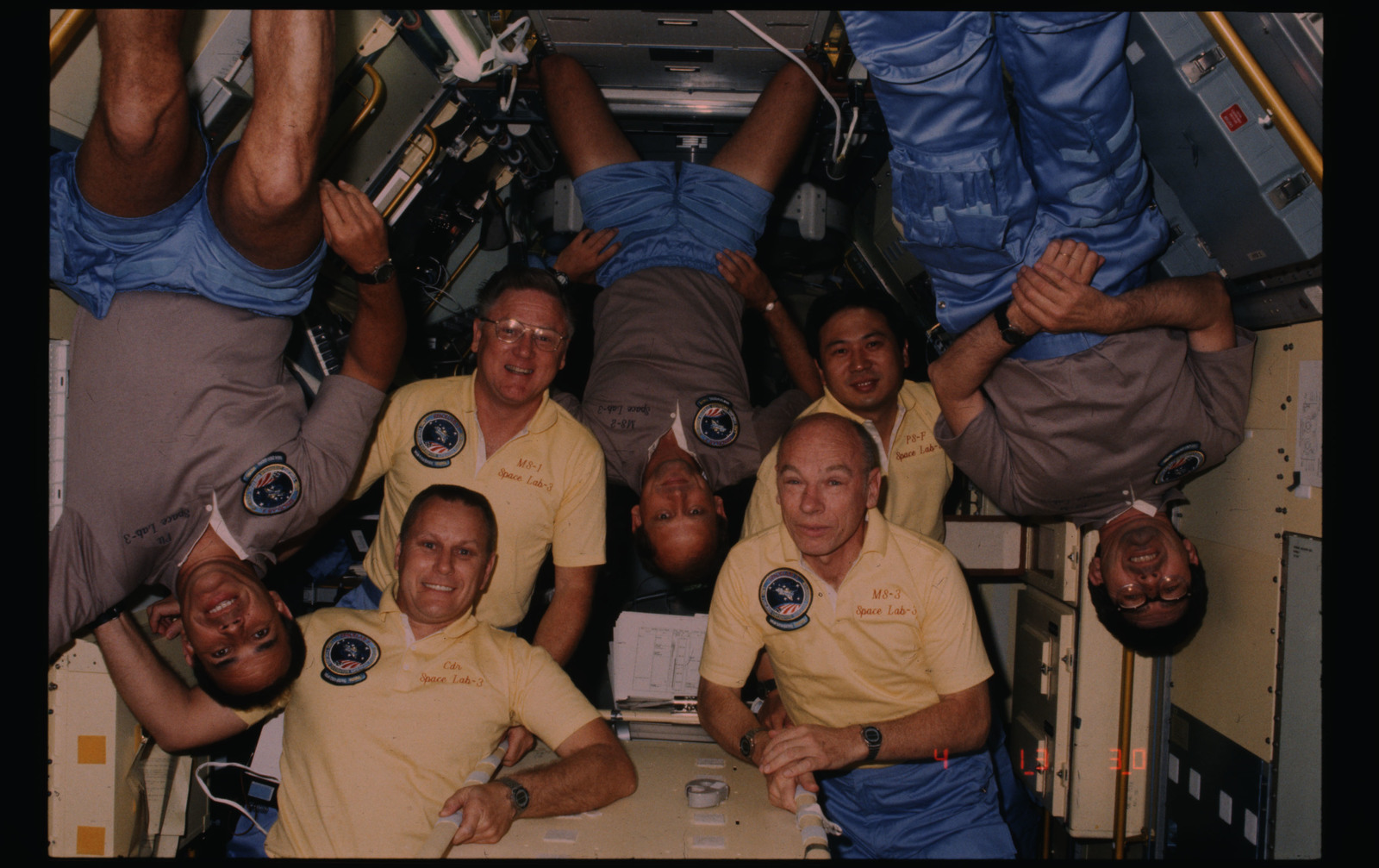
Overmyer, second from left, with fellow crew members of STS-51-B

Overmyer was the commander of STS-51-B, the Spacelab-3 (SL-3) mission. He commanded a crew of four astronauts and two payload specialists conducting a broad range of scientific experiments from space physics to the suitability of animal holding facilities. STS-51-B was also the first shuttle flight to launch a small payload from a "Getaway Special" canister. STS-51-B launched at 12:02 p.m. EDT on April 29, 1985, from Kennedy Space Center, Florida, and landed at Edwards Air Force Base, California, at 9:11 a.m. PDT on May 6, 1985. STS-51-B completed 110 orbits of Earth at an altitude of 190 nautical miles.

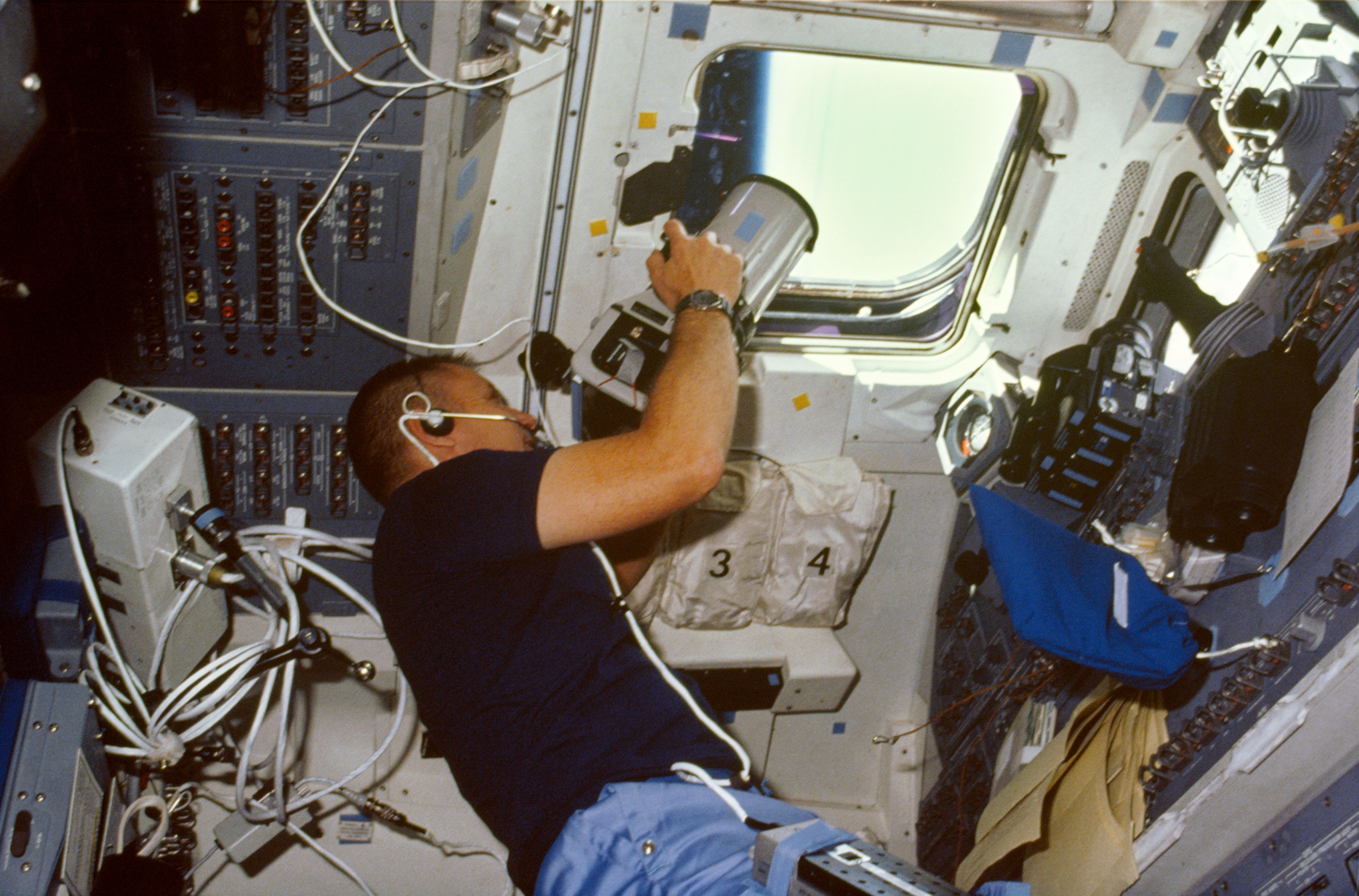
Overmyer aiming a camera out of an overhead window of Space Shuttle Challenger during the STS-51-B mission

In 1986, Overmyer was involved in the recovery of the Challenger disaster crew remains and was also one of NASA's lead investigators into the incident.

Overmyer retired from NASA and the Marine Corps in May 1986.

=== Post NASA ===
After retiring from the space industry, Overmyer commenced his own consulting business, Mach Twenty Five International, Inc. He consulted with major aerospace corporations and the National Broadcasting Corporation (NBC) as well as writing a column for the British magazine Space Flight News. In March 1988, he joined the Space Station Team at McDonnell Douglas Aerospace, where he led crew and operations activities for seven years. He retired from McDonnell Douglas in April 1995 and expanded the scope of Mach Twenty Five International, continuing his aerospace consultation work as well as speaking engagements and writing.

==== Test pilot ====
Overmyer continued his career as a general aviation test pilot. Having former experience with aeronautical testing at both U.S. Air Force Test Pilot School and NASA, he joined Duluth, Minnesota-based aircraft manufacturer Cirrus Design (now called Cirrus Aircraft) as a test pilot in November 1995. He contributed to stall testing of the company's first design, the Cirrus VK-30 kit aircraft, which first flew in 1988. He also performed early certification testing for the Cirrus SR20, which was certified in 1998 and helped pioneer the use of glass cockpits, composite materials and ballistic parachutes in the light production aircraft industry.

== Death and family ==
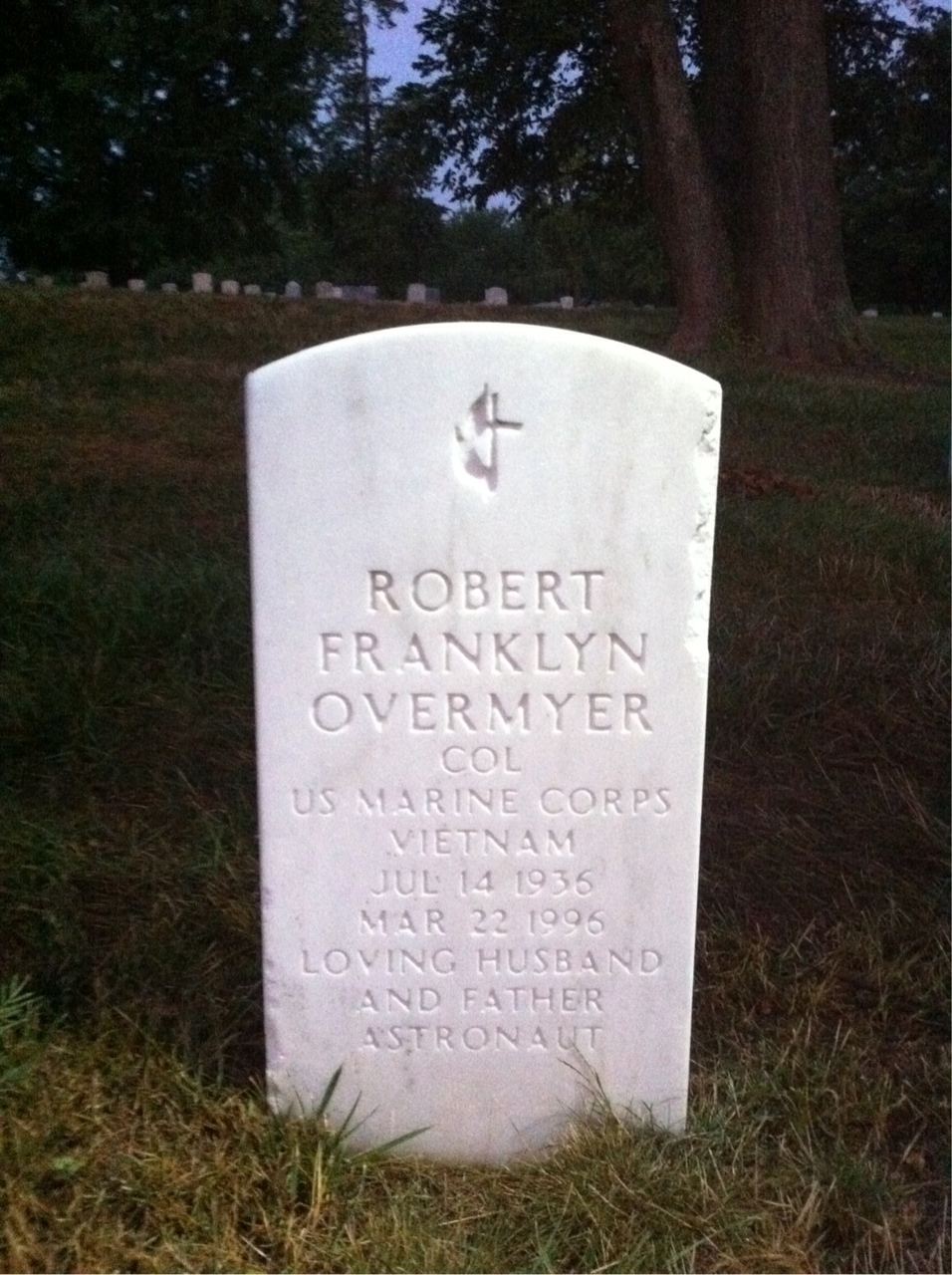
Grave of Robert Overmyer at Arlington National Cemetery

Overmyer died in a plane crash on March 22, 1996, near the Duluth International Airport while testing the VK-30. He was testing the plane's wing for full-flap stall recovery characteristics at aft center of gravity limits when the aircraft departed controlled flight. He was interred at Arlington National Cemetery and is survived by his wife, Katherine, and three children: Carolyn Marie (born 1966), Patricia Ann (born 1968), and Robert Rolandus (born 1970).

== Organizations and honors ==
Overmyer was a member of the Society of Experimental Test Pilots, Experimental Aircraft Association, and Aircraft Owners and Pilots Association.

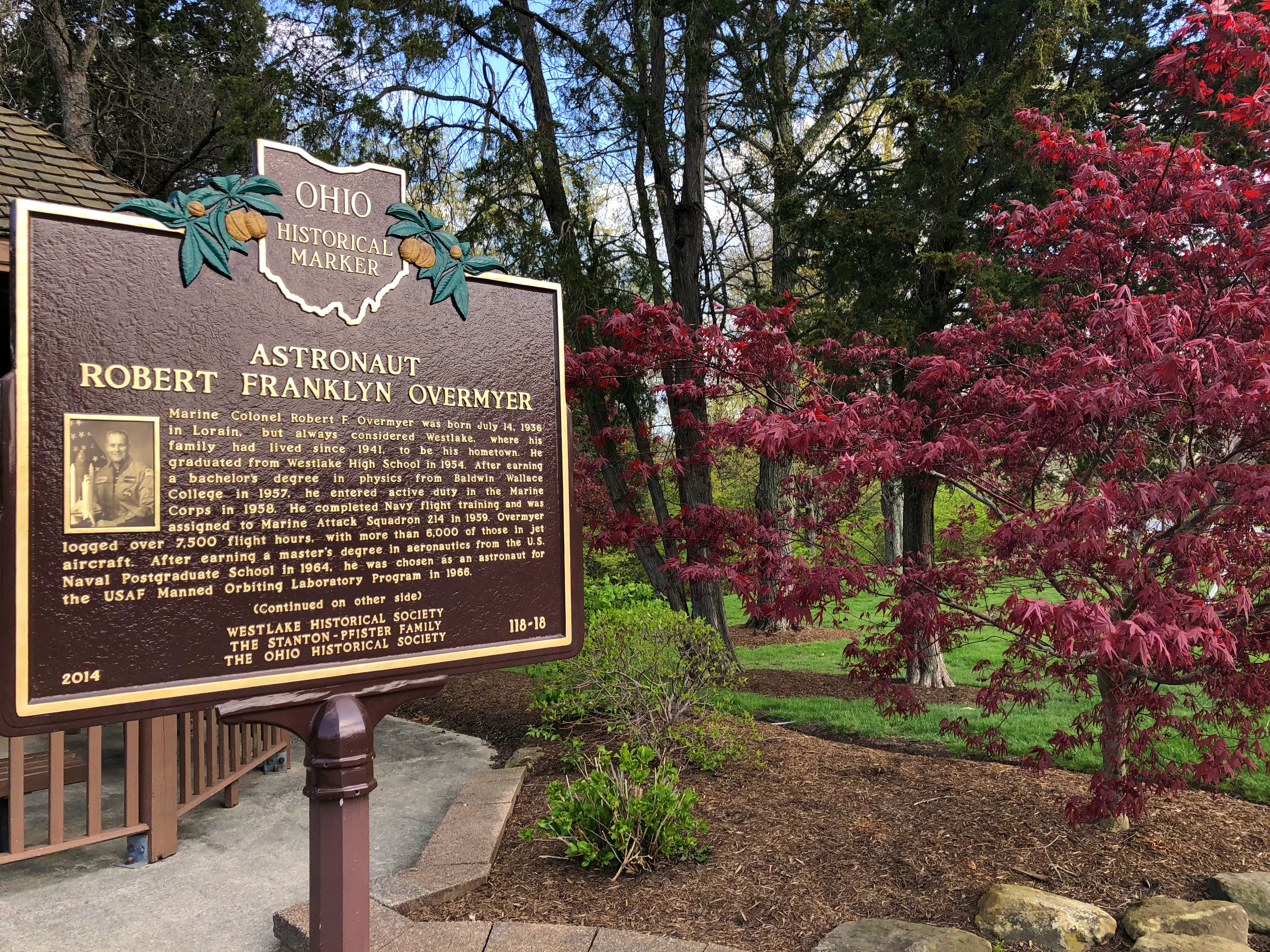
Robert F. Overmyer Ohio Historical Marker (front)

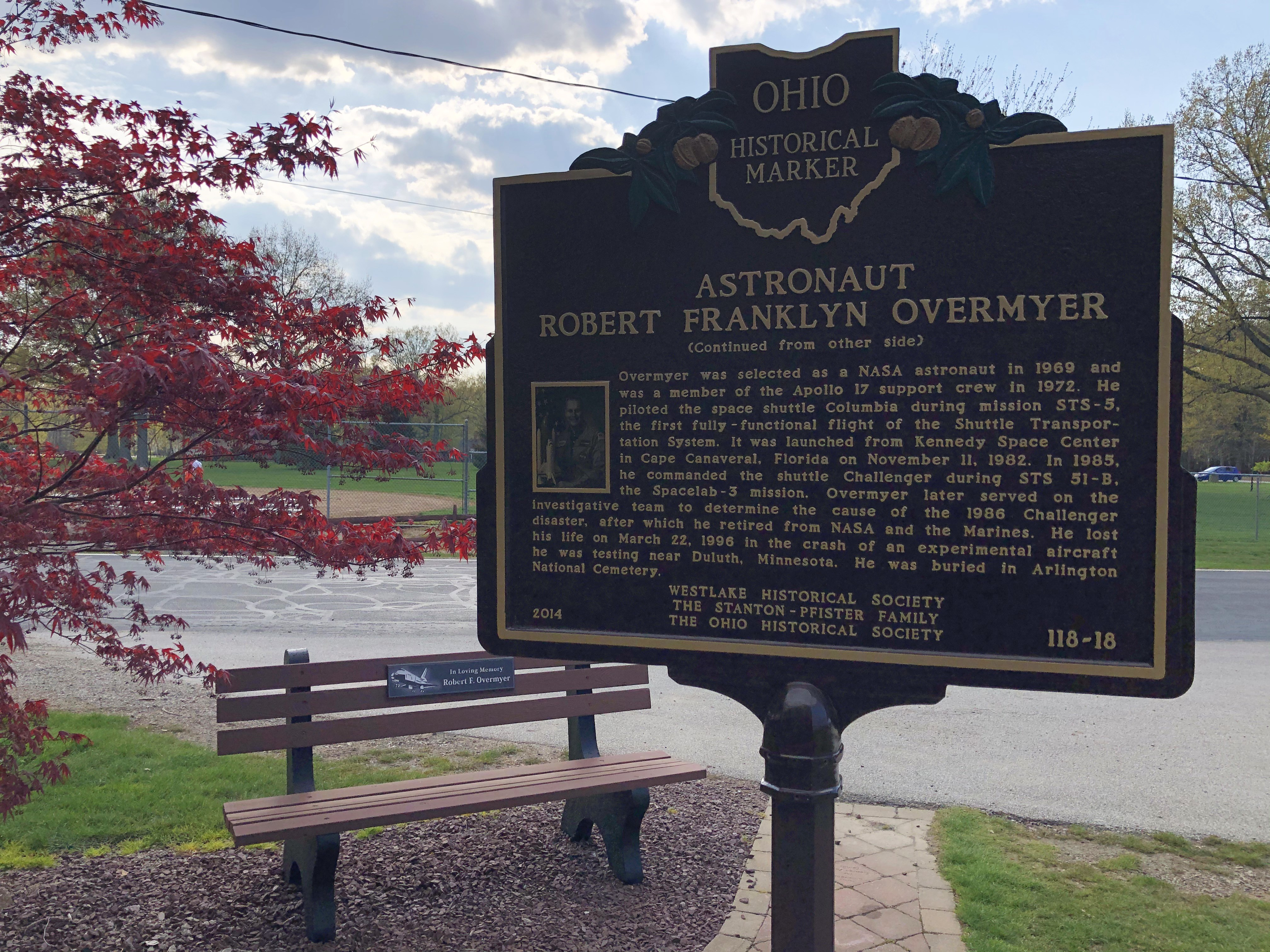
Robert F. Overmyer Ohio Historical Marker (back)

He was awarded the Air Force Meritorious Service Medal in 1969 for duties with the USAF Manned Orbiting Laboratory program; the Marine Corps Meritorious Service Medal in 1978 for duties as the chief chase pilot and support crewman for the Shuttle Approach and Landing Test Program; an Honorary Doctor of Philosophy degree from Baldwin–Wallace College, December 1982; the U.S. Naval Postgraduate School Distinguished Engineers Award in January 1983; the Distinguished Flying Cross (1983); and the NASA Space Flight Medal (1983).

There is an Ohio Historical Marker in Clague Park, Westlake, Ohio, commemorating his life and career.

== See also ==
- List of spaceflight records
