= Spacecraft Systems and Controls Lab =

The Space Systems and Control Lab (SSCL), is a laboratory based at Iowa State University (ISU) in Ames, IA. SSCL focuses on space systems and has a massive number of independent projects. Within its department, the SSCL also has an AABL Wind and Gust Tunnel, Anechoic Chamber, Icing Tunnel, Neutral Buoyancy Tank, Rotational Diamond Anvil Cell, and a Tornado Simulator.

== History ==
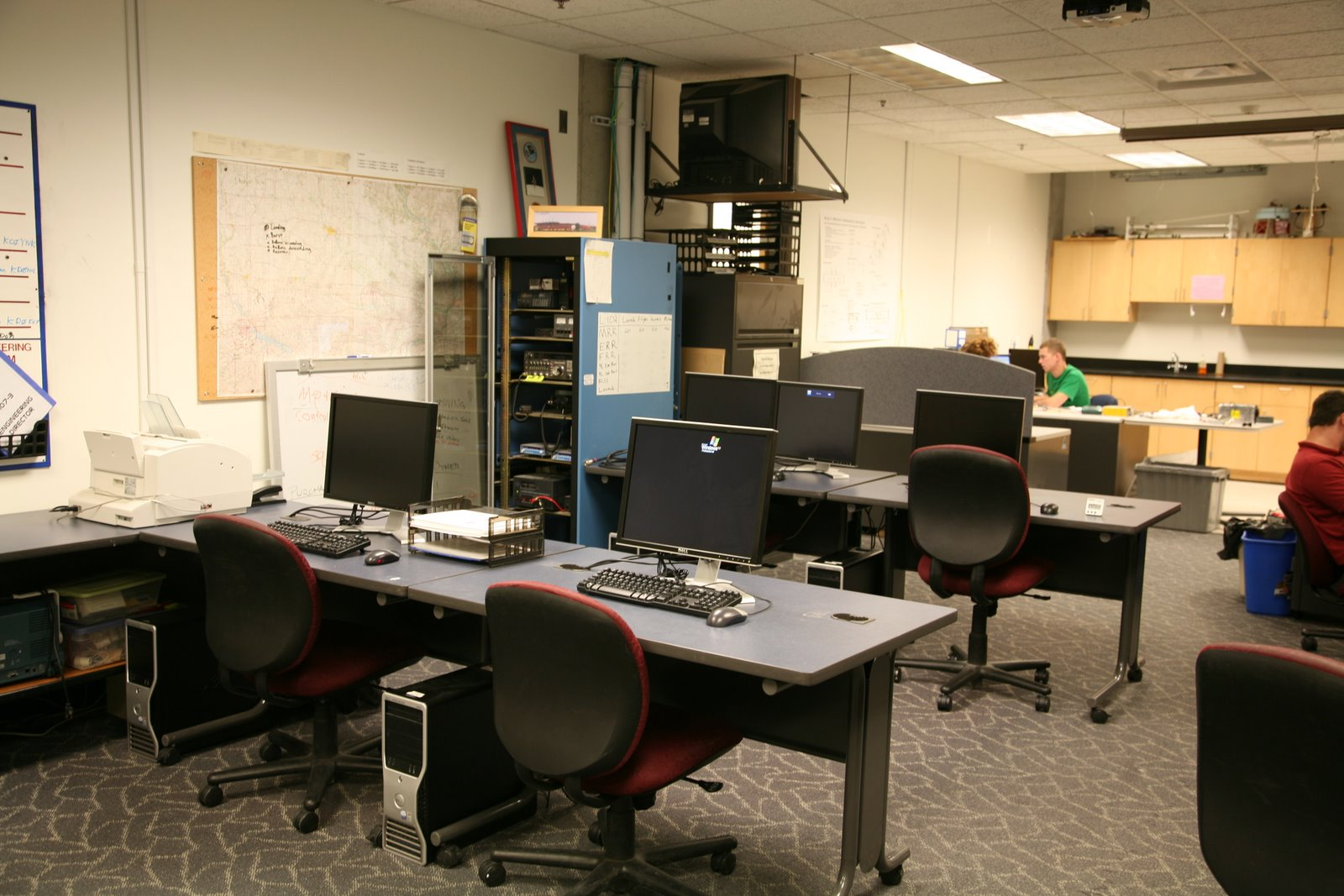
Mission Control area for HABET Flights

In 2007, the SSCL was changed to the Space Systems and Controls Lab as new leadership took over, and to reflect some of the changes the lab had undergone. The SSCL continues with a focus in space systems and has expanded to several new areas. The SSCL still has a strong emphasis on student involvement with both projects and leadership of the lab. Currently, the lab has 4 core projects, two active research projects, several capstone projects and well over 50 students from Electrical, Aerospace, and Mechanical Engineering, as well as students outside the College of Engineering. The lab is managed by Matthew Nelson, a staff member within the Aerospace Engineering department and the Director of Engineering and Operations for the lab. Funding for the lab is provided by the Aerospace Engineering Department, research grants, and private donations.

== Projects ==
The SSCL has several core projects that are ongoing from year to year. In addition to these projects, the SSCL has had numerous capstone and independent projects led by students in the lab.

=== HABET ===
The longest running project at the SSCL is the High Altitude Balloon Experiments in Technology (HABET) program. This program has students design, build and fly spacecraft to the edge of Earth's atmosphere and back to earth. The HABET team has flown over 130 flights with experiments including micro gravity, worms, collection of atmospheric data, and high quality images and videos. The team obtained an altitude record of 121,793 feet (ASL), flown payloads up to 50lbs, and have continually been developing new techniques and hardware for High Altitude Balloons.

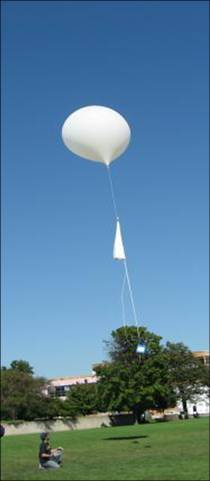
HABET Flight Stack

=== IJEMS ===
The ISAT project was never fully funded. In September 1994, an opportunity to fly an experiment aboard the space shuttle was presented. One of the original experiments for the ISAT project was incorporated into a design to be flown aboard the space shuttle in a project called the Iowa Joint Experiment in Microgravity Solidification (IJEMS). The project involved many institutions, including Iowa State University (ISU), the University of Iowa, the Ames Laboratory, the Institute for Physical Research and Technology, Rockwell International, and Space Industries Incorporated. In September 1995, the project was successfully flown on board STS-69.

IJEMS had the following attributes:

- Microprocessor: 33 MHz 486SLC
- Storage Media: 3MB Flash memory formatted with FAT for executable and data storage
- Operating system: DOS
- Thermocouples quantity: 32
- Solid state relays quantity: 24
- Programming language: C++
- Hosted experiments quantity: 4
- Available power: 20A @ 28V
- Pre-flight acceleration testing: 9G
- Smart Can pressure regulation: 1/2 ATM
