= Anthony Llewellyn =

American scientist and astronaut (1933–2013)

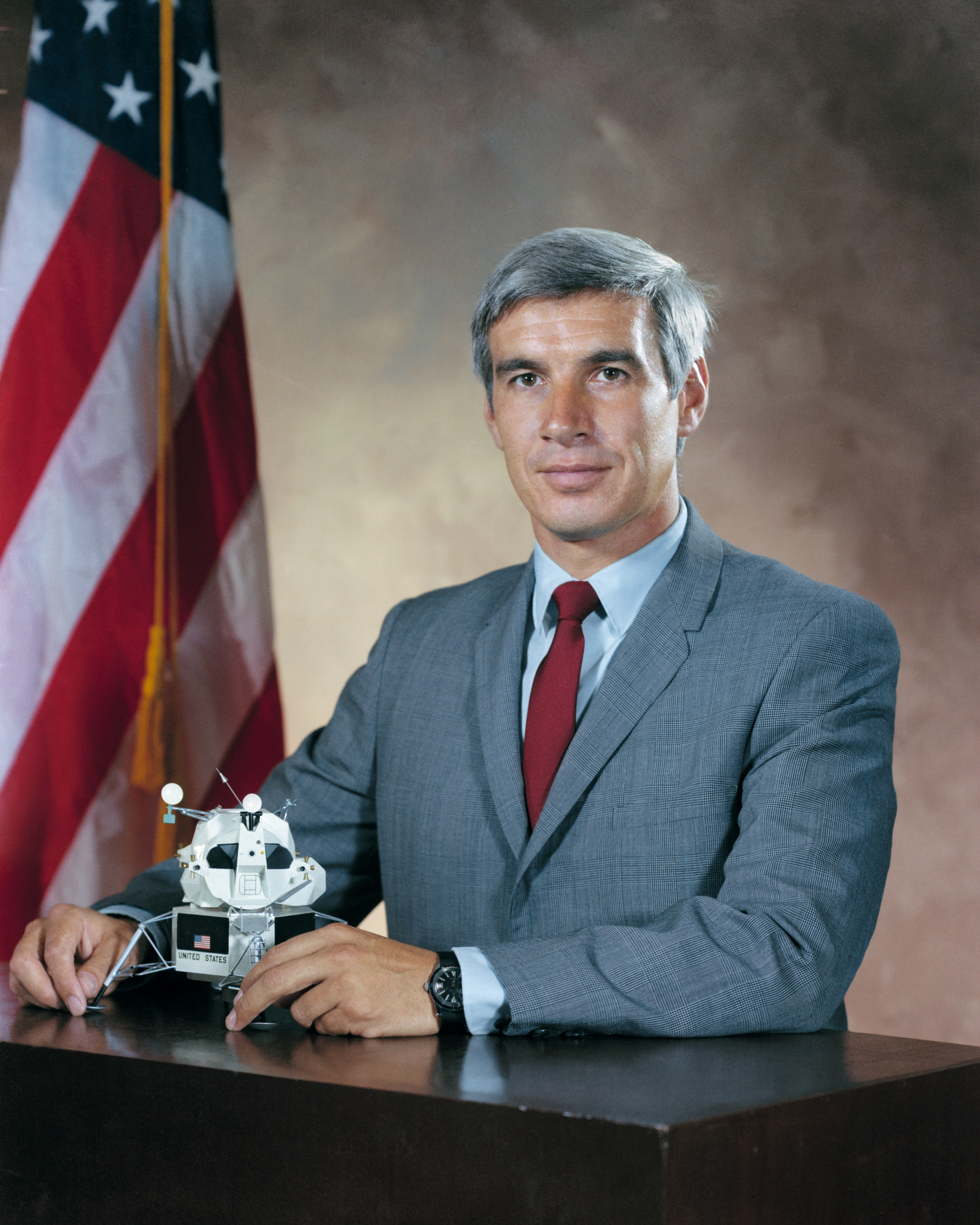
- Born: John Anthony Llewellyn; 22 April 1933; Cardiff, Wales, U.K
- Died: 2 July 2013 (aged 80); Madeira Beach, Florida, U.S.
- Education: Cardiff University (BS, MS, PhD)
- Space career

NASA astronaut candidate
- Selection: NASA Group 6 (1967)

John Anthony Llewellyn (22 April 1933 – 2 July 2013) was a Welsh chemist and a NOAA aquanaut. In August 1967, Llewellyn was one of only two non-American astronaut candidates selected by NASA as part of NASA Astronaut Group 6.

== Biography ==
Llewellyn was born in Cardiff, Wales, and graduated from Cardiff High School in 1949. He received his BSc degree from University College, Cardiff in 1955 and went on to achieve his PhD in chemistry in 1958. He married Valerie Mya Davies-Jones; they had three children.

== Early career ==
After the award of his doctorate, Llewellyn moved to Ottawa, Ontario, Canada, as a post-doctoral fellow at the National Research Council. In 1960, he went to Florida State University as a research associate in the Chemistry Department and was subsequently appointed assistant professor. In 1964, he was jointly appointed associate professor in the School of Engineering Science and the Department of Chemistry.

== Diving ==
Having been taught to dive by Jacques Cousteau, Llewellyn served as training director for Florida State University's diver training program. This was one of the first scuba diving certification programs in the United States. Among those he certified was sixteen year old E. Lee Spence, who received his certification on 10 July 1964. Spence went on to become one of the pioneers of underwater archaeology. Llewellyn's diving gave him experience in the feeling of weightlessness, which helped prepare him for his later training as an astronaut.

== NASA selection ==
Llewellyn was selected as a scientist-astronaut by NASA in August 1967, one of two non-US citizens selected. He participated in flight training as part of NASA Astronaut Group 6; however, he dropped out of flight school and resigned from NASA in September 1968. Llewellyn needed to learn to fly jets, and was not able to fly the jet with the cockpit blacked out.

== Post-NASA career ==
In 1971, Llewellyn joined the National Oceanic and Atmospheric Administration, where for almost five years he was one of the four-person crew of Hydrolab, on the ocean floor in the Bahamas.

From 1971, Llewellyn was a full professor in the Department of Chemical Engineering at the University of South Florida, where he also served as Director of the College of Engineering's computing department, and later as University Director of Academic Computing, helping to initiate the university's courses in High-Performance Computing and electronic and distance learning. He retired from the directorship in 2007 and was Professor Emeritus in the Department of Chemical and Biomedical Engineering until his death. His research interests included methods of drug and gene delivery. His then current work was presented at the 2010 American Society for Gene and Cell Therapy and he was an invited session leader at the 2010 Gordon Conference in Bioelectrochemistry.

== Death ==
Llewellyn died on 2 July 2013 following a stroke.
