= SBS 3 (satellite) =

Satellite Launched on STS-5

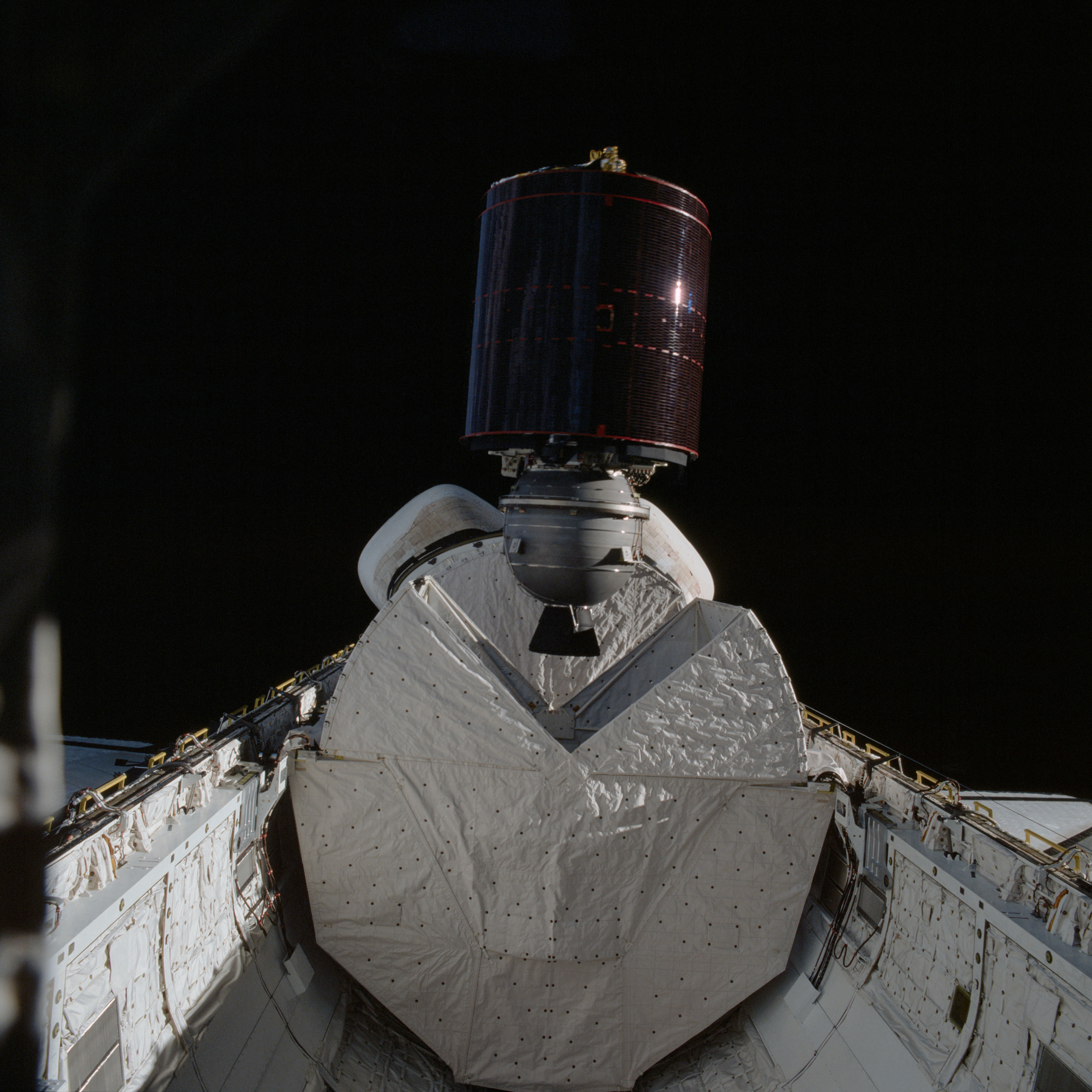
- SBS 3 with PAM-D stage
- Mission type: Communications
- Operator: SBS
- COSPAR ID: 1982-110B
- SATCAT no.: 13651
- Mission duration: 12 years, 6 months and 21 days (achieved); 43 years, 7 months, 19 days (in orbit)

Spacecraft properties
- Bus: HS-376
- Manufacturer: Hughes Space and Communications
- Launch mass: 1,117 kilograms (2,463 lb)

Start of mission
- Launch date: 11 November 1982, 12:19 UTC
- Rocket: Space Shuttle Columbia STS-5
- Launch site: Kennedy LC-39A
- Contractor: NASA

End of mission
- Disposal: Decommissioned
- Deactivated: June 02, 1995

Orbital parameters
- Reference system: Geocentric
- Regime: Geostationary
- Longitude: 94° W
- Eccentricity: 0.73391
- Perigee altitude: 294 kilometres (183 mi)
- Apogee altitude: 37,127 kilometres (23,070 mi)
- Inclination: 23.7°
- Period: 659.1 minutes
- Epoch: November 11, 1982

Transponders
- Band: 14 Ku band

SBS 3 was a geostationary communications satellite designed and manufactured by Hughes (now Boeing) on the HS-376 platform. It was ordered by Satellite Business Systems, which later sold it to Hughes Communications. It had a K_{u} band payload and operated on the 94°W longitude.

== Satellite description ==
The spacecraft was designed and manufactured by Hughes on the HS-376 satellite bus. It had a launch mass of 1,117 kg (2,463 lb), a geostationary orbit and a 7-year design life.

== History ==
On November 11, 1982, SBS 3 was finally launched by a Space Shuttle Columbia in the mission STS-5 from Kennedy Space Center at 12:19 UTC. The satellite was launched along with the Canadian communications satellite Anik C3.

On 2 June 1995, SBS 3 was finally decommissioned and put on a graveyard orbit.

== See also ==
- 1982 in spaceflight
