= Brian O'Leary =

American astronaut (1940–2011)

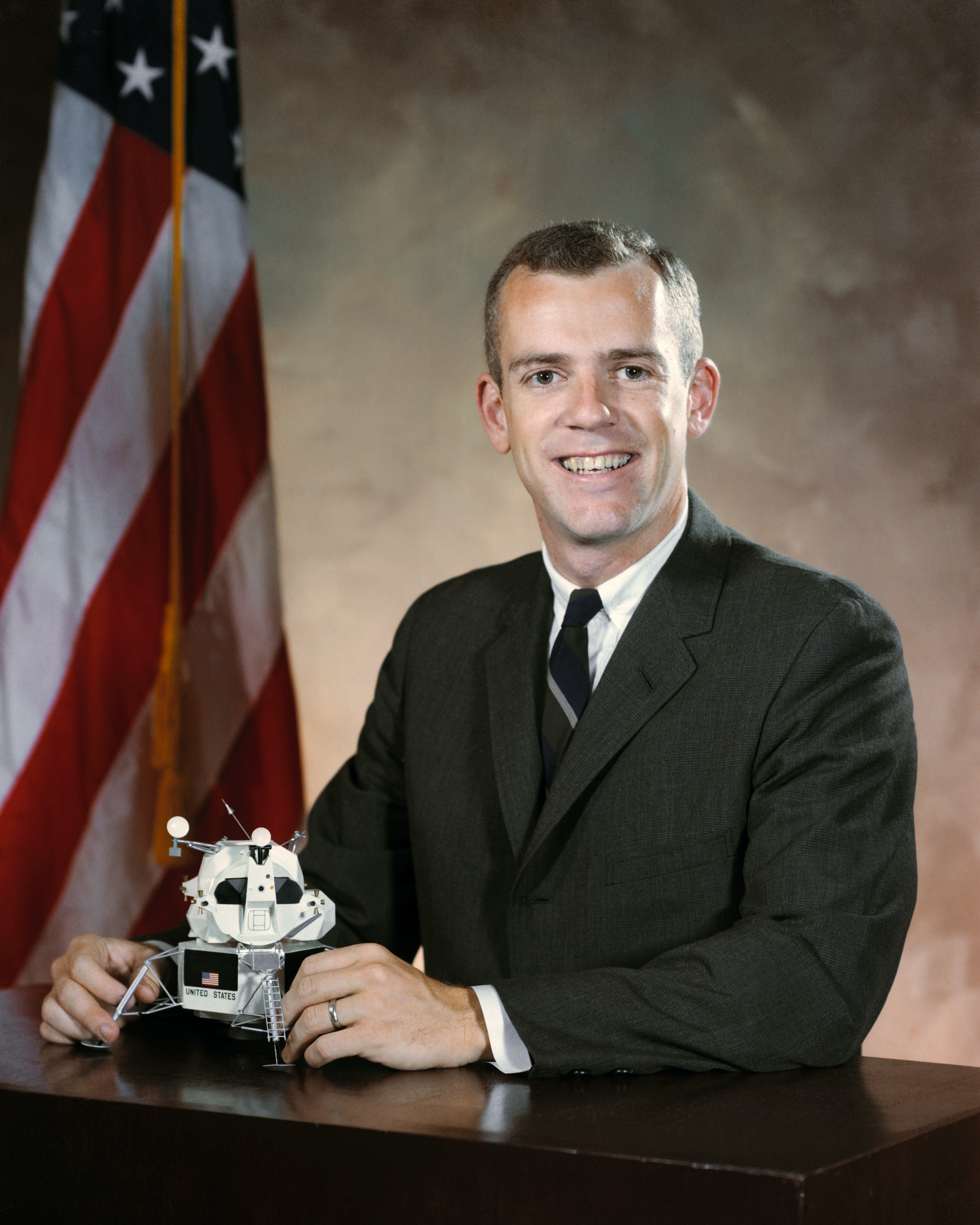
- Born: Brian Todd O'Leary; January 27, 1940; Boston, Massachusetts, U.S.
- Died: July 28, 2011 (aged 71); Vilcabamba, Ecuador
- Education: Williams College (BS); Georgetown University (MS); University of California, Berkeley (PhD)
- Space career

NASA astronaut
- Selection: NASA Astronaut Group 6 1967
- Retired: April 23, 1968
- Scientific career
- Fields: Astronomy
- Thesis: Mars: Visible and Near Infrared Studies and the Composition of the Surface (1967)

Brian Todd O'Leary (January 27, 1940 – July 28, 2011) was an American scientist, author, and NASA astronaut candidate. He was part of NASA Astronaut Group 6, a group of scientist-astronauts chosen with the intention of training for the Apollo Applications Program.

== Personal ==
O'Leary was born and raised in Boston, Massachusetts on January 27, 1940. He decided to become an astronaut after visiting Washington, D.C. as a teenager. On December 1, 1983, O'Leary was married to Delores Marie Lefkowitz, also known as Dee Davenport, in Yarmouth, Massachusetts.

== Education ==
O'Leary graduated from Belmont High School in 1957. He received a B.A. in physics from Williams College in 1961, an M.A. in astronomy from Georgetown University in 1964, and a Ph.D. in astronomy from the University of California, Berkeley in 1967.

== Organizations ==
O'Leary became a Fellow of the American Association for the Advancement of Science in 1975. From 1970 to 1976, he was the secretary of the American Geophysical Union's Planetology Section. In 1977, he worked on Asteroidal Resources Group, NASA Ames Summer Study on Space Settlements as team leader.

== Astronaut program ==
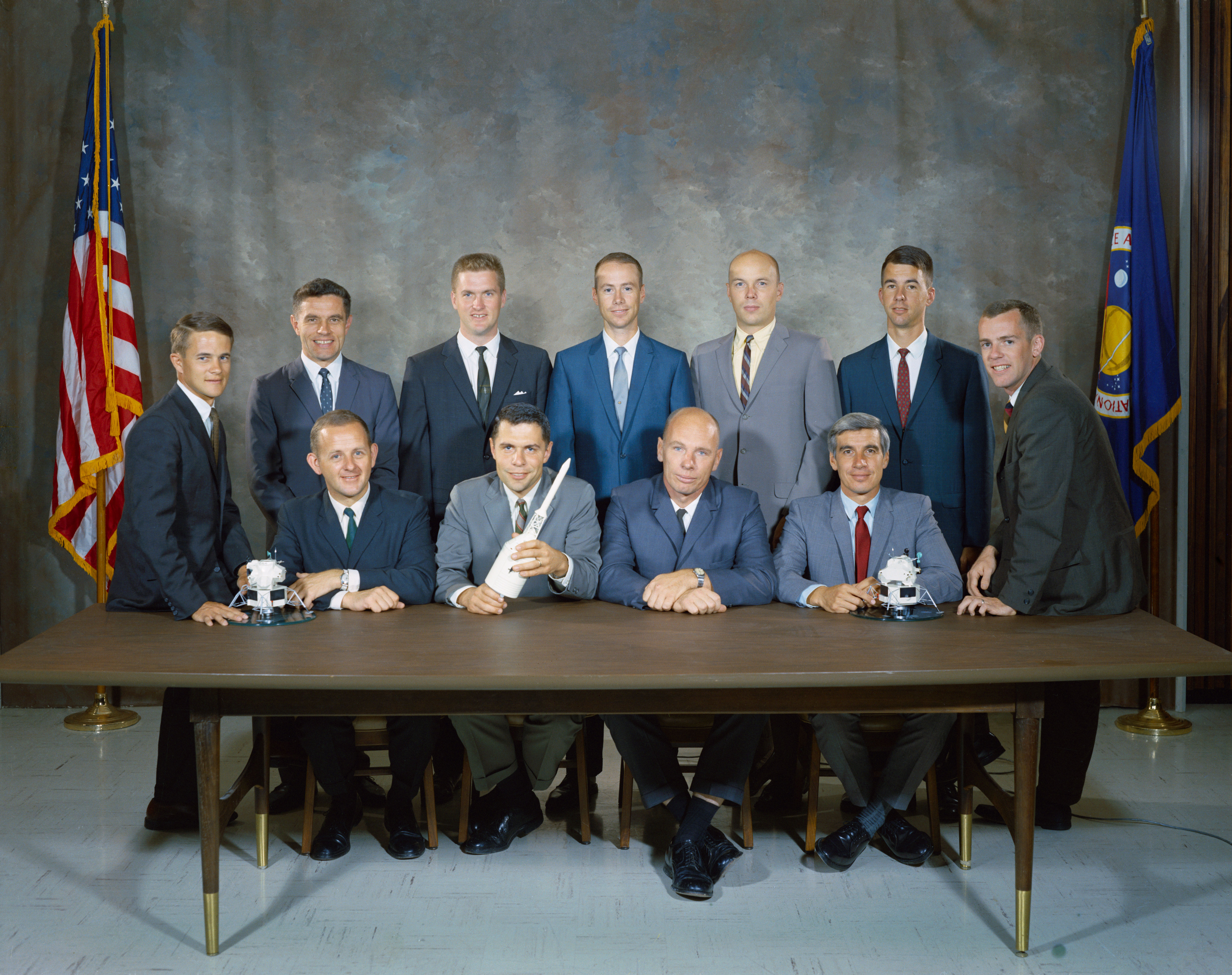
The members of NASA Astronaut Group 6. O'Leary is at the far right.

During his graduate studies at the University of California, Berkeley, O'Leary published several scientific papers on the atmosphere of Mars. O'Leary's Ph.D. thesis in 1967 was on the Martian surface. Because of his professional specialty and youth, O'Leary was selected as an astronaut in conjunction with a possible NASA human mission to Mars then envisaged for the 1980s contingent on post-Apollo funding. O'Leary was the only planetary scientist in the NASA Astronaut Corps during the Apollo program. In April 1968, O'Leary resigned from the Astronaut Corps prior to completing the training program.

== Academic career ==
After O'Leary's resignation from NASA, Carl Sagan invited him to lecture at Cornell University in 1968, where he stayed until 1971 as a research associate (1968–1969) and assistant professor (1969–1971) of astronomy. While at Cornell, he studied lunar mascons. During the 1970–1971 academic year, O'Leary was deputy team leader of the Mariner 10 Venus-Mercury TV Science Team as a visiting researcher at the California Institute of Technology. The team received NASA's group achievement award for its participation. He later taught at San Francisco State University (associate professor of astronomy and interdisciplinary sciences; 1971–1972), the UC Berkeley School of Law (visiting associate professor; 1971–1972), Hampshire College (assistant professor of astronomy and science policy assessment; 1972–1975), Princeton University (research staff and lecturer in physics; 1976–1981) and California State University, Long Beach (visiting lecturer in physics; 1986–1987).

At Princeton, he was involved with Gerard K. O'Neill and the L5 Society's orbiting city plans. He suggested that passing asteroids and the moons of Mars would be the easiest to access resources for space colonies.

O'Leary wrote and edited books on astronomy and astronautics.

== Political activities ==
O'Leary became politically active early in his career and participated in a demonstration in Washington, D.C. in 1970, to protest the Cambodian Campaign. Richard Nixon administration officials invited O'Leary and his fellow Cornell professors to present their views. In 1975 and 1976, he worked on Morris Udall's presidential campaign as an energy advisor, as well as for the U.S. House Interior Committee subcommittee on energy and the environment as Udall's special staff consultant on energy. O'Leary worked for U.S. presidential candidates Jesse Jackson, Dennis Kucinich, George McGovern, and Walter Mondale.

During those years, he wrote about the Space Shuttle, NASA's lunar landings, and the weaponization of space. O'Leary traveled to the Soviet Union twice in the late 1980s with the aim of promoting peaceful space exploration, including a peace cruise along the Dnieper River.

== Frontiers of science ==
A remote viewing experience in 1979 and a near-death experience in 1982 initiated O'Leary's departure from orthodox science. After Princeton, O'Leary worked at Science Applications International Corporation. He refused to work on military space applications, for which reason he lost his position there in 1987. Beginning in 1987, O'Leary increasingly explored unorthodox ideas, particularly the relationship between consciousness and science, and became widely known for his writings on "the frontiers of science, space, energy and culture".

Since the 1980s, he lectured at the Findhorn Foundation, Esalen Institute, Omega Institute for Holistic Studies, Unity Churches, Religious Science churches and Sivananda Yoga Vedanta Centres.

With artist Meredith Miller, his third wife and widow, he co-founded the Montesueños Eco-Retreat in Vilcabamba, Ecuador in 2008, which is devoted to "peace, sustainability, the arts and new science".

== Death ==
O'Leary contracted skin cancer in his 60s, which he treated with an alternative methodology involving a substance called Cansema. After surviving his second heart attack (precipitated by an ayahuasca ceremony) in 2010, he died of intestinal cancer on July 28, 2011, soon after diagnosis, at his home in Vilcabamba.

== Publications ==
- The Making of an Ex-Astronaut 1970. ISBN 0671772856.
- The Fertile Stars 1981. ISBN 089696079X.
- Project Space Station 1983. ISBN 0811717011.
- Mars 1999 1987. ISBN 0811709825.
- Exploring Inner & Outer Space 1989. ISBN 155643068X.
- The Second Coming of Science 1993. ISBN 155643152X.
- Miracle in the Void: Free Energy, UFOs and Other Scientific Revelations 1996. ISBN 096478260X.
- Reinheriting the Earth 2003. ISBN 0939040379.
- The Energy Solution Revolution 2009. ISBN 0979917646.
