= Joseph P. Allen =

American astronaut (born 1937)

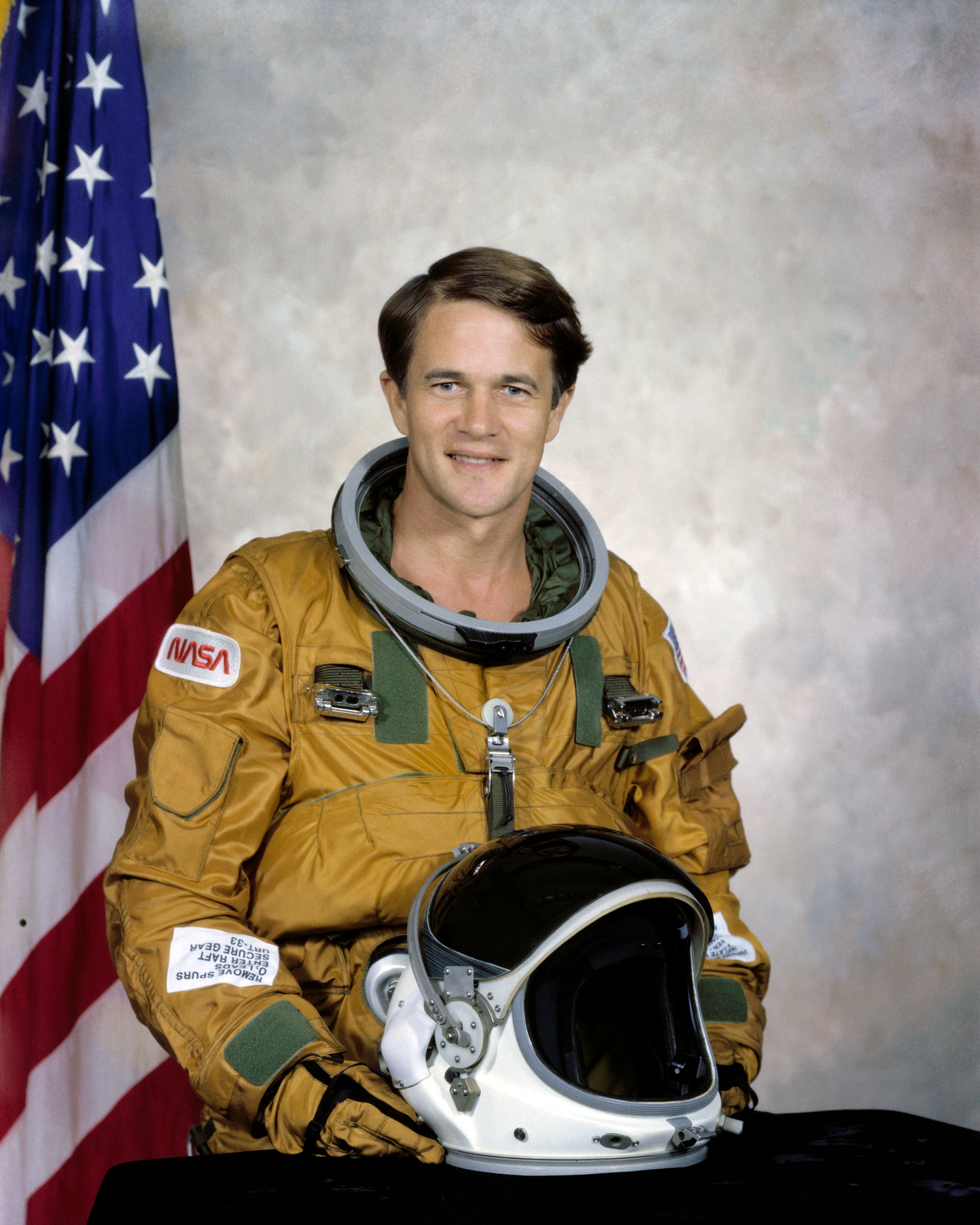
- Born: Joseph Percival Allen IV; June 27, 1937 (age 89); Crawfordsville, Indiana, U.S.
- Education: DePauw University (BA); Yale University (MS, PhD)
- Space career

NASA astronaut
- Time in space: 13d 1h 58m
- Selection: NASA Group 6 (1967)
- Total EVAs: 2
- Total EVA time: 11h, 42m
- Missions: STS-5; STS-51-A
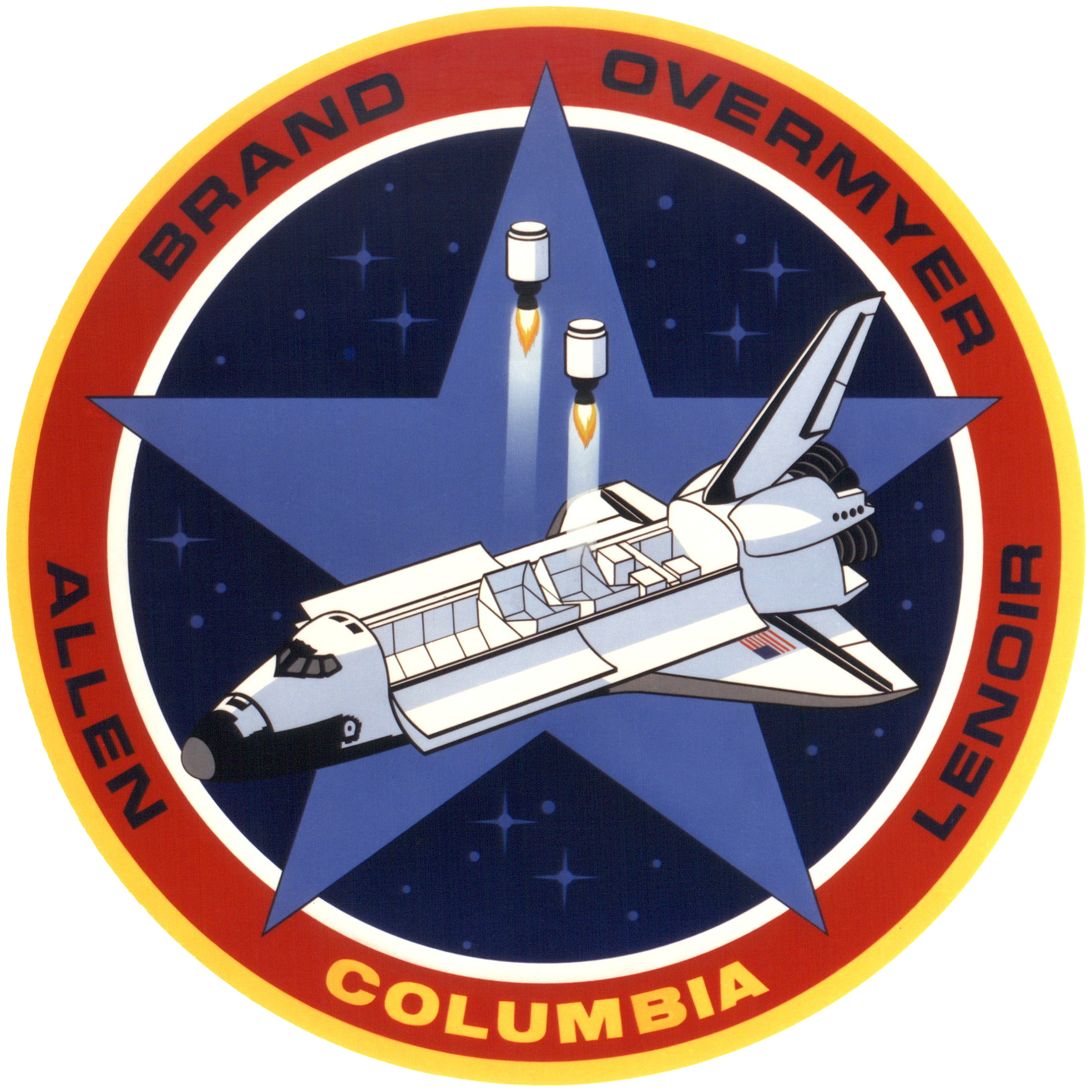
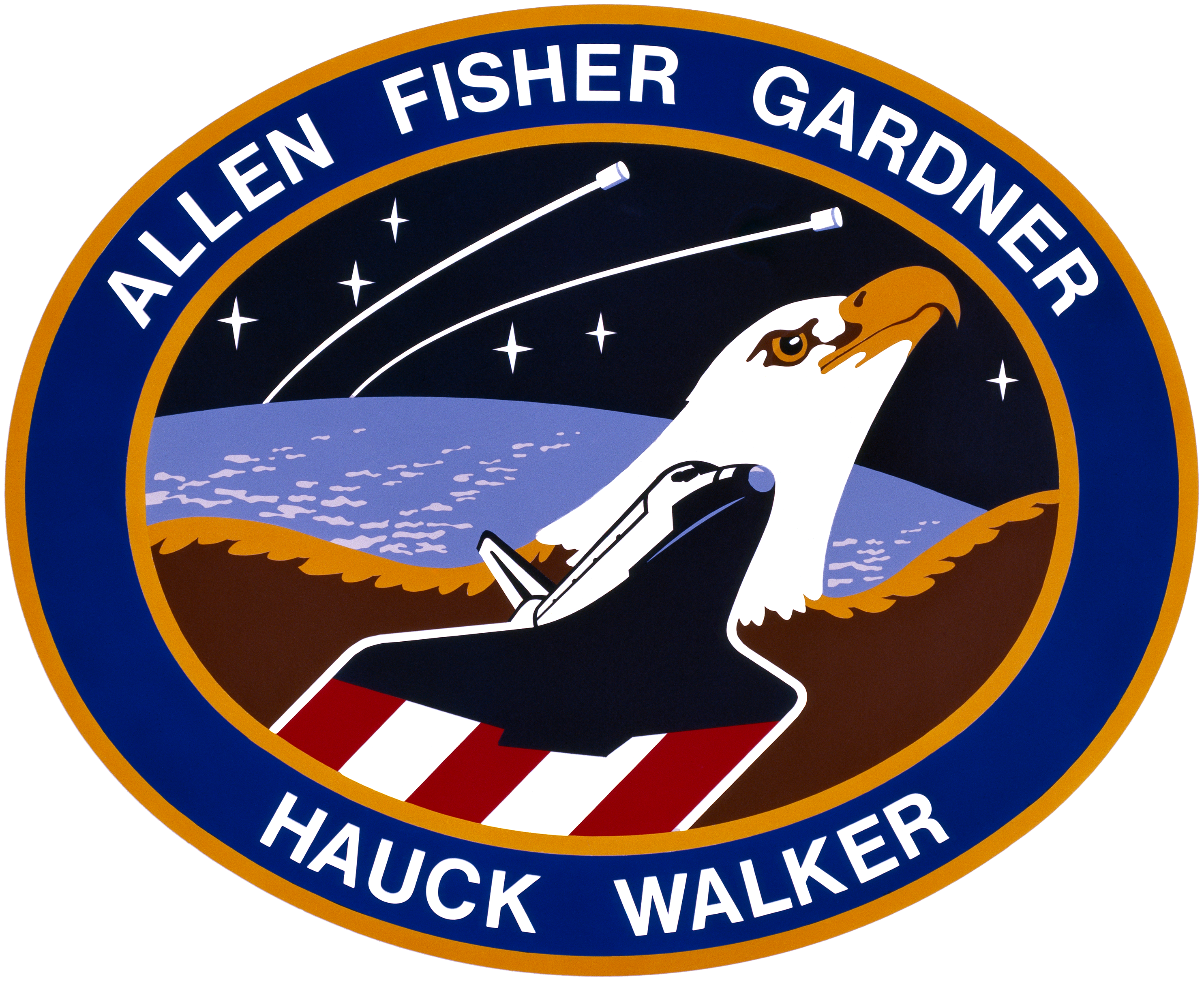
- Mission insignia
- Retired: July 1, 1985
- Scientific career
- Fields: Particle physics
- Workplaces: University of Washington; Yale University; Brookhaven National Laboratory
- Thesis: Studies of Odd-A Nuclei in the 2S-1D Shell (1965)
- Doctoral advisor: D. Allan Bromley

Joseph Percival Allen IV (born June 27, 1937) is an American former NASA astronaut. He logged more than 3,000 hours flying time in jet aircraft.

== Early life and education ==
Allen was born in Crawfordsville, Indiana, in June 1937. His parents, Mr. and Mrs. Joseph P. Allen III, had resided in Frankfort, Indiana. He attended Mills School, and is a graduate of Crawfordsville High School in Indiana, Class of 1955; received a Bachelor of Arts degree in Mathematics and Physics from DePauw University in 1959, where he was a member of Delta chapter of Beta Theta Pi, and Master of Science and PhD degrees in Physics from Yale University in 1961 and 1965, respectively. At Yale, Allen worked with future physicist Richard F. Casten.

Allen was a research associate in the Nuclear Physics Laboratory at the University of Washington prior to his selection as an astronaut. He was a staff physicist at the Nuclear Structure Laboratory at Yale University in 1965 and 1966, and during the period 1963 to 1967, was a guest researcher at Brookhaven National Laboratory.

== NASA experience ==
Allen was selected as a scientist-astronaut by NASA in August 1967 as a member of the second group of scientist-astronauts. He completed flight training at Vance Air Force Base, Oklahoma. He was mission scientist while a member of the astronaut support crew for Apollo 15 and was a staff consultant on science and technology to the President's Council on International Economic Policy.

From August 1975 to 1978, Allen was NASA Assistant Administrator for Legislative Affairs in Washington, D.C. Returning to the Johnson Space Center in 1978, as a senior scientist astronaut, Allen was assigned to the Operations Mission Development Group. He was a support crew member for the first orbital flight test of the Space Shuttle (Columbia) in April 1981 and was the CAPCOM during the reentry phase for this mission. In addition, in 1980 and 1981, he worked as the technical assistant to the director of flight operations.

== Space experience ==
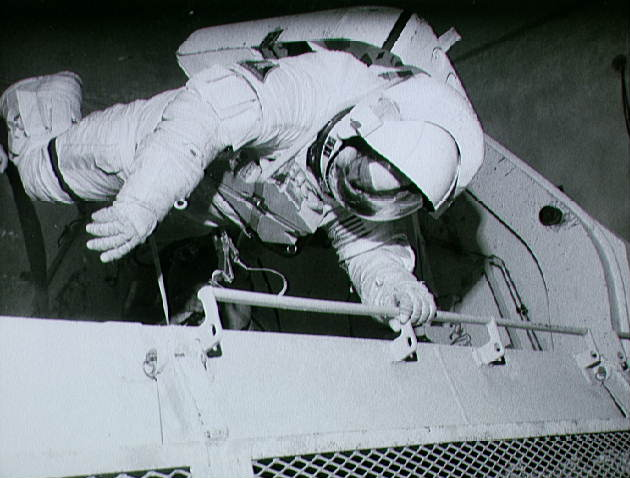
Allen training for planned STS-5 spacewalk

Allen was mission specialist on STS-5, the first fully operational flight of the Space Shuttle program, which launched from Kennedy Space Center, Florida, on November 11, 1982. He was accompanied by Vance D. Brand (spacecraft commander), Col. Robert F. Overmyer (pilot), and Dr. William B. Lenoir (mission specialist). STS-5, the first mission with four crewmembers, clearly demonstrated the Space Shuttle as fully operational by the successful first deployment of two commercial communications satellites from the Orbiter's payload bay. The mission marked the first use of the Payload Assist Module (PAM-D), and its new ejection system. Numerous flight tests were performed throughout the mission to document Shuttle performance during launch, boost, orbit, atmospheric entry and landing phases. STS-5 was the last flight to carry the Development Flight Instrumentation (DFI) package to support flight testing. A Getaway Special, three Student Involvement Projects, and medical experiments were included on the mission. A planned spacewalk by Allen and Lenoir, the first of the Space Shuttle program, was postponed by one day after Lenoir became ill, and then had to be canceled when the two spacesuits that were to be used developed problems. The STS-5 crew successfully concluded the 5-day orbital flight of Space Shuttle Columbia with the first entry and landing through a cloud deck to a hard-surface runway and demonstrated maximum braking. STS-5 completed 81 orbits of the Earth in 122 hours before landing on a concrete runway at Edwards Air Force Base, California, on November 16, 1982.

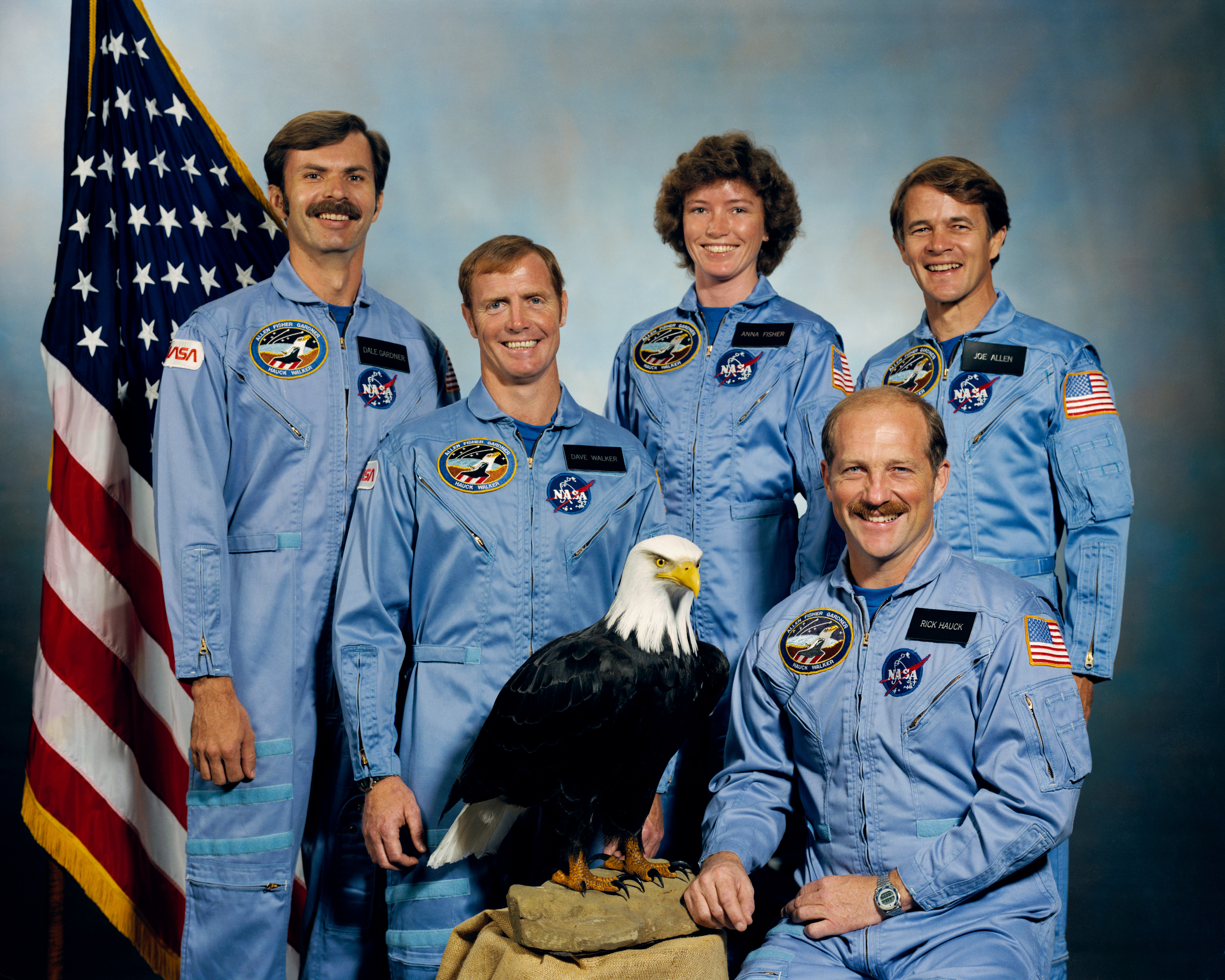
Allen (standing at right) with the crew of STS-51-A

Allen was a mission specialist on STS 51-A, which launched from Kennedy Space Center, Florida, on November 8, 1984. He was accompanied by Captain Frederick (Rick) Hauck (spacecraft commander), Captain David M. Walker (pilot), and fellow mission specialists, Dr. Anna Lee Fisher and Commander Dale Gardner. This was the second flight of the Orbiter Discovery. During the mission the crew deployed two satellites, Canada's Anik D-2 (Telesat H) and Hughes' LEASAT-1 (Syncom IV-1), and operated the 3M Company's Diffusive Mixing of Organic Solutions experiment. In the first space salvage attempt in history, Allen and Gardner performed spacewalks and successfully retrieved for return to Earth the Palapa B-2 and Westar VI communications satellites. STS 51-A completed 127 orbits of the Earth in 192 hours before landing at Kennedy Space Center, Florida, on November 16, 1984. With the completion of this flight Allen logged a total of 314 hours in space.

== Post-NASA experience ==
Allen was chief executive officer of Space Industries International, Washington, D.C., and later was chairman of Veridian, until he retired in 2004. General Dynamics announced its acquisition of Veridian on June 9, 2003.

In the 1998 HBO miniseries From the Earth to the Moon, Allen was played by Doug McKeon.

In the 1998 movie Armageddon, directed by Michael Bay, Allen was a NASA consultant and cameoed as "Kennedy Launch" during the launching of the X-71 shuttles. Allen was presented Sagamore of the Wabash, the top award from the state of Indiana, by U.S. Representative Jim Baird and State Representative Beau Baird.

== Personal life ==
Allen married Bonnie Jo Darling of Elkhart, Indiana in 1961. They have two children. Bonnie Darling died in early 2021.

== Works ==
- Entering Space: An Astronaut's Odyssey (1985) ISBN 0-941434-74-5

Allen was a contributor to the book NASA's Scientist-Astronauts by David Shayler and Colin Burgess.

== Organizations ==
Allen is a member of several organizations, including the American Physical Society, the American Astronautical Society, the American Institute of Aeronautics and Astronautics, the American Association for the Advancement of Science, Phi Beta Kappa, Beta Theta Pi, Sigma Xi, and Phi Eta Sigma.

== Special honors ==
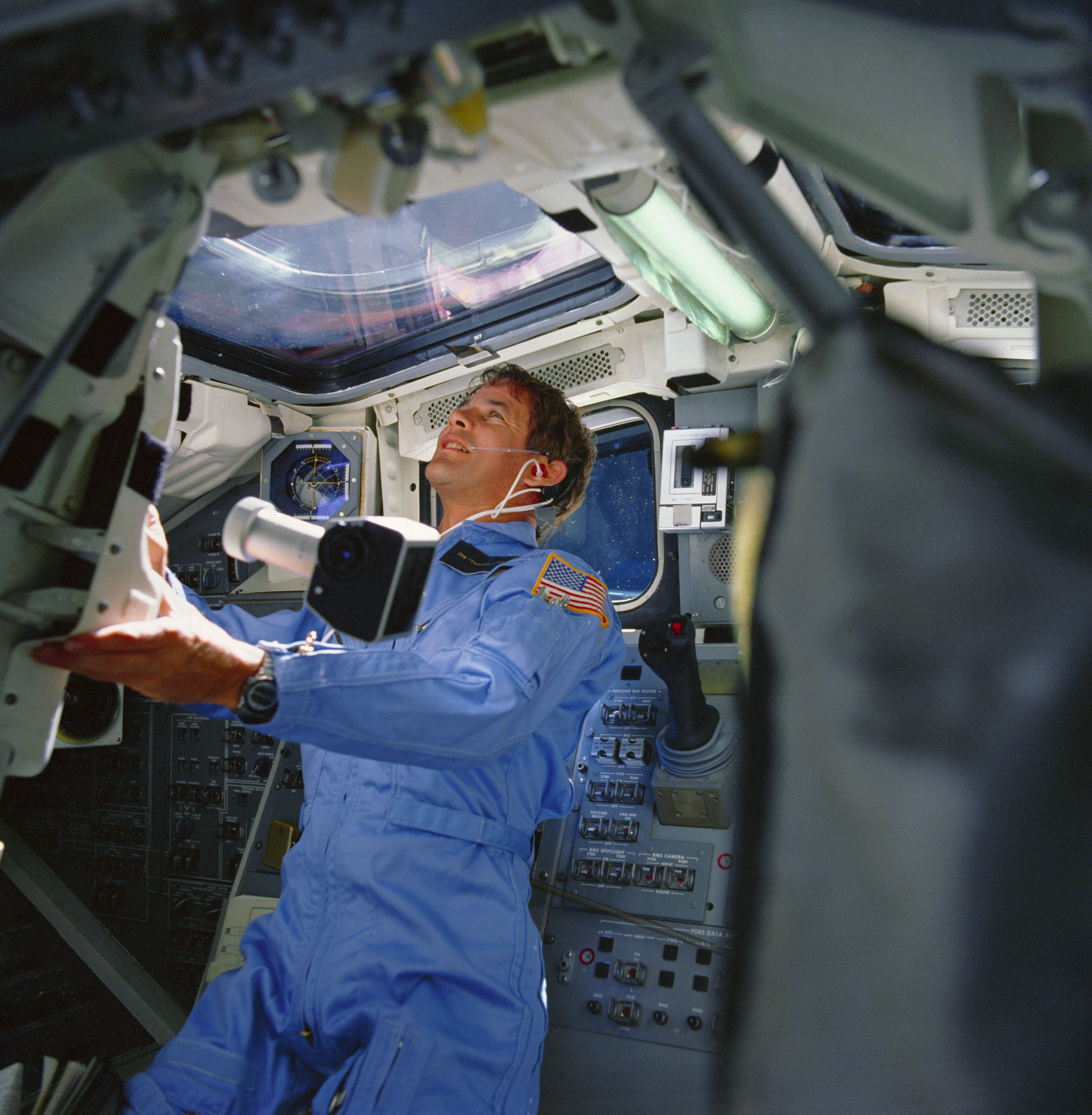
Allen performing Earth observation on STS-5 in 1982

- Fulbright Scholarship (1959–1960)
- Outstanding Flying Award, Class 69–06, Vance Air Force Base (1969)
- Two NASA Group Achievement Awards (1971 and 1974) in recognition of contributions to the Apollo 15 Lunar Traverse Planning Team and for subsequent work on the Outlook for Space Study Team
- Yale Science and Engineering Association Award for Advancement of Basic and Applied Science (1972)
- DePauw University Distinguished Alumnus Award (1972)
- NASA Exceptional Scientific Achievement Medal (1973)
- NASA Exceptional Service Medal (1978)
- NASA Superior Performance Award (1975 and 1981)
- Honorary Doctor of Science from DePauw University (1983)
- Komarov Diploma from the Fédération Aéronautique Internationale
- Indiana Aviation Hall of Fame, 2024 Joseph Allen
- Sagamore of the Wabash 2024 Back home again in Indiana, astronaut Joe Allen awarded Sagamore of Wabash

Allen was one of three shuttle astronaut inducted into the U.S. Astronaut Hall of Fame in 2005.

== Sources ==
- http://science.ksc.nasa.gov/persons/astronauts/a-to-d/AllenJP.txt {{Webarchive|url= 1989)
