= William B. Lenoir =

American astronaut (1939–2010)

William Lenoir
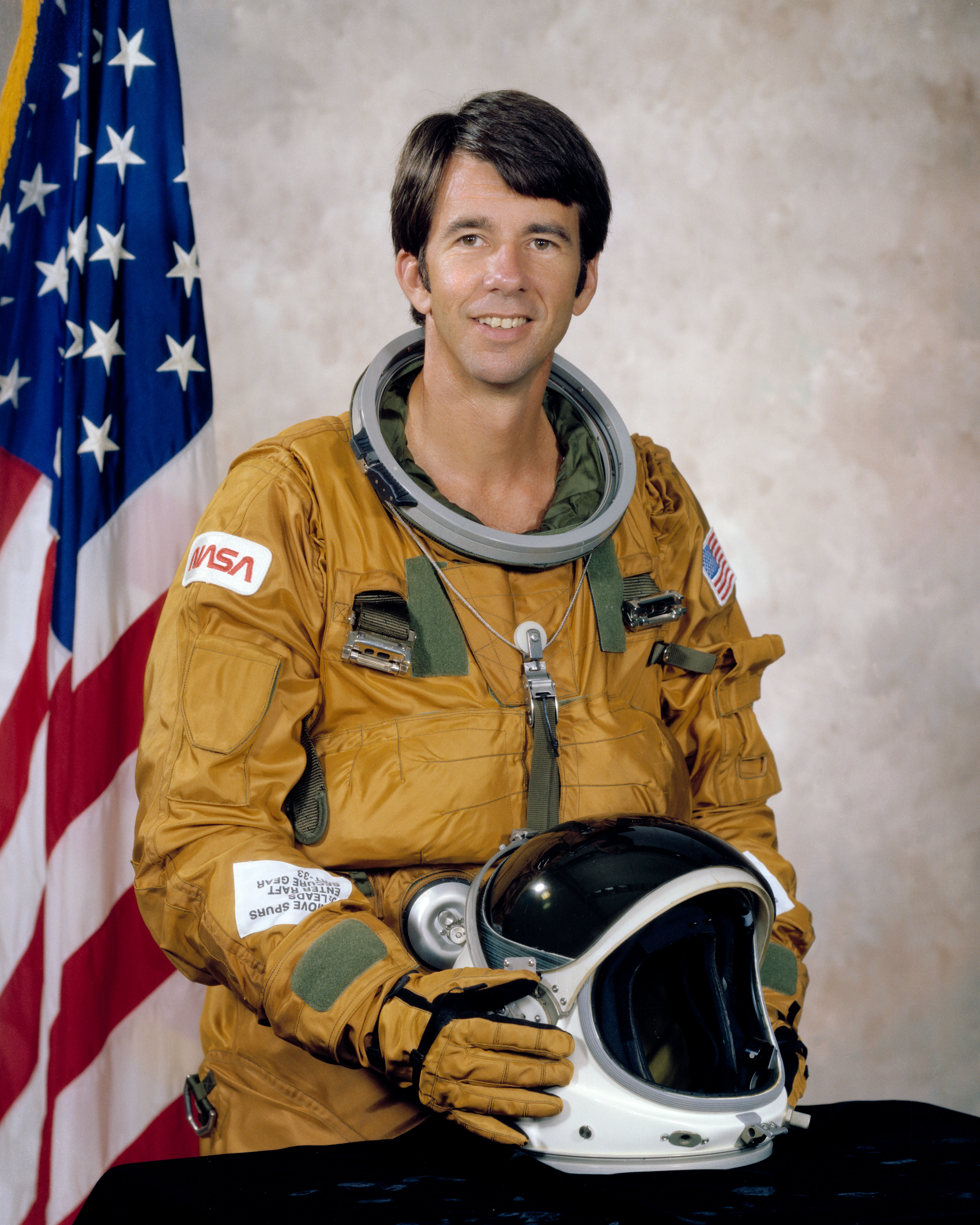
- Lenoir in 1979
- Born: William Benjamin Lenoir; March 14, 1939; Miami, Florida, U.S.
- Died: August 26, 2010 (aged 71); Sandoval County, New Mexico, U.S.
- Education: Massachusetts Institute of Technology (BS, MS, PhD)
- Space career

NASA astronaut
- Time in space: 5d 2h 14m
- Selection: NASA Group 6 (1967)
- Missions: STS-5
- Mission insignia: STS-5 Logo
- Retired: April 1992
- Scientific career
- Fields: Electrical engineering
- Thesis: Remote Sounding of the Upper Atmosphere by Microwave Measurements (1965)

William Benjamin Lenoir (March 14, 1939 – August 26, 2010) was an American electrical engineer and NASA astronaut.

== Early life and education ==
William Benjamin Lenoir was born on March 14, 1939, in Miami, Florida, as a son of Samuel Staples Lenoir (1910–1989) and Iona Catherine Lenoir (née Yann; 1915–1977). He attended Coral Gables Elementary School, Ponce de Leon Junior High School, and graduated from Coral Gables Senior High School in 1957. He graduated with a Bachelor of Science degree in electrical engineering from the Massachusetts Institute of Technology in 1961, where he was an active member of Sigma Alpha Epsilon (SAE). Lenoir continued at MIT, earning a Master of Science degree in 1962, and a Doctor of Philosophy degree in EECS in 1965. While working for his doctoral degree, Lenoir received an award for excelling at teaching undergraduate courses.

From 1964 to 1965, Lenoir was an instructor at MIT; and in 1965, he was named associate professor of electrical engineering. His work at MIT included teaching electromagnetic theory and systems theory, as well as performing research in remote sensing. He was an investigator in several satellite experiments and continued research in this area while fulfilling his astronaut assignments.

== NASA career ==
Lenoir was working on Apollo Applications experiments at MIT when he saw an advertisement in a science magazine recruiting NASA astronauts. He sent in an application and was selected as a scientist-astronaut by NASA in August 1967. He completed the initial academic training and a 53-week course in flight training at Laughlin Air Force Base, Texas. He received his wings with distinguished graduate honors in April 1969.

Lenoir was backup science pilot for Skylab 3 and Skylab 4, the second and third crewed missions in the Skylab program. During Skylab 4, he was co-leader of the visual observations project and coordinator between the flight crew and the principal investigators for the solar science experiments.

From September 1974 to July 1976, Lenoir spent approximately one-half of his time as leader of the NASA Satellite Power Team. This team was formed to investigate the potential of large-scale satellite power systems for terrestrial utility consumption and to make program recommendations to NASA Headquarters. Lenoir supported the Space Shuttle program in the areas of orbit operations, training, extravehicular activity, and payload deployment and retrieval.

Lenoir flew as a mission specialist on STS-5 (November 11–16, 1982), the first Space Shuttle flight to deploy commercial satellites, and logged over 122 hours in space. Following STS-5, Lenoir was responsible for the direction and management of mission development within the Astronaut Office.

Lenoir resigned from NASA in September 1984, to assume a position with the management and technology consulting firm of Booz Allen Hamilton in Arlington, Virginia. He returned to NASA in June 1989 as the Associate Administrator for Space Flight, responsible for the development, operating and implementation of the necessary policy for the Space Shuttle and all U.S. government civil launch activities.

Lenoir resigned from NASA again in April 1992, to become vice president of the Applied Systems Division at Booz Allen Hamilton in Bethesda, Maryland.

=== Spaceflight experience ===
STS-5 launched from Kennedy Space Center, Florida, on November 11, 1982. This was the first operational flight of the Space Shuttle Columbia and became known as the "We Deliver" mission. Two commercial communications satellites with Payload Assist Module upper stages (PAM-D) were successfully deployed from the Orbiter's cargo bay, a new first. This activity was shared with the world when the onboard television tape was played to the control center later that evening. In addition to collecting precise data to document the Shuttle's performance during launch, boost, orbit, atmospheric entry and landing phases, STS-5 carried a Getaway Special experiment, three Student Involvement Project experiments, and medical experiments. STS-5 was the last flight to carry the Development Flight Instrumentation (DFI) package to support flight testing.

Lenoir and Allen were to perform a spacewalk, the first of the Shuttle program, to test newly developed space suits. The space suits were developed as cheaper and less complicated alternatives to the Apollo versions. The test was delayed by one day due to Lenoir succumbing to motion sickness. Then an underperforming oxygen regulator in Lenoir's suit caused them to cancel the extravehicular activity (EVA) entirely. It was the first time in the history of the space program that an EVA had been cancelled due to space suit issues.

The STS-5 crew successfully concluded the 5-day orbital flight of Columbia with the first entry and landing through a cloud deck to a hard-surface runway, demonstrating maximum braking. STS-5 completed 81 orbits of the Earth before landing at Edwards Air Force Base, California, on November 16, 1982.

== Personal life ==
Lenoir was married twice. He had three children.

Lenoir logged over 3,000 hours of flying time in jet aircraft.

== Death ==
Lenoir died August 26, 2010, after suffering head injuries during a bicycle accident near his home in Sandoval County, New Mexico.

== Organizations ==
Lenoir was a senior member of the Institute of Electrical and Electronics Engineers, and a member of the American Institute of Aeronautics and Astronautics, Eta Kappa Nu and the Society of Sigma Xi.

== Honors and awards ==
Lenoir received a number of honors. He was a Sloan Scholar at the Massachusetts Institute of Technology, winner of the Carleton E. Tucker Award for Teaching Excellence at MIT, and recipient of the NASA Exceptional Service Medal (1974) and NASA Space Flight Medal (1982).

== See also ==
- List of spaceflight records
