= STS-5 =

1982 American crewed spaceflight to deploy communications satellites

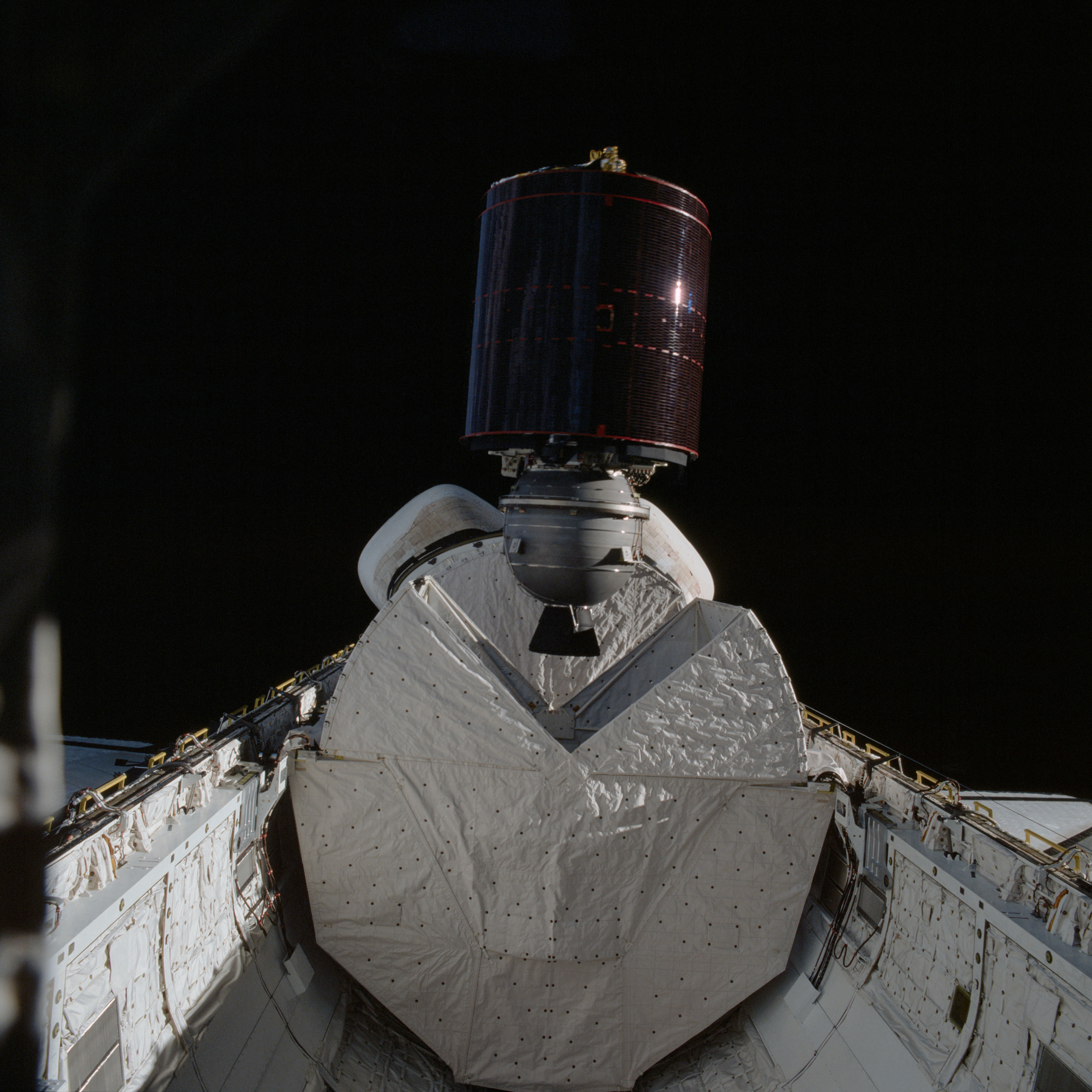
- The SBS-3 satellite with attached PAM-D motor is deployed from Columbia.
- Names: Space Transportation System-5
- Mission type: Communications satellites deployment
- Operator: NASA
- COSPAR ID: 1982-110A
- SATCAT no.: 13650
- Mission duration: 5 days, 2 hours, 14 minutes, 26 seconds
- Distance travelled: 3,397,082 km (2,110,849 mi)
- Orbits completed: 81

Spacecraft properties
- Spacecraft: Space Shuttle Columbia
- Launch mass: 112,088 kg (247,112 lb)
- Landing mass: 91,841 kg (202,475 lb)
- Payload mass: 14,551 kg (32,079 lb)

Crew
- Crew size: 4
- Members: Vance D. Brand; Robert F. Overmyer; William B. Lenoir; Joseph P. Allen

Start of mission
- Launch date: November 11, 1982, 11:19:00 UTC (7:19:00 am EST)
- Launch site: Kennedy, LC-39A
- Contractor: Rockwell International

End of mission
- Landing date: November 16, 1982, 14:33:26 UTC (6:33:26 am PST)
- Landing site: Edwards, Runway 22

Orbital parameters
- Reference system: Geocentric orbit
- Regime: Low Earth orbit
- Perigee altitude: 294 km (183 mi)
- Apogee altitude: 317 km (197 mi)
- Inclination: 28.50°
- Period: 90.50 minutes
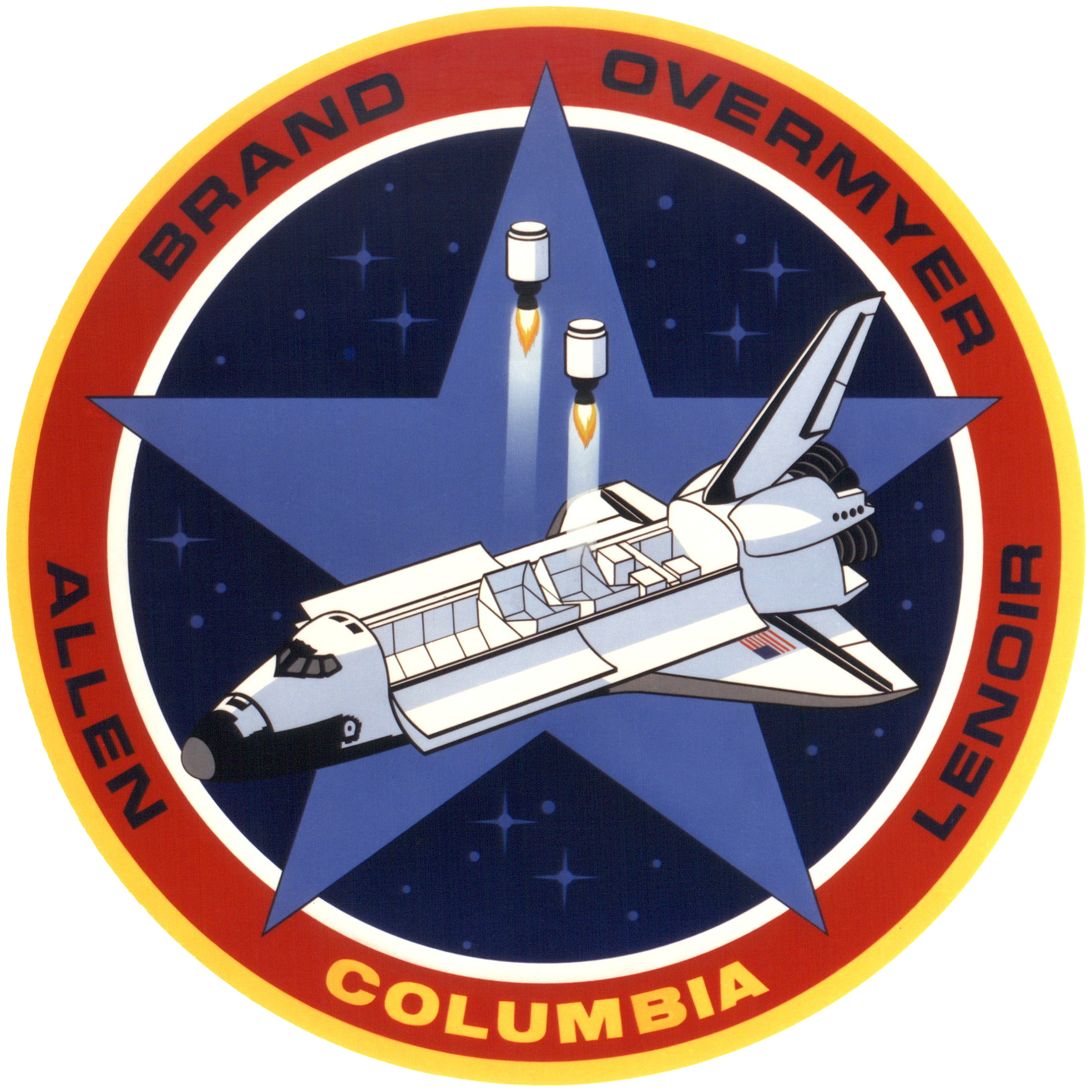
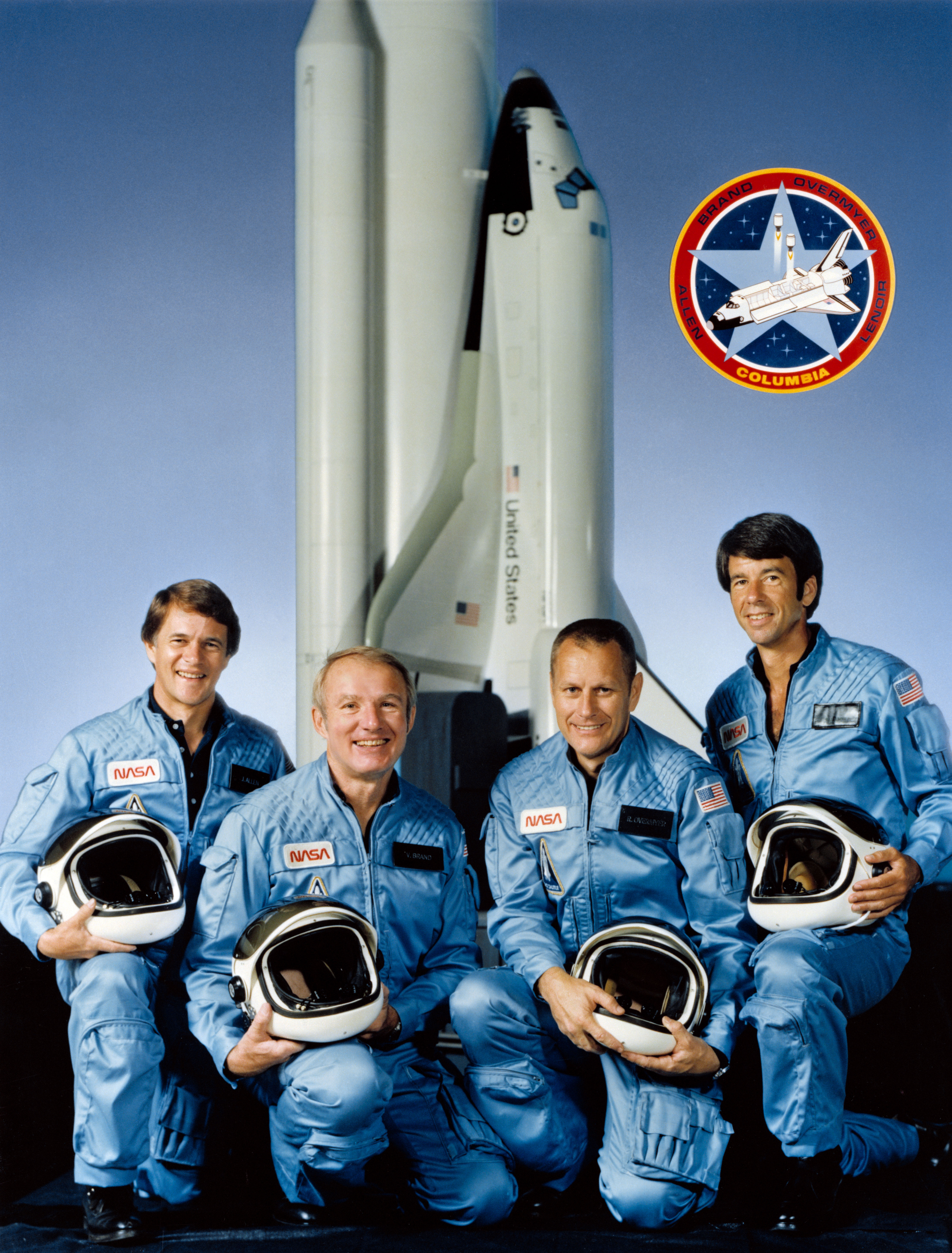
- STS-5 mission patch From left: Allen, Brand, Overmyer and Lenoir Space Shuttle program

STS-5 was the fifth NASA Space Shuttle mission and the fifth flight of the Space Shuttle Columbia. It launched on November 11, 1982, and landed five days later on November 16, 1982. STS-5 was the first Space Shuttle mission to deploy communications satellites into orbit, and the first officially "operational" Space Shuttle mission.

== Crew ==
Position	Astronaut
Commander	Vance D. Brand; Second spaceflight
Pilot	Robert F. Overmyer; First spaceflight
Mission Specialist 1	Joseph P. Allen; First spaceflight
Mission Specialist 2 Flight Engineer	William B. Lenoir; Only spaceflight

=== Support crew ===
- Roy D. Bridges Jr. (entry CAPCOM)
- Michael Coats
- Richard O. Covey
- Bryan D. O'Connor
- Jon McBride
- Robert L. Stewart (ascent CAPCOM)

=== Crew seat assignments ===
Seat	Launch	Landing	Seats 1–4 are on the flight deck. Seats 5–7 are on the mid-deck.
1	Brand		Seats 1–4 are on the flight deck. Seats 5–7 are on the mid-deck.
2	Overmyer		Seats 1–4 are on the flight deck. Seats 5–7 are on the mid-deck.
3	Unused		Seats 1–4 are on the flight deck. Seats 5–7 are on the mid-deck.
4	Lenoir	Allen	Seats 1–4 are on the flight deck. Seats 5–7 are on the mid-deck.
5	Allen	Lenoir	Seats 1–4 are on the flight deck. Seats 5–7 are on the mid-deck.
6	Unused		Seats 1–4 are on the flight deck. Seats 5–7 are on the mid-deck.
7	Unused		Seats 1–4 are on the flight deck. Seats 5–7 are on the mid-deck.

== Mission summary ==
Columbia launched on schedule from Kennedy Space Center (KSC) at 07:19:00 a.m. EST, on November 11, 1982. The shuttle carried a crew of four – the largest spacecraft crew up to that time – and the first two commercial communications satellites to be flown aboard a shuttle.

The commercial satellites were deployed successfully and subsequently propelled into their operational geosynchronous orbits by McDonnell Douglas PAM-D kick motors. The two satellites were SBS-3, owned by Satellite Business Systems, and Anik-C3, owned by Telesat Canada; both were Hughes-built HS-376-series satellites. In addition, STS-5 carried a West German-sponsored microgravity Getaway Special (GAS) experiment canister in the payload bay. The crew also conducted three student-designed experiments during the flight.

Lenoir and Allen were to perform a spacewalk, the first of the Space Shuttle program, to test newly developed space suits. The space suits were developed as cheaper and less complicated alternatives to the Apollo versions. The test was delayed by one day due to Lenoir succumbing to motion sickness. Then a poorly functioning oxygen regulator in Lenoir's suit and a broken recirculation fan in Allen's caused them to cancel the extravehicular activity (EVA) entirely. It was the first time in the history of the space program that an EVA had been cancelled due to space suit issues.

Columbia landed on Runway 22 at Edwards Air Force Base on November 16, 1982, at 06:33:26 a.m. PST, having traveled 3,397,082 km (2,110,849 mi) in 81 orbits during a mission that lasted 5 days, 2 hours, 14 minutes and 26 seconds. Columbia was returned to KSC on November 22, 1982. STS-5 was the first Space Shuttle flight in which the crew did not wear pressure suits for the launch, reentry, and landing portions of the flight, similar to the Soviet Voskhod and Soyuz missions prior to the ill-fated Soyuz 11 mission in 1971.

== Operational status ==
The Space Shuttle was formally declared "operational" after STS-4. However, the Columbia Accident Investigation Board (CAIB), in its report on the loss with all crew aboard of Columbia during STS-107 in 2003, asserted that the orbiter should never have been considered operational and that, while not intrinsically unsafe, it was in fact an experimental vehicle. The CAIB's rationale was that civilian and military aircraft that are considered operational must have been tested and proven over thousands of safe flights in their final operational configurations, whereas the shuttle had conducted under 200 flights, with continuous modification. NASA operated the Space Shuttle as an experimental vehicle for the remainder of the program.

== Mission insignia ==
The five points of the blue star of the mission patch indicate the flight's numerical designation in the Space Transportation System's mission sequence.

== Wake-up calls ==
NASA began a tradition of playing music to astronauts during the Project Gemini, and first used music to wake up a flight crew during Apollo 15. Each track is specially chosen, often by the astronauts' families, and usually has a special meaning to an individual member of the crew, or is applicable to their daily activities.

Flight Day	Song	Artist/Composer
Day 2	"76 Trombones"	The Music Man
Day 3	"Cotton Eyed Joe"	
Day 4	"Marine Hymn"	United States Marine Band
Day 5	"The Stroll"	The Diamonds/Clyde Otis
Day 6	"Take Me Home, Country Roads"	John Denver

== Gallery ==
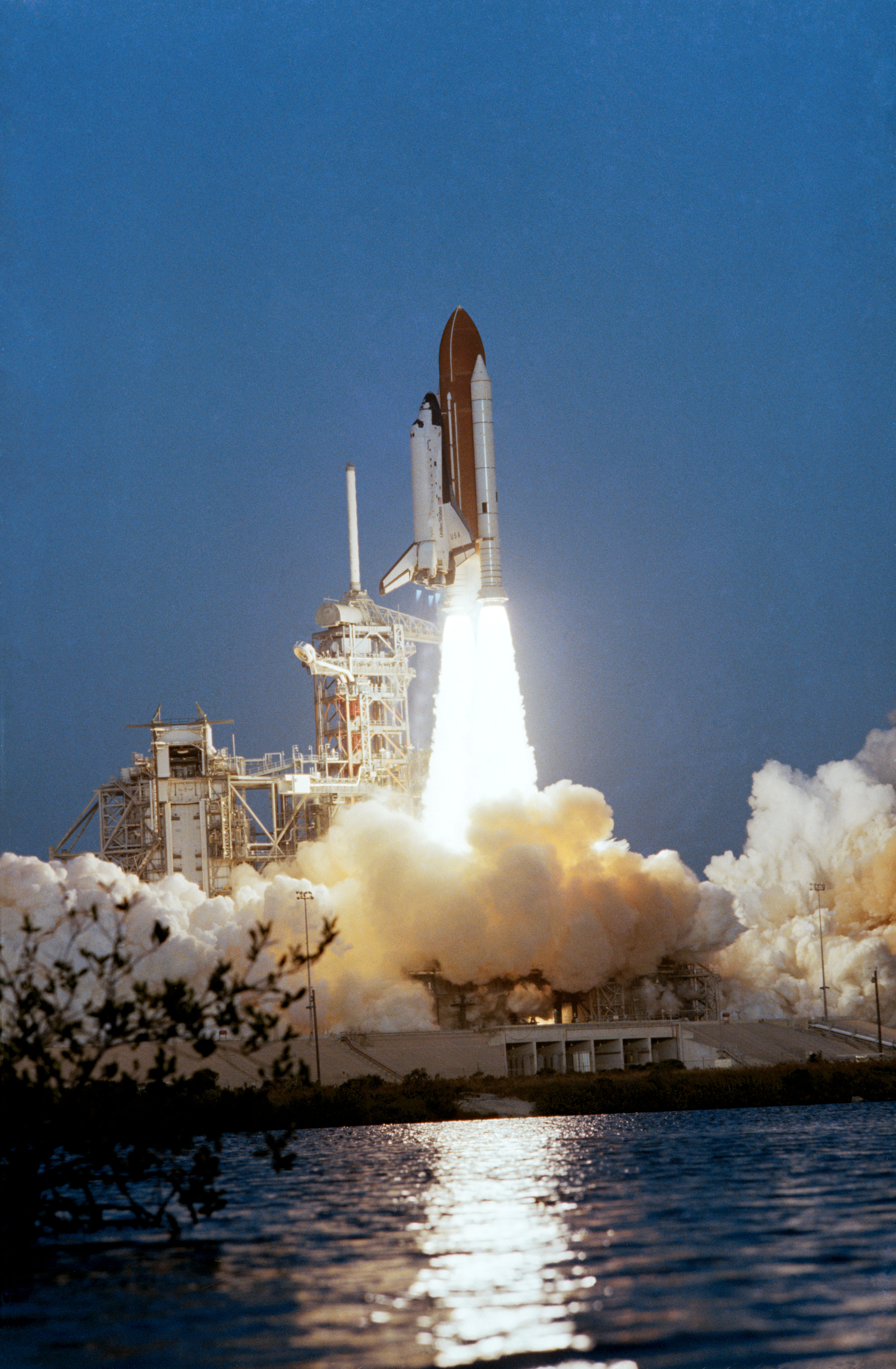
Columbia is launched from Launch Pad 39A on its fifth flight and first operational mission.

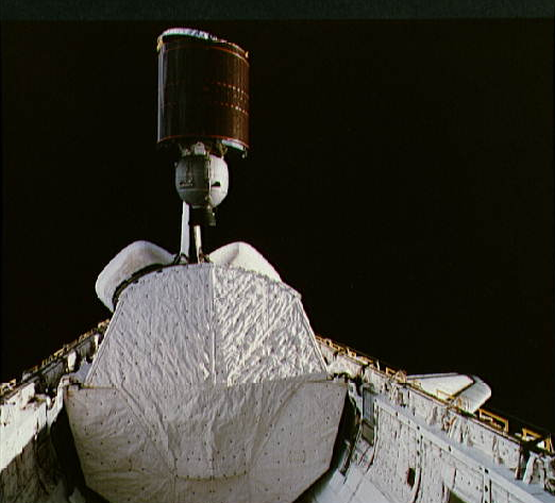
Anik-C3 being deployed.

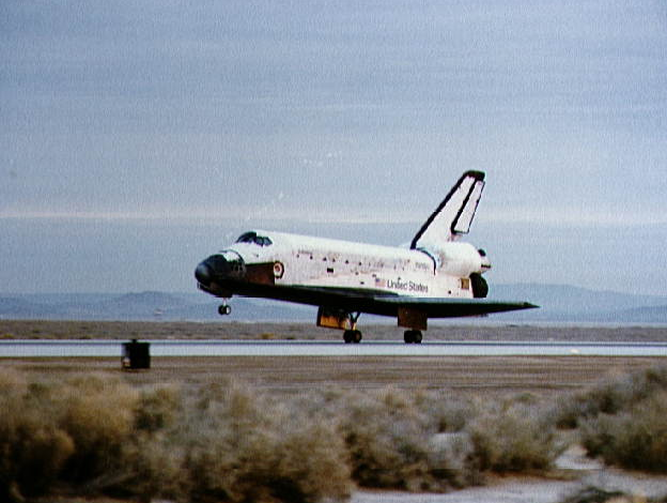
Columbia concluding its mission with an early morning landing at Runway 22 of Edwards Air Force Base.

== See also ==
- List of human spaceflights
- List of Space Shuttle missions
- Space Shuttle Columbia disaster
