= Space Industries Incorporated =

Space Industries Incorporated was a company formed in the 1980s for the purpose of building a privately owned space station, which was to be called the Industrial Space Facility (ISF). At the time, the idea of private development in space was a pioneering one.

== History ==
Space Industries was founded in Houston, Texas by Maxime Faget, who had recently retired as chief of engineering and operations at NASA, as well as entrepreneurs James Calaway, Guillermo Trotti, and Larry Bell. Their plan was to build a space station that would feed off the life support system of the Space Shuttle when it visited, but would not maintain continuous life support between shuttle visits. Faget proposed this plan because maintaining continuous life support would be cost prohibitive.

Joe Allen, a physicist and astronaut, was a partner, as was Westinghouse Electric Corporation. Investors included Roy M. Huffington, an oilman and later United States ambassador to Austria; James Elkins, not to be confused with James A. Elkins who was the co-founder of the Vinson & Elkins law firm; and Walter Mischer, a developer.

Calaway lobbied the United States government to be an anchor tenant in the proposed space station. In 1988, the Reagan Administration requested $700 million from the annual budget in order to participate in the project, but the request was not approved by Congress, and the space station was never built.

The company eventually merged with Calspan Corporation, which in turn merged with General Dynamics Corporation.

== Industrial Space Facility ==
The ISF was scheduled for launch in the early 1990s. It was to have 31 payload racks housing up to 11,000 kg (11 tons) of commercial industrial and microgravity manufacturing experiments. It was to have a pair of 140 m^{2} (1500 sq. ft.) solar panels each producing 20 kW of power. Software was developed that used a learning heuristic algorithm in order to most efficiently use the ISF's resources.
