= Bob Stewart =

Bob Stewart may refer to:

== Sports ==
- Bob Stewart (footballer, born 1894) (1894-1969), Scottish footballer, see List of Oldham Athletic A.F.C. players (25–99 appearances)
- Bob Stewart (footballer, born 1903) (1903–1965), Australian rules footballer for Richmond
- Bob Stewart (footballer, born 1939) (1939–2015), Australian rules footballer for North Melbourne
- Bob Stewart (footballer, born 1946), Australian rules footballer for Melbourne
- Bob Stewart (ice hockey) (1950–2017), ice hockey player
- Bob Stewart (umpire) (1915–1981), baseball umpire

== Other ==
- Bob Stewart (television producer) (1920–2012), television producer
- Bob Stewart (musician) (born 1945), tuba player
- Bob Stewart (politician) (born 1949), Conservative MP for Beckenham, former British Army Colonel and United Nations commander in Bosnia
- Bob Stewart (communist) (1877–1971), British spy and member of the Communist Party
- Bob Stewart (radio presenter) (1939–2019), British radio DJ and presenter
- Robertson Stewart (1913–2007), New Zealand industrialist and exporter also known as Bob Stewart

== See also ==
- Bobby Stewart, American boxer
- Bob Stuart (1920–2005), rugby union player
- Bob Stuart (rugby) (1887–1959), dual-code rugby player
- Robert Stuart (disambiguation)
- Robert Stewart (disambiguation)
