= Robert L. Gibson =

American astronaut (born 1946)

Robert Gibson
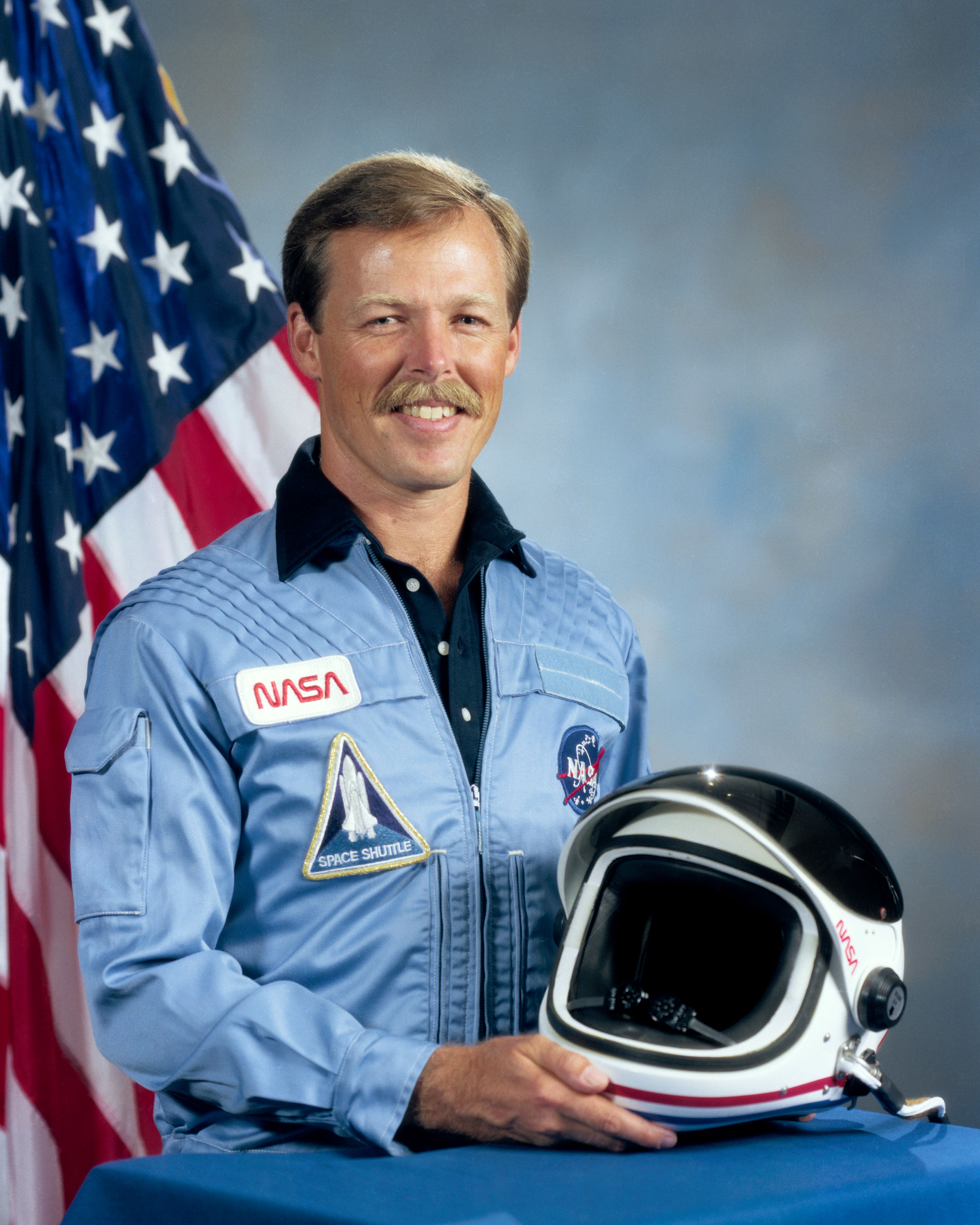
- Born: Robert Lee Gibson; October 30, 1946 (age 79); Cooperstown, New York, U.S.
- Other name: Hoot
- Education: Suffolk County Community College (AS); California Polytechnic State University, San Luis Obispo (BS)
- Awards: Defense Superior Service Medal; Distinguished Flying Cross; Air Medal
- Space career

NASA astronaut
- Rank: Captain, USN
- Time in space: 36d 4h 15m
- Selection: NASA Group 8 (1978)
- Missions: STS-41-B; STS-61-C; STS-27; STS-47; STS-71
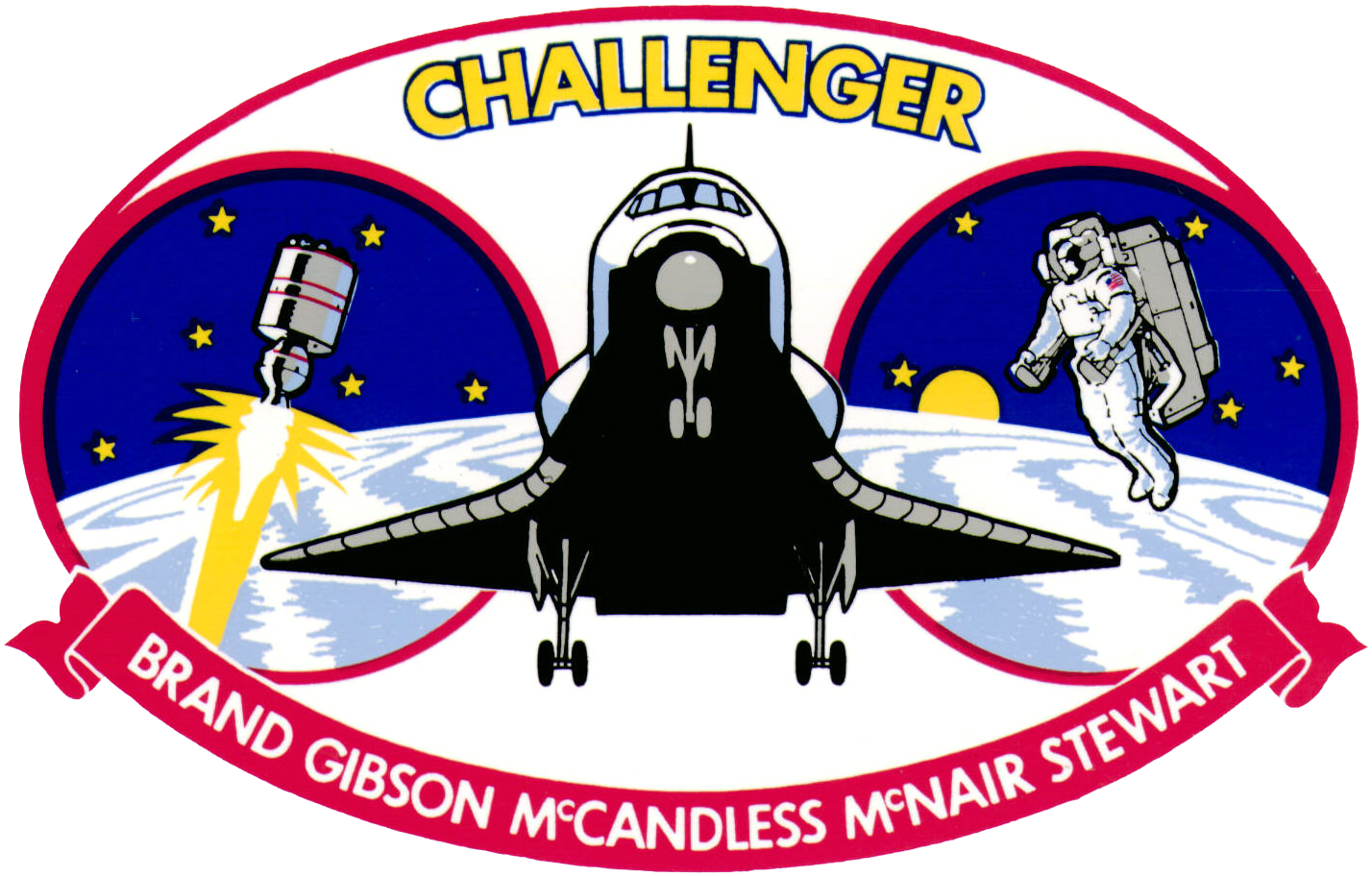
- Mission insignia
- Retired: November 15, 1996

Signature
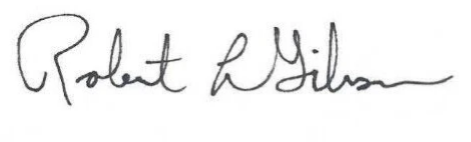

Robert Lee "Hoot" Gibson (born October 30, 1946) is a former American naval officer and aviator, test pilot, and aeronautical engineer. A retired NASA astronaut, he also served as Chief of the Astronaut Office from 1992 to 1997. Today Gibson is active as a professional pilot, racing regularly at the annual Reno Air Races. He was inducted into the U.S. Astronaut Hall of Fame in 2003 and the National Aviation Hall of Fame in 2013, and has received several military decorations throughout his career.

== Early life and education ==
Gibson was born October 30, 1946, in Cooperstown, New York. He graduated from Huntington High School, Huntington, New York as a part of the Class of 1964, and went on to earn an Associate degree in engineering science from Suffolk County Community College in 1966. He received a Bachelor of Science degree in aeronautical engineering from California Polytechnic State University in 1969.

== Military career ==
Gibson entered active duty with the U.S. Navy in 1969. He was commissioned through the Aviation Officer Candidate School (AOCS), and proceed to flight training. He received basic and primary flight training at Naval Air Station Pensacola and Naval Air Station Saufley Field, Florida, and Naval Air Station Meridian, Mississippi. He completed advanced flight training at Naval Air Station Kingsville, Texas and was assigned to Fighter Squadron 121 (VF-121) at Naval Air Station Miramar, California for replacement training in the F-4 Phantom II.

While assigned to Fighter Squadron 111 (VF-111) and Fighter Squadron 1 (VF-1) from April 1972 to September 1975, he saw duty aboard aircraft carriers USS Coral Sea and USS Enterprise, flying combat missions in Southeast Asia in the F-4 with VF-111 and making the initial operational carrier deployment of the F-14 Tomcat with VF-1. He is a graduate of the Navy Fighter Weapons School, also known as "TOPGUN."

Gibson returned to the United States and an assignment as an F-14A instructor pilot with Fighter Squadron 124 (VF-124) at Naval Air Station Miramar. He graduated from the U.S. Naval Test Pilot School at Naval Air Station Patuxent River, Maryland in June 1977 and later became involved in the test and evaluation of improvements to the F-14A aircraft while assigned to the Naval Air Test Center's Strike Aircraft Test Directorate.

Selected as a NASA astronaut, he continued to be promoted, eventually achieving the rank of captain in the U.S. Navy and the rank at which he retired from active naval service.

Charles F. Bolden, his copilot on STS-61-C, described Gibson and John Young as the two best pilots he had met "in my life in aviation, over thirty-five years; never met two people like them. Everyone else gets into an airplane; John and Hoot wear their airplane. They're just awesome".

Gibson's flight experience included over 6,000 flying hours (14,000 hours in total) in over 140 types of civil and military aircraft. He holds an airline transport pilot license. In 2006 he was required to stop flying for the airlines because he reached his 60th birthday. He still holds a multi-engine and instrument rating. He has held a private pilot rating since age 17. Gibson has also completed over 300 carrier landings.

== NASA career ==
Selected by NASA in January 1978, Gibson became an astronaut in August 1979. Gibson flew five missions: STS-41-B in 1984, STS-61-C in 1986, STS-27 in 1988, STS-47 in 1992, and STS-71 in 1995. Gibson served as Chief of the Astronaut Office (December 1992 to September 1994) and as Deputy Director, Flight Crew Operations (March–November 1996).

On his first space flight, Gibson was the pilot on STS 41-B, which launched from Kennedy Space Center on February 3, 1984. The flight deployed two Hughes 376 communications satellites which later failed to reach geosynchronous orbits due to upper-stage rocket failures. The STS 41-B mission marked the first checkout of the Manned Maneuvering Unit (MMU) and Manipulator Foot Restraint (MFR), with Bruce McCandless II and Bob Stewart performing two EVAs (spacewalks). The German Shuttle Pallet Satellite (SPAS), Remote Manipulator System (RMS), six "Getaway Specials", and materials processing experiments were included on the mission. The eight-day orbital flight of Challenger culminated in the first-ever landing at the Kennedy Space Center on February 11, 1984.

Gibson was the commander of the STS-61-C mission, and the first of only four people under the age of 40 to command an STS mission. The seven-man crew on board the Orbiter Columbia launched from the Kennedy Space Center on January 12, 1986. During the six-day flight, the crew deployed the SATCOM Ku-band satellite and conducted experiments in astrophysics and materials processing. The mission concluded with a successful night landing at Edwards Air Force Base, California, on January 18, 1986.

Gibson subsequently participated in the investigation of the Space Shuttle Challenger accident, and also participated in the redesign and recertification of the solid rocket boosters.

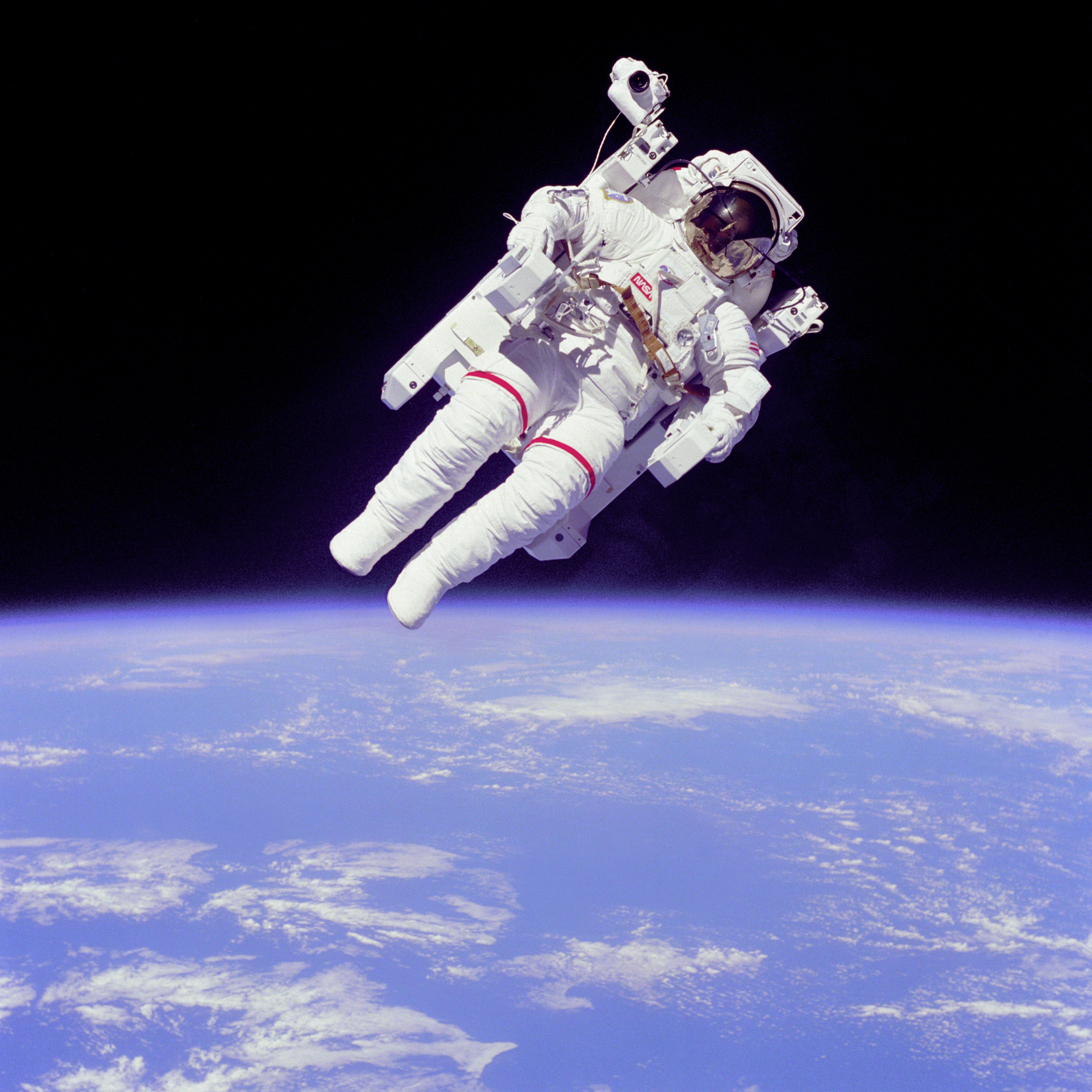
The famous photo showing McCandless using the MMU. It was Gibson who took the photo and later remarked imagining about the caption being "NASA Photo by Hooter" STS-41-B in 1984

As the commander of STS-27, Gibson and his five-man crew launched from the Kennedy Space Center on December 2, 1988, aboard the Orbiter Atlantis. The mission carried a Department of Defense payload, and a number of secondary payloads. After 68 orbits of the Earth the mission concluded with a dry lakebed landing on Runway 17 at Edwards Air Force Base on December 6, 1988. The mission is noteworthy due to the severe damage Atlantis sustained to its critical heat-resistant tiles during ascent.

When in training for the 1991 STS-46 mission, Gibson was involved in a collision during a weekend air race in Texas that left a second pilot dead and raised questions about the enforcement of rules banning such high-risk activity by expensively trained astronauts. He lost his flight status on NASA's T-38 training aircraft for one year, thus being unable to participate in the training for the mission.

On Gibson's fourth space flight, the fiftieth Space Shuttle mission, he served as commander of STS-47, Spacelab-J, which launched on September 12, 1992, aboard the Orbiter Endeavour. The mission was a cooperative venture between the United States and Japan, and included the first Japanese astronaut, Mamoru Mohri, and the first African-American woman, Mae Jemison, in the crew. During the eight-day flight, the crew focused on life science and materials processing experiments in over forty investigations in the Spacelab laboratory, as well as scientific and engineering tests performed aboard the Orbiter Endeavour. The mission ended with a successful landing at the Kennedy Space Center on September 20, 1992.

On his last flight, (June 27 to July 7, 1995), Gibson commanded a crew of seven-members (up) and eight-members (down) on Space Shuttle mission STS-71. This was the first Space Shuttle mission to dock with the Russian Space Station Mir, and involved an exchange of crews. The Atlantis Space Shuttle was modified to carry a docking system compatible with the Russian Mir Space Station. It also carried a Spacelab module in the payload bay in which the crew performed various life sciences experiments and data collections. When the hatch separating the two modules was opened, Gibson and Vladimir Dezhurov shook hands. Later that day, President Bill Clinton in a statement mentioned that this handshake was a major breakthrough towards the ending of the Cold War.

When giving public speeches, Gibson often jokes that he ended the Cold War.

In five space flights, Gibson completed a total of 36.5 days in space.

== Post-NASA career ==
Gibson left NASA in November 1996 and became a pilot for Southwest Airlines. In 2006, as reported by NASA Watch, Gibson was forced to retire as mandated by the Federal Aviation Administration for commercial airline pilots. Gibson has publicly spoken out against federal regulations which require airline pilots to retire at age 60. In December 2006, he joined the Benson Space Company as chief operating officer and chief test pilot. Gibson has flown 111 different aircraft types, and has become a regular competitor at the annual Reno Air Races. In 1998, Gibson flying the Hawker Sea Fury "Riff-Raff" won the Unlimited Class in the Inaugural Running of the EAA AirVenture Cup Race.

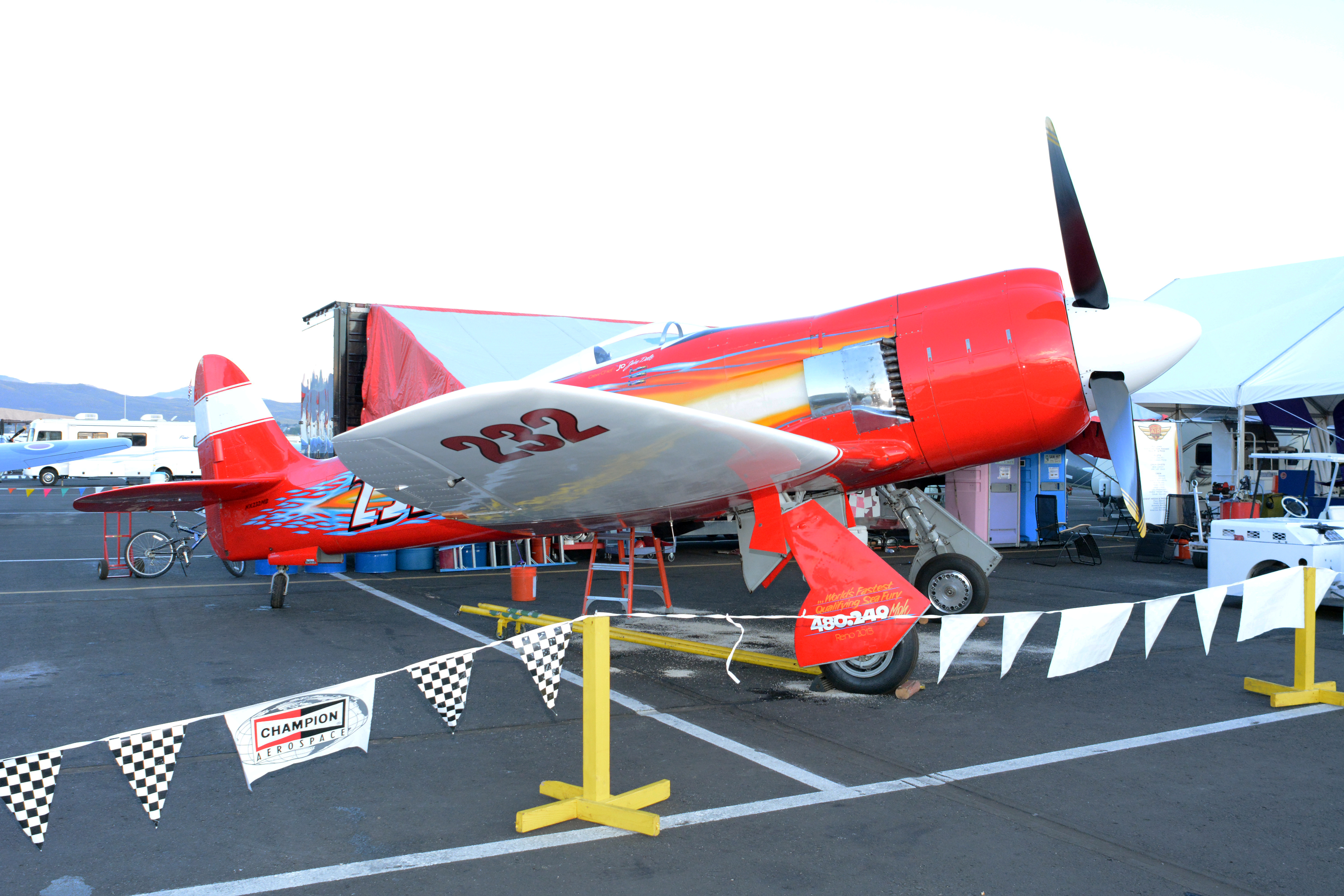
Hawker Sea Fury aka September Fury race 232

Beginning in 2009, Gibson flew as a demonstration pilot for Hawker Beechcraft Corporation to showcase the Premier 1A light business jet across the United States and overseas.

In 2010, The Academy of Model Aeronautics, the United States' national aeromodeling organization, named Gibson a spokesperson and Ambassador to promote the hobby of radio controlled model flight and to encourage an interest in aviation amongst young people. Gibson has stated that his interest in manned flight and his career as a test pilot and astronaut has its origin in his building of model aircraft as a youth. Gibson remains an avid radio controlled model hobbyist and is reportedly constructing a flyable version of the experimental vertical take off and landing Convair XFY-1 Pogo of the 1950s.

Gibson worked with the National Transportation Safety Board following the 2011 Reno Air Races crash. This was documented in an Air Disasters episode several years later.

In September 2013, Gibson qualified the Hawker Sea Fury known as "September Fury" in race #232 at the 50th National Championship Air Races at a speed of 479.164 mph. This is the fastest Sea Fury qualifying time.

In September 2015, Gibson qualified the P-51D, known as "Strega" at the 52nd National Championship Air Races at a speed of 475.043, and won the Gold Unlimited Race finishing at 488.983 mph average speed. He was crowned the Unlimited Gold Champion for 2015.

== Personal life ==
On May 30, 1981, he married fellow astronaut, Rhea Seddon of Murfreesboro, Tennessee. Their first child was born in July 1982. Gibson already had one child, a daughter, from his first marriage. Gibson and Seddon had two further children.

Gibson enjoys home-built aircraft, Formula One Air Racing, Unlimited Class Air Racing, running and surfing during his free time.

In October 2008, Gibson was a contestant on Are You Smarter Than a 5th Grader?. During his appearance, he became the first contestant to make it to the million-dollar question without using any of his cheats. He incorrectly answered the $1,000,000 question ("How many factors do 32 and 28 share?"). The correct answer is three; 1, 2, and 4. He answered with two (2 and 4). All of his prize money ($25,000) went to the Astronaut Scholarship Foundation.

== Awards and honors ==
- Awarded the Fédération Aéronautique Internationale (FAI) "Louis Blériot Medal" (1991 and 2004)
- Awarded the "Yuri A. Gagarin Gold Medal" by the FAI
- Awarded the Experimental Aircraft Association (EAA) "Freedom of Flight" Award (1989)
- U.S. Astronaut Hall of Fame (2003)
- National Aviation Hall of Fame (2012)
- Established FAI world records for "Altitude in Horizontal Flight," Airplane Class C1A in 1991, "Time to Climb to 9000 Meters" in 1994 and "Speed over a closed course" in 2004.
- Awarded the William F. Shea award for contribution to aviation from the University of Nebraska-Omaha Aviation Institute (2012)
- U.S. Space Camp Hall of Fame (2012)

Military awards include the:

- Defense Superior Service Medal
- Distinguished Flying Cross
- Air Medal (3)
- Navy Commendation Medal with Combat "V"
- Navy Unit Commendation
- Meritorious Unit Commendation
- National Defense Service Medal (2)
- Armed Forces Expeditionary Medal
- Humanitarian Service Medal
- Vietnam Service Medal
- Vietnam Campaign Medal

Preceded by Daniel C. Brandenstein	Chief of the Astronaut Office; 1992–1994	Succeeded by Robert D. Cabana
