= Robert Stewart =

Robert Stewart may refer to:

== Nobility and politics ==
- Robert II of Scotland (1316–1390), King of Scots
- Robert III of Scotland (c. 1340–1406), King of Scots, son of the above
- Robert Stewart, 5th Lord of Aubigny (c. 1470–1544), French soldier
- Robert Stewart, Earl of March (c. 1522–1586), 1st Earl of March, Scottish nobleman
- Robert Stewart, 1st Earl of Orkney (1533–1593), illegitimate son of James V, King of Scotland
- Sir Robert Stewart (soldier) (died c. 1670), Scottish soldier, governor of Londonderry
- Robert Stewart, 1st Marquess of Londonderry (1739–1821), Irish politician and landowner
- Robert Stewart, Duke of Albany (c. 1340–1420), Scottish royal, regent to three Scottish monarchs
- Robert Stewart, Master of Atholl (died 1437), Scottish nobleman of royal descent, great-grandson of Robert II
- Robert Stewart, Viscount Castlereagh (1769–1822), Irish politician
- Robert Stewart (Australian politician) (1831–1908), member of the Queensland Legislative Assembly
- Robert Stewart (Canadian politician) (1850–1925)
- Robert Stewart (New South Wales politician) (1816–1875), New South Wales colonial politician
- Robert Stewart (Prince Edward Island politician) (1731–1787), first speaker of the Legislative Assembly of Prince Edward Island
- Robert Desmond Stewart (born 1949), Northern Irish politician
- Robert Marcellus Stewart (1815–1871), governor of Missouri
- Robert Strother Stewart (1878–1954), English lawyer, colonial judge and Liberal Party politician
- Robert Stewart (Alabama politician) (born 1990), American Democratic politician serving in the Alabama Senate

== Sports ==
- Robert Stewart (lineman) (1967–2022), arena football player
- Robert Stewart (American football coach), American football coach for Washburn University
- Robert Stewart (cricketer) (1856–1913), South African batsman
- Robert Stewart (draughts player) (1873–1941), British champion of English draughts from Scotland
- Robert Stewart (footballer, born 1894), Scottish footballer with Motherwell and Ayr United
- Robert Stewart (Morton footballer) (fl. 1900s), Scottish footballer with Morton
- Robert Stewart (sailor) (1906–1988), New Zealand yachtsman

== Business ==
- Robert Stewart (designer) (1924–1995), Scottish designer
- Robert Stewart (entrepreneur) (1918–2006), American entrepreneur and founder of GMA Network
- Sir Robert Stewart (industrialist) (born 1940), New Zealand industrialist

== Other ==
- Robert Banks Stewart (1931–2016), Scottish-born television writer, sometimes credited as Robert Stewart
- Sir Robert Christie Stewart (1926–2019), Scottish army officer, landowner, and lord lieutenant
- Robert John Stewart (born 1949), author and occultist
- Robert L. Stewart (born 1942), astronaut
- Robert Leslie Stewart (1918–1988), executioner
- Robert Prescott Stewart (1825–1894), Irish composer, organist and conductor
- Robert Stewart (priest) (1850–1895), Anglican Church missionary to China
- Robert Stewart (born 1963), perpetrator of the Carthage nursing home shooting
- Robert Stewart (born 1980), perpetrator of the murder of Zahid Mubarek
- Robert Stewart (saxophonist) (born 1969), American musician
- Robert Stewart, of Irry (1598–1662), Irish rebel
- Robert Walter Stewart (1812–1887), Scottish minister of the Free Church of Scotland
- Robert William Stewart (1850–1931), American police officer

== See also ==
- Rab Stewart (1932–1992), Scottish footballer from the 1950s and 1960s
- Rab Stewart (footballer, born 1962) (1962–2016), Scottish footballer from the 1980s
- Bob Stewart (disambiguation)
- Robert Stuart (disambiguation)
- Robert Steward (disambiguation)
- Rob Stewart (disambiguation)
