= STS-41-B =

1984 American crewed spaceflight

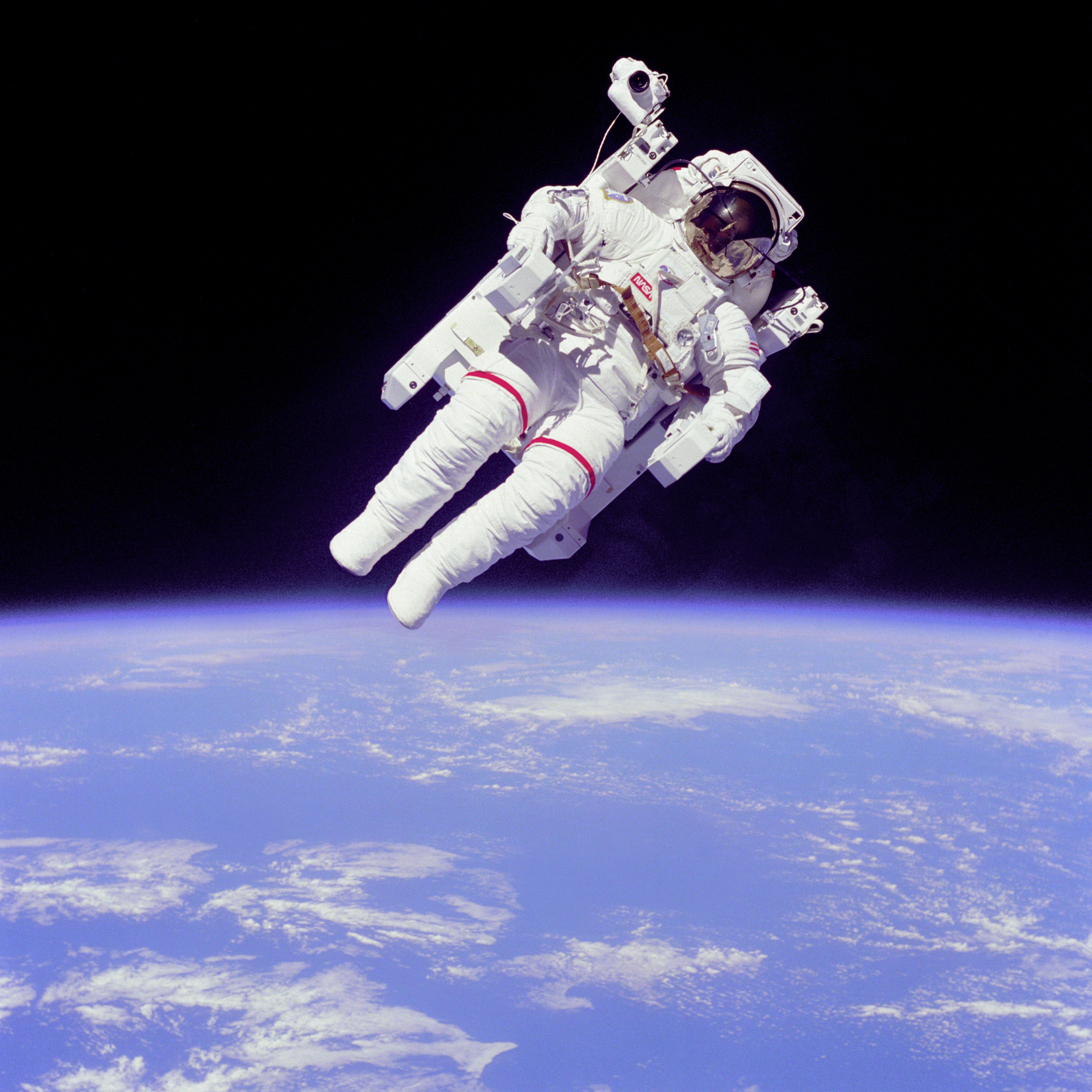
- Bruce McCandless II demonstrates the Manned Maneuvering Unit (MMU), floating in space above a clouded Earth.
- Names: Space Transportation System-41B; STS-11
- Mission type: Communications satellites deployment Equipment testing
- Operator: NASA
- COSPAR ID: 1984-011A
- SATCAT no.: 14681
- Mission duration: 7 days, 23 hours, 15 minutes, 55 seconds
- Distance travelled: 5,329,150 km (3,311,380 mi)
- Orbits completed: 128

Spacecraft properties
- Spacecraft: Space Shuttle Challenger
- Launch mass: 113,603 kg (250,452 lb)
- Landing mass: 91,280 kg (201,240 lb)
- Payload mass: 12,815 kg (28,252 lb)

Crew
- Crew size: 5
- Members: Vance D. Brand; Robert L. Gibson; Ronald E. McNair; Robert L. Stewart; Bruce McCandless II
- EVAs: 2
- EVA duration: 12 hours, 12 minutes; 1st EVA: 5 hours, 55 minutes; 2nd EVA: 6 hours, 17 minutes

Start of mission
- Launch date: February 3, 1984, 13:00:00 UTC (8:00 am EST)
- Launch site: Kennedy, LC-39A
- Contractor: Rockwell International

End of mission
- Landing date: February 11, 1984, 12:15:55 UTC (7:15:55 am EST)
- Landing site: Kennedy, SLF Runway 15

Orbital parameters
- Reference system: Geocentric orbit
- Regime: Low Earth orbit
- Perigee altitude: 307 km (191 mi)
- Apogee altitude: 317 km (197 mi)
- Inclination: 28.50°
- Period: 90.80 minutes
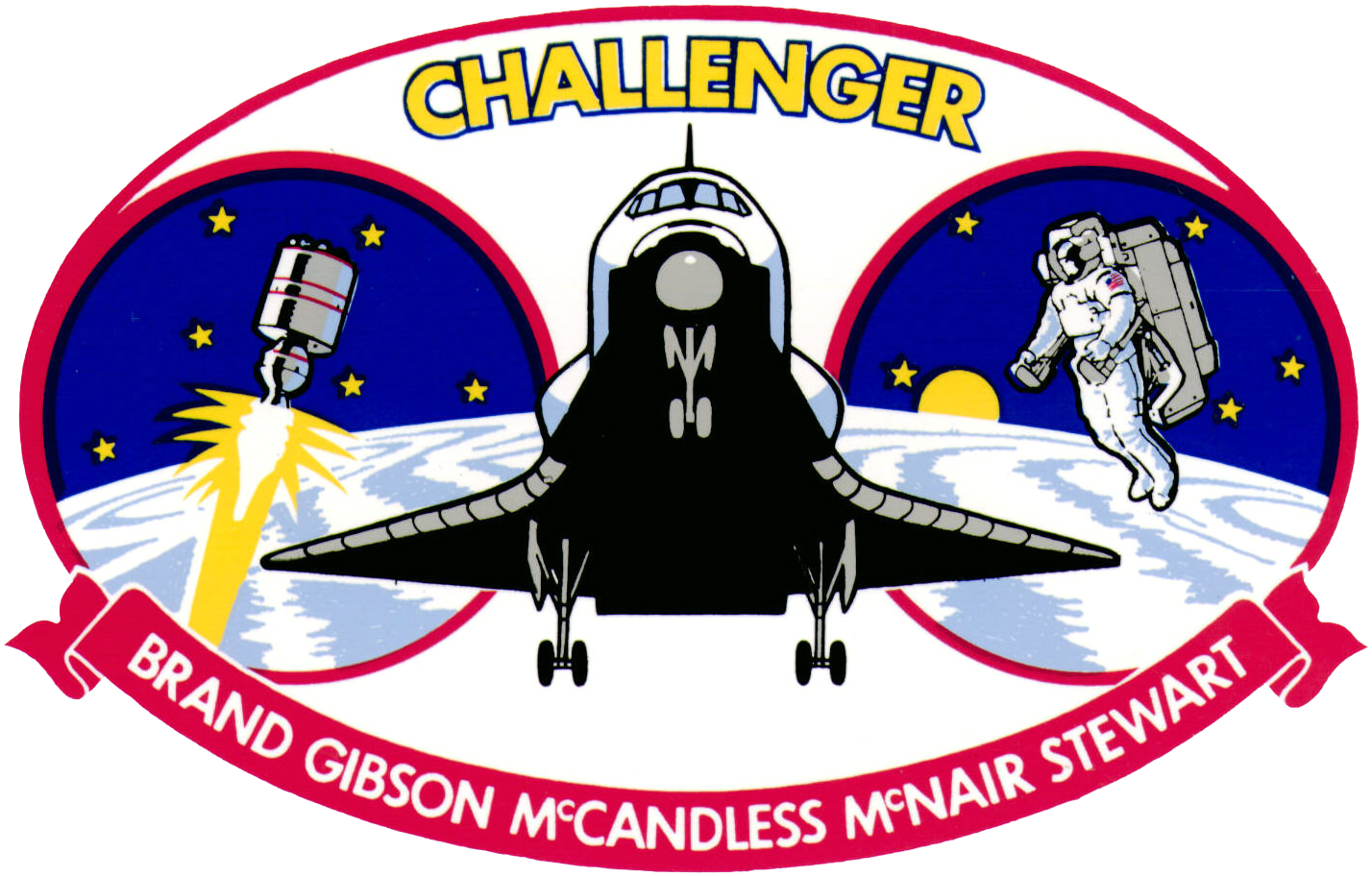
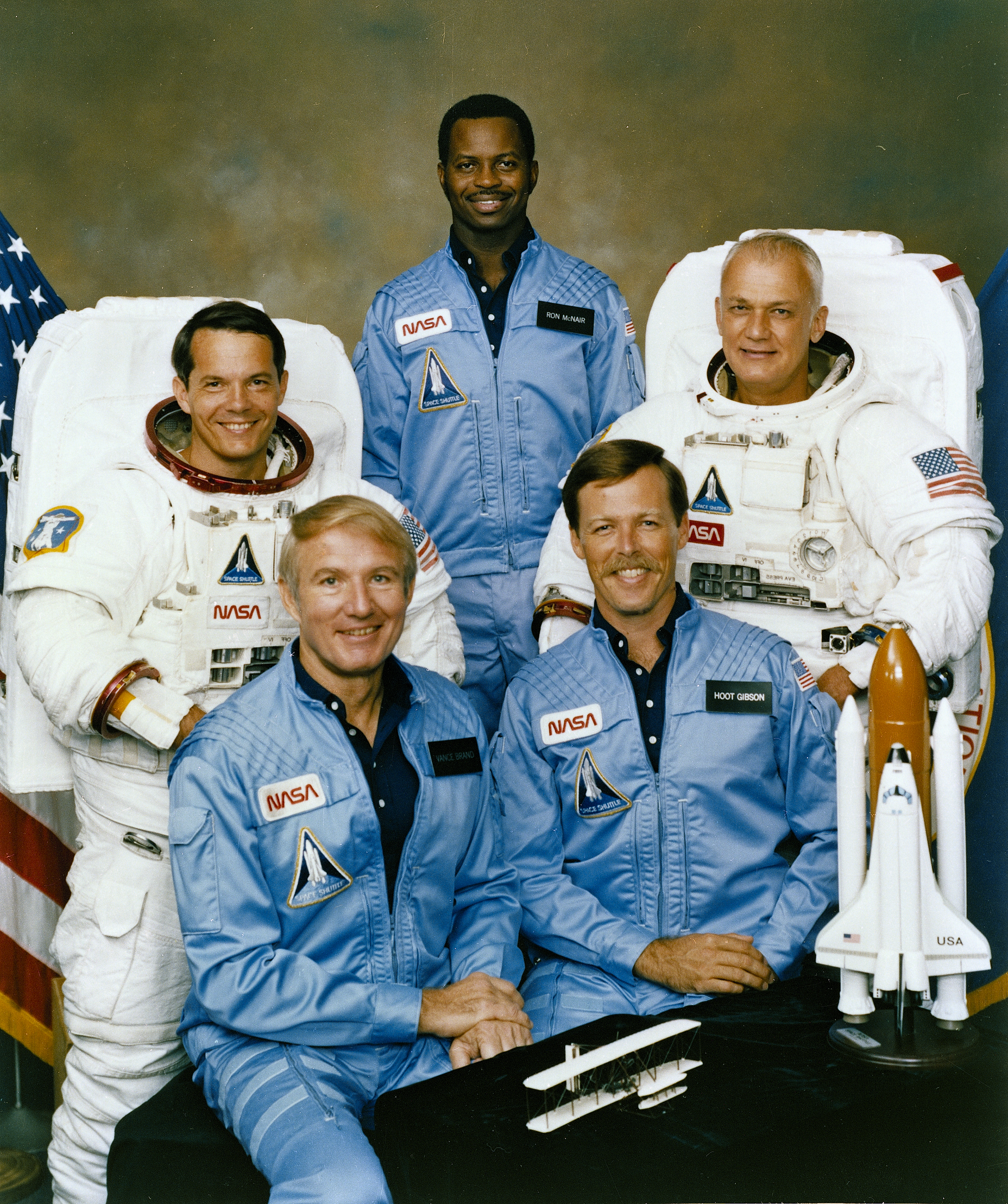
- STS-41-B mission patch Standing: Stewart, McNair and McCandless. Stewart and McCandless are wearing Extravehicular Mobility Units (EMUs). Seated: Brand and Gibson Space Shuttle program

STS-41-B was NASA's tenth Space Shuttle mission and the fourth flight of the Space Shuttle Challenger. It launched on February 3, 1984, and landed on February 11, 1984, after deploying two communications satellites. It included the first untethered spacewalk.

After STS-9, the flight numbering system for the Space Shuttle program was changed. Because the original successor to STS-9, STS-10, was canceled for payload delays, the next flight, originally and internally designated STS-11, became STS-41-B in the new numbering system.

== Crew ==
Position	Astronaut
Commander	Vance D. Brand; Third spaceflight
Pilot	Robert L. Gibson; First spaceflight
Mission Specialist 1	Bruce McCandless II; First spaceflight
Mission Specialist 2 Flight Engineer	Robert L. Stewart; First spaceflight
Mission Specialist 3	Ronald E. McNair; First space mission Only* spaceflight

=== Spacewalks ===
EVA 1

- Personnel: McCandless and Stewart
- Date: February 7, 1984
- Duration: 5 hours, 55 minutes

EVA 2

- Personnel: McCandless and Stewart
- Date: February 9, 1984
- Duration: 6 hours, 17 minutes

=== Crew seat assignments ===
Seat	Launch	Landing	Seats 1–4 are on the flight deck. Seats 5–7 are on the mid-deck.
1	Brand		Seats 1–4 are on the flight deck. Seats 5–7 are on the mid-deck.
2	Gibson		Seats 1–4 are on the flight deck. Seats 5–7 are on the mid-deck.
3	McNair	McCandless	Seats 1–4 are on the flight deck. Seats 5–7 are on the mid-deck.
4	Stewart		Seats 1–4 are on the flight deck. Seats 5–7 are on the mid-deck.
5	McCandless	McNair	Seats 1–4 are on the flight deck. Seats 5–7 are on the mid-deck.
6	Unused		Seats 1–4 are on the flight deck. Seats 5–7 are on the mid-deck.
7	Unused		Seats 1–4 are on the flight deck. Seats 5–7 are on the mid-deck.

== Mission summary ==
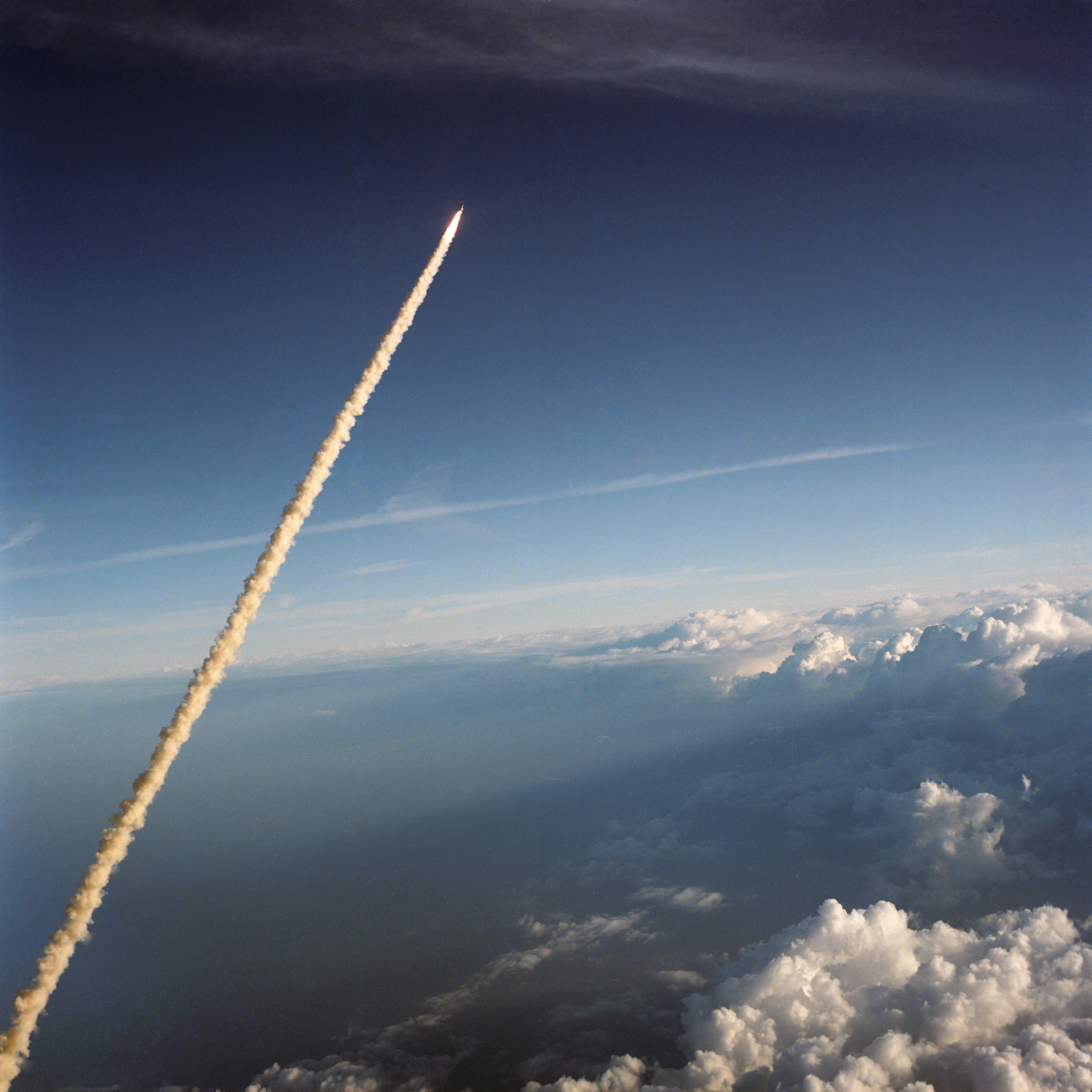
STS-41B launch

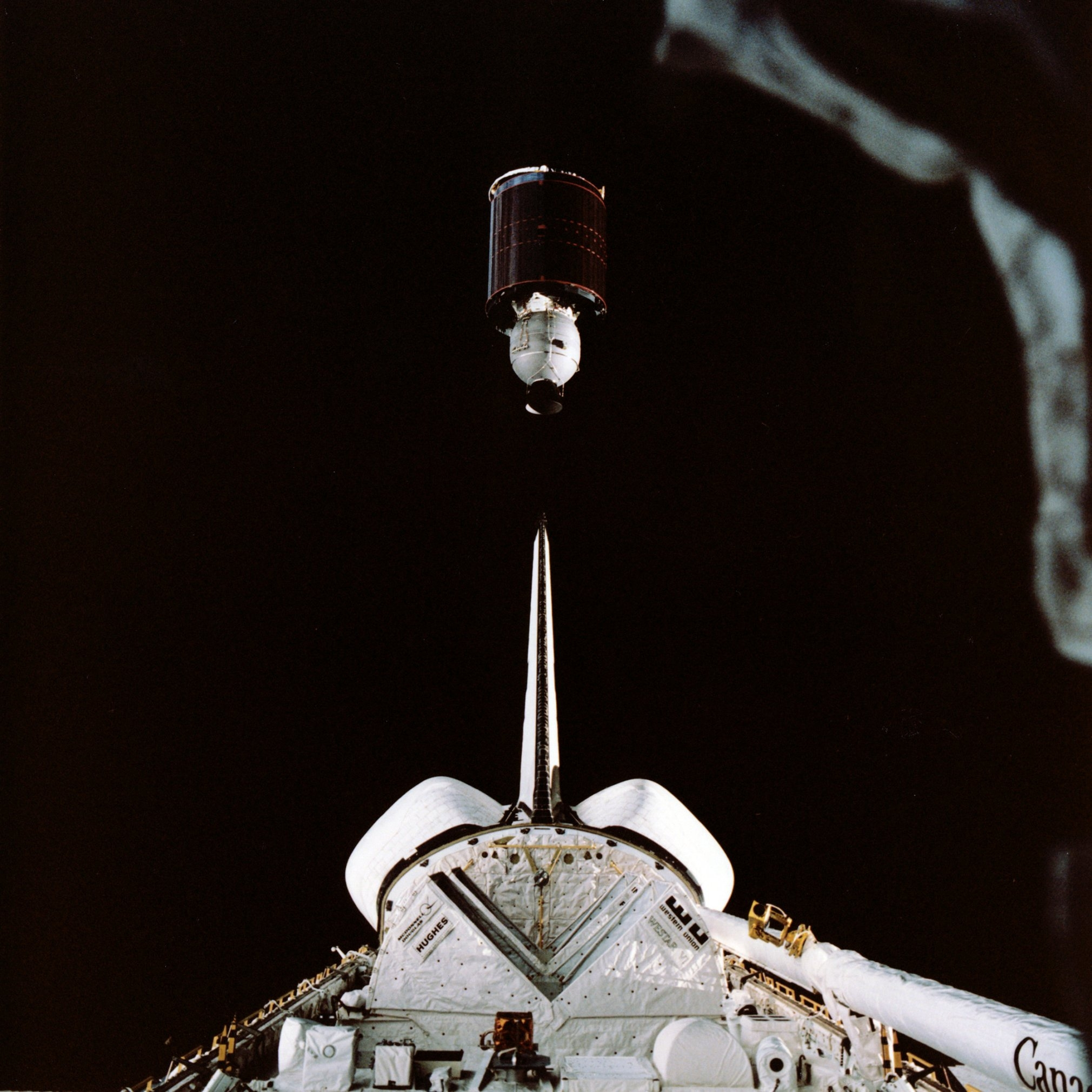
Palapa B2 after deployment

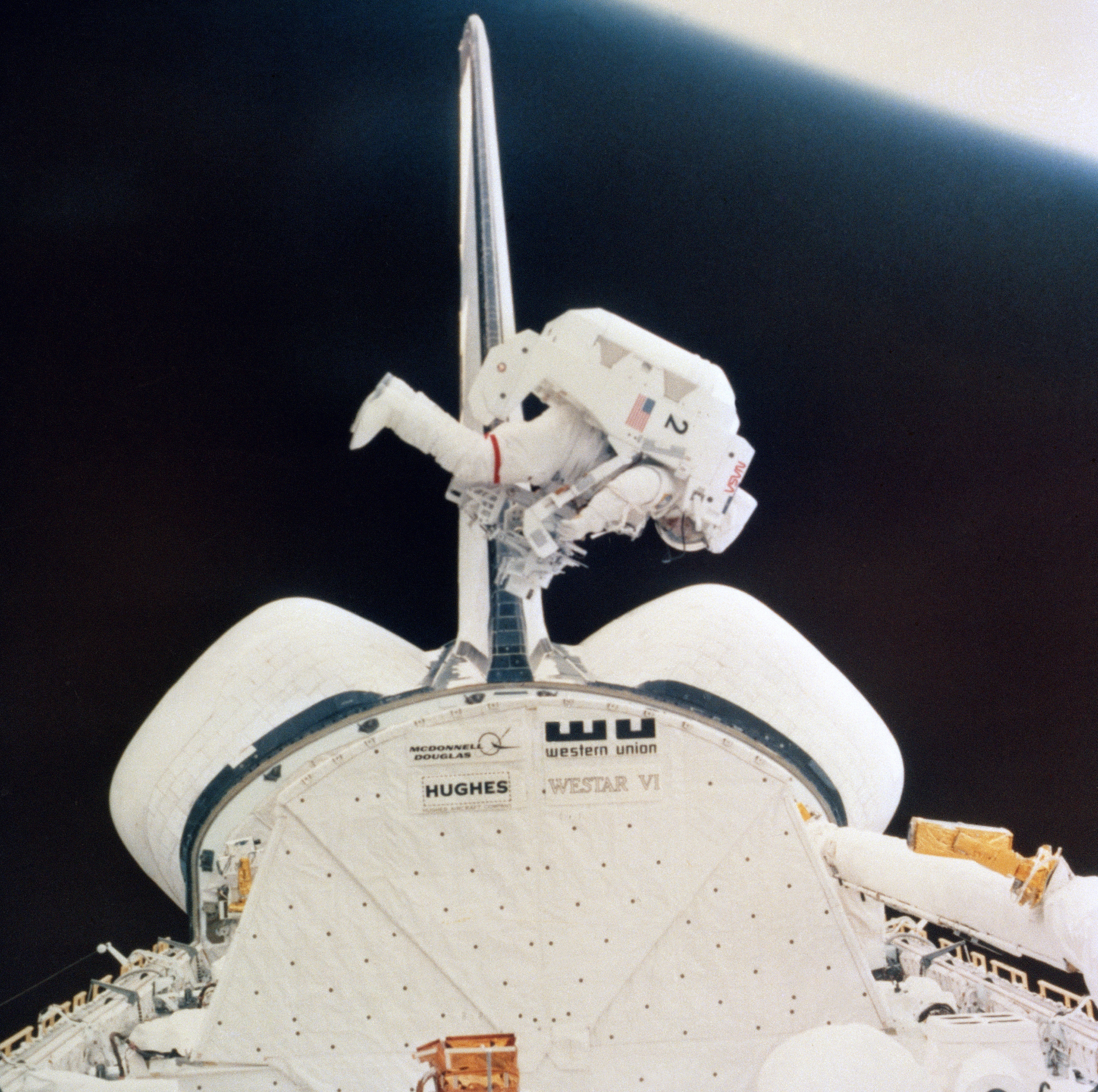
Astronaut Bruce McCandless exercises the Manned Maneuvering Unit.

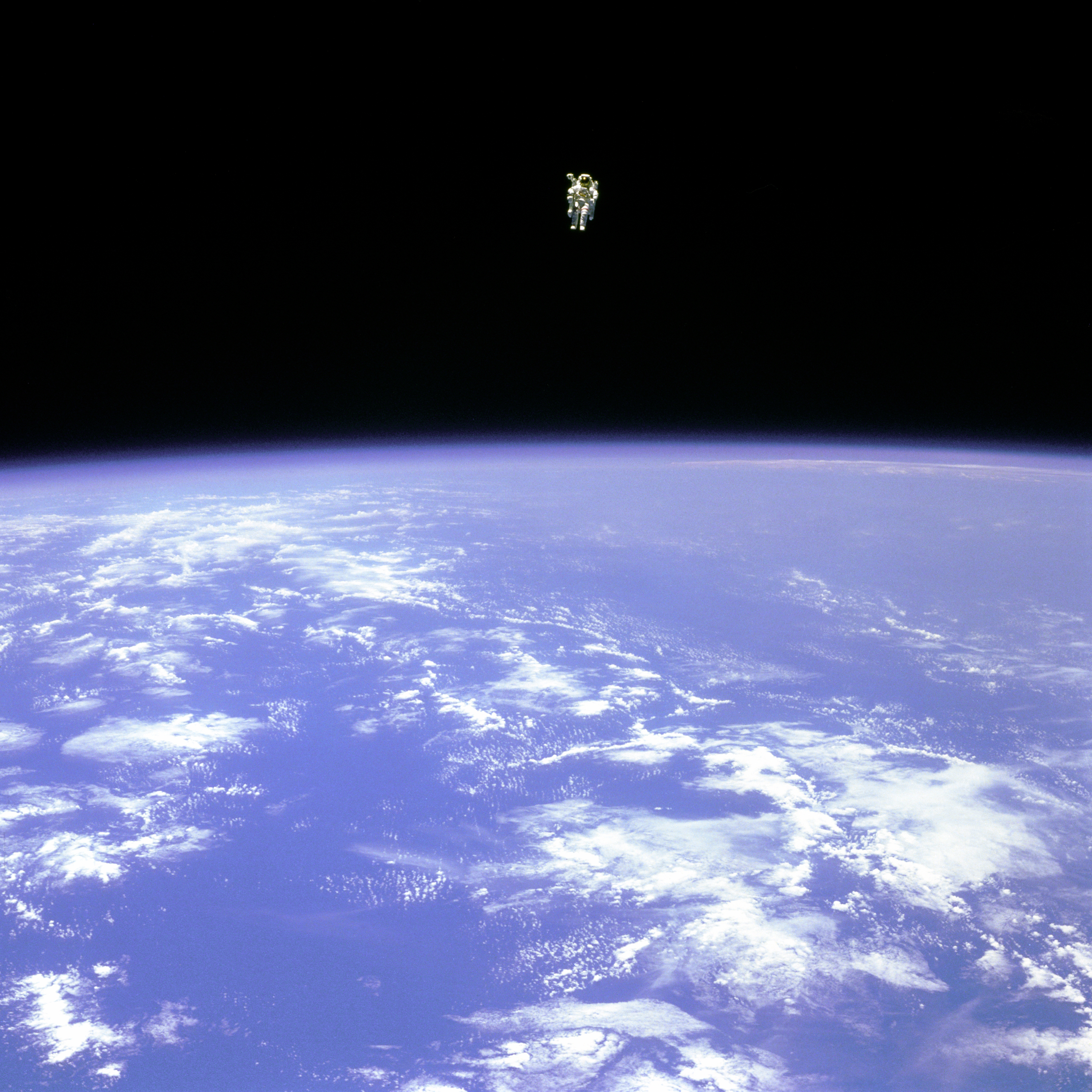
McCandless approaches his maximum distance from Challenger.

=== Crew ===
The STS-41-B crew included commander Vance D. Brand, making his second Shuttle flight; pilot Robert L. Gibson; and mission specialists Bruce McCandless II, Ronald E. McNair, and Robert L. Stewart.

=== Launch and satellite deployment ===
Challenger lifted off from Kennedy Space Center at 08:00:00 a.m. EST on February 3, 1984. It was estimated that 100,000 people attended the launch. Two communications satellites were deployed about 8 hours after launch; one, Westar 6, was for America's Western Union, and the other, Palapa B2, for Indonesia; both were Hughes-built HS-376-series satellites. However, the Payload Assist Modules (PAM) for both satellites malfunctioned, placing them into a lower-than-planned orbit. Both satellites were retrieved successfully in November 1984 during STS-51-A, which was conducted by the orbiter Discovery.

=== Untethered EVA ===
On February 7, the fourth day of the mission, astronauts McCandless and Stewart performed the first untethered spacewalk, operating the Manned Maneuvering Unit (MMU) for the first time. At 8:25 a.m. EST, pulsing the MMU's thrusters, McCandless ventured out of Challenger's payload bay, and reached 98 m (322 ft) from the orbiter. Stewart tested the "work station" foot restraint at the end of the Remote Manipulator System (Canadarm). On the seventh day of the mission, both astronauts performed another extravehicular activity (EVA) to practice capture procedures for the Solar Maximum Mission (SMM) satellite retrieval and repair operation, which was planned for the next mission, STS-41-C.

=== Scientific experiments ===
STS-41-B also achieved the reflight of the West German-sponsored SPAS-1 pallet/satellite, which had originally flown on STS-7. This time, however, it remained in the payload bay due to an electrical problem in the RMS (Canadarm). The mission also carried five Get Away Special (GAS) canisters, six live rats in the middeck area, a Cinema-360 camera and a continuation of the Continuous Flow Electrophoresis System and Monodisperse Latex Reactor experiments. Included in one of the GAS canisters was the first experiment designed and built by a high school team to fly in space. The experiment, on seed germination and growth in zero gravity, was created and built by a team of four students from Brighton High School in Utah through a partnership with Utah State University.

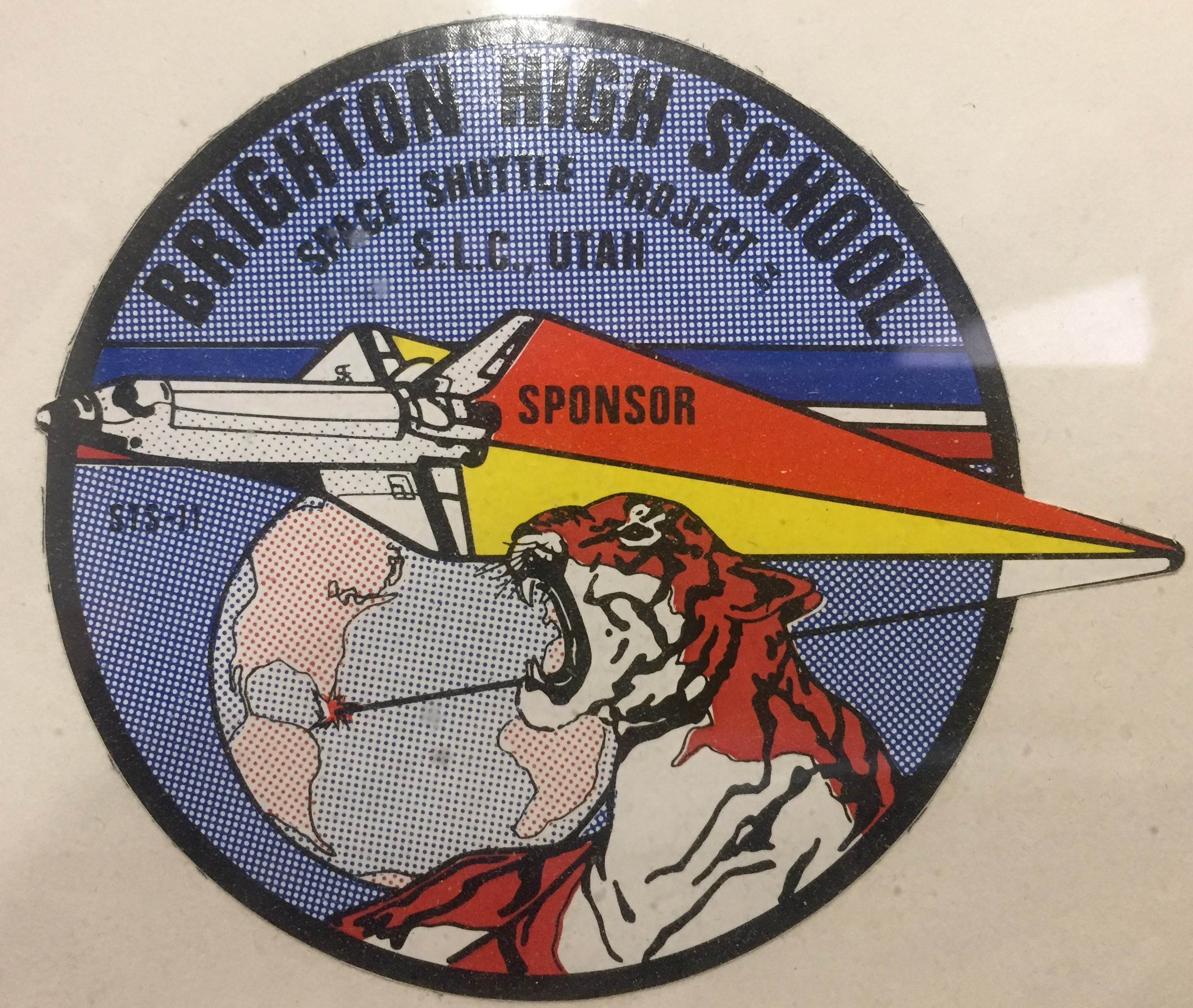
Brighton High School STS-11 Decal

=== Problems with the orbiter ===
During the mission, the nozzles of Challenger's supply and wastewater venting systems reached temperatures below freezing, after which the supply water dump valve failed to open, so excess water was dumped through the flash evaporator for the remainder of the mission. During re-entry, ice from the dump valves broke off their nozzles, near the nose of the orbiter, and struck the left Orbital Maneuvering System (OMS) pod, damaging three Thermal Protection System (TPS) tiles and leading to a burn-through, but the damage was little enough that Challenger and its crew were unharmed. During the post-flight inspection it was found that the dump line upstream of the two nozzles had ruptured because the wastewater had expanded as it froze, and insulation was missing around both nozzles. The TPS tiles near the nozzles were also discolored, indicating ice had built up before re-entry.

=== Return to Earth ===
The 7 days, 23 hours, 15 minutes, and 55 seconds flight ended on February 11, 1984 with a successful landing at Kennedy Space Center's Shuttle Landing Facility. This marked the first landing of a spacecraft at its launch site. Challenger completed 128 orbits and traveled 5,329,150 km (3,311,380 mi).

== Mission insignia ==
Designed by artist Robert McCall, the eleven stars in the blue field symbolize the mission's original designation as STS-11. The left panel shows the deployment of a satellite, and the right panel shows an astronaut using the MMU.

== Wake-up calls ==
NASA began a tradition of playing music to astronauts during the Project Gemini, and first used music to wake up a flight crew during Apollo 15. Each track is specially chosen, often by the astronauts' families, and usually has a special meaning to an individual member of the crew, or is applicable to their daily activities.

Flight day	Song	Artist/composer	Played for
Day 2	Garbled during the broadcast, title unknown	Contraband (Note: "Contraband" was the name of a music group of NASA employees, among them Ron McNair on the tenor sax.)	Ronald E. McNair
Day 3	"A Train"	Contraband	
Day 4	"Glory, Glory, Colorado" "Ride High You Mustangs"	The University of Colorado Band; Cal Poly San Luis Obispo / H.P. Davidson	Vance D. Brand; Robert L. Gibson
Day 5	"Armed Forces Medley"		Vance D. Brand; Bruce McCandless; Robert L. Gibson; Robert L. Stewart
Day 6	"North Carolina A&T University alma mater" "Southern Mississippi to the Top"	North Carolina A&T University; University of Southern Mississippi	Ronald E. McNair; Robert L. Stewart
Day 7	"Theme from The Greatest American Hero"	Joey Scarbury	A planned EVA
Day 8	"The Air Force Song"	U.S. Air Force CAPCOMs	
Day 9	"In the Mood"	Contraband	

== After the mission ==
Astronaut Bruce McCandless II sued singer Dido in 2010 over the use of a public domain photo of him in space on this mission on her 2008 album Safe Trip Home.

Two years after this mission, Ronald E. McNair was a crew member of the ill-fated STS-51-L. He and his six colleagues were killed when Challenger disintegrated 14 km (8.7 mi) above the Atlantic Ocean 73 seconds after liftoff.

== See also ==
- List of human spaceflights
- List of Space Shuttle missions
- Lists of spacewalks and moonwalks
