= Rob Stewart =

Rob Stewart may refer to:

- Rob Stewart (filmmaker) (1979–2017), Canadian filmmaker
- Rob Stewart (actor) (born 1961), Canadian actor

== See also ==
- Robert Stewart (disambiguation)
