= Robert Steward =

Robert Steward may refer to:

- Robert Steward (dean) (died 1557), English Benedictine prior of Ely, and first dean of Ely
- Robert Steward (MP) (1617–1672), English politician
- Robert Steward (diplomat) - see List of ambassadors of the United Kingdom to Colombia

== See also ==
- Robert the Steward, another name for Robert II of Scotland (1316–1390), King of Scots
- Robert Stewart (disambiguation)
