= Robert Stuart =

Robert Stuart may refer to:

- Robert Stuart, Duke of Kintyre and Lorne (1602–1602), fifth child of James VI of Scots and Anne of Denmark
- Robert Stuart, 11th Lord Blantyre (1777–1830), British Army officer
- Robert Stuart (judge), British Indian Judge
- Robert Stuart (explorer) (1785–1848), Scottish-born American fur trader
- Robert L. Stuart (1806–1882), American businessman and philanthropist
- Robert Stuart (British Army officer) (c. 1812–1901), British Army officer and veteran of the Crimean War
- Robert Stuart (businessman) (1852–1926), co-founder of the Quaker Oats Company
- Robert Y. Stuart (1883–1933), United States Forest Service administrator
- R. Douglas Stuart (1886–1975), United States businessman and United States ambassador to Canada
- Robert Stuart (cricketer) (1908–1986), Argentine cricketer
- Bobby Stuart (1913–1987), footballer
- Robert D. Stuart Jr. (1916–2014), Quaker Oats heir and founder of the 1940 America First Committee
- Robbie Stuart (1948-2025), New Zealand rugby player

== See also ==
- Bob Stuart (1920–2005), rugby union player
- Bob Stuart (rugby) (1887–1959), dual-code rugby player
- Robert Stewart (disambiguation)
- Bob Stewart (disambiguation)
