= Bob Stewart (footballer, born 1939) =

Australian rules footballer

Personal information
- Full name: Robert Val Stewart
- Born: 3 May 1939
- Died: 2 December 2015 (aged 76)
- Original team: Redan
- Height: 191 cm (6 ft 3 in)
- Weight: 83 kg (183 lb)

Playing career^{1}
| Years | Club | Games (Goals) |
| 1963 | North Melbourne | 7 (0) |
- ^{1} Playing statistics correct to the end of 1963.

Robert Val Stewart (3 May 1939 – 2 December 2015) was an Australian rules footballer who played with North Melbourne in the Victorian Football League (VFL).
