= Bob Stewart (footballer, born 1946) =

Australian rules footballer

Personal information
- Full name: Robert Stewart
- Born: 9 August 1946 (age 80)
- Original team: Keysborough
- Height: 188 cm (6 ft 2 in)
- Weight: 89 kg (196 lb)

Playing career^{1}
Years	Club	Games (Goals)
1966–67	Melbourne	17 (0)
- ^{1} Playing statistics correct to the end of 1967.

Bob Stewart (born 9 August 1946) is a former Australian rules footballer who played with Melbourne in the Victorian Football League (VFL).
