= Bob Stewart (footballer, born 1903) =

Australian rules footballer, born 1903

Personal information
- Full name: Robert Lee Stewart
- Born: 31 May 1903; Stawell, Victoria
- Died: 19 September 1965 (aged 62); Ararat, Victoria
- Original team: Williamstown
- Height: 179 cm (5 ft 10 in)
- Weight: 79 kg (174 lb)

Playing career^{1}
| Years | Club | Games (Goals) |
| 1922 | Richmond | 1 (0) |
- ^{1} Playing statistics correct to the end of 1922.

Robert Lee Stewart (31 May 1903 – 19 September 1965) was an Australian rules footballer who played with Richmond in the Victorian Football League (VFL).
