= Robert L. Stewart =

American brigadier general and astronaut (born 1942)

Robert Stewart
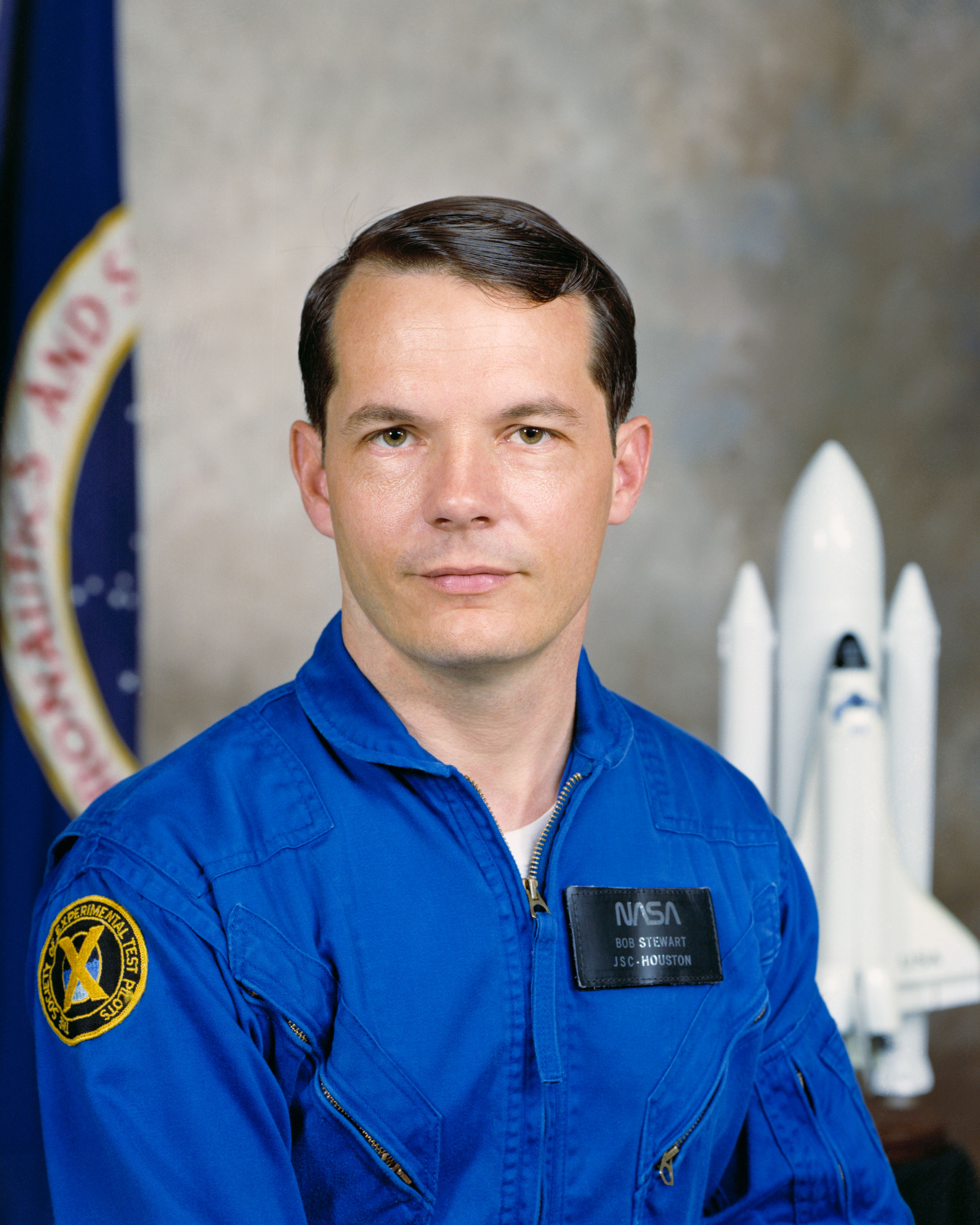
- Born: Robert Lee Stewart; August 13, 1942 (age 84); Washington, D.C., U.S.
- Education: University of Southern Mississippi (BS) University of Texas, Arlington (MS)
- Space career

NASA astronaut
- Rank: Brigadier General, USA
- Time in space: 12d 0h 49m
- Selection: NASA Group 8 (1978)
- Total EVAs: 2
- Total EVA time: 12h 12m
- Mission: STS-41-B; STS-51-J

Robert Lee Stewart (born August 13, 1942) is an American retired military officer and NASA astronaut who was a brigadier general of the United States Army.

== Personal ==
Stewart was born August 13, 1942, in Washington, D.C. He graduated from Hattiesburg High School in Hattiesburg, Mississippi, in 1960. He also received a Bachelor of Science degree in mathematics from the University of Southern Mississippi in 1964, and a Master of Science degree in aerospace engineering from the University of Texas at Arlington in 1972. Stewart is married and has two children.

His interests include woodworking, photography, and skiing.

== Military career ==
Stewart entered on active duty with the United States Army in May 1964 and was assigned as an air defense artillery director at the 32nd NORAD Region Headquarters (SAGE), Gunter Air Force Base, Alabama. In July 1966, after completing rotary wing training at Fort Wolters, Texas, and Fort Rucker, Alabama, he was designated an Army Aviator. He flew 1,035 hours of combat time during Vietnam War from August 1966 to 1967, primarily as a fire team leader in the armed helicopter platoon of "A" Company, 101st Aviation Battalion (redesignated 336th Assault Helicopter Company). He was an instructor pilot at the U.S. Army Primary Helicopter School—serving one year in the pre-solo/primary-1 phase of instruction and about 6 months as commander of methods of instruction flight III, training rated aviators to become instructor pilots. He is a graduate of the U.S. Army Air Defense Artillery School's Air Defense Officers Advanced Course and Guided Missile Systems Officers Course. Stewart served in Seoul, South Korea, from 1972 to 1973, with the 309th Aviation Battalion (Combat) as a battalion operations officer and battalion executive officer. He next attended the U.S. Naval Test Pilot School at NAS Patuxent River, Maryland, completing the Rotary Wing Test Pilot Course in 1974, and was then assigned as an experimental test pilot to the U.S. Army Aviation Engineering Flight Activity at Edwards Air Force Base, California. His duties there included chief of the integrated systems test division, as well as participating in engineering flight tests of UH-1 and AH-1 helicopters and U-21 and OV-1 fixed wing aircraft, serving as project officer and senior test pilot on the Hughes YAH-64 advanced attack helicopter during government competitive testing; and participation with Sikorsky Aircraft Corporation test pilots in developing an electronic automatic flight control system for the new Army transport helicopter—the UH-60A Black Hawk.

He has military and civilian experience in 38 types of airplanes and helicopters and logged approximately 6,000 hours total flight time.

== NASA career ==
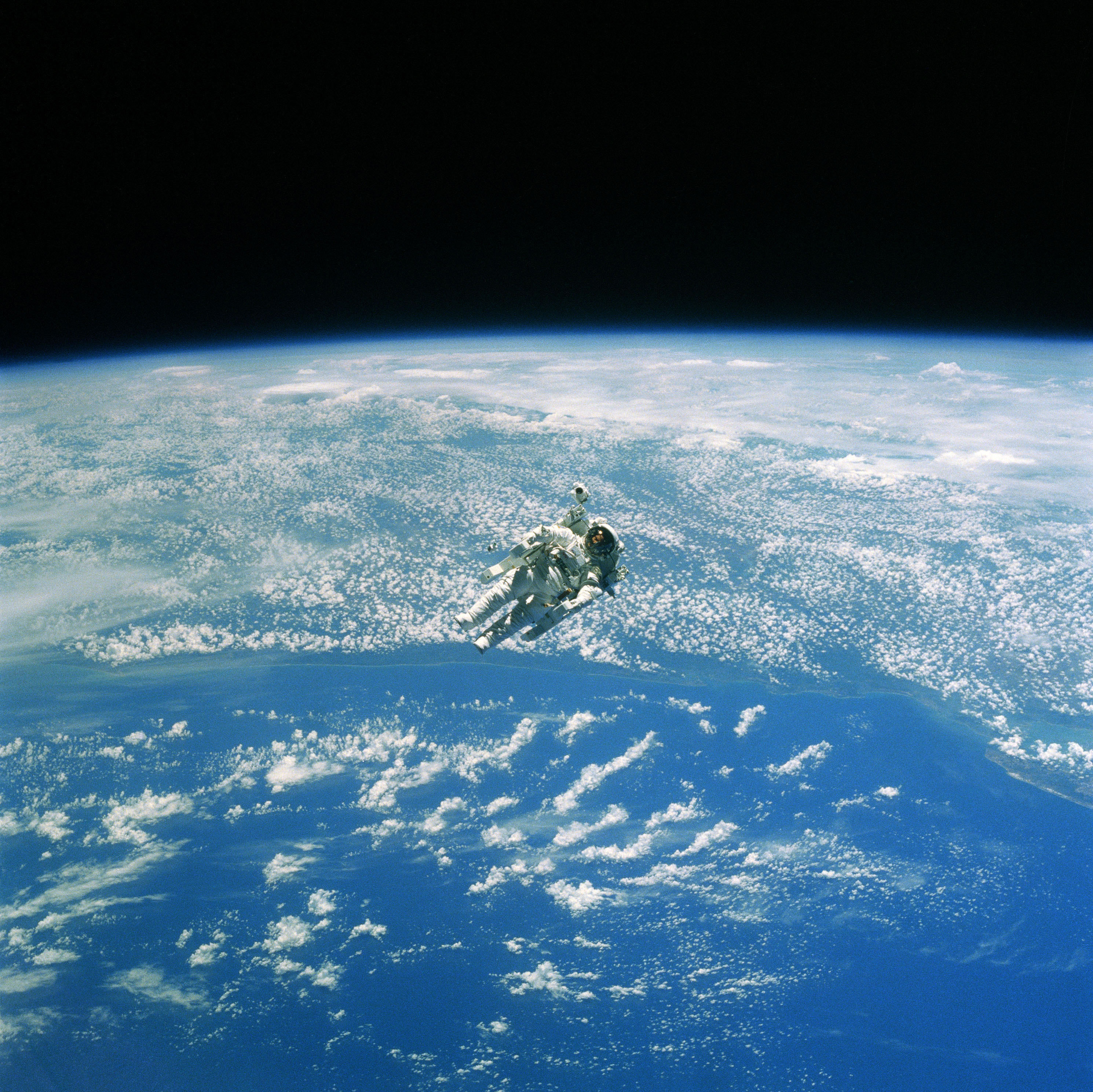
Robert L. Stewart

Selected as an astronaut candidate by NASA in January 1978, Stewart became a NASA astronaut in August 1979. His technical duties in the Astronaut Office included: testing and evaluation of the entry flight control systems for STS-1 (the first Space Shuttle orbital mission), ascent abort procedures development, and payload coordination. He also served as support crewman for STS-4, and Ascent/Orbit CAPCOM for STS-5. He served as a mission specialist on STS-41-B in 1984 and STS-51-J in 1985, and logged a total of 289 hours in space, including approximately 12 hours of EVA operations.

Although astronauts who had served in the United States Army Air Forces during World War II (including Gus Grissom and Deke Slayton) had previously flown, Stewart was the first active-duty Army officer to make a spaceflight.

While in training for his scheduled third flight (STS-61-K, ultimately cancelled as a result of the Challenger disaster) in 1986, Stewart was selected by the Army for promotion to brigadier general. Upon accepting this promotion, Stewart was reassigned from NASA to be the Deputy Commanding General, U.S. Army Strategic Defense Command, in Huntsville, Alabama. In this capacity, Stewart managed research efforts in developing ballistic missile defense technology. He was reassigned as Director of Plans, United States Space Command, Colorado Springs, Colorado, in 1989.

== Spaceflight experience ==
STS-41-B Challenger (February 3–11, 1984) was launched from Kennedy Space Center, Florida, and returned to land there 8 days later. During the mission, Stewart and fellow astronaut Bruce McCandless participated in two extravehicular activities (EVAs) to conduct first flight evaluations of the Manned Maneuvering Units (MMUs). These EVAs represented man's first untethered operations from a spacecraft in flight. Upon completion of this mission Stewart became the first Army officer awarded the Army Astronaut Badge.

Stewart’s first EVA, together with Bruce McCandless, lasted 6 hours and 17 minutes. During the second EVA, Stewart used the MMU for an untethered spacewalk, lasted 5 hours and 55 minutes.

STS-51-J Atlantis (October 3–7, 1985) was launched from Kennedy Space Center, Florida, and after 98 hours of orbital operations returned to land at Edwards Air Force Base, California. It was the second Space Shuttle Department of Defense mission, and the maiden voyage of Atlantis. During the mission, he was responsible for a number of on-orbit activities.

== Later career ==
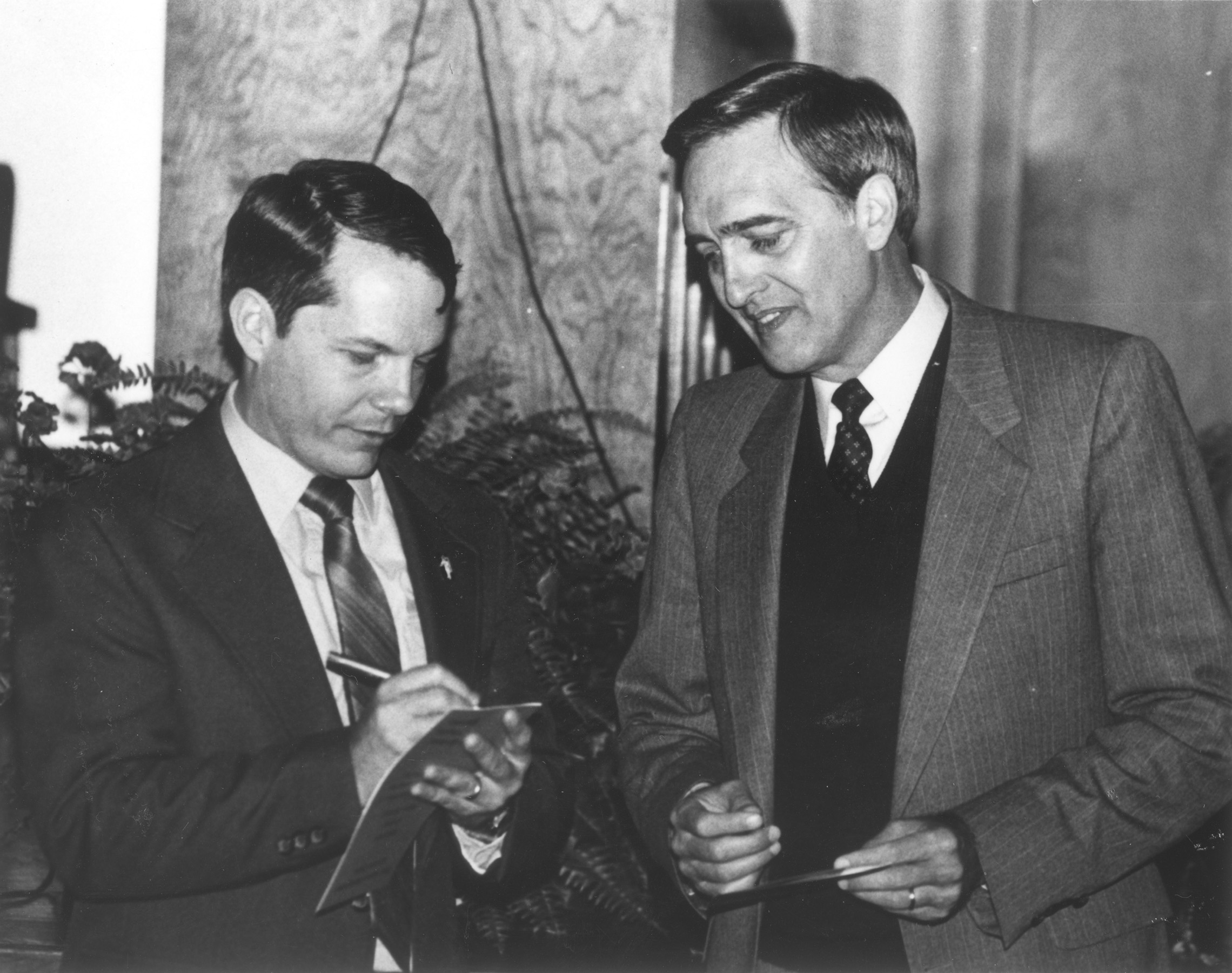
Stewart (left) with John Rouse, University of Texas at Arlington Dean of Engineering, 1984

Stewart retired from the Army in 1992 and made his home in Woodland Park, Colorado, for many years. He was employed as director of advanced programs at the Nichols Research Corporation in Colorado Springs, Colorado, before retiring. He later moved to Huntsville, Alabama, where he currently resides. He makes appearances at the U.S. Space & Rocket Center, greeting visitors and signing autographs.

== Organizations ==
He has been a member of the Society of Experimental Test Pilots, Association of Space Explorers, Phi Eta Sigma, and the Scabbard and Blade (a military honor society).

== Awards and honors ==
- Army Distinguished Service Medal
- Defense Superior Service Medal
- Legion of Merit with oak leaf cluster
- Distinguished Flying Cross with three oak leaf clusters
- Bronze Star
- Purple Heart with oak leaf cluster
- Meritorious Service Medal
- Air Medal with six silver oak leaf clusters and two bronze oak leaf clusters
- Army Commendation Medal with oak leaf cluster and Valor device
- NASA Space Flight Medals (1984 & 1985)
- National Defense Service Medal
- Armed Forces Expeditionary Medal
- Vietnam Service Medal
- Vietnam Cross of Gallantry
- Vietnam Campaign Medal
- Army Aviation Award of the Year, 1984
- AHS Feinberg Memorial Award
- AIAA Oberth Award
