= GSAT =

Series of Indian communications satellites

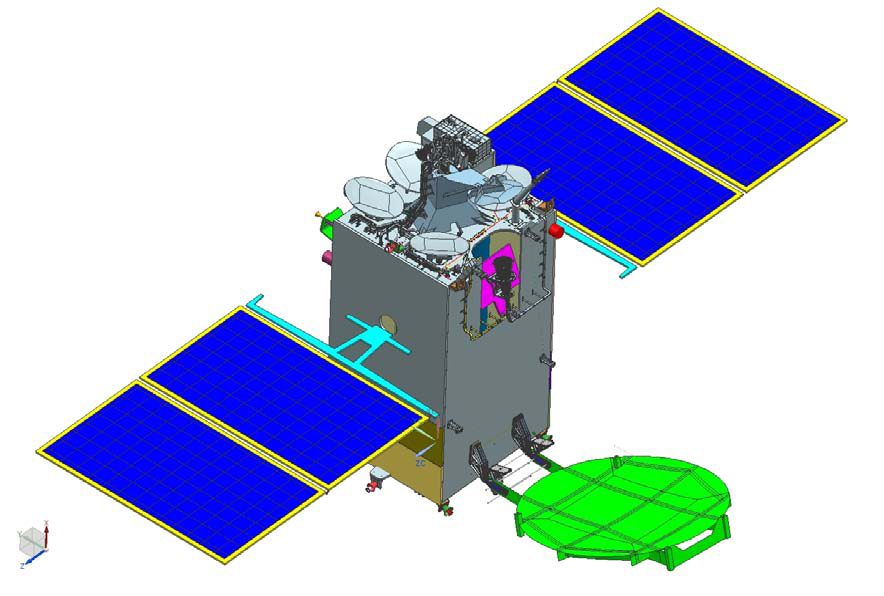
- The GSAT-7A, a military communications satellite, in deployed configuration
- Manufacturer: ISRO
- Country of origin: India
- Operator: INSAT
- Applications: Communications

Specifications
- Regime: Geostationary orbit

Production
- Status: In service
- On order: 6
- Built: 27
- Launched: 27
- Operational: 20
- Retired: 3
- Failed: 3
- Lost: 1
- Maiden launch: GSAT-1 (GramSat-1) 18 April 2001
- Last launch: GSAT-7R (CMS-03) 2 November 2025

The GSAT (Geosynchronous Satellite) series is a family of Indian communications satellites, indigenously developed and operated by the ISRO. The prorgamme was initiated in the early 2000s to create indigenous, multi-purpose, geostationary spacecraft capable of supporting India's growing needs in telecommunications, broadcasting, broadband, emergency management, reconnaissance and navigation. The programme was supported by the development of Geosynchronous Satellite Launch Vehicle.

GSAT satellites include a total of 168 transponders (out of which 95 are leased out to provide services to broadcasters), and operate primarily in C, Extended C, K_{u}, K_{a}, S and L bands, with payload configurations tailored for civilian, commercial, and strategic needs. The development of both GSAT satellites and the GSLV launch system represents India's transition from dependence on foreign-built INSAT spacecraft to self-reliant national communications capability. As of 21 November 2025, 27 GSAT satellites manufactured by ISRO have been launched, out of which 20 are in service and six more being planned.

== History ==
The GSAT programme began as part of ISRO's efforts to supplement the aging Indian National Satellite System (INSAT) fleet and reduce reliance on leased transponders from foreign satellites. Early missions of GSAT-1 (2001) and GSAT-2 (2003) were launched to test indigenous bus designs, power systems and communication payloads.

Between 2004 and 2020, ISRO launched numerous GSAT satellites with varied roles including direct-to-home broadcasting support, tele-education and tele-medicine, high-throughput broadband, navigation augmentation for aviation, dedicated military communication.

Recent missions focus on high-bandwidth K_{a} band systems, secure strategic communication and navigation augmentation under GPS-aided GEO augmented navigation (GAGAN). Several satellites use advanced I-2K, I-3K and 1-6K satellite bus platforms designed for long life and high payload capacity.

== Launched ==
The following is a list of launched GSAT satellites and their status. As of 2025, there were 27 GSAT launches with 20 of them being operational.

Launched GSAT satellites
GSAT series	INSAT Series	Other name(s)	COSPAR ID	Launch date and time, UTC	Launch vehicle	Lift-off mass	Orbital parameters		Outcome	Purpose
GSAT series	INSAT Series	Other name(s)	COSPAR ID	Launch date and time, UTC	Launch vehicle	Lift-off mass	Longitude	Inclination	Outcome	Purpose
GSAT-1	—N/a	GramSat-1	2001-015A	18 April 2001, 10:13:00	(India) GSLV Mk-I D2	1,540 kg (3,400 lb)	76.85° West (2006–2009) (Note: Previously: 73° West (2000) and 99° West (2000–2006))	0.9°	Launch failure	Experimental
GSAT-1	—N/a	Launch placed it into lower than planned orbit, which prevented it from fulfilling its primary communications mission.								
GSAT-2	—N/a	GramSat-2	2003-018A	8 May 2003, 11:28:00	(India) GSLV Mk-I D3	1,825 kg (4,023 lb)	47.95° East	2.43°	Successful	Experimental
GSAT-2	—N/a	Second experimental attempt.								
GSAT-3	—N/a	EduSat	2004-036A	20 September 2004, 10:31:00	(India) GSLV Mk-I F01	1,950 kg (4,300 lb)	74° East	2.71°	Successful	Educational
GSAT-3	—N/a	Mainly intended to meet the demand for an interactive satellite-based distance education system for the country. Decommissioned on 30 September 2010 after six years of operation.								
GSAT-4	—N/a	HealthSat	—N/a	15 April 2010, 10:57:00	(India) GSLV Mk-II D3	2,220 kg (4,890 lb)	82° East	—N/a	Launch failure	Communication and Navigation
GSAT-4	—N/a	Failed to reach orbit due to malfunction of the Fuel Booster Turbo Pump (FBTP) of the cryogenic upper stage.								
GSAT-5P	—N/a		—N/a	25 December 2010, 10:34:00	(India) GSLV Mk-I F06	2,310 kg (5,090 lb)	55° East	—N/a	Launch failure	Replacement of INSAT-3E
GSAT-5P	—N/a		Rebuilt from GSAT-5 (INSAT-4D) Vehicle was destroyed by range safety officer after loss of control over liquid-fueled boosters.							
GSAT-6	INSAT-4E	—N/a	2015-041A	27 August 2015, 11:22:00	(India) GSLV Mk-II D6	2,132 kg (4,700 lb)	83° East	1.4°	Operational	Multimedia
GSAT-6	INSAT-4E	—N/a	A multimedia mobile satellite system; offers a Satellite Digital Multimedia Broadcasting (S-DMB) service, via mobile phones and mobile video/audio receivers for vehicles; can also be utilized for strategic and social applications.							
GSAT-6A	—N/a		2018-027A	29 March 2018, 11:26:00	(India) GSLV Mk-II F08	2,140 kg (4,720 lb)	83° East	2.8°	Communication failure	Communication
GSAT-6A	—N/a		Communication with the satellite was lost after the second orbit raising manoeuvre. Efforts are on to re-establish link but at this point it remains incommunicado.							
GSAT-7	INSAT-4F	Rukmini	2013-044B	29 August 2013, 20:30:00	(France) Ariane 5 ECA VA-215	2,650 kg (5,840 lb)	74° East	0.06°	Operational	Military
GSAT-7	INSAT-4F	Rukmini	According to defense experts, it was built to enable the Indian Navy to acquire blue water capabilities and remove dependence on foreign satellites like Inmarsat, which provide communication services to its ships.							
GSAT-7A	—N/a	Angry Bird	2018-105A	19 December 2018, 10:40:00	(India) GSLV Mk-II F11	2,250 kg (4,960 lb)	63° East	0.0°	Operational	Military
GSAT-7A	—N/a	Angry Bird	Advanced military communications satellite meant exclusively for the Indian Air Force along with the Indian Army.							
GSAT-7R	—N/a	CMS-03	2025-249B	2 November 2025, 11:56:00	(India) LVM3 M5	4,410 kg (9,720 lb)	93.5° East	0.2°	Operational	Military
GSAT-7R	—N/a	CMS-03	Replacement for GSAT-7 Rukmini for Indian Navy.							
GSAT-8	INSAT-4G	GramSat-8	2011-022A	20 May 2011, 20:38:00	(France) Ariane 5 ECA VA-202	3,093 kg (6,819 lb)	55° East	1.6°	Operational	Navigation
GSAT-8	INSAT-4G	GramSat-8	To augment the capacity in the INSAT system; the GAGAN payload provides the Satellite Based Augmentation System (SBAS), through which the accuracy of the positioning information obtained from the IRNSS (NAVIC) satellites is improved by a network of ground-based receivers and made available to users in the country through the geostationary satellites.							
GSAT-9	—N/a	South Asia Satellite	2017-024A	5 May 2017, 11:27:00	(India) GSLV MK-II F09	2,330 kg (5,140 lb)	48° East	0.0413°	Operational	Navigation
GSAT-9	—N/a	South Asia Satellite	Carried GAGAN navigation payload, a regional IRNSS (NAVIC) navigational system developed by India, that provides navigational services to the security forces and air traffic control organizations.							
GSAT-10	—N/a		2012-051B	29 September 2012	(France) Ariane 5 ECA VA-209	3,435 kg (7,573 lb)	83° East	0.1°	Operational	Navigation
GSAT-10	—N/a		To augment telecommunication, direct-to-home and radio navigation services.							
GSAT-11	—N/a		2018-100B	4 December 2018, 20:37:00	(France) Ariane 5 ECA VA-246	5,854 kg (12,906 lb)	74° East	0.0°	Operational	Telecom
GSAT-11	—N/a		Aimed at providing advanced telecom and direct-to-home services in the country. Heaviest satellite built by India at the time.							
GSAT-12	—N/a	GramSat-12	2018-100B	July 15, 2011	(India) PSLV-XL C17	1,412 kg (3,113 lb)	74° East	0.0°	Successful	Multipurpose
GSAT-12	—N/a	GramSat-12	Replacement of the INSAT-3B; provided services like tele-education, telemedicine, disaster management support and satellite internet access. Only GSAT satellite to be launched by PSLV.							
GSAT-12R	—N/a	CMS-01	2020-099A	17 December 2020, 11:18:00	(India) PSLV-XL C50	1,425 kg (3,142 lb)	83° East	0.1°	Operational	Multipurpose
GSAT-12R	—N/a	CMS-01	Replacement of GSAT-12.							
GSAT-14	—N/a		2014-001A	5 January 2014, 10:48:00	(India) GSLV Mk-II D5	1,982 kg (4,370 lb)	75° East	0.1°	Operational	Communications
GSAT-14	—N/a		Replacement of GSAT-3.							
GSAT-15	—N/a		2015-065A	10 November 2015, 21:34:07	(France) Ariane 5 ECA VA-227	3,100 kg (6,800 lb)	93.5° East	0.0728°	Operational	Communications
GSAT-15	—N/a		Similar to GSAT-10 satellite; to augment the capacity of transponders to provide more bandwidth for direct-to-home television and VSAT services.							
GSAT-16	—N/a		2014-078A	6 December 2014, 20:40:00	(France) Ariane 5 ECA VA-221	3,150 kg (6,940 lb)	55° East	0.0°	Operational	Communications
GSAT-16	—N/a		The communication payloads provide a combination of total 48 transponders across the three frequency bands (24 in Normal C band, 12 in Extended-C band and 12 in K_{u}-band) along with a K_{u}-band beacon transmitter, which is the highest for an Indian satellite. The spacecraft will be co-located with GSAT-8 at 55° East.							
GSAT-17	—N/a		2017-040B	28 June 2017, 21:15:00	(France) Ariane 5 ECA VA-238	3,477 kg (7,665 lb)	93.5° East	0.0°	Operational	Communications
GSAT-17	—N/a		Payload includes 24 C-band, 2 lower C-band, 12 upper C-band, 2 CxS (C-band up/S-band down), and 1 SxC (S-band up/C-band down) transponders as well as a dedicated transponder for data relay (DRT) and search-and-rescue (SAR) services.							
GSAT-18	—N/a		2016-060A	5 October 2016, 20:30:00	(France) Ariane 5 ECA VA-231	3,404 kg (7,505 lb)	74° East	0.1°	Operational	Communications
GSAT-18	—N/a		To provide services in Normal C-band, Upper Extended C-band and K_{u} bands of the frequency spectrum.							
GSAT-19	—N/a		2017-031A	5 June 2017, 11:58:00	(India) LVM3 D1	3,136 kg (6,914 lb)	48° East	0.101°	Operational	Communications
GSAT-19	—N/a		Rather than traditional transponders, GSAT-19 carries four K_{u}/K_{a}-band forward link beams and four K_{u}/K_{a}-band return link beams, providing much higher data throughput than India's previous communications satellites.							
GSAT-20	—N/a	GSAT-N2	2024-214A	18 November 2024, 18:30:00	(United States) Falcon 9 Block 5 F9-398	5,300 kg (11,700 lb)	55° East	0.101°	Operational	Communications
GSAT-20	—N/a	GSAT-N2	Entire capacity of the satellite leased to Dish TV.							
GSAT-24	—N/a	GSAT-N1	2022-067A	22 June 2022, 21:50:00	(France) Ariane 5 ECA VA-257	4,181 kg (9,218 lb)	48° East	TBD	Operational	Communications
GSAT-24	—N/a	GSAT-N1	The entire capacity onboard GSAT-N1 satellite would be leased to Tata Play.							
GSAT-29	—N/a		2018-089A	14 November 2018, 11:38:00	(India) LVM3 D2	3,423 kg (7,546 lb)	55° East	0.0°	Operational	Communications
GSAT-29	—N/a		The mission aims at providing high-speed bandwidth to Village Resource Centres (VRC) in rural areas.							
GSAT-30	—N/a		2020-005A	17 January 2020, 21:05:00	(France) Ariane 5 ECA VA-251	3,547 kg (7,820 lb)	83° East	0.0°	Operational	Communications
GSAT-30	—N/a		Replacement satellite for INSAT-4A.							
GSAT-31	—N/a		2019-007B	6 February 2019	(France) Ariane 5 ECA VA-251	2,536 kg (5,591 lb)	48° East	0.1°	Operational	Telecom
GSAT-31	—N/a		This is the 40th communication satellite launched by ISRO.							

== Planned ==
The following is a list of six planned GSAT launches.

Planned GSAT Satellites
GSAT series	INSAT Series	Other name(s)	Launch date	Launch vehicle	Lift-off mass	Status	Purpose							
GSAT series	INSAT Series	Other name(s)	Launch date	Launch vehicle	Lift-off mass	Status	Purpose	GSAT-7C	—N/a	2030s	(India) GSLV Mk-II	TBD	Planned	Military
Military communication satellite for Indian Air Force.								GSAT-7C	—N/a					
GSAT-7B	—N/a		April 2028	(India) GSLV Mk-II	TBD	Planned	Military							
GSAT-7B	—N/a		Military communication satellite for Indian Army.											
GSAT-22	—N/a		2020s	(India) LVM3	TBD	Planned	Communication							
GSAT-22	—N/a		Communication satellite.											
GSAT-23	—N/a		2020s	(India) LVM3	TBD	Planned	TBD							
GSAT-32	—N/a	GSAT-N3	Q2 2026	(India) LVM3	4,500 kg (9,900 lb)	Planned	Communication							
GSAT-32	—N/a	GSAT-N3	Replacement of GSAT-6A.											

== Statistics ==
As of 23 November 2025

=== Launches by year ===
- Success
- Partial failure
- Failure
- Planned

=== Launches by rocket ===
- Ariane 5
- GSLV MKI
- GSLV MKII
- LVM3
- PSLV
- Falcon 9 Block 5

=== Launches by country ===
Country	Launches	Successes	Failures	Partial failures
France	12	12	0	0
India	14	10	3	1
United States	1	1	0	0
Total	27	23	3	1

== See also ==
- List of Indian satellites
- Indian National Satellite System (INSAT)
- Indian Remote Sensing Programme (IRSP)
- Indian Regional Navigation Satellite System (IRNSS)
