= GSAT-32 =

- Mission type: Communication
- Operator: ISRO
- Mission duration: 15 years (planned)

Spacecraft properties
- Bus: I-4K
- Manufacturer: U. R. Rao Satellite Centre
- Launch mass: ~4,000 kilograms (8,800 lb)

Start of mission
- Launch date: Q2 2026
- Rocket: LVM3
- Launch site: Satish Dhawan Space Centre
- Contractor: ISRO

Orbital parameters
- Reference system: Geocentric orbit
- Regime: Geostationary orbit

GSAT-32 (also known as GSAT-N3) is an Indian geostationary communications satellite developed by ISRO.

== History ==
In 2021, GSAT-32 was announced as one of five new GSAT satellites under the GSAT-N Series, other four being GSAT-20, 22, 23, and 24. The satellite is planned to serves as a replacement for the GSAT-6A satellite.

== See also ==
- GSAT-7A
- GSAT
- Indian National Satellite System
- List of Indian satellites
