= INSAT-4E =

Indian communication satellite

INSAT 4E
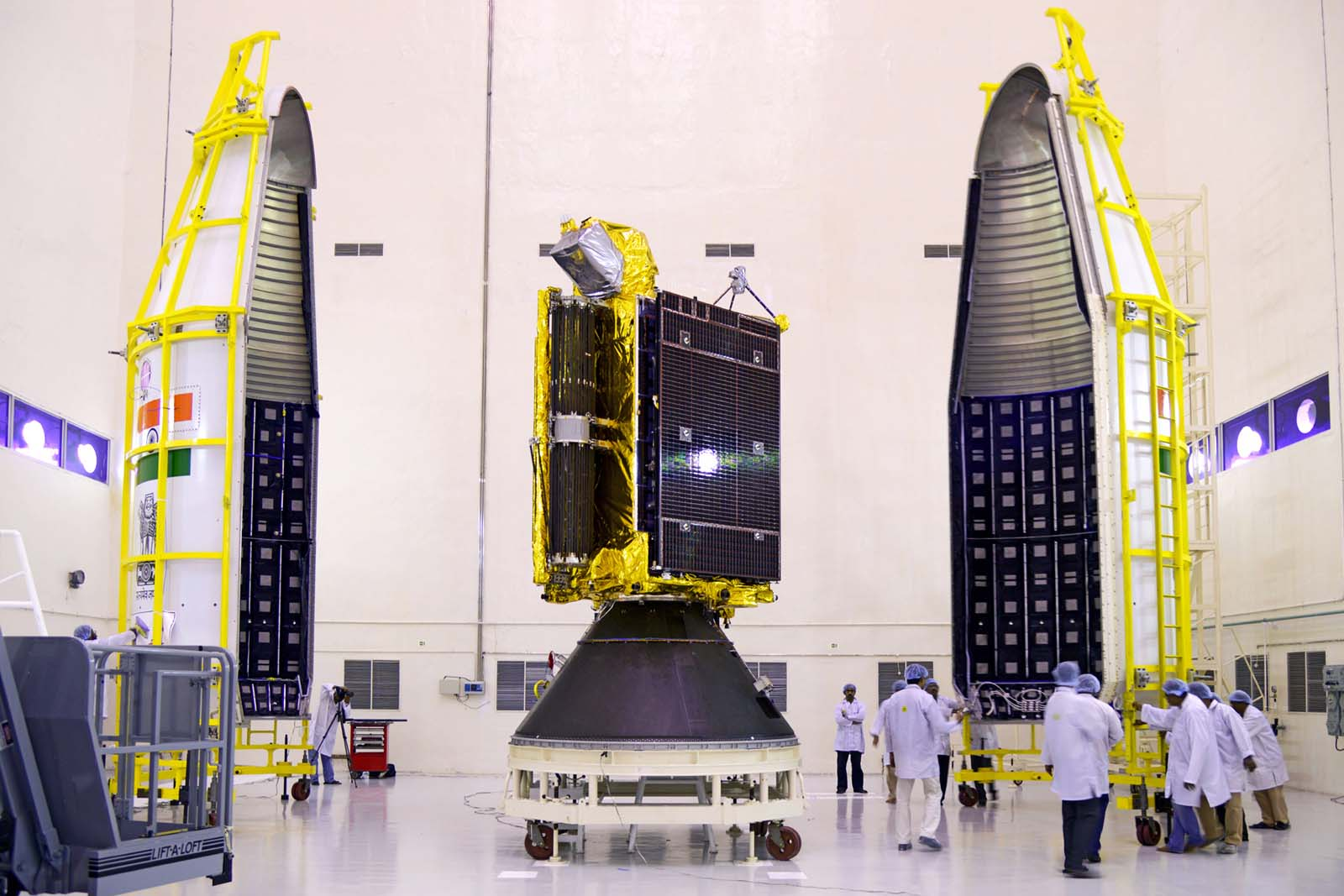
- GSAT-6 seen with two halves of payload faring of GSLV-D6
- Mission type: Communication
- Operator: INSAT
- COSPAR ID: 2015-041A
- SATCAT no.: 40880
- Website: https://www.isro.gov.in/Spacecraft/gsat-6
- Mission duration: Planned: 9 years Elapsed: 11 years, 1 month, 22 days

Spacecraft properties
- Bus: I-2K
- Manufacturer: ISRO Satellite Centre; Space Applications Centre
- Launch mass: 2,117 kilograms (4,667 lb)
- Dry mass: 985 kg (2,172 lb)
- Power: 3.1 kilowatts

Start of mission
- Launch date: 27 August 2015, 11:22 UTC
- Rocket: GSLV Mk.II D6
- Launch site: Satish Dhawan SLP
- Contractor: ISRO

Orbital parameters
- Reference system: Geocentric
- Regime: Geostationary
- Longitude: 83°E
- Epoch: Planned

Transponders
- Band: 5, C x S transponders (9 megahertz bandwidth); 5, S x C transponders (2.7 megahertz bandwidth)

INSAT-4E, also known as GSAT-6, is a member of the INSAT family and is a multimedia communication satellite that will offer a Satellite Digital Multimedia Broadcasting (S-DMB) service across several digital multimedia terminals or consoles which can be used to provide information services to cellular devices and vehicle-mounted receivers. The satellite can be used for other social and strategic applications.

== Satellite ==
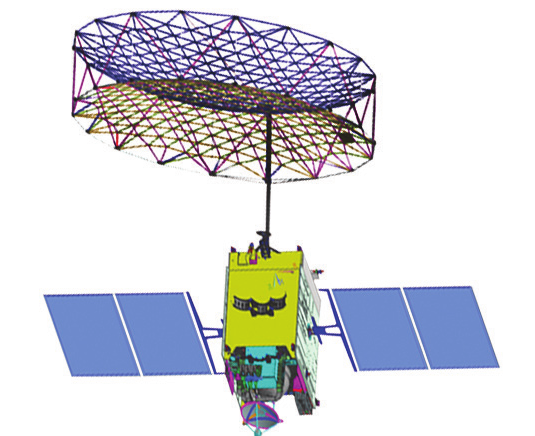
Render of GSAT-6 spacecraft in deployed configuration

INSAT-4E has five C x S transponders each of 9 MHz bandwidth and five S x C transponders each of 2.7 MHz bandwidth which will together cover the entire country. GSAT-6 uses a 0.8 metres [2 ft 7 in] (fixed) and one 6 metres (20 ft) S-Band unfurlable antenna (transmit and receive).

The unfurlable antenna weighing 18 kilograms (40 lb) has CFRP truss construction with aluminium alloy joints and its parabolic gold plated molybdenum mesh is supported and shaped by cable mesh structures.

The cost of GSAT-6 satellite is ₹232 crore and it is identical in configuration to GSAT-6A which was launched later.

== Launch ==
ISRO successfully launched INSAT-4E on 27 August 2015, using a GSLV D6 Mk.II rocket flying from the Satish Dhawan Space Centre and inserted into a Geostationary Transfer Orbit (GTO) with injection parameters of 170 by 35,945 kilometres (106 mi × 22,335 mi), 19.96 degree inclination. The cost of launch vehicle was around ₹276 crore.

== Orbit raising ==
Maneuvers to move the satellite into its designated geosynchronous orbit at 83 degrees East longitude were initiated on 28 August 2015 by firing motors on board the GSAT-6 satellite.

The GSAT-6 satellite's Liquid Apogee Motor (LAM) was fired for 3385 seconds at 08:35 hours IST on August 28 during the first orbit raising operation and modified the satellite orbit to 8,408 kilometres (5,224 mi) (perigee height) by 35,708 kilometres (22,188 mi) (apogee height) with an inclination of 7.5 degree and an orbital period of 13 hours, 15 minutes and 24 seconds.

Second orbit raising operation of GSAT-6 was successfully completed by firing the Apogee Motor for 2663 seconds at 11:10:53 hours IST on Aug 29, 2015. Realized orbit was 26,998 kilometres (16,776 mi) (perigee height) by 35,682 kilometres (22,172 mi) (apogee height) with an inclination of 0.115 degree and an orbital period of 20 hours and 15 minutes.

Third orbit raising operation of GSAT-6 was successfully completed by firing the Apogee Motor for 580.32 seconds at 07:46 hours IST on Aug 30, 2015. Deployment of the unfurlable antenna (UFA) also successfully completed with this. The satellite was at 78 degrees east longitude and was drifting towards its final slot at 83 degrees east.

GSAT-6 was successfully positioned in its orbital slot of 83 degree east and collocated with INSAT-4A, GSAT-12, GSAT-10 and IRNSS-1C on September 6, 2015, morning, after carrying out four drift arresting maneuvers.

== Under-utilization of GSAT-6 ==
According to Comptroller and Auditor General of India report submitted to parliament in 20 December 2022, the GSAT-6 satellite has remained largely underutilized since its launch in August 2015 which is almost half of the expected operational life of 12 years. The audit observed the lack of coordination between Department of Space and DRDO and the delay in establishing ground segment by DRDO as the reason behind this disuse. According to Department of Space the 20 per cent of the GSAT-6 capacity was used for its research projects and societal applications but was not aware of the status of utilization of the remaining capacity.

== See also ==
- Indian military satellites
- GSAT-6A
- Indian National Satellite System
- GSAT
- List of Indian satellites
- Satellite television
