= GSAT-14 =

Indian communications satellite

- Mission type: Communication
- Operator: ISRO
- COSPAR ID: 2014-001A
- SATCAT no.: 39498
- Mission duration: Planned: 12 years Elapsed: 12 years, 8 months, 19 days

Spacecraft properties
- Bus: I-2K
- Manufacturer: ISRO Satellite Centre; Space Applications Centre
- Launch mass: 1,982 kilograms (4,370 lb)
- Dry mass: 851 kilograms (1,876 lb)
- Power: 2,600 watts

Start of mission
- Launch date: 5 January 2014, 10:48 UTC
- Rocket: GSLV Mk.II D5
- Launch site: Satish Dhawan SLP
- Contractor: ISRO

Orbital parameters
- Reference system: Geocentric
- Regime: Geostationary
- Longitude: 74° East
- Perigee altitude: 35,776 kilometres (22,230 mi)
- Apogee altitude: 35,809 kilometres (22,251 mi)
- Inclination: 0.11 degrees
- Period: 1436.12 minutes
- Epoch: 22 January 2015, 20:39:21 UTC

Transponders
- Band: 6 Ku band 6 ext. C band 2 Ka band
- Coverage area: India

GSAT-14 is an Indian communications satellite launched in January 2014. It replaced the GSAT-3 satellite, which was launched in 2004. GSAT-14 was launched by a Geosynchronous Satellite Launch Vehicle Mk.II, which incorporated an Indian-built cryogenic engine on the third stage.

== Satellite ==
GSAT-14 is part of the GSAT series of satellites. Constructed by ISRO, it is based around the I-2K satellite bus, and has a dry mass of 851 kilograms (1,876 lb). With fuel, its mass is 1,982 kilograms (4,370 lb). The spacecraft has a design life of 12 years.

The satellite carries six Ku-band and six Extended C-band transponders to provide coverage of the whole of India. The satellite is expected to provide enhanced broadcasting services over the GSAT-3 satellite. GSAT-14 also carries two Ka-band beacons which will be used to conduct research into how weather affects Ka-band satellite communications. Fibre optic gyro, active pixel Sun sensor, round type bolometer and field programmable gate array based Earth sensors and thermal control coating experiments are new technologies which were flown as experiments in the satellite. The satellite is powered by two solar arrays, generating 2,600 watts of power.

== Launch ==
A launch attempt on 19 August 2013, with a planned liftoff at 11:20 UTC (4:50 pm local time), was scrubbed following a reported second stage fuel leak. While the probe for the failure to launch was in progress, ISRO had decided to replace the liquid second stage (GS-2) with a new one. In the process, all the four liquid strap-on stages were replaced with new ones.

The satellite was launched from the Second Launch Pad of the Satish Dhawan Space Centre, atop a Geosynchronous Satellite Launch Vehicle Mk.II (GSLV Mk.II) rocket at 10:48 UTC (16:18 local time) on 5 January 2014. The 29-hour countdown began on 4 January 2014.

The flight marked India's forty-first satellite launch, the eighth launch of a GSLV, and the second flight of the Mk.II variant, whose maiden flight with GSAT-4 had failed in 2010. It ended a run of four consecutive GSLV launch failures which began with INSAT-4C in 2006. The launch marked the first successful flight test of the CE-7.5, India's first cryogenically fuelled rocket engine.
