= South Asia Satellite =

Indian communications satellite

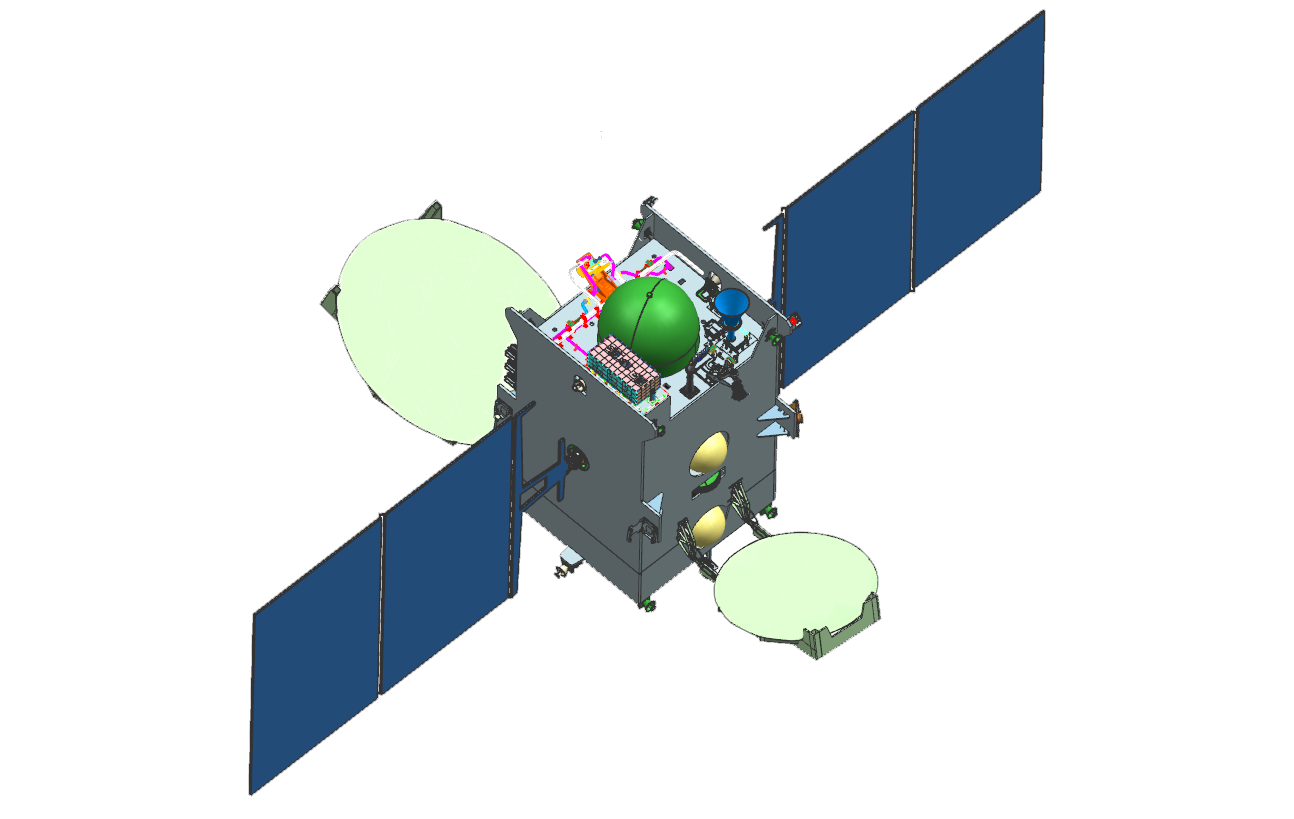
- Names: GSAT-9
- Mission type: Communications / Meteorology
- Operator: ISRO
- COSPAR ID: 2017-024A
- SATCAT no.: 42695
- Website: GSAT-9
- Mission duration: Planned: 12 years Elapsed: 9 years, 4 months, 21 days

Spacecraft properties
- Bus: I-2K
- Manufacturer: ISRO Satellite Centre; Space Applications Centre
- Launch mass: 2,230 kg (4,916 lb)
- Dry mass: 976 kg (2,152 lb)
- Dimensions: 1.53 × 1.65 × 2.40 m (5.0 × 5.4 × 7.9 ft)
- Power: 3,500 watts

Start of mission
- Launch date: 5 May 2017, 11:27 UTC
- Rocket: GSLV Mk II-F09
- Launch site: Satish Dhawan SLP
- Contractor: ISRO

Orbital parameters
- Reference system: Geocentric
- Regime: Geostationary
- Longitude: 48° E
- Perigee altitude: 35,769 km (22,226 mi)
- Apogee altitude: 35,802 km (22,246 mi)
- Inclination: 0.0413°
- Epoch: 5 June 2017, 17:02:43 UTC

Transponders
- Band: 12 × K_{u} band
- Coverage area: SAARC

The South Asia Satellite (designated GSAT-9), formerly known as SAARC Satellite, is a geostationary communications and meteorology satellite operated by the Indian Space Research Organisation for the South Asian Association for Regional Cooperation (SAARC) region. The satellite was launched on 5 May 2017. During the 18th SAARC summit held in Nepal in 2014, Indian Prime Minister Narendra Modi mooted the idea of a satellite serving the needs of SAARC member nations as a part of his neighbourhood first policy. Afghanistan, Bangladesh, Bhutan, Maldives, Nepal and Sri Lanka are the users of the multi-dimensional facilities provided by the satellite.

Pakistan "offered technical and monetary support" which India rejected saying that it wanted the project to be a "gift" and multi-national collaboration would be time-consuming. Pakistan later on declined to participate in the project citing India's refusal to collaboration and security reasons. Afghanistan too was initially non-committal to the satellite which led to renaming of satellite from "SAARC Satellite" to "South Asia Satellite" referring just to the subcontinent. As of 2019 with exception of Pakistan, the satellite is in service with all SAARC countries.

The South Asia Satellite provides information on tele-medicine, tele-education, banking and television broadcasting. It is also equipped with remote sensing technology to collect real-time weather data and observe the geology of the South Asian nations.

== Background ==
During the Indian general elections campaign in 2014, Prime Minister Modi hinted that his foreign policy will actively focus on improving ties with India's immediate neighbours which is being termed as Neighbourhood first policy in the Indian media. Modi invited all heads of state/heads of government of SAARC countries during his swearing-in ceremony as Prime Minister of India and held bilateral talks with all of them individually, which was dubbed a "mini SAARC summit" by the media. India is only South Asian nation with orbital launch capability and builds and operates one of largest fleet of artificial satellites in world. Modi said, "There is a lot of poverty in the SAARC nations and we need scientific solutions for this".

In his address to the Sri Lankan Parliament in March 2015, Narendra Modi said "Sri Lanka will take full benefit of India's satellite for the SAARC Region. This should be in Space by December 2016".

== Response from SAARC nations ==
The announcement of the satellite was generally met with favourable views by the SAARC nations that supported the program, specifically from Sri Lanka and Bangladesh.

South-Asia Satellite coverage

=== Pakistan ===
Pakistan maintains its own space program under its Space and Upper Atmosphere Research Commission (SUPARCO), which has launched satellites on Chinese satellite launch vehicles in the past.

Pakistan initially declared that it was "keen" to participate on the project, offering monetary and technical support. However, Pakistan said it did not because "India was not willing to develop the project on a collaborative basis." Pakistan also stated it was working on its own satellite under its existing space commitments, thus declined to join the project. The Indian government declined Pakistani offers of technical and monetary help because it wanted the project to be an Indian "gift" and did not want to make it into a "SAARC project", and that collaborations with Pakistan would have taken some time. Earlier on 27 June 2015, ISRO chairman A. S. Kiran Kumar had announced that India and Pakistan would collaborate on developing the SAARC satellite with SUPARCO performing technical engineering under ISRO's guidance.

During the 70th UN meeting in New York City held on 20 September 2015, officials from India and Pakistan debated over the ownership and control of the satellite. On 2 October 2015, India announced that it had decided to go ahead with building the satellite, without Pakistan's consent. On 23 March 2016, Vikas Swarup, official spokesperson of the Ministry of External Affairs of India said "Pakistan has decided to opt-out of the satellite project. So it cannot be called a SAARC satellite. It will be a South Asia satellite."

There were some reports that Pakistan had security concerns, especially regarding espionage. However, the Pakistani foreign ministry said these reports were "unfounded".

=== Bangladesh ===
On 23 March 2017, Bangladesh signed the South Asia Satellite agreement with India. The agreement formally known as "Agreement between the Government of Republic of India and the Government of the People's Republic of Bangladesh concerning to orbit frequency co-ordination of 'South Asia Satellite' proposed at 48.E" would cover 12 transponders of the satellite from which, 1 will be gifted to Bangladesh.

Bangladesh has launched its first satellite Bangabandhu-1 on 12 May 2018. Citing the capacity of Thales Alenia Space manufactured Bangabandhu-1 satellite, the Chairman of Bangladesh Communication Satellite Company Limited (BSCL) Dr. Shahjahan Mahmood said, "Our own satellite can be used for commercial purposes and we can also sell its capacity to other countries while South Asia Satellite will be used only for limited purposes and its capacity will never be sold."

=== Bhutan ===
In November 2018, Bhutan announced that it is on track to begin using South Asia Satellite by the end of November 2018. Planned utilisation of allotted Ku-band transponder includes connecting three off-grid blocks in remote areas of the country, national TV broadcast, emergency communications and backup for domestic/international voice connectivity.

== Development ==
In November 2015, ISRO chairman A. S. Kiran Kumar stated that the satellite could be launched within 18 months of receiving approval from the SAARC member nations. It was proposed to build a satellite for the SAARC region with 12 Ku-band transponders (36 MHz each) and launch it with the Indian GSLV Mk-II. The cost of the satellite was estimated to be about ₹235 crore (equivalent to ₹330 crore or US$34 million in 2023), and the total cost including operational costs and insurance comes to ₹450 crore (equivalent to ₹631 crore or US$66 million in 2023). The cost associated with the launch was met by the Government of India.

The satellite was designed to support telecommunication and broadcasting applications, including television, direct-to-home (DTH) services, VSAT communications, tele-education, tele-medicine and disaster management.

== Satellite and payloads ==
GSAT-9 carries 12 K_{u} band transponders; each participating South Asian Country has access to a dedicated transponder for their communications.

The standalone satellite has a liftoff mass of about 2,230 kilograms (4,920 lb). GSAT-9 is the first Indian satellite to use electric propulsion albeit partially. It carries only 25% of the normal chemical fuel package compared to other Indian satellites, a xenon based electric propulsion system is used for orbital functions of the spacecraft. GSAT-20 is expected to be the first fully electric propulsion system enabled satellite.

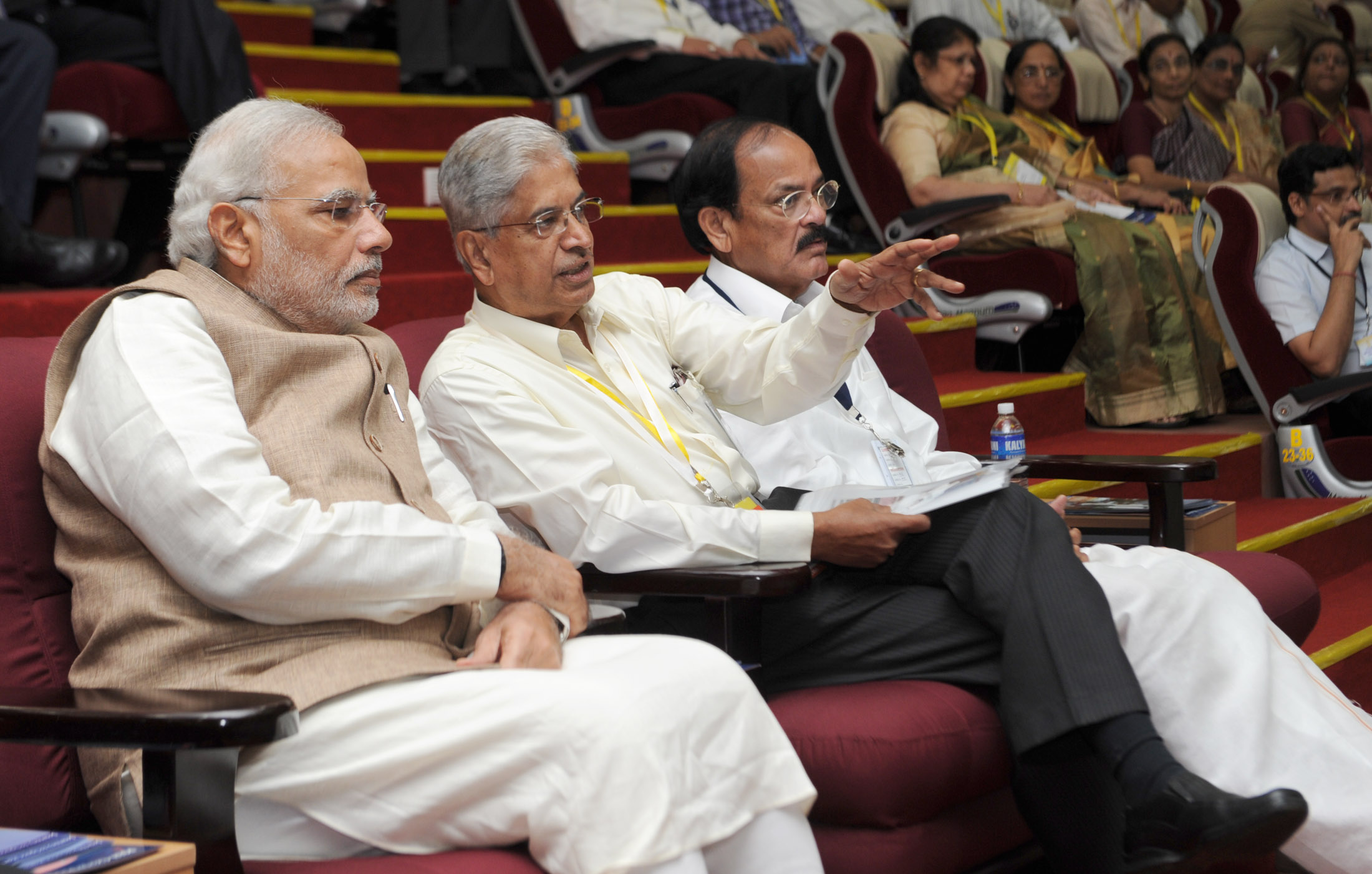
Dr. B.N. Suresh, briefing the Prime Minister, Shri Narendra Modi, on the successful launch of PSLV - C 23, at Sriharikota

== Launch ==
The satellite was launched on 5 May 2017 at 11:27 UTC aboard the GSLV-F09 rocket from the Second Launch Pad (SLP) of the Satish Dhawan spaceport in Sriharikota, in the southern part of Andhra Pradesh.

== Orbit raising and station keeping ==
The launch was followed by a series of orbit-raising operations (using an on-board LAM and chemical thrusters) to place the satellite in the intended geostationary orbital slot.

Op #	Date/ Time (UTC)	LAM burn time	Height achieved		Inclination achieved	Orbital period	References
Op #	Date/ Time (UTC)	LAM burn time	Apogee	Perigee	Inclination achieved	Orbital period	References
1	5 May 2017; 10:21	2643 s	35,873 km (22,290 mi)	5,687 km (3,534 mi)	10.38°	12 h, 22 min	
2	7 May 2017; 04:00	3529.7 s	35,858 km (22,281 mi)	28,608 km (17,776 mi)	0.755°	20 h, 58 min	
3	8 May 2017; 01:21:52	445.8 s	35,809 km (22,251 mi)	35,776.8 km (22,230.7 mi)	0.0°	23 h, 56 min, 6 s	

== Reactions ==
Sri Lankan President Maithripala Sirisena congratulated Modi using satellite technology and claimed that it would help uplift the standards of people. Nepalese officials commented on Nepalese current inability to fully utilize the satellite information.

== See also ==
- GSAT-20
- Indian Space Research Organisation
- Neighbourhood first policy
