= GSAT-11 =

Indian geostationary telecommunications satellite

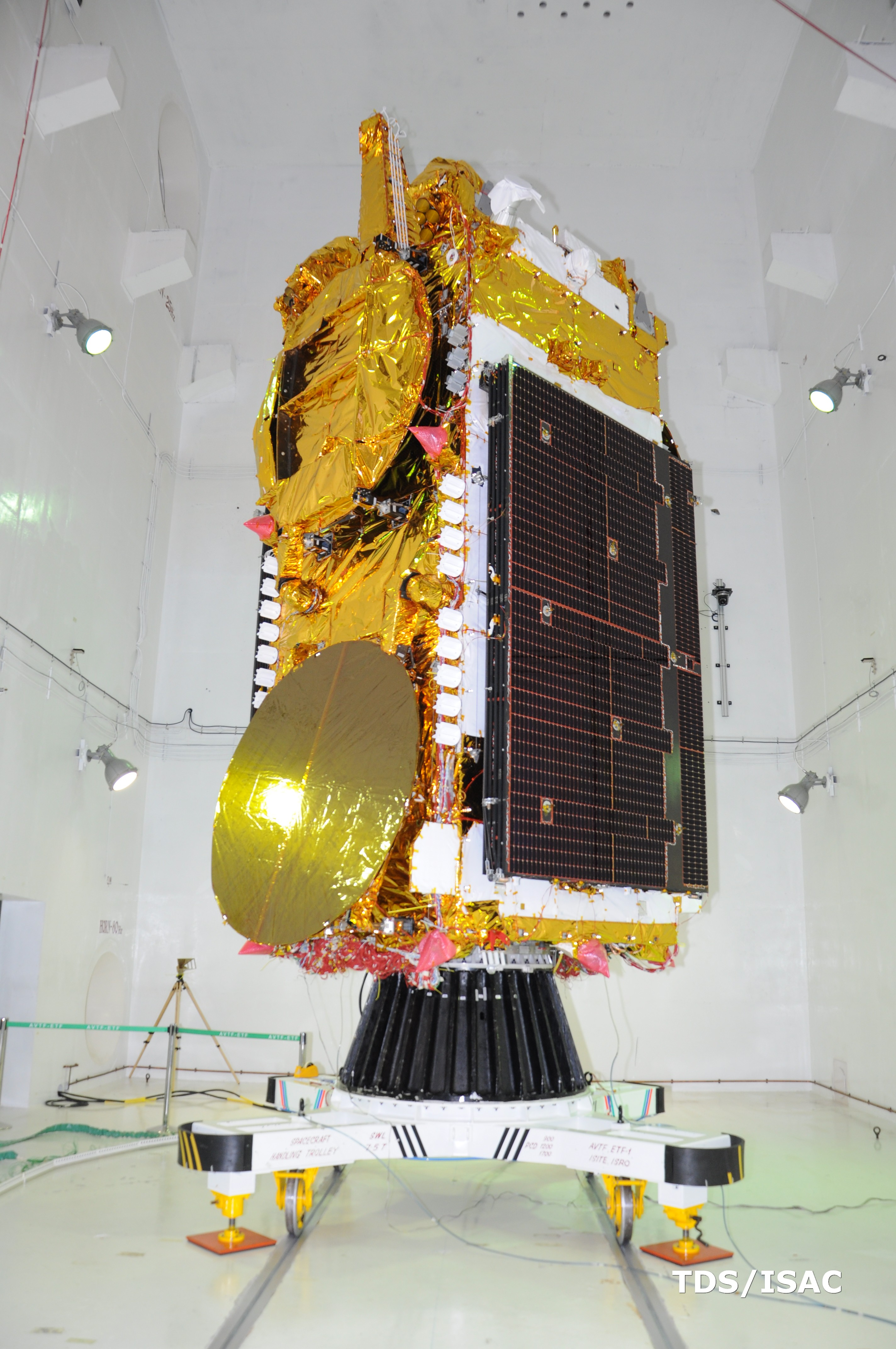
- Mission type: Communication
- Operator: ISRO
- COSPAR ID: 2018-100B
- SATCAT no.: 43824

Spacecraft properties
- Bus: I-6K Bus
- Manufacturer: ISRO Satellite Centre; Space Applications Centre
- Launch mass: 5,854 kilograms (12,906 lb)
- Power: 13.6 kilowatts

Start of mission
- Launch date: 4 December 2018, 20:37 UTC
- Rocket: Ariane 5 VA246
- Launch site: Guiana Space Centre
- Contractor: Arianespace, ESA

Orbital parameters
- Reference system: Geocentric
- Regime: Geostationary
- Longitude: 74° East

Transponders
- Band: Ku/Ka band
- Bandwidth: 16 Gbps

GSAT-11 is an Indian geostationary communications satellite. The 5854 kg satellite is based on the new I-6K Bus and carries 40 transponders in the Ku-band and Ka-band frequencies (32 Ka × Ku-Band Forward Link Transponders and 8 Ku × Ka band Return Link Transponders), which are capable of providing up to 16 Gbit/s throughput. GSAT-11 is India's heaviest satellite.

== Launch ==
Initially the satellite was planned to be launched in May 2018, but was delayed after ISRO recalled it back to India from the launch site in French Guiana for additional checks weeks after ISRO lost communication to another communication satellite, the GSAT-6A, soon after its launch in March 2018.

After the satellite was found fit for the launch, the new launch date had been set to 4 December 2018. GSAT 11 was launched successfully from the European Spaceport, French Guiana (Guiana Space Center) on 20:37 UTC, 4 December 2018 along with GEO-KOMPSAT-2A of KARI.

== Satellite ==
GSAT-11 was developed at the cost of Rs. 579 Crores and its launch was procured at cost of Rs. 810.94 Crores. The payload consists of 40 high power Ku, Ka band transponders built at Space Applications Centre in Ahmedabad.

== See also ==
- Ariane flight VA246
- GSAT
