= SOXS =

Solar X-Ray Spectrometer, or SOXS, was an experimental payload launched onboard Indian geostationary satellite GSAT-2 by the Indian Space Research Organisation, ISRO. SOXS collected data about X-ray emissions from solar flares with high energy and temporal resolutions.

== Features ==
- X-Ray spectrometer (SOXS) was flown onboard GSAT-2 on 8 May 2003.
- SOXS employs Si and CZT semiconductor devices, which are extremely high resolution and low noise detectors.
- Detector package is mounted on a sun pointing mechanism with tracking accuracy better than 0.1 degree.
- Pulse height (PHA) measurements in 256 channels
- System dead time - 16 microseconds for Si Pin and 13 microseconds for CZT
- Energy window counters
- On board calibration using Cd109 radio isotope
- System health parameters monitoring
- Onboard selection for background rejection (LLD/threshold)
- In view of temperature sensitivity of the detectors, observational interval is < 3 hrs starting from 04:00 to 06:45 UT.
- Block schematics of SLD Payload (SLED, SFE, SLE and SCE)
- SSTM daily tracking (0 to 189 degrees)
