= KVD-1 =

Soviet rocket stage

KVD-1 (12KRB)
- Country of origin: Soviet Union; Russia
- First flight: 2001-04-20, GSAT-1 Mission, GSLV debut flight
- Last flight: 2010-12-25, GSAT-5P launch, GSLV Mk I final flight
- Designer: KB KhIMMASH
- Application: Upper stage engine
- Associated LV: GSLV Mk 1
- Status: Retired

Liquid-fuel engine
- Propellant: Liquid oxygen / liquid hydrogen
- Mixture ratio: 6
- Cycle: Staged combustion

Configuration
- Chamber: 1 + 2 verniers

Performance
- Thrust, vacuum: 69.6 kN (15,600 lb_{f})
- Chamber pressure: 5.6 MPa (810 psi)
- Specific impulse, vacuum: 462 s
- Burn time: 800 s (600 s in a single burn)
- Gimbal range: None; uses 2 vernier engines for attitude control

Dimensions
- Length: 2.14 m (7 ft 0 in)
- Diameter: 1.58 m (5 ft 2 in)
- Dry mass: 282 kg (622 lb)

KVD-1 was an upper stage LOX/LH_{2} cryogenic engine developed by the Isayev Design Bureau (now KB KhIMMASH) of Russia in the early 1960s. It is a modified version of the RD-56, developed for a never-completed cryogenic upper stage of the N-1 super-heavy lift rocket, with the goal of enabling crewed lunar missions by the USSR. The KVD-1 produces a thrust of 7.5 tonnes.

== Initial development ==
KVD-1 was originated from the RD-56 engine which were intended to be used for the Soviet crewed lunar programs. RD-56 (11D56) engines were developed for N1M rocket programme, the planned derivative of N1, but later they were abandoned due to four successive launch failures of N1. Later the design of the engine was sold to ISRO under the name "KVD-1" under a deal worth $120 million with the Soviet agency Glavkosmos which enabled ISRO to import 2 KVD-1 engines and an agreement for transfer of technology from Russia.

== ISRO programme ==
The engines were proven to be inefficient because of their low thrust-to-weight ratio. Later the Russian space agency optimised the engine to launch payloads with a mass of 2.5 tonnes or less. The INSAT-4CR satellite with a mass of 2,140 kg was launched in 2007 but reached a lower than planned orbit due to the poor performance of the third stage's single KVD-1 engine. The satellite subsequently used its own propulsion to get to the planned orbit. Because of this the useful life of the satellite was shortened.

== Sanctions imposed by United States ==
In 1991, an agreement was signed between India and Russia for technology transfer to India so that KVD-1 engines can be built indigenously in India. But later in July 1993, US imposed sanctions on ISRO and Glavkosmos saying it voids the Missile Technology Control Regime. This forced ISRO to develop its own cryogenic programme.

== Features ==
The engine was single chamber fueled rocket which could be used as cryogenic engines for launching of spacecraft that could be put in elliptical and geostationary orbits.

- Unfueled mass: 282 kg (621 lb)
- Height: 2.14 m
- Diameter: 1.56 m
- Specific impulse: 462 seconds
- Thrust: 69.60 kN (15,647 lbf)
- Burn time: 800 seconds
- Nozzle ratio：200

== Use ==
KVD-1 was used in following launch vehicles

- GSLV Mk I
