= Integrated Space Cell =

Indian space research agency, 2010–2019

The Integrated Space Cell was the nodal agency within the Government of India with oversight of the security of its space based military and civilian hardware systems. It was to be jointly operated by all the three services of the Indian Armed Forces, the civilian Defence Research and Development Organisation and ISRO. This agency was superseded by Defence Space Agency in 2019. As of April 2025, India has plans to have a constellation of 52 dedicated military satellites.

== Description ==
The Integrated Space Cell had been set up to utilise more effectively the country's space-based assets for military purposes and to look into threats to these assets. It functioned under the Integrated Defense Services headquarters of the Indian Ministry of Defense. This command leveraged space technology including satellites. Unlike an aerospace command, where the air force controls most of its activities, the Integrated Space Cell envisaged cooperation and coordination between the three services as well as civilian agencies dealing with space. The armed forces are increasingly depending on satellites for communication, aircraft and missile guidance, reconnaissance and surveillance. Satellites are also essential for civilian purposes such as weather forecasting, disaster management and communications. This had made it important to work out measures to protect India's space-based assets.

== Formation ==
The formation of an Integrated Space Cell was announced on 10 June 2010 by the former Defence Minister A. K. Antony who said it was being established because of "the growing threat" to India's space assets. "Offensive counter-space systems like anti-satellite weaponry, new classes of heavy-lift and small boosters and an improved array of military space systems have emerged in our neighbourhood" stressing that these need to be countered. Announcing its setting up, Antony said while India remains committed to non-weaponisation of space, emergence of offensive counter space systems and anti-satellite weaponry posed new threats which had to be countered. The defense minister's announcement comes about 16 months after India's then chief of air staff, Air Chief Marshal Shashi Tyagi, told the media that India was "in the process of setting up an aerospace command to exploit outer space by integrating its capabilities". The Integrated Space Cell has apparently been operational for six months before its formal announcement by Defence Minister Shri. A. K. Antony.

The announcement came less than a month after China used a medium-range ballistic missile to shoot down one of its own aging satellites, a Chinese Fengyun 1C polar orbit weather satellite that it had launched into orbit in 1999. With that, China displayed to the world that it had the technology to knock out a satellite in space, expertise that only two other countries - Russia and the United States have. On 27 March 2019 India also demonstrated this technology by knocking one of its own satellites, making it the fourth nation after U.S, Russia and China to do so. But there are broader reasons behind its formation, especially with the Indian Armed Forces relying more on space-based assets for communication, reconnaissance and surveillance.

== Military satellites ==
As of December 2018, the IRS system is the largest constellation of remote sensing satellites for civilian use in operation today in the world which also has the dual military use, with 14 operational satellites including the latest at least 4 dedicated military use (GSAT-7, GSAT-6 and GSAT-7A, EMISAT by DRDO), however GSAT-6A which was launched as a dedicated satellite for army lost communication after its launch, and HySIS and Microsat-R satellites as of 24 January 2019 are dual use satellite available to military also. Of the 900+ operational satellites, there are 320 dual use or dedicated military satellite in the sky, half of which are owned by United States alone, followed by Russia, China and India (14), as of 24 January 2018. All these Indian satellites are placed in polar Sun-synchronous orbit and provide data in a variety of spatial, spectral and temporal resolutions. Though most are not meant to be dedicated military satellites, some have a spatial resolution of 1 metre or below which can be also used for military applications. The following is a noteworthy list of satellites:

=== Anti-satellite weapons ===
1. Microsat-R satellite was launched and it served as a target for Indian anti-satellite weapon experiment in which it was successfully destroyed by India's anti-satellite missile.

=== Requirement for additional military satellites ===
As aftermath of 2020 China–India skirmishes, the Indian security agencies have requested the government for additional four to six satellites with high resolution sensors and cameras to keep an eye on individuals and small objections on and across Line of Actual Control.

== Anti Satellite Weapon Test ==
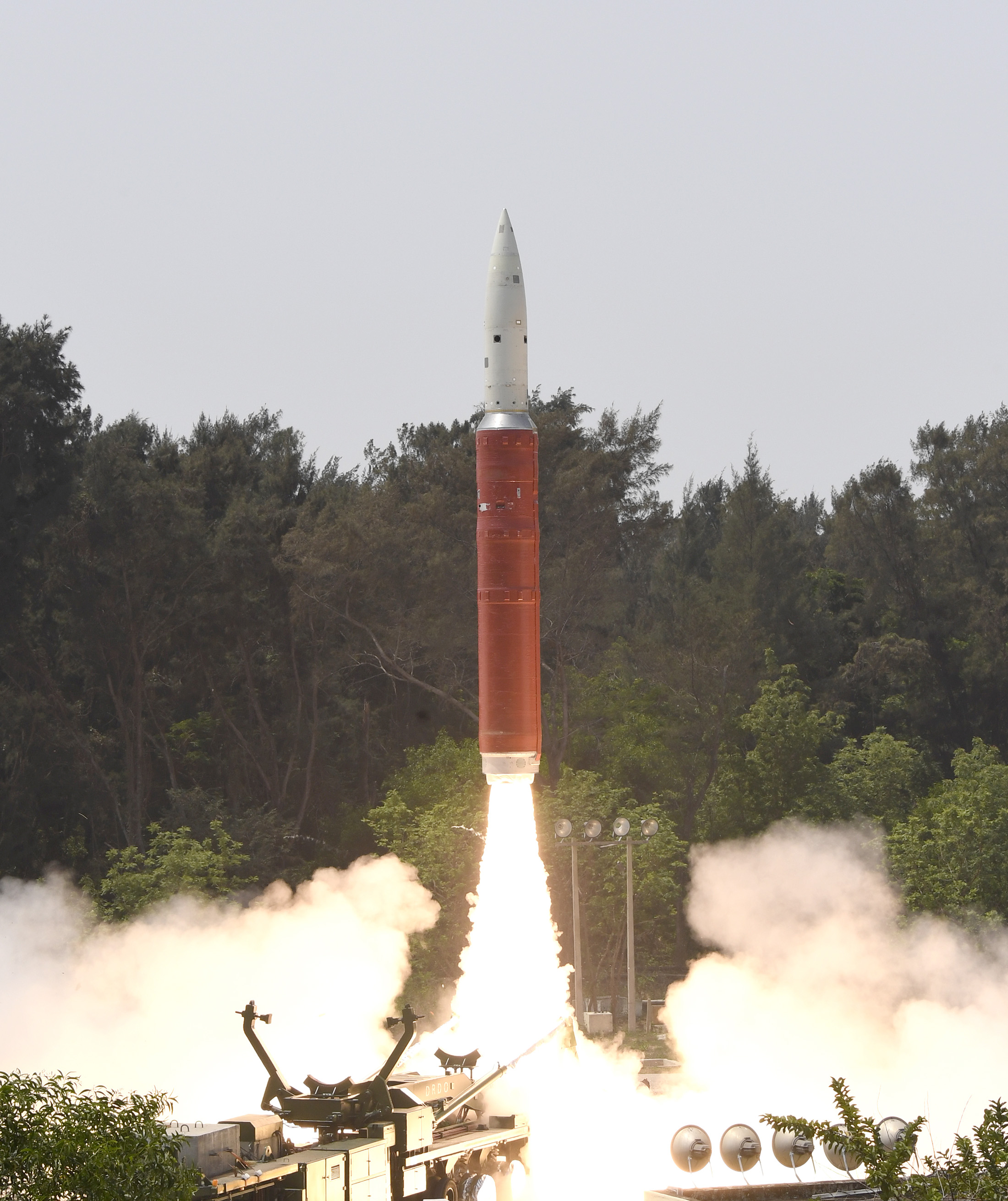
Launch of an interceptor derived from Indian Ballistic Missile Defence Programme for ASAT test on 27 March 2019

On 27 March 2019, Indian Prime Minister Narendra Modi announced the successful launch of India's first ASAT. The interceptor was able to strike a test satellite at a 300-kilometre (186 mi) altitude in low Earth orbit (LEO), thus successfully testing its ASAT missile. The interceptor was launched at around 05:40 UTC at the Integrated Test Range (ITR) in Chandipur, Odisha and hit its target Microsat-R after 168 seconds. The operation was named Mission Shakti. The missile system was developed by the Defence Research and Development Organisation (DRDO)—a research wing of the Indian defence services. With this test, India became the fourth nation with anti-satellite missile capabilities. India stated that this capability is a deterrent and is not directed against any nation.

== See also ==
- Armed Forces Special Operations Division
- Defence Cyber Agency
- Space Based Surveillance project (India)
- Integrated Defence Staff
- Indian Nuclear Command Authority
- Strategic Forces Command
- Special Forces of India
- List of Indian Air Force stations
- List of Indian Navy bases
- India's overseas military bases
- Joint warfare
