= Glavkosmos =

Russian launch service provider

- Glavkosmos logo
- Native name: АО «Главкосмос»
- Type: Open joint-stock company
- Founded: May 23, 1985; 41 years ago
- Headquarters: Moscow, Russia
- Parent: Roscosmos
- Website: www.glavkosmos.com

Glavkosmos (Russian: Главкосмос) is a Russian launch service provider and subsidiary of the State Corporation for Space Activities "Roscosmos". In the Soviet Union, Glavkosmos was the prime authority for implementing cooperative agreements with foreign bodies, with activities including commercial utilisation of Soviet systems and flying foreign cosmonauts aboard Soviet spacecraft. Since the breakup of the Soviet Union and creation of Roscosmos, it has been concerned with converting military technology for use in civil applications as well as commercialisation of Russian space technology.

Roscosmos, Glavkosmos at 9th Bengaluru Space Expo 2026, BIEC

== History ==
On 26 February 1985, the Ministry of General Machine-Building of the Soviet Union issued an order that formed the Main Department for the creation and use of space technology for the national economy and scientific research – Glavkosmos. Although it was originally envisioned to command all Soviet space activities, it worked more as a marketing and coordinating body than an executive agency.

During the perestroika reform movement of the late 1980s, Glavkosmos started offering commercial services for global customers, aimed primarily at competing with launchers based in the United States. The first commercial offering was presented at the Space Commerce '88 trade show in Montreux, Switzerland. Most notably it featured the sales of the following launchers: Energia, with a payload of up to 100t to Low Earth orbit (LEO); Proton with a payload of up to 20t to LEO or 2t to GEO for 25 - $30 million (1988) (equivalent to $81.67 million in 2025); Tsyklon-3 for payloads up to 4t to LEO; a family of Soyuz rockets in the configurations for LEO, geostationary transfer and Molniya orbits as well as the Vostok launchers for 12 - $18 million (1988) (equivalent to $49 million in 2025). Glavkosmos also featured Kosmos rockets with the successfully completed launches of Indian Aryabhata and Bhaskara satellites. Other offerings included the sales of the Okean-O1 satellites or the use of space on the Foton satellites and Mir space station. During the conference several contracts were signed, including down payments for three satellite launches for undisclosed customers, an option for a launch of the Aussat-2 on Proton, contract with Payload Systems Inc. for the experiments in protein crystallization on Mir and Kayser-Threde for microgravity experiments on the Foton satellites in 1989, 1990 and 1991.

The United States imposed sanctions on Glavkosmos in May 1992, after it agreed in January 1991 to transfer technology for the production of KVD-1 cryogenic rocket engines to the Indian Space Research Organisation.

Today, the key objectives of the company are the promotion of the Russian space industry to the world markets and management of complex international space projects. One of the key international projects of Glavkosmos is a joint Russian-European program, Soyuz at the Guiana Space Centre, in which Glavkosmos is the main contract integrator for all of the Russian rocket and space industry entities involved. Glavkosmos is also in charge of coordination with the French company Arianespace at all phases: Arianespace is responsible for launch operations and operates the Ariane 5, Vega and Soyuz launch sites at the Guiana Space Centre.

== GK Launch Services ==
GK Launch Services is a joint venture established by Glavkosmos and ISC Kosmotras in May 2017. Glavkosmos controls 75% of the company's stock, while Kosmostras controls 25%. GK Launch Services provides commercial rideshare launch services using the Soyuz-2 launch vehicle, with their first fully-commercial mission conducted on 22 March 2021.

== Directors ==
- Denis Vladimirovich Lyskov (2016-2018)
- Dmitry Vladimirovich Loskutov (2018-2023)
- Ilya Sergeyevich Tarasenko (since 2023)
