= Geosynchronous Satellite Launch Vehicle =

Class of Indian medium-lift expendable launch vehicles, developed by ISRO

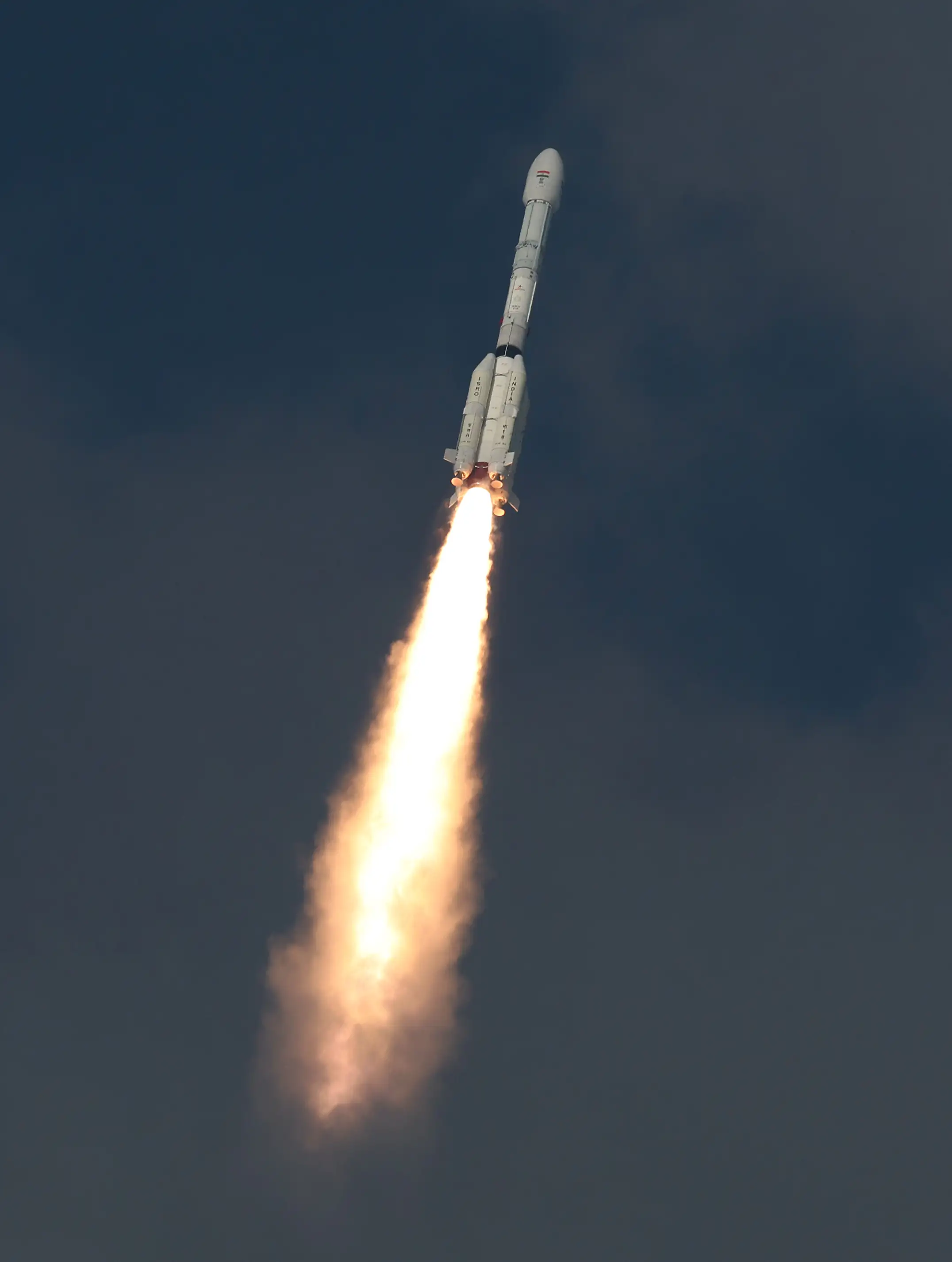
- GSLV-F16 during Liftoff carrying NISAR for NASA and ISRO
- Function: Medium-lift Launch System
- Manufacturer: ISRO
- Country of origin: India
- Cost per launch: US$47 million

Size
- Height: 49.13 m (161.2 ft)
- Diameter: 2.8 m (9 ft 2 in)
- Mass: 414,750 kg (914,370 lb)
- Stages: 3

Capacity

Payload to LEO
- Mass: 6,000 kg (13,000 lb)

Payload to SSO
- Mass: 3,000 kg (6,600 lb)

Payload to GTO
- Mass: 2,500 kg (5,500 lb)

Payload to Venus
- Mass: 247 kg (545 lb) to 1,346 kg (2,967 lb) (direct transfer)

Payload to Mars
- Mass: 350 kg (770 lb) to 1,390 kg (3,060 lb) (direct transfer)

Launch history
- Status: Mk I: Retired; Mk II: Active
- Launch sites: Satish Dhawan Space Centre
- Total launches: 20
- Success(es): 14
- Failure: 4
- Partial failure: 2
- First flight: Mk.I: 18 April 2001; Mk.II: 15 April 2010
- Last flight: Mk.I: 25 December 2010; Mk.II: 30 October 2026
- Carries passengers or cargo: INSAT; GSAT (South Asia Satellite); GISAT; NVS; NISAR

Boosters
- No. boosters: 4 L40 Hs
- Height: 19.7 m (65 ft)
- Diameter: 2.1 m (6 ft 11 in)
- Propellant mass: 42,700 kg (94,100 lb) each
- Powered by: 1 Vikas-1+
- Maximum thrust: 760 kN (170,000 lb_{f})
- Total thrust: 3,040 kN (680,000 lb_{f})
- Specific impulse: 262 s (2.57 km/s)
- Burn time: 154 seconds
- Propellant: N_{2}O_{4} / UDMH

First stage
- Height: 20.2 m (66 ft)
- Diameter: 2.8 m (9 ft 2 in)
- Propellant mass: 138,200 kg (304,700 lb)
- Powered by: 1 S139
- Maximum thrust: 4,846.9 kN (1,089,600 lb_{f})
- Specific impulse: 237 s (2.32 km/s)
- Burn time: 100 seconds
- Propellant: HTPB

Second stage
- Height: 11.6 m (38 ft)
- Diameter: 2.8 m (9 ft 2 in)
- Propellant mass: 39,500 kg (87,100 lb)
- Powered by: 1 Vikas-2B
- Maximum thrust: 846.8 kN (190,400 lb_{f})
- Specific impulse: 295 s (2.89 km/s)
- Burn time: 139 seconds
- Propellant: N_{2}O_{4} / UDMH

Second GS2 (GL40) stage
- Height: 11.9 m (39 ft)
- Diameter: 2.8 m (9 ft 2 in)
- Propellant mass: 42,500 kg (93,700 lb)
- Powered by: 1 Vikas-2B
- Maximum thrust: 846.8 kN (190,400 lb_{f})
- Specific impulse: 295 s (2.89 km/s)
- Burn time: 149 seconds
- Propellant: N_{2}O_{4} / UDMH

Third stage (GSLV Mk I) – CUS
- Height: N/A
- Diameter: 2.8 m (9 ft 2 in)
- Propellant mass: N/A
- Powered by: 1 KVD-1
- Maximum thrust: 70 kN (16,000 lb_{f})
- Specific impulse: 462 s (4.53 km/s)
- Burn time: N/A
- Propellant: LOX / LH_{2}

Third stage (GSLV Mk II) – CUS12
- Height: 8.7 m (29 ft)
- Diameter: 2.8 m (9 ft 2 in)
- Propellant mass: 12,800 kg (28,200 lb)
- Powered by: 1 CE-7.5
- Maximum thrust: 75 kN (17,000 lb_{f})
- Specific impulse: 454 s (4.45 km/s)
- Burn time: 718 seconds
- Propellant: LOX / LH_{2}

Third stage (GSLV Mk II) – CUS15
- Height: 9.9 m (32 ft)
- Diameter: 2.8 m (9 ft 2 in)
- Propellant mass: 15,000 kg (33,000 lb)
- Powered by: 1 CE-7.5
- Maximum thrust: 75 kN (17,000 lb_{f})
- Specific impulse: 454 s (4.45 km/s)
- Burn time: 846 seconds
- Propellant: LOX / LH_{2}

Geosynchronous Satellite Launch Vehicle (GSLV) is a class of expendable launch systems operated by ISRO. GSLV has been used in eighteen launches since 2001.

== History ==
The Geosynchronous Satellite Launch Vehicle (GSLV) project was initiated in 1990 with the objective of acquiring an Indian launch capability for geosynchronous satellites.

GSLV uses major components that are already proven in the Polar Satellite Launch Vehicle (PSLV) launch vehicles in the form of the S125/S139 solid rocket booster and the liquid-fueled Vikas engine. Due to the thrust required for injecting the satellite in a geostationary transfer orbit (GTO) the third stage was to be powered by a LOX/LH_{2} Cryogenic engine which at that time India did not possess or have the technological expertise to build. The aerodynamic characterization research was conducted at the National Aerospace Laboratories' 1.2m Trisonic Wind Tunnel Facility.

The first development flight of the GSLV (Mk I configuration) that launched on 18 April 2001 was a failure as the payload failed to reach the intended orbit parameters. The launcher was declared operational after the second development flight successfully launched the GSAT-2 satellite. During the initial years from the first launch in 2001 to 2014 the launcher had a checkered history with only 2 successful launches out of 7, resulting in the rocket gaining the nickname "naughty boy". Currently managed as the GSLV Continuation Programme, contracts for the rocket launches from the Indian government are awarded in phases, with the latest beign phase 4, covering launches of 2-tonne strateegic missions from 2020 onwards.

=== Cryogenic engine controversy ===
The third stage was to be procured from Russian company Glavkosmos, including transfer of technology and design details of the engine based on an agreement signed in 1991. Russia backed out of the deal after United States objected to the deal as in violation of the Missile Technology Control Regime (MTCR) in May 1992. As a result, ISRO initiated the Cryogenic Upper Stage Project in April 1994 and began developing its own cryogenic engine. A new agreement was signed with Russia for 7 KVD-1 cryogenic stages and 1 ground mock-up stage with no technology transfer, instead of 5 cryogenic stages along with the technology and design as per the earlier agreement. These engines were used for the initial flights and were named GSLV Mk I.

=== Retirement ===
As of October 2024, ISRO has stopped selling GSLV Mk II Rockets. Eight known launches are planned with NVS Missions, IDRSS Missions, NISAR Mission. Unlike the other Rocket families developed by ISRO, the agency has not invited private agencies to develop the GSLV-Mk2 rocket. ISRO cites its cost per launch as higher, as fewer GSLV rockets have been developed and launched. At the end of 2025, flight components from GSLV-F12, GSLV-F14, GSLV-F15, and GSLV-F16 are reported to still be in earth orbit as Space Junk.

== Vehicle description ==
The 49 m (161 ft) tall GSLV, with a lift-off mass of 415 t (408 long tons; 457 short tons), is a three-stage vehicle with solid, liquid and cryogenic stages respectively. The payload fairing, which is 7.8 m (26 ft) long and 3.4 m (11 ft) in diameter, protects the vehicle electronics and the spacecraft during its ascent through the atmosphere. It is discarded when the vehicle reaches an altitude of about 115 km (71 mi).

GSLV employs S-band telemetry and C-band transponders for enabling vehicle performance monitoring, tracking, range safety / flight safety and preliminary orbit determination. The Redundant Strap Down Inertial Navigation System/Inertial Guidance System of GSLV housed in its equipment bay guides the vehicle from lift-off to spacecraft injection. The digital auto-pilot and closed loop guidance scheme ensure the required altitude maneuver and guide injection of the spacecraft to the specified orbit.

The GSLV can place approximately 5,000 kg (11,000 lb) into an easterly low Earth orbit (LEO) or 2,500 kg (5,500 lb) (for the Mk II version) into an 18° geostationary transfer orbit.

=== Liquid boosters ===
The first GSLV flight, GSLV-D1 used the L40 stage. Subsequent flights of the GSLV used high pressure engines in the strap-on boosters called the L40H. The GSLV uses four L40H liquid strap-on boosters derived from the L37.5 second stage, which are loaded with 42.6 tons of hypergolic propellants (UDMH and N_{2}O_{4}). The propellants are stored in tandem in two independent tanks 2.1 m (6 ft 11 in) diameter. The engine is pump-fed and generates 760 kN (170,000 lb_{f}) of thrust, with a burn time of 150 seconds.

=== First stage ===
GSLV-D1 used the S125 stage which contained 125 t (123 long tons; 138 short tons) of solid propellant and had a burn time of 100 seconds. All subsequent launches have used enhanced propellant loaded S139 stage. The S139 stage is 2.8 m in diameter and has a nominal burn time of 100 seconds.

=== Second stage ===
The GS2 stage is powered by the Vikas engine. It has a diameter of 2.8 m (9 ft 2 in).

=== Third stage ===
The third stage of the GSLV Mark II is propelled by the Indian CE-7.5 cryogenic rocket engine while the older defunct Mark I is propelled using a Russian made KVD-1. It uses liquid hydrogen (LH_{2}) and liquid oxygen (LOX) The Indian cryogenic engine was built at the Liquid Propulsion Systems Centre. The engine has a default thrust of 75 kN (17,000 lb_{f}) but is capable of a maximum thrust of 93.1 kN (20,900 lb_{f}). In GSLV-F14 mission, a new white coloured C15 stage was introduced which has more environmental-friendly manufacturing processes, better insulation properties and the use of lightweight materials.

Pre-flight Integration of GSLV rockets

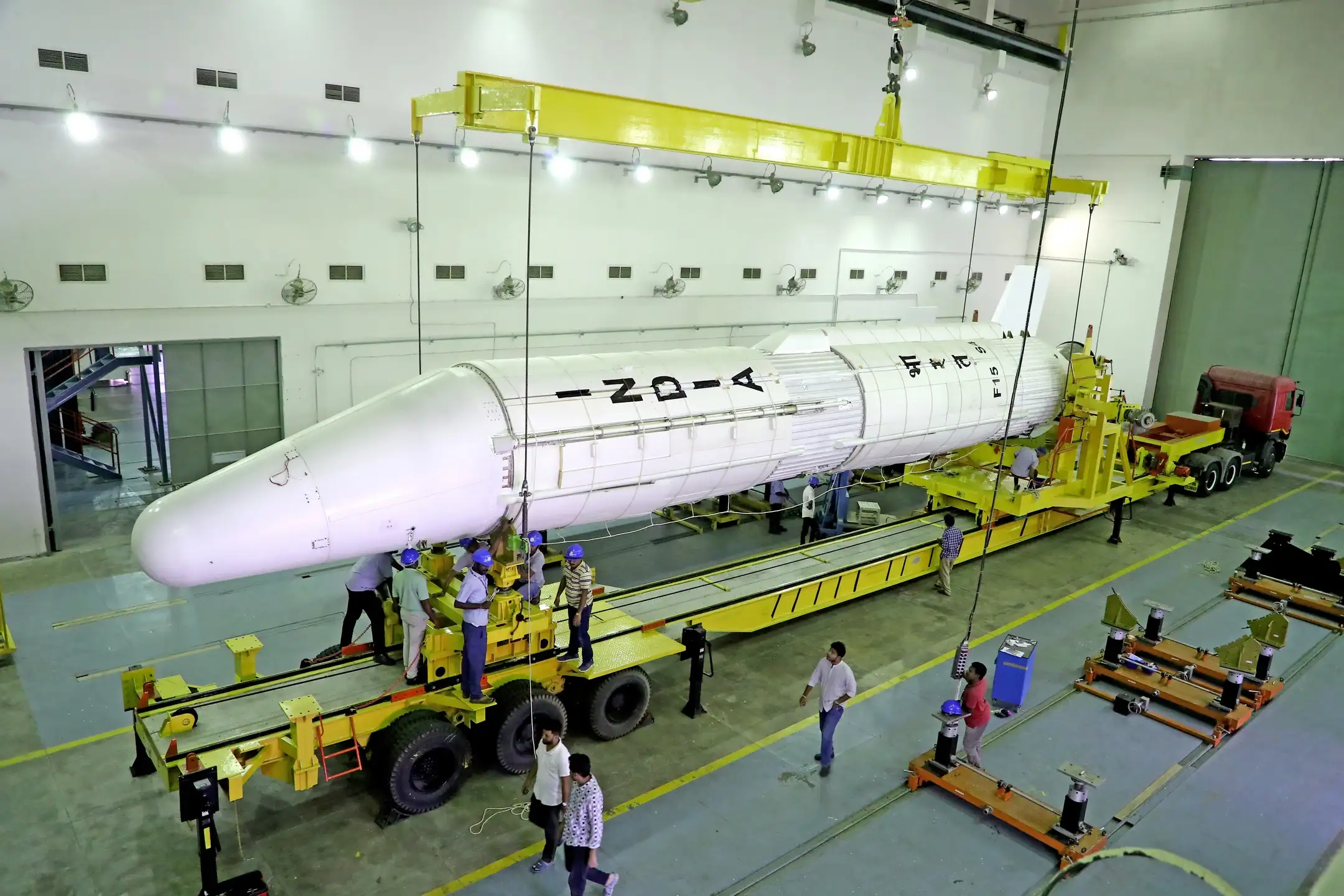
L40 booster under construction

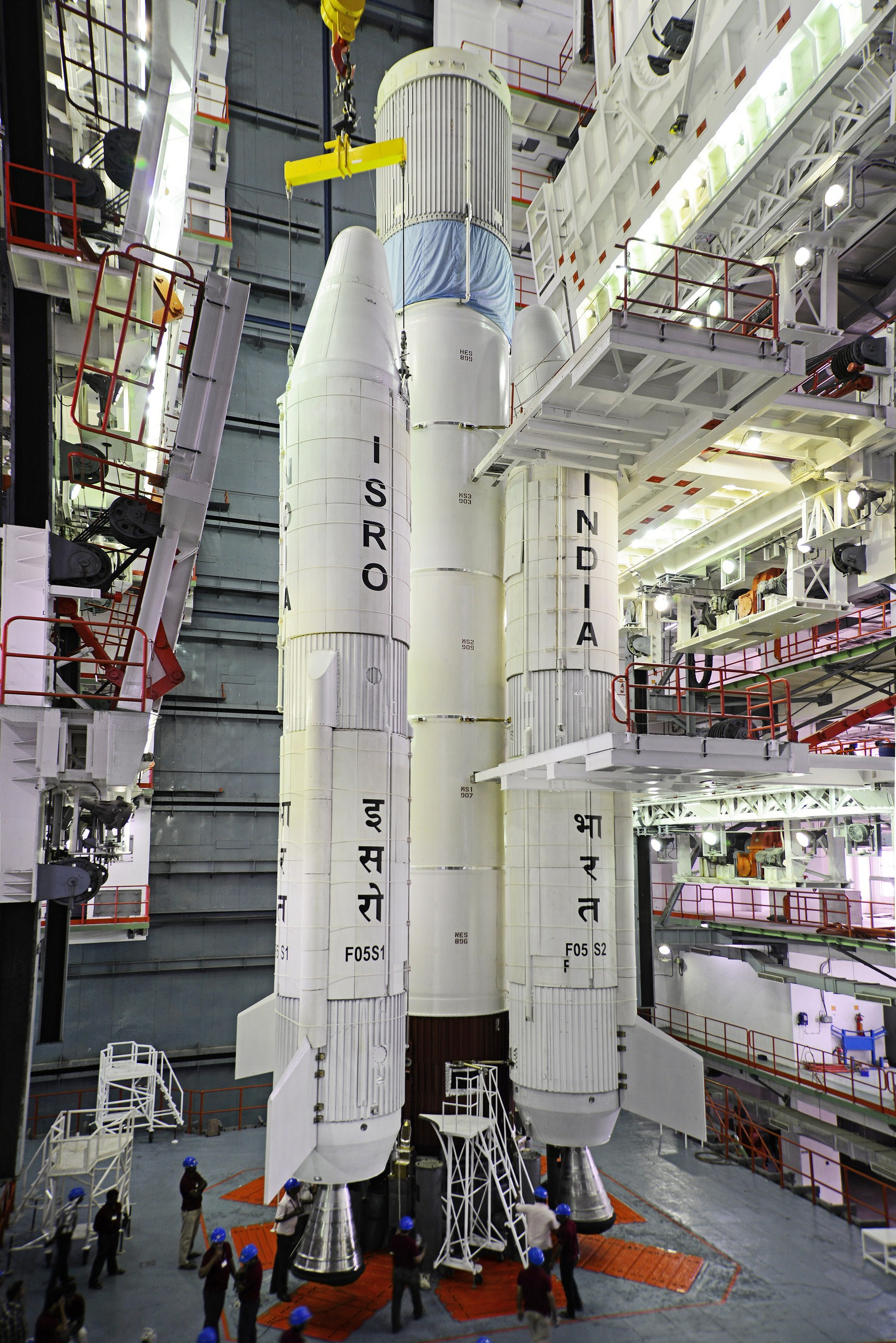
L40 boosters and S139 core stage of GSLV F-05 during integration

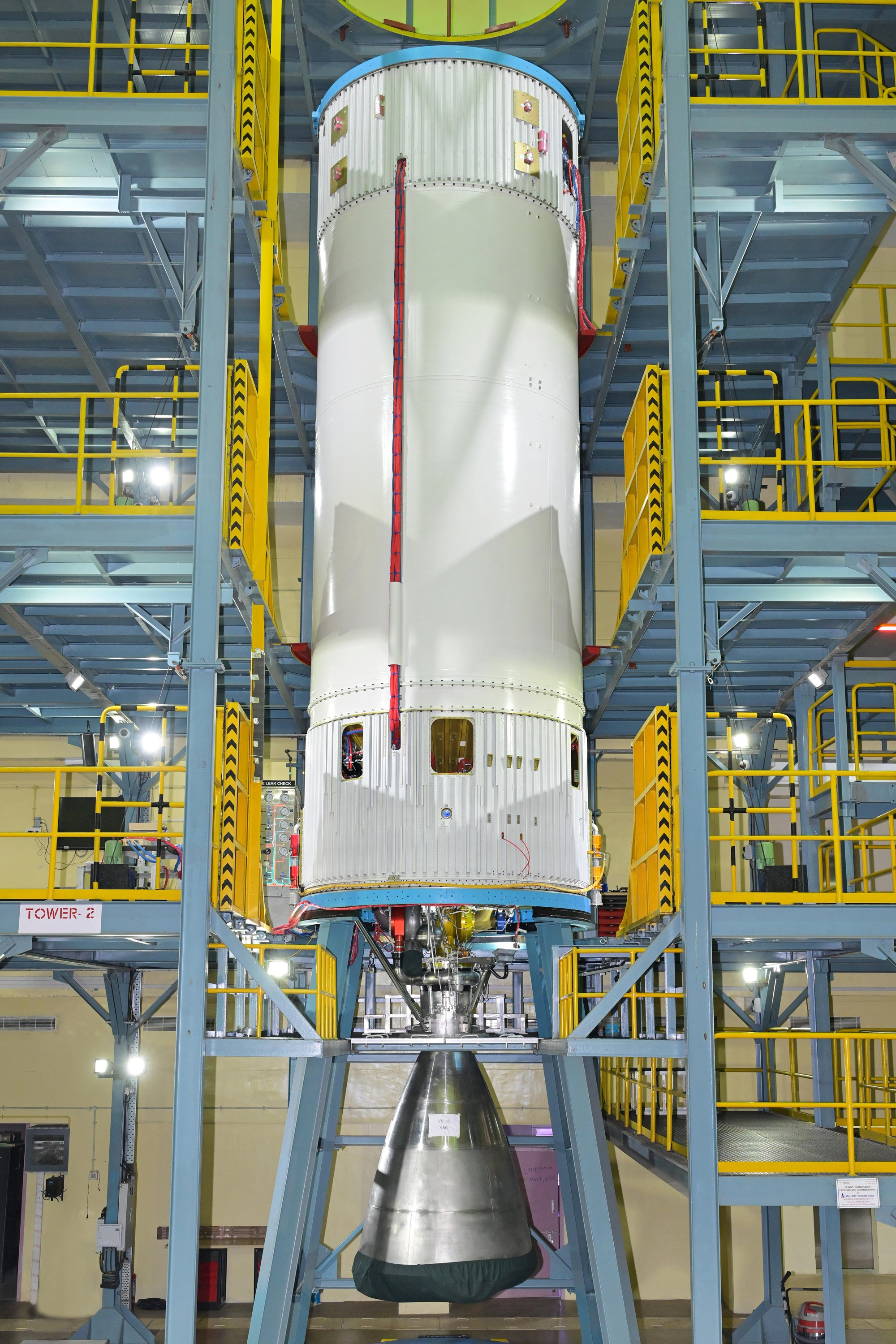
GS2 stage of GSLV-F16 being integrated

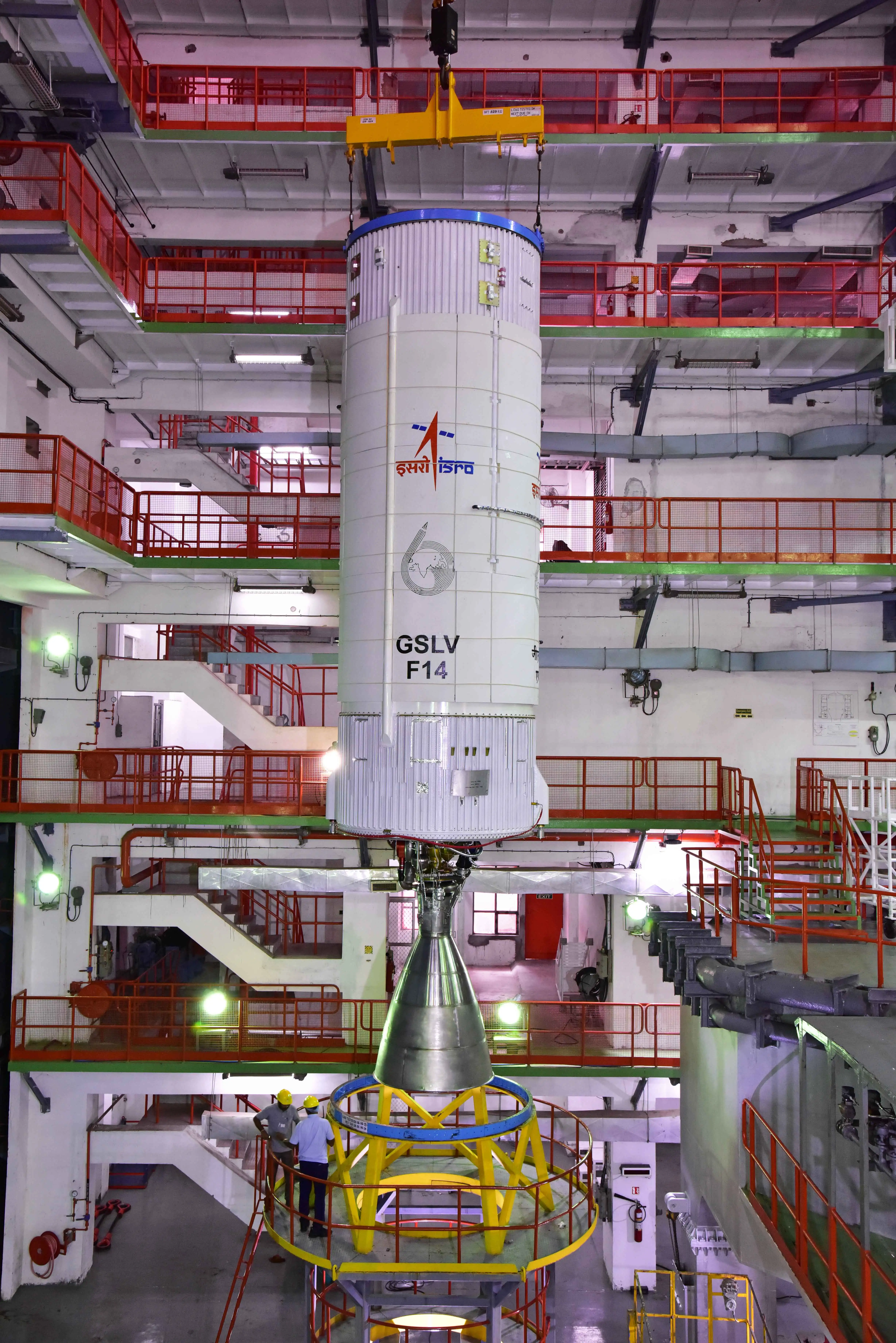
GS-2 integration

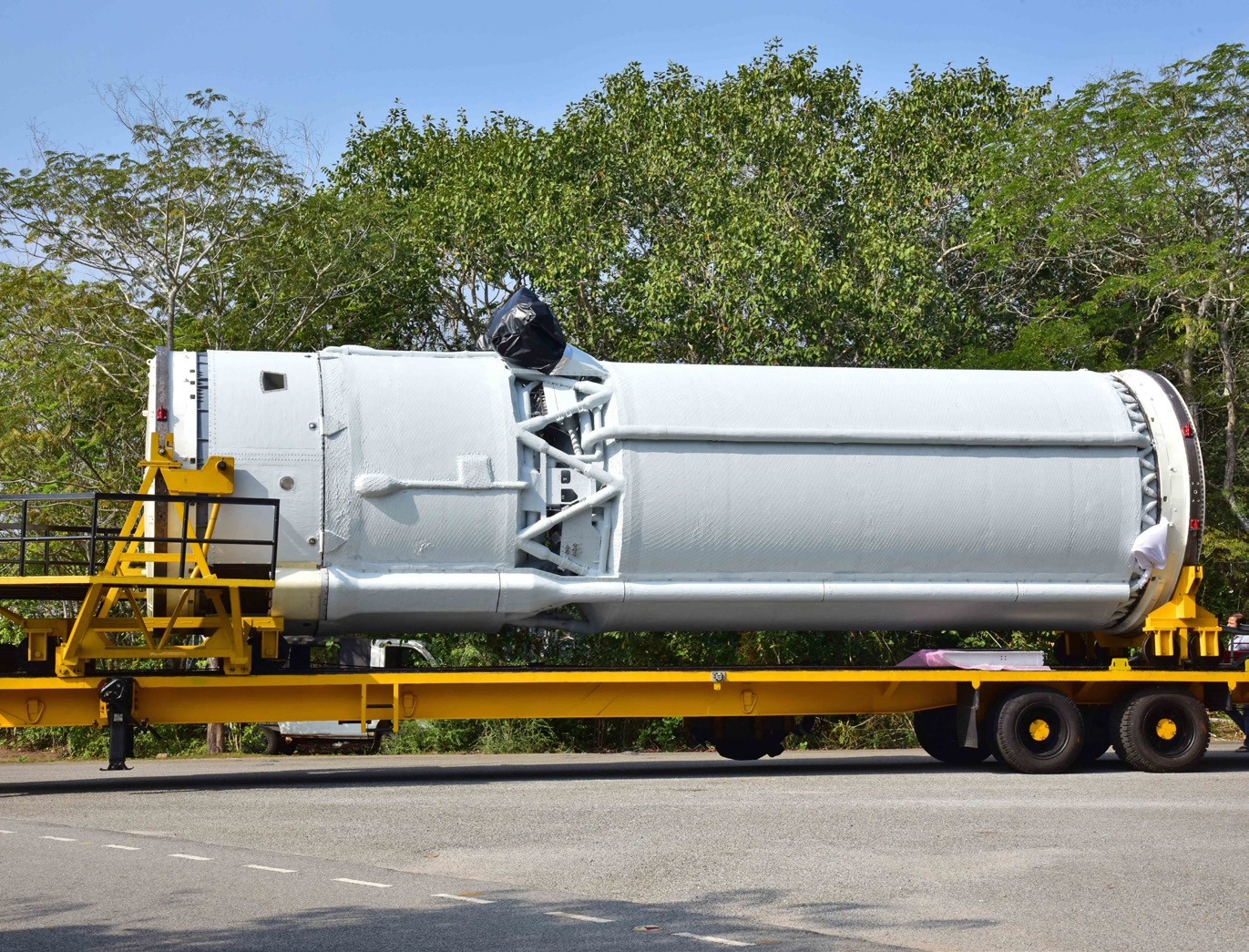
GSLV F-14 Cryogenic stage being transported prior to vehicle integration

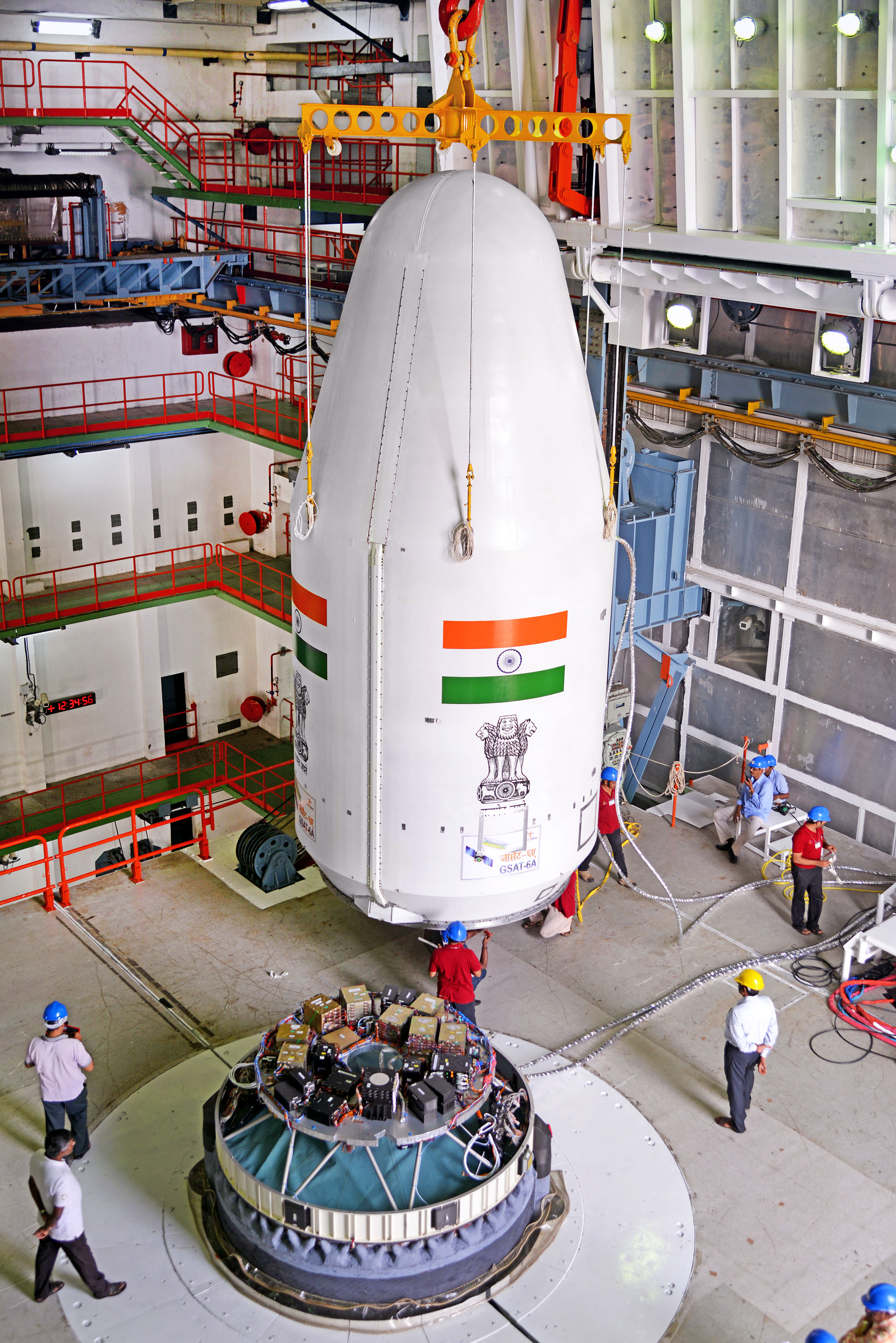
Payload fairing mating to the rocket

== Variants ==
GSLV rockets using the Russian Cryogenic Stage (CS) are designated as the GSLV Mark I while versions using the indigenous Cryogenic Upper Stage (CUS) are designated the GSLV Mark II. All GSLV launches have been conducted from the Satish Dhawan Space Centre in Sriharikota.

=== GSLV Mark I ===
The first developmental flight of GSLV Mark I had a 129 tonne (S125) first stage and was capable of launching around 1500 kg into geostationary transfer orbit. The second developmental flight replaced the S125 stage with S139. It used the same solid motor with 138 tonne propellant loading. The chamber pressure in all liquid engines were enhanced, enabling a higher propellant mass and burn time. These improvements allowed GSLV to carry an additional 300 kg of payload. The fourth operational flight of GSLV Mark I, GSLV-F06, had a longer third stage called the C15 with 15 tonne propellant loading and also employed a 4 meter diameter payload fairing. GSLV Mark I flights used Russian cryogenic engines.

=== GSLV Mark II ===
This variant uses an Indian cryogenic engine, the CE-7.5, and is capable of launching 2500 kg into geostationary transfer orbit.

For launches from 2018, a 6% increased thrust version of the Vikas engine was developed. It was demonstrated on 29 March 2018 in the GSAT-6A launch second stage. It will be used for the four Vikas engines on the first stage boosters on future missions.

A 4m diameter Ogive payload fairing was developed and deployed for the first time in the EOS-03 launch on 12 August 2021, although this launch was a failure due to technical anomalies with the Cryogenic Upper Stage. This will allow GSLV vehicles to accommodate larger payloads.

=== RLV-OREX ===
The Reusable Launch Vehicle Technology Demonstration program, is a prototype spaceplane concept created by ISRO. For the Orbital return Flight experiment, a modified version of the GSLV Mk. II launcher, with the upper Cryogenic Stage replaced with the PS-4 stage from the PSLV is currently in development, as the RLV won't need all the excess energy produced by the CUS .

== Launch statistics ==
Launch system status

Active
Retired

Variant	Launches	Successes	Failures	Partial failures
GSLV Mk. I	6	2	2	2
GSLV Mk. II	14	12	2	0
Total as of November 2026	20	14	4	2

Decade-wise summary of GSLV Launches

Decade	Successful	Partial failure	Failure	Total
2000s	2	2	1	5
2010s	6	0	2	8
2020s	6	0	1	7
Total	14	2	4	20

== Gallery ==
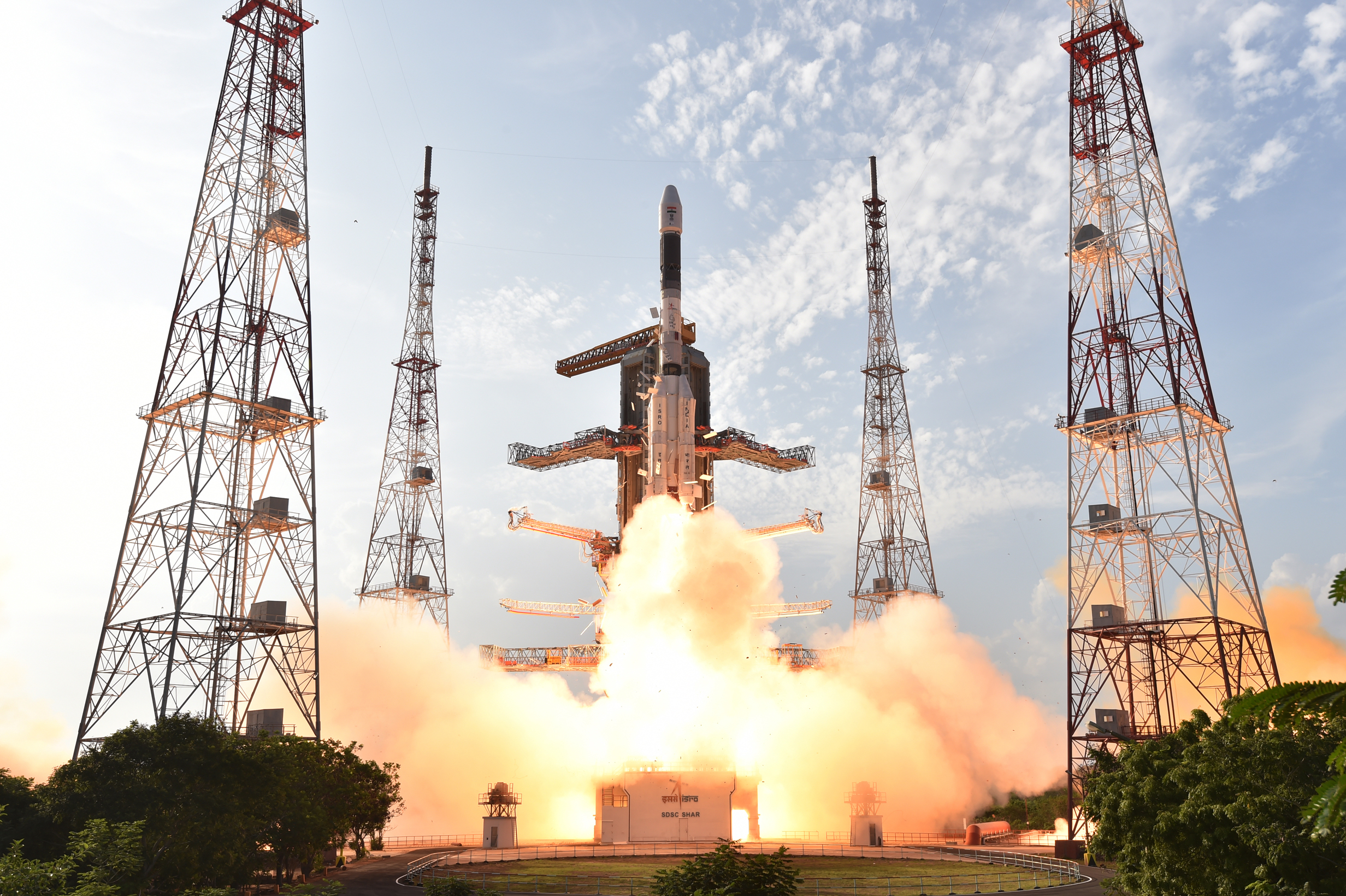
GSLV F05 take off

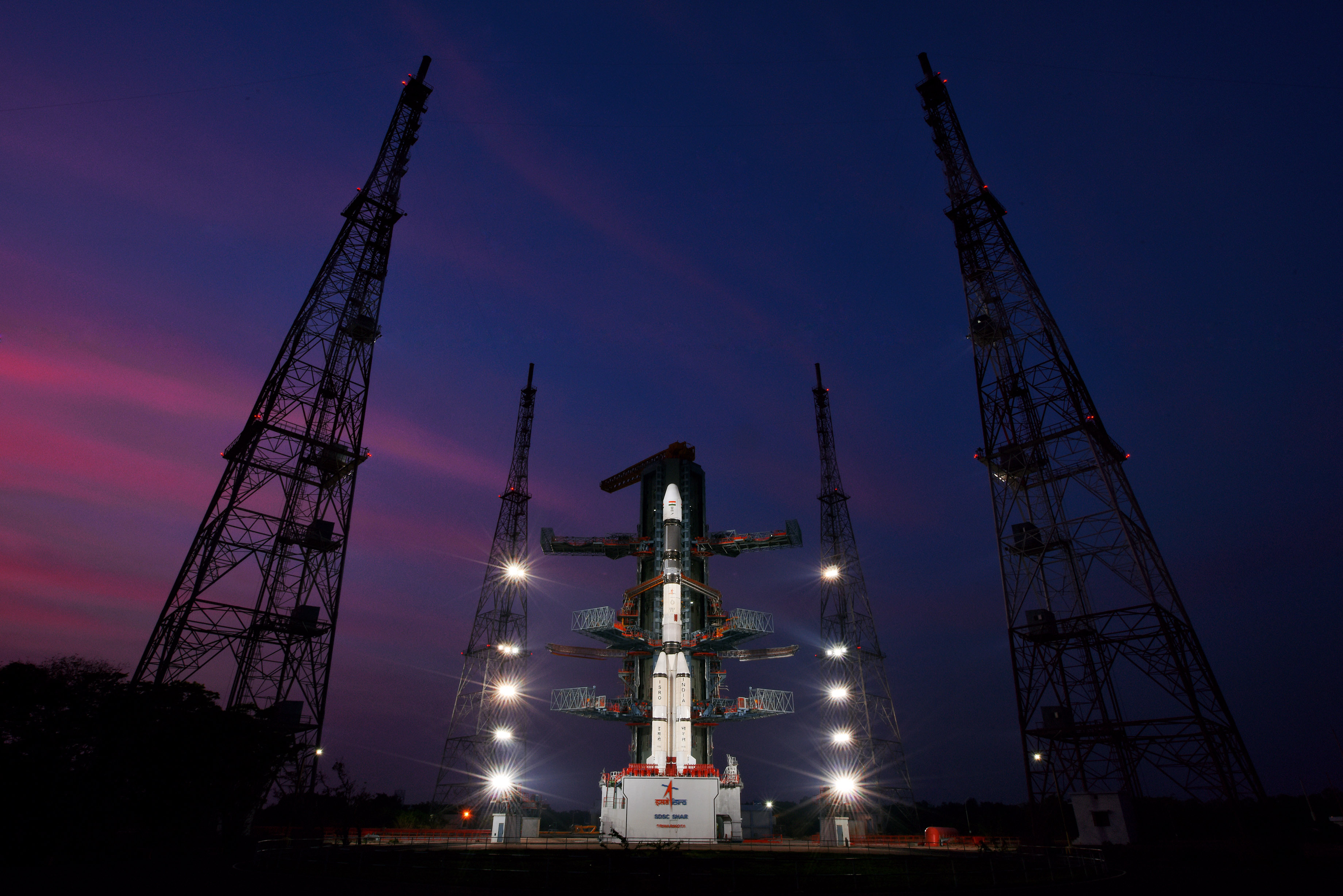
GSLV F11 vehicle at Second Launch Pad

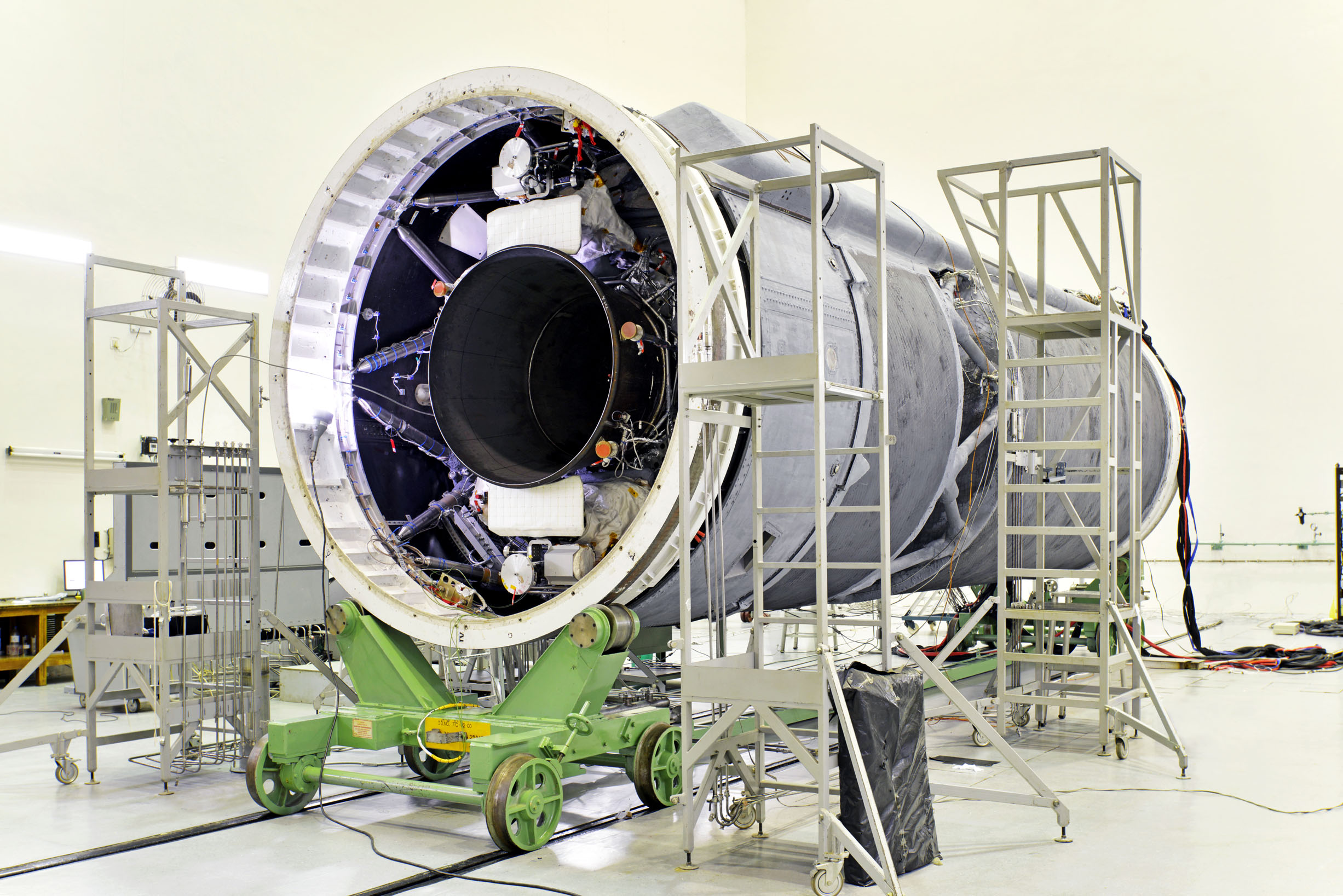
Indigenous Cryogenic Upper Stage CE-7.5 of GSLV

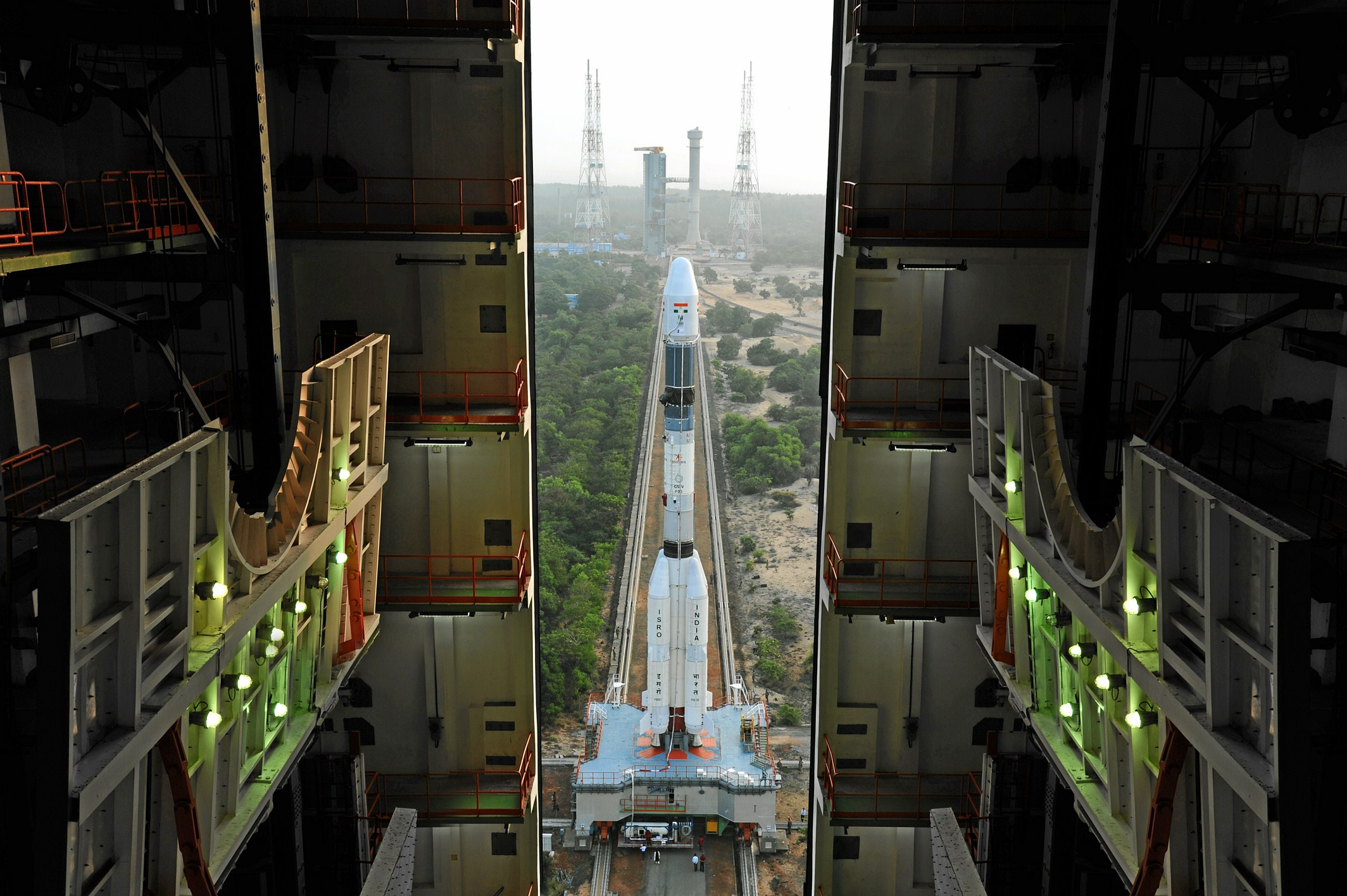
Fully integrated GSLV-F05 coming out of the Vehicle Assembly Building

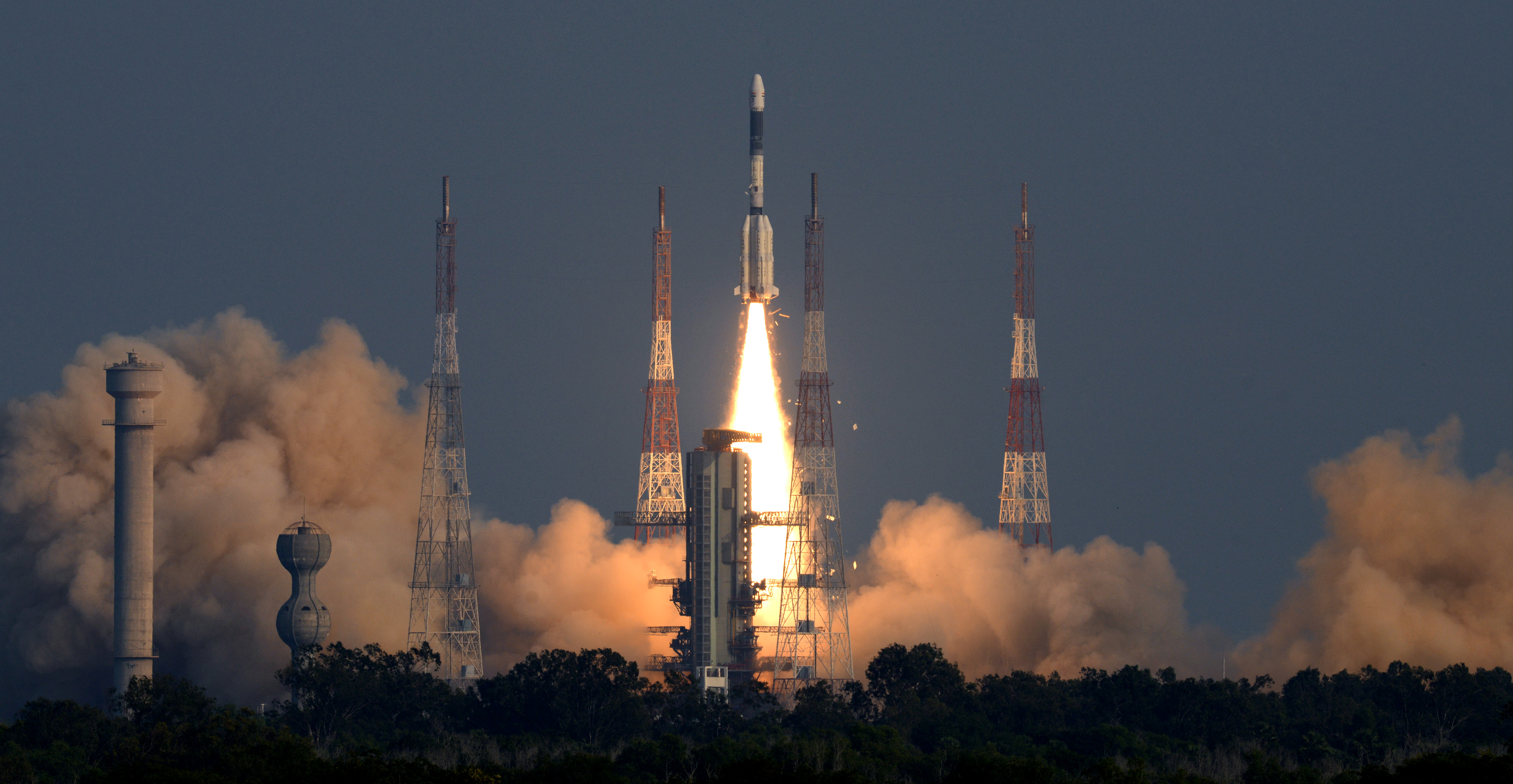
Launch of GSLV F11 from Second Launch Pad

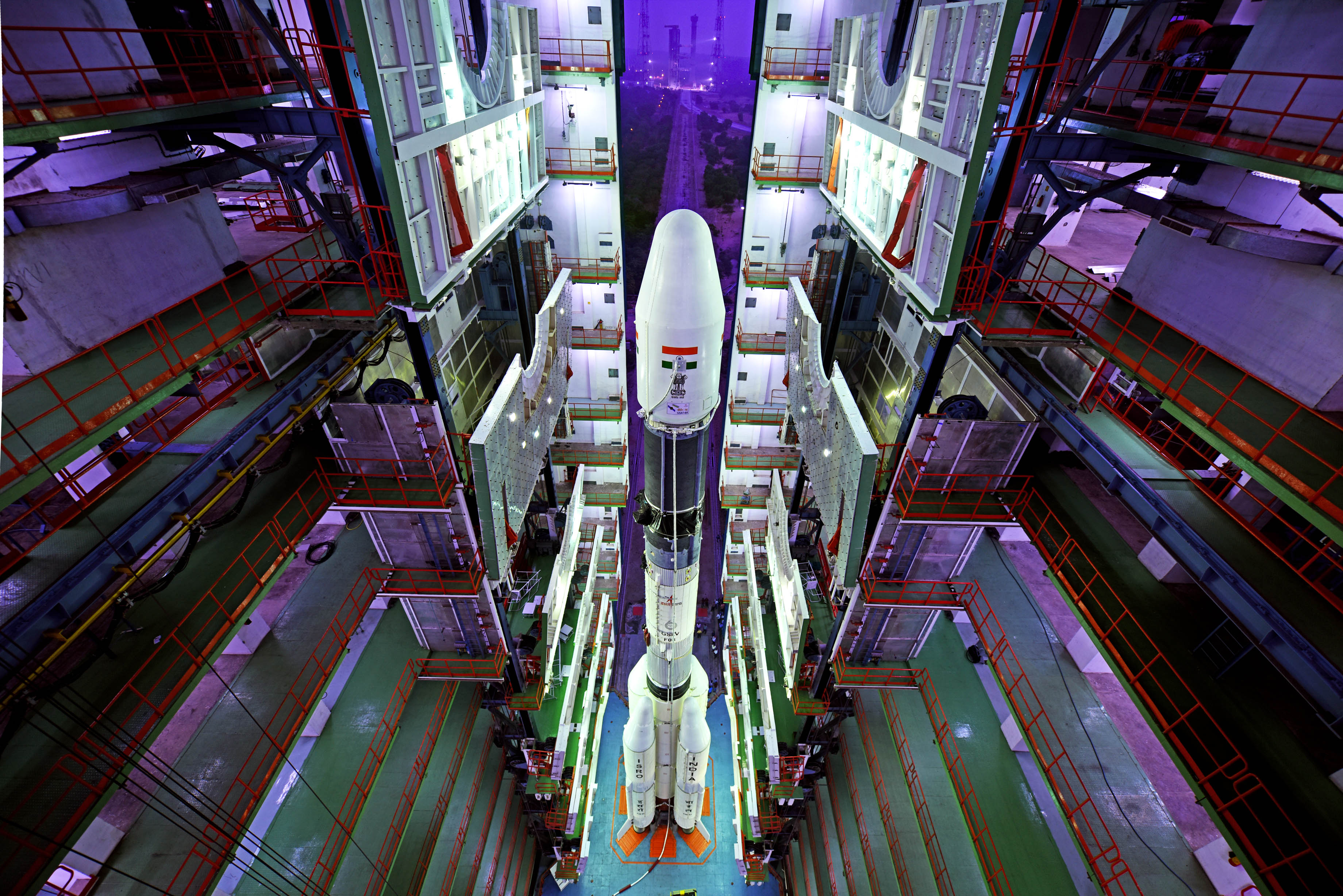
Top view of a fully Integrated GSLV-F08 inside the Vehicle Assembly Building

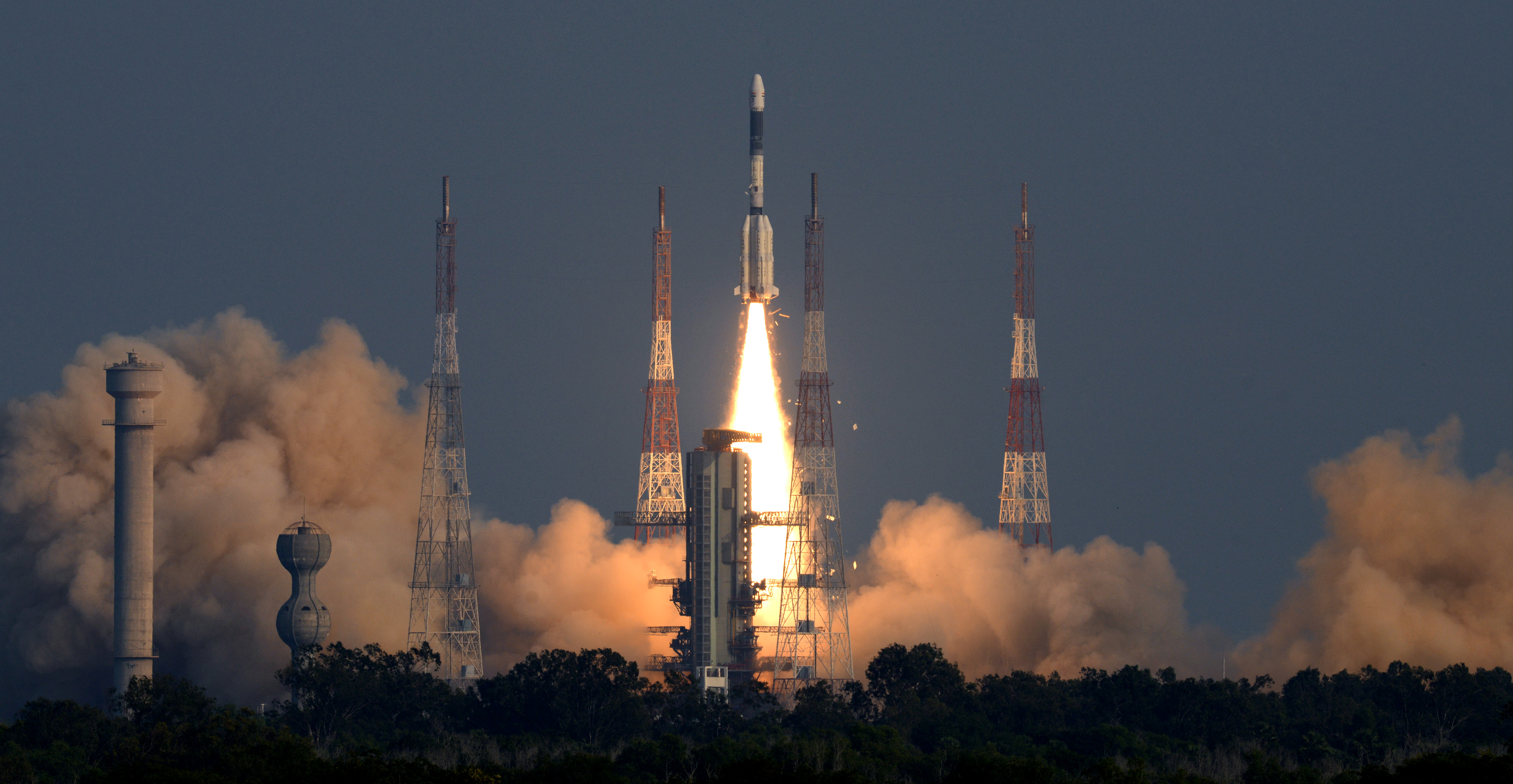
GSLV F11 launch

== See also ==
- SSLV
- Launch vehicles of ISRO
- Comparison of orbital launchers families
- Comparison of orbital launch systems
- PSLV
- LVM3
- NGLV
- ISRO
- ASLV
- SLV
