= GSAT-24 =

Indian communication satellite

- Names: GSAT-24, GSAT-N1
- Mission type: Communications
- Operator: NewSpace India Limited
- COSPAR ID: 2022-067A
- SATCAT no.: 52903
- Website: https://www.isro.gov.in/
- Mission duration: Planned: 15 years Elapsed: 4 years, 1 month and 13 days

Spacecraft properties
- Bus: I-3K Enhanced
- Manufacturer: ISRO
- Launch mass: 4,181.3 kg (9,218 lb)
- Dry mass: 1,774.9 kg (3,913 lb)

Start of mission
- Launch date: 22 June 2022 21:50(UTC)
- Rocket: Ariane 5
- Launch site: Guiana Space Centre, ELA-3
- Contractor: Arianespace

Orbital parameters
- Reference system: Geocentric
- Regime: Geostationary
- Slot: 83° East

Transponders
- Band: Ku band

GSAT-24 (also known as GSAT-N1) is an Indian Communication Satellite built by ISRO. The GSAT-N1 satellite is funded, owned and operated by New Space India Limited. Cost of spacecraft was around ₹400 crore. The entire capacity onboard GSAT-N1 satellite will be leased to Tata Play. The satellite was placed into orbit by using Ariane 5 rocket.

== Spacecraft overview ==
General specifications of GSAT-N1 are:

- Gross lift-off mass: 4,181.3 kilograms (9,218 lb)
- Dry mass: 1,774.9 kilograms (3,913 lb)

=== Payload ===
- 24 × Broadcasting-satellite service, Ku-band transponders
- 1 × Fixed-satellite service, Ku-band transponder
- 2 × Ku-band beacons
- 2.5 metres (8 ft 2 in) diameter Ku-band Transmit/Receive Gregorian antenna
- TT&C in both C-band and Ku-band

=== Power ===
- 70V fully regulated bus
- 8.5 kW payload power
- 12 kW power generation (EOL) using solar panels
- 2 × 180Ah Li-ion battery

=== Propulsion ===
- 16 × bipropellant thrusters
- 440N Liquid Apogee Motor (LAM) with area ratio of 250
- 2 × 1,207 litres (266 imp gal; 319 US gal) propellant tank
- 2 × 67 litres (15 imp gal; 18 US gal) pressurant tank

== Launch ==
GSAT-N1 was launched on 22 June 2022 at 21:50 (UTC) along with MEASAT-3d aboard an Ariane 5 launch vehicle under VA257 campaign.

== See also ==
- GSAT
- List of Indian satellites
- List of Ariane launches (2020–2029)
