= GSAT-2 =

Communication Satellite built by ISRO

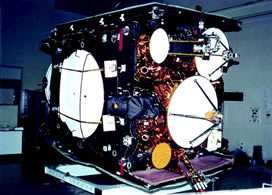
- Mission type: Communications
- Operator: ISRO
- COSPAR ID: 2003-018A
- SATCAT no.: 27807
- Website: www.isro.org/satellites/gsat-2.aspx
- Mission duration: 3-5 years

Spacecraft properties
- Bus: I-2K
- Manufacturer: ISRO
- Launch mass: 1,825 kilograms (4,023 lb)

Start of mission
- Launch date: 8 May 2003, 11:28 UTC
- Rocket: GSLV Mk.I D2
- Launch site: Sriharikota FLP
- Contractor: ISRO

Orbital parameters
- Reference system: Geocentric
- Regime: Geostationary
- Longitude: 47.95° east
- Perigee altitude: 35,904 kilometres (22,310 mi)
- Apogee altitude: 35,920 kilometres (22,320 mi)
- Inclination: 2.43 degrees
- Period: 24.03 hours
- Epoch: 29 October 2013, 19:06:36 UTC

GSAT-2 was an experimental communication satellite built by the Indian Space Research Organisation (ISRO) and launched on one of the first GSLVs. The satellite was positioned at 48 deg east longitude in the geo-stationary orbit.

== Payloads ==
GSAT-2 carried four C-band transponders, two K_{u} band transponders and a Mobile Satellite Service (MSS) payload operating in S-band forward link and C-band return link. Besides the communication payloads, GSAT-2 carried the following four piggyback experimental payloads:

- Total Radiation Dose Monitor (TRDM) to compare the estimated radiation doses inside the satellite with the directly measured radiation doses using a Radiation Sensitive Field Effect Transistor (RADFET)
- Surface Charge Monitor (SCM) to indicate the state of the charging environment in the vicinity of the spacecraft
- Solar X-ray Spectrometer (SOXS) to study the solar flare emission in 4 keV - 60 keV energy range using state of the art semiconductor devices and Phoswich Scintillation Detector
- Coherent Radio Beacon Experiment (CRABEX) to investigate the spatial structure, dynamic and temporal variations of Ionosphere and several aspects of equatorial electrodynamics

Weighing 1,800 kilograms (4,000 lb) at launch, GSAT-2 incorporated a 440 Newton Liquid Apogee Motor (LAM) and sixteen 22 Newton Reaction Control Thrusters for raising the satellite's orbit from Geo-stationary Transfer orbit to its final geo- stationary orbit as well as for its attitude control. It carried 840 kilograms (1,850 lb) of propellant (monomethyl hydrazine and MON-3).

== Measurements ==
GSAT-2 measures 9.55 metres (31.3 ft) in length in its final in-orbit configuration. It is 3-axis body stabilised using Sun and Earth sensors, momentum and reaction wheels, magnetic torquers and bi-propellant thrusters. Its solar array generates 1380 W power, backed up by two 24 A·h Ni-Cd batteries.

== Positioning ==
After its launch into Geo-synchronous transfer orbit by GSLV-D2, GSAT-2 it was taken to its final geo-stationary orbit by firing the liquid apogee motor in phases. After it reached the geo-stationary orbit, its antenna and solar Panels were deployed and the satellite was finally placed in its allocated slot of 48° east longitude.

== See also ==
- List of Indian satellites
