= GSAT-6A =

Indian telecommunications satellite

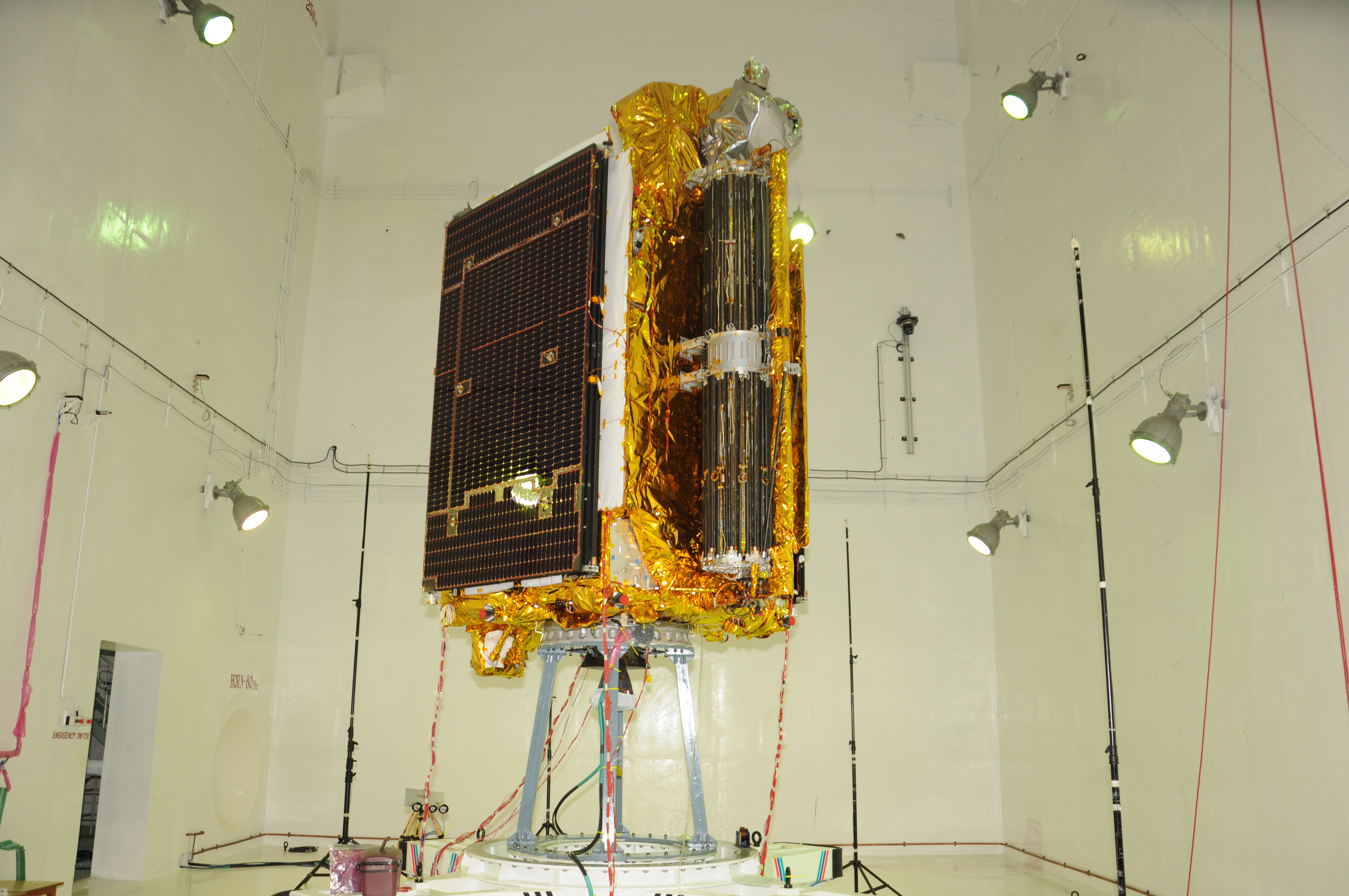
- Mission type: Communications
- Operator: ISRO
- COSPAR ID: 2018-027A
- SATCAT no.: 43241
- Website: www.isro.gov.in/Spacecraft/gsat-6a
- Mission duration: Planned: 10 years

Spacecraft properties
- Bus: I-2K
- Manufacturer: ISRO Satellite Centre; Space Applications Centre
- Launch mass: 2,117 kilograms (4,667 lb)
- Dimensions: 1.53 × 1.65 × 2.4 m (5.0 × 5.4 × 7.9 ft)
- Power: 3,119 watts

Start of mission
- Launch date: 29 March 2018, 11:26 UTC
- Rocket: GSLV Mk.II F08
- Launch site: Satish Dhawan SLP
- Contractor: ISRO
- Entered service: Failed before being operational

Orbital parameters
- Reference system: Geocentric
- Regime: Geostationary
- Slot: 83°E (Planned)
- Semi-major axis: 37,552 kilometers (20,276 nmi)
- Eccentricity: 0.1383056
- Perigee altitude: 29,580 kilometers (15,970 nmi)
- Apogee altitude: 36,367 kilometers (19,637 nmi)
- Inclination: 3.29 degrees
- Period: 20.8 hours
- RAAN: 158.9 degrees
- Argument of perigee: 184.72 degrees
- Mean anomaly: 125.81 degrees
- Mean motion: 1.19302622
- Epoch: April 11, 2018
- Revolution no.: 17

Transponders
- Coverage area: India

GSAT-6A was a communication satellite launched by the Indian Space Research Organisation (ISRO). It featured a 6-metre (20 ft) unfurlable S-band antenna similar to the one used on GSAT-6. Around 17 minutes after lift-off, the three stage GSLV Mk.II rocket flying on GSLV F08 mission successfully injected the satellite into a geosynchronous transfer orbit. Due to power failure during its orbit raising burns the communication was lost with GSAT-6A before it could reach its final circular geostationary orbit (GSO).

== History ==
GSAT-6A was launched to complement GSAT-6 satellite which was launched in August 2015 by ISRO. The cost of building GSAT-6A was around ₹270 crore. GSAT-6A was to provide mobile communication services to the Indian Armed Forces.

== Launch ==
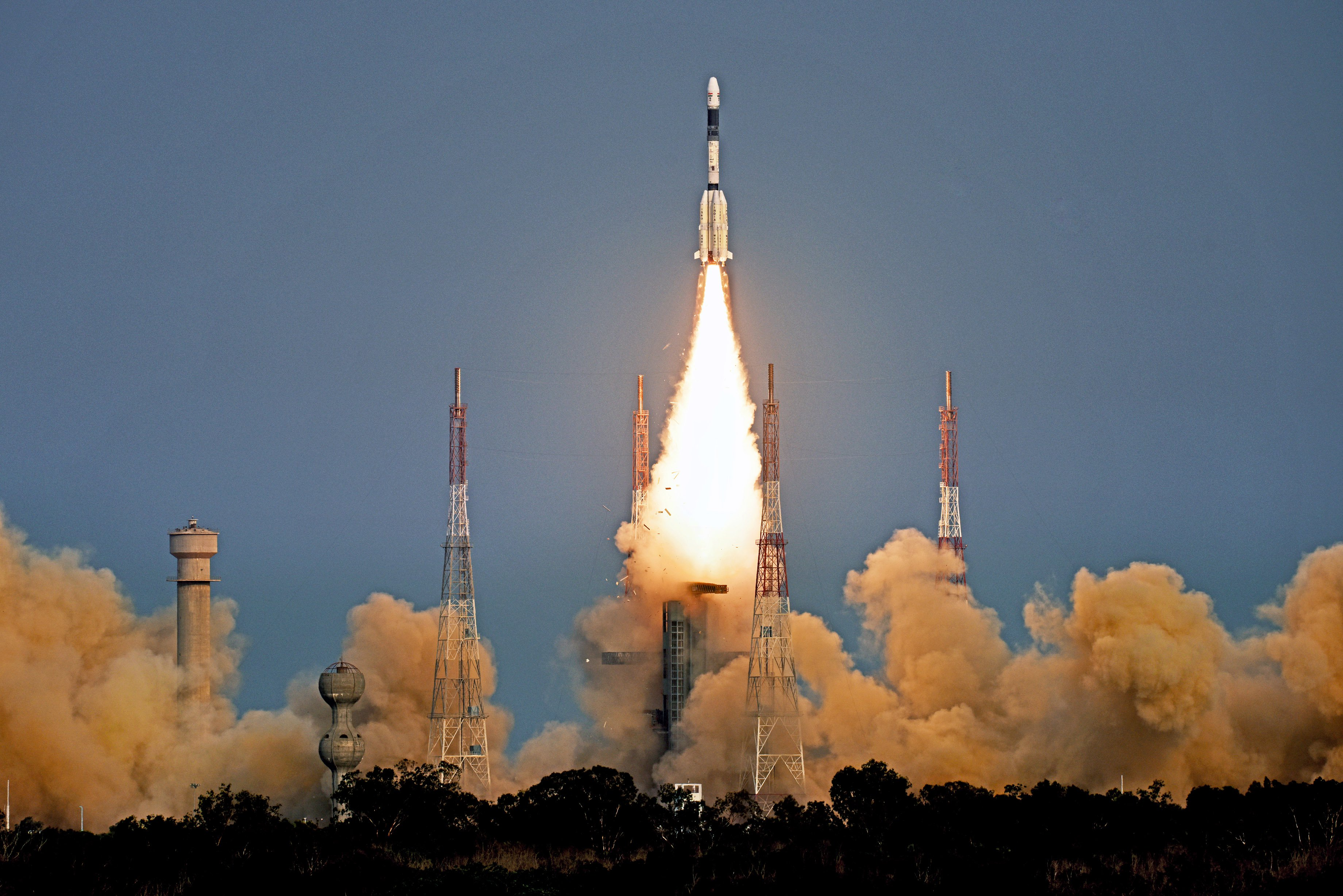
GSLV F08 launch from SLP

GSLV-F08 carrying GSAT-6A spacecraft was launched from Second Launch Pad of Satish Dhawan Space Centre on 29 March 2018, 11:26 UTC and after flight of 17 minutes 45 seconds, placed GSAT-6A into its planned geostationary transfer orbit with 36,692.5 kilometres (22,799.7 mi) apogee, 169.4 kilometres (105.3 mi) perigee and orbital inclination of 20.64°. GSAT-6A spacecraft deployed its solar array after separation from CUS and established contact with ground station.

On GSLV-F08, a High Thrust Vikas engine (HTVE) was inducted on second stage (GS2) of GSLV with 6% higher thrust than before. The improved engine increased the payload capability of the vehicle. The electrohydraulic actuation system on second stage was also replaced with simpler and robust electromechanical system. The Cryogenic Upper Stage of GSLV F08 performed a burn to depletion for the first time. Officials said any improvement done to the vehicle would be incorporated into GSLV's future missions.

=== Loss of communication ===
The first orbit raising maneuver for GSAT-6A was carried out as planned on 30 March 2018 by firing the Liquid Apogee Motor (LAM) for 2188 seconds from 09:22 AM IST. The second orbit raising maneuver was carried out at 10:00 AM on 31 March 2018. As the satellite was on-course for its third and final orbit raising maneuver on 1 April 2018, communication with it was lost and the spacecraft was temporarily untraceable. After regaining its track, efforts to re-establish communication with the satellite could not succeed. Power system malfunction was suspected to be the reason behind loss of contact.

=== Satellite replacement ===
ISRO will launch GSAT-32 satellite as replacement for GSAT-6A.

== See also ==
- Indian military satellites
