= GSAT-20 =

Indian communications satellite

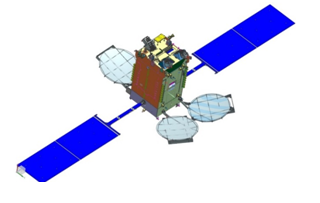
- Render of GSAT-N2
- Names: GSAT-20, GSAT-N2
- Mission type: Communications
- Operator: NewSpace India Limited
- COSPAR ID: 2024-214A
- SATCAT no.: 62028
- Website: https://www.isro.gov.in/
- Mission duration: Planned: 14 years Elapsed: 1 year, 10 months, 7 days

Spacecraft properties
- Bus: I-3K Bus
- Manufacturer: ISRO Satellite Centre; Space Applications Centre
- Launch mass: 4,700 kg (10,400 lb)

Start of mission
- Launch date: 18 November 2024, 18:30 UTC
- Rocket: Falcon 9 Block 5
- Launch site: Cape Canaveral, SLC‑40
- Contractor: SpaceX

Orbital parameters
- Reference system: Geocentric
- Regime: Geostationary
- Slot: 68° East

Transponders
- Band: Ku band

GSAT-20 (also known as GSAT-N2) is a communication satellite developed by ISRO and launched by a SpaceX Falcon 9. The GSAT-20 satellite is funded, owned and operated by New Space India Limited. The entire capacity onboard GSAT-N2 satellite was leased to Dish TV. GSAT-20 is a continuation of GSAT series of communication satellites. The satellite is intended to add data transmission capacity to the communication infrastructure required by Smart Cities Mission of India.

== Payload ==
The satellite features a Ka-band high-throughput communications payload with 70 Gbit/s throughput utilizing 40 beams offering HTS capacity of nearly 48 Gbit/s. Each beam has 2 polarisations, effectively making them 80 beams.

== Launch ==
The satellite was initially expected to be launched in 2024 on an LVM 3, but shifted to Falcon 9 due to the satellite being 700 kilograms (1,500 lb) overweight for a successful launch on indigenous platforms.

Hence, the commercial arm of ISRO, New Space India Limited signed a contract with SpaceX for a possible liftoff in the second quarter of 2024. The SpaceX deal is significant because India had previously relied on the France-led Arianespace consortium to launch its heavy communication satellites, including the now-retired Ariane 5, which ISRO was hoping to use as a backup. The fact that the next few launches of the Ariane 6, its successor having been both booked and delayed for launch, ISRO turned to SpaceX. India's own rockets lack the capacity for launching very heavy satellites to the geostationary orbit beyond 4-ton class, a problem that is planned to be fixed with the introduction of the NGLV.

== See also ==
- Indian Regional Navigational Satellite System
- GSAT
- List of Falcon 9 and Falcon Heavy launches
