= GEOStar-1 =

Satellite model by Northrop Grumman

The GEOStar-1 is a communications satellite spacecraft model made by Northrop Grumman Innovation Systems in the late 1990s for telecommunications in geosynchronous orbit. The GEOStar-1 satellite bus is designed for a 15-year mission and was compatible with the Ariane 4, Ariane 5, Delta II, Proton (rocket family), and Long March (rocket family).

== Satellite Orders ==
Satellite	Country	Operator	Type	Coverage	Launch date (GMT)	Rocket	Changes	Status
BSAT-2a	Japan	BSAT Corp	Television broadcasting	4 Ku-band	8 March 2001	Ariane 5G		Retired
BSAT-2b	Japan	BSAT Corp	Television broadcasting	4 Ku-band	12 July 2001	Ariane 5G		Partial launch failure
BSAT-2c	Japan	BSAT Corp	Television broadcasting	4 Ku-band	11 June 2003	Ariane 5G		Retired
IndoStar-1	Indonesia	Media Citra Indovision	Television broadcasting	5 S-band	12 November 1997	Ariane 44L		Retired
