= Broadcasting Satellite System Corporation =

Japanese satellite operator

The Broadcasting Satellite System Corporation (B-SAT) is a Japanese corporation established in April 1993 to procure, manage and lease transponders on communications satellites. Its largest stockholder, owning 49.9%, is NHK, the Japan Broadcasting Corporation. In 1994, it was ranked by Space News as the world's 19th largest fixed satellite operator.

== Satellite fleet ==
The B-SAT fleet has an extensive history. This is an overview of the satellites.

=== Former satellites ===
These satellites were managed by Broadcasting Satellite System Corporation but are now decommissioned.

==== BSAT-1a ====
BSAT-1a was an HS-376 based satellite with 4 active plus 4 spares K_{u}-band transponders. It was successfully launched on 16 April 1997 aboard an Ariane 44LP along Thaicom 3.

==== BSAT-1b ====
BSAT-1b was an HS-376 based satellite with 4 active plus 4 spares K_{u}-band transponders. It was successfully launched on 28 April 1998 aboard an Ariane 44P along Nilesat 101.

==== BSAT-2a ====
BSAT-2a was manufactured by Orbital Sciences Corporation based on the Star Bus platform. It was launched aboard an Ariane 5G rocket on 8 March 2001. BSAT-2a serves as an on orbit backup to BSAT-2c. BSAT-2a was decommissioned in January 2013.

==== BSAT-2b ====
BSAT-2b was a twin of BSAT-2a, also based on the Star Bus platform. Launched along Artemis aboard an Ariane 5G, it was left on an unusable orbit and that it couldn't compensate for. The electric propulsion Artemis, could use its higher efficiency ion drives, to reach operational orbit.

==== BSAT-2c ====
BSAT-2c was manufactured by Orbital Sciences Corporation Based on the Star Bus platform. It was launched aboard an Ariane 5 rocket on 11 June 2003. In-orbit delivery to B-SAT took place 15 July 2003. BSAT-2c was decommissioned in August 2013.

=== Current satellites ===
The current fleet of Broadcasting Satellite System Corporation as of August 2020 is composed of five spacecraft.

==== BSAT-3a ====
Launched on 14 August 2007 by an Ariane 5 ECA launch vehicle. It was manufactured by Lockheed Martin Commercial Space Systems based on the A2100A platform design, with a communications payload containing 12 Ku-band channels, eight of which operate at one time. Located in geostationary orbit at 110.0° East longitude, it replaced BSAT-1a and BSAT-1b.

==== BSAT-3b ====
B-SAT awarded Lockheed Martin the contract to build its next geostationary telecommunications satellite, BSAT-3b, which was launched by Arianespace aboard an Ariane 5 ECA (along with the Eutelsat W3B) on 28 October 2010.

==== BSAT-3c ====
BSAT-3c, also known as JCSAT-110R, is a satellite co-owned with SKY Perfect JSAT with each operator owning a separate payload. It was built by Lockheed Martin on its A2100A platform. It has two separate payloads with 12 K_{u}-band transponders each. It was successfully launched on 7 August 2011 on an Ariane 5 ECA along Astra 1N.

==== BSAT-4a ====
The first satellite of the fourth generation BSAT was built by SSL on its SSL 1300 platform. It has 24 K_{u}-band transponders and mass of 3,520 kilograms (7,760 lb). BSAT-4a launched on 29 September 2017 aboard an Ariane 5 ECA.

==== BSAT-4b ====
The second satellite of the fourth generation BSAT was built by Maxar Technologies on its SSL 1300 platform. It has 24 K_{u}-band transponders and mass around 3,530 kilograms (7,780 lb). BSAT-4b was launched aboard an Ariane 5 ECA on 15 August 2020.

=== Satellite list ===
Name	Bus	Payload	Order	Launch	Launch Vehicle	Launch Result	Launch Weight	Status	Remarks
BS-3N	AS-3000	3 K_{u}-band	—N/a	8 July 1994	Ariane 44L	Success	1,100 kilograms (2,400 lb)	Decommissioned in August 2011	Launched with PAS 2. Transferred to B-SAT in November 1998.
BSAT-1a	HS-376	4 K_{u}-band	1993	16 April 1997	Ariane 44LP	Success	1,236 kilograms (2,725 lb)	Decommissioned in August 2010	Launched with Thaicom 3.
BSAT-1b	HS-376	4 K_{u}-band	1993	28 April 1998	Ariane 44P	Success	1,236 kilograms (2,725 lb)	Decommissioned in August 2011	Launched with Nilesat 101.
BSAT-2a	STAR-1	4 K_{u}-band	1999	8 March 2001	Ariane 5G	Success	1,292 kilograms (2,848 lb)	Decommissioned in January 2013	Launched with Eurobird 1.
BSAT-2b	STAR-1	4 K_{u}-band	1999	12 July 2001	Ariane 5G	Failure	1,292 kilograms (2,848 lb)	Launch failure	Launched with Artemis. Launch failure left it in too low an orbit.
BSAT-2c	STAR-1	4 K_{u}-band	2001	11 June 2003	Ariane 5G	Success	1,275 kilograms (2,811 lb)	Decommissioned in August 2013	Launched with Optus C1.
BSAT-3a	A2100A	12 K_{u}-band	2005	14 August 2007	Ariane 5 ECA	Success	1,967 kilograms (4,336 lb)	Operational at 110.0° East	Launched along Spaceway-3.
BSAT-3b	A2100A	12 K_{u}-band	2008	28 October 2010	Ariane 5 ECA	Success	2,060 kilograms (4,540 lb)	Operational at 110.0° East	Launched with Eutelsat W3B.
BSAT-3c	A2100A	24 K_{u}-band and 24 C-band	2008	6 August 2011	Ariane 5 ECA	Success	2,910 kilograms (6,420 lb)	Operational at 110.0° East	Launched with Astra 1N. Co-owned with SKY Perfect JSAT, named as JCSAT-110R. Backup of N-SAT-110.
BSAT-4a	SSL 1300	24 K_{u}-band	2015	29 September 2017	Ariane 5 ECA	Success	3,520 kilograms (7,760 lb)	Operational at 110.0° East	Launched with Intelsat 37e
BSAT-4b	SSL 1300	24 K_{u}-band	2018	15 August 2020	Ariane 5 ECA	Success	3,530 kilograms (7,780 lb)	Success at 110.0° East	Launched with Galaxy 30 and MEV-2
