= BSAT-1b =

Japanese geostationary communications satellite

- Mission type: Communication
- Operator: JSAT Corporation
- COSPAR ID: 1998-024B
- SATCAT no.: 25312
- Mission duration: 13 years

Spacecraft properties
- Spacecraft: BSAT-1b
- Bus: HS-376
- Manufacturer: Hughes
- Launch mass: 1,236 kg (2,725 lb)
- BOL mass: 723 kg (1,594 lb)
- Dimensions: 3.15 m × 2.17 m (10.3 ft × 7.1 ft) (stowed for launch)
- Power: 1.2 kW

Start of mission
- Launch date: 22:53, April 28, 1998 (UTC)
- Rocket: Ariane 44P V-108
- Launch site: Kourou ELA-2
- Contractor: Arianespace
- Entered service: August 1, 1998

End of mission
- Disposal: placed in a graveyard orbit
- Deactivated: August 2011

Orbital parameters
- Reference system: Geocentric
- Regime: Graveyard orbit
- Semi-major axis: 42,373 km
- Perigee altitude: 35,987.0 km
- Apogee altitude: 36,018.1 km
- Inclination: 14.5°
- Period: 1,446.8 minutes
- Epoch: 00:00:00 2016-09-08

Transponders
- Band: K_{u} band: 4 (plus 4 spares)
- Coverage area: Japan
- TWTA power: 106 Watts

BSAT-1b was a geostationary communications satellite designed and manufactured by Hughes (now Boeing) on the HS-376 platform. It was originally ordered and operated by the Broadcasting Satellite System Corporation (B-SAT). It was used as backup of BSAT-1a to broadcast television channels for NHK and WOWOW over Japan. It had a pure K_{u} band payload and operated on the 110°E longitude until it was replaced, along its twin BSAT-1a, by BSAT-3a.

== Satellite description ==
The spacecraft was designed and manufactured by Hughes on the HS-376 satellite bus. This spin-stabilized platform had two main sections. One, the spinning section, was kept rotating at 50 rpm to maintain attitude, and a despun section that was used by the payload to maintain radio coverage. The spinning section included the Star-30BP Apogee kick motor, most of the attitude control, the power subsystem and the command and telemetry subsystems. The despun section contained the communications payload, including the antennas and transponders.

It had a launch mass of 1,236 kg (2,725 lb), a mass of 723 kg (1,594 lb) after reaching geostationary orbit and a 10-year design life. When stowed for launch, its dimensions were 3.15 m (10.3 ft) long and 2.17 m (7 ft 1 in) in diameter. With its solar panels fully extended it spanned 7.97 m (26.1 ft). Its power system generated approximately 1,200 Watts of power thanks to two cylindrical solar panels. It also had a NiH_{2} batteries for surviving solar eclipses. It would serve along BSAT-1a on the 110°E longitude position for the B-SAT.

Its payload was composed of a four active plus four spares K_{u} band transponders fed by a TWTA with an output power of 106 Watts. Its footprint covered Japan and its surrounding island.

== History ==
Broadcasting Satellite System Corporation (B-SAT) was founded in 1993 to broadcast by satellite the analog signals of NHK and WOWOW, including analog high definition Hi-Vision channels. In June 1994, it orders two HS-376 satellite from Hughes (now Boeing), BSAT-1a and BSAT-1b.

During 1997 B-SAT completed its Kawaguchi and Kimitsu satellite control centers, launched and commissioned BSAT-1a. At 22:53 UTC, April 28, 1998, the Ariane-44P flight V-108 successfully launched BSAT-1b, along Nilesat 101, from Kourou ELA-2 launch pad.

On August 1, 1998, BSAT-1b entered into commercial service. In December 2000, due to launch delays of BSAT-2a, BSAT-1b started digital broadcasting services for B-SAT.

During May 2005, B-SAT ordered BSAT-3a, the replacement satellite for BSAT-1a and BSAT-1b. It was successfully launched in August 2007, and accepted into the fleet the next month. During November, 2007 BSAT-3a took over the broadcasting of analog and digital signals from BSAT-1a and BSAT-1b. In August 2011, BSAT-1b was placed in a graveyard orbit and decommissioned.
