= Eutelsat Konnect =

Eutelsat telecommunications satellite

- Artist's impression of Eutelsat Konnect satellite
- Names: African Broadband Satellite
- Mission type: Communication
- Operator: Eutelsat
- COSPAR ID: 2020-005B
- SATCAT no.: 45027
- Mission duration: 15 years (planned)

Spacecraft properties
- Spacecraft type: SB NEO 100
- Bus: Spacebus NEO
- Manufacturer: Thales Alenia Space
- Launch mass: 3619 kg
- Power: 20 kW

Start of mission
- Launch date: 16 January 2020, 21:05:00 UTC
- Rocket: Ariane 5 ECA (VA-251)
- Launch site: Kourou, ELA-3
- Contractor: Arianespace

Orbital parameters
- Reference system: Geocentric orbit
- Regime: Geostationary orbit
- Longitude: 2.7° East

Transponders
- Band: Ka-band
- Coverage area: Europe, Sub-Saharan Africa

Eutelsat Konnect is a geostationary communications satellite operated by Eutelsat. The satellite was designed and manufactured by Thales Alenia Space on the Spacebus NEO 100 platform, and was launched on 16 January 2020 on an Ariane 5 ECA. The satellite provides broadband internet and communications coverage to Europe and Sub-Saharan Africa.

== History ==
In October 2015, Eutelsat ordered a next-generation communications satellite originally named the African Broadband Satellite. The satellite was ordered as part of Eutelsat's move to expand in the African communications market. Thales Alenia Space contracted launch on an Ariane 5 ECA, co-manifested with another payload as is usual, GSAT-30.

== Spacecraft ==
Eutelsat Konnect is built on the Spacebus NEO 100 platform, an all-electric satellite bus designed with funding and support from the European Space Agency (ESA) and the French agency, CNES. In addition to providing more communications capacity, the new platform provided significant manufacturing cost reductions compared to previous geostationary satellites. Eutelsat Konnect carries a high-throughput Ka-band communications payload, providing 75 Gbps of capacity through 65 spot beams.

== Launch ==
On 16 January 2020 at 21:05:00 UTC, Eutelsat Konnect was launched to on an Ariane 5 ECA. The launch was shared with Indian Space Research Organisation (ISRO) communications satellite GSAT-30. Approximately 28 minutes after launch, Eutelsat Konnect separated from the SYLDA fairing and was released into geostationary transfer orbit (GTO).
