= Cygnus (spacecraft) =

Uncrewed cargo spacecraft developed by Orbital Sciences

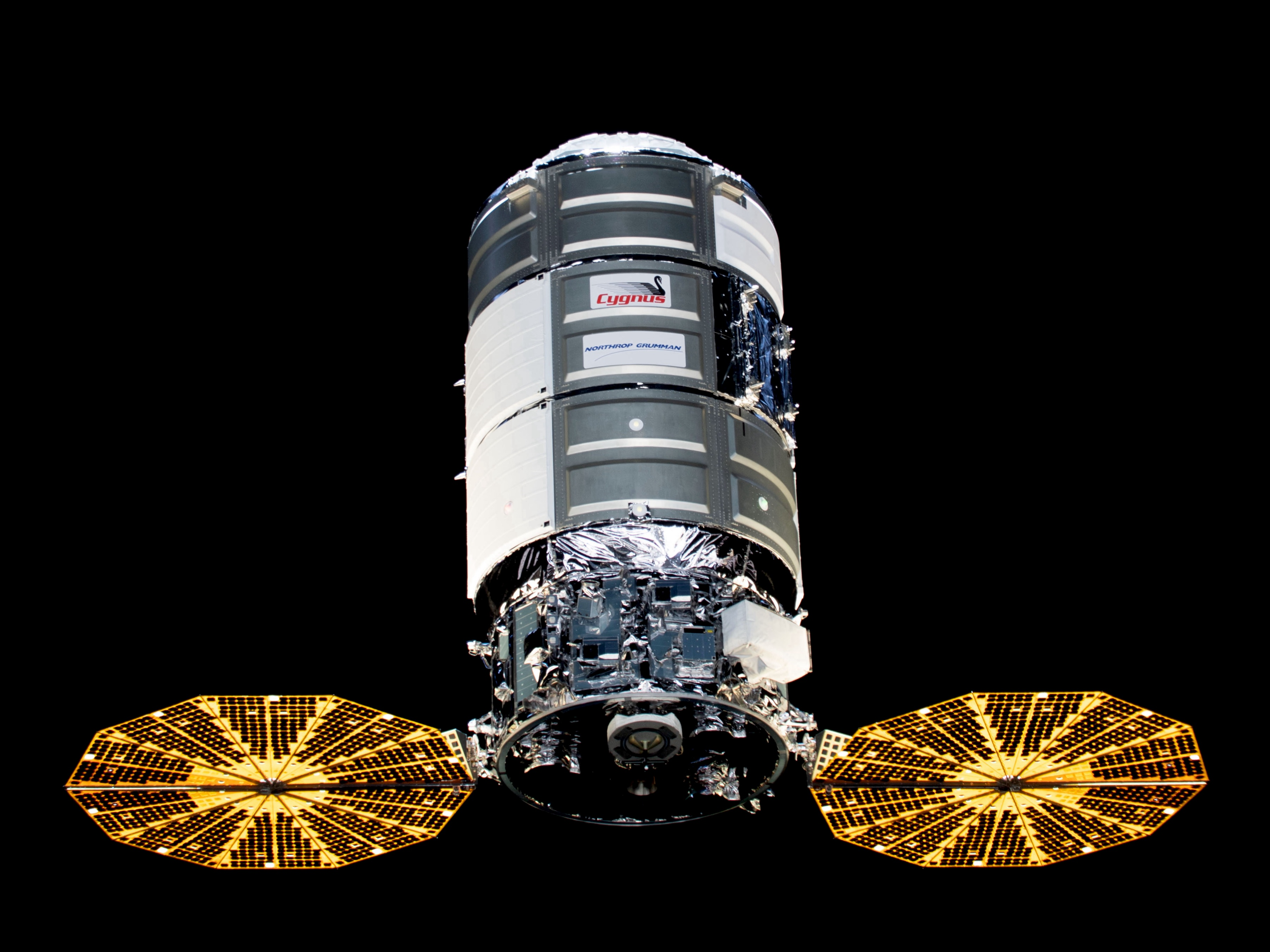
- Enhanced Cygnus spacecraft approaching the International Space Station for the NG-12 mission
- Manufacturer: Orbital Sciences (2013–2015); Orbital ATK (2015–2018); Northrop Grumman (2018–present); Thales Alenia Space (supplier, 2013–present)
- Country of origin: United States
- Operator: Orbital Sciences (2013–2015); Orbital ATK (2015–2018); Northrop Grumman (2018–present)
- Applications: ISS resupply; waste disposal

Specifications
- Spacecraft type: Cargo
- Bus: GEOStar
- Dry mass: Standard: 1,500 kg (3,300 lb); Enhanced: 1,800 kg (4,000 lb); XL: 2,300 kg (5,100 lb)
- Payload capacity: Standard: 2,000 kg (4,400 lb); Enhanced: 3,500 kg (7,700 lb); XL: 5,000 kg (11,000 lb)
- Volume: Standard: 18.9 m^{3} (670 cu ft); Enhanced: 27 m^{3} (950 cu ft); XL: 36 m^{3} (1,300 cu ft)
- Power: 3.5 kW
- Design life: 1 week to 2 years

Dimensions
- Length: Standard: 5.14 m (16.9 ft); Enhanced: 6.39 m (21.0 ft); XL: 8 m (26 ft)
- Diameter: 3.07 m (10.1 ft)

Production
- Status: In service
- On order: 2
- Built: 24
- Launched: 24
- Operational: 1 (NG-24)
- Retired: 22
- Lost: 1 (Orb-3)
- Maiden launch: September 18, 2013
- Last launch: April 11, 2026 (most recent)

Related spacecraft
- Launch vehicle: Antares, Atlas V, Falcon 9

Cygnus is an expendable American uncrewed cargo spacecraft developed for International Space Station (ISS) resupply missions. It was originally built by Orbital Sciences Corporation with financial support from NASA under the Commercial Orbital Transportation Services (COTS) program. The spacecraft consists of a pressurized cargo module—based largely on the Multi-Purpose Logistics Module and built by Thales Alenia Space—paired with a service module derived from Orbital's GEOStar, a satellite bus. Following a successful demonstration flight in 2013, Orbital was awarded a Commercial Resupply Services (CRS) contract.

Over time, Cygnus has been upgraded to increase its size and capabilities. The Enhanced Cygnus variant debuted in 2015, and the further enlarged Cygnus XL entered service in 2025. Features added over time include reboost capability to raise the ISS orbit, the ability to support late cargo loading shortly before launch, and the option to conduct secondary missions after undocking. Each mission ends with a controlled destructive reentry, which also provides a means of disposing of waste generated aboard the station. Alongside Cygnus, other ISS resupply spacecraft have included the Russian Progress, the European Automated Transfer Vehicle, the Japanese H-II Transfer Vehicle, and the American SpaceX Dragon.

Cygnus is typically launched on its parent company's Antares rocket from the Wallops Flight Facility in Virginia, but it can also fly aboard other launch vehicles. After an Antares failure destroyed Cygnus CRS Flight 3 and damaged Wallops in 2014, two subsequent missions launched on Atlas V rockets in 2015 and 2016. More recently, Cygnus missions have been launched on Falcon 9 rockets in 2024 and 2025, with another planned for 2026, under arrangements with CRS competitor SpaceX. The name Cygnus derives from the Greek word for swan and refers to the constellation.

== Development ==
After the Space Shuttle retirement was announced, NASA began to look for commercial space launch companies who could fly cargo to the ISS. In early 2006, the agency started its Commercial Orbital Transportation Services (COTS) program, where it would help fund the development of cargo spacecraft after a competitive process. SpaceX and Rocketplane Kistler won contracts in the COTS program, however Rocketplane Kistler failed to meet several financial milestones and on October 18, 2007, NASA announced it would terminate its contract and re-award it after a second competition.

Orbital Sciences Corporation participated in this second round, proposing a largely "off-the-shelf" design. The spacecraft, named Cygnus, would be built around a service module based on Orbital's Star Bus, a satellite bus in use since 1997, which would be attached to a pressurized cargo module built by Thales Alenia Space, which had also built the MPLM cargo module used by the Space Shuttle, the cargo module for the European ATV spacecraft and several permanent modules on the ISS.

Cygnus was awarded a COTS contract worth $170 million in February 2008, which was later increased to $288 million. On December 23, 2008, NASA awarded Orbital Sciences a $1.9 billion contract under the Commercial Resupply Services (CRS) program. Under this contract, Orbital Sciences agreed to deliver up to 20 tons of cargo to the ISS through 2016 in eight Cygnus spacecraft flights.

To propel Cygnus into space, Orbital developed the Antares rocket, which also leveraged lower-cost, off-the-shelf parts and designs. Construction and design of the first stage was subcontracted to Ukrainian companies and used refurbished NK-33 engines, remnants of the Soviet N1 moon rocket. The second stage was the Castor 30, which Orbital had previously used on another rocket project (the Minotaur-C) and was based on a Peacekeeper ICBM first stage.

The first Cygnus flight was originally planned to occur in December 2010, but was repeatedly delayed. The Antares made its maiden flight lifting a payload mass simulator to low Earth orbit on April 21, 2013. On September 18, 2013, Antares successfully launched a Cygnus spacecraft on a flight test to rendezvous with the International Space Station. On January 12, 2014, the first scheduled Cygnus resupply mission arrived at the space station; the capsule carried Christmas presents and fresh fruit for the astronauts. Its arrival was delayed, first by the need to repair the station, and then by frigid weather at the launch site and solar flares that forced postponements.

With the December 2015 launch of Orb CRS-4 on Atlas V, the enhanced version of Cygnus made its debut. While it was planned from the beginning to fly on the fifth mission, the Orb CRS-3 failure and subsequent move to Atlas V meant a delay. However, lessons learned on packing and the extra capabilities of the Atlas allowed payload to be increased to 3,500 kg (7,700 lb).

== Design ==
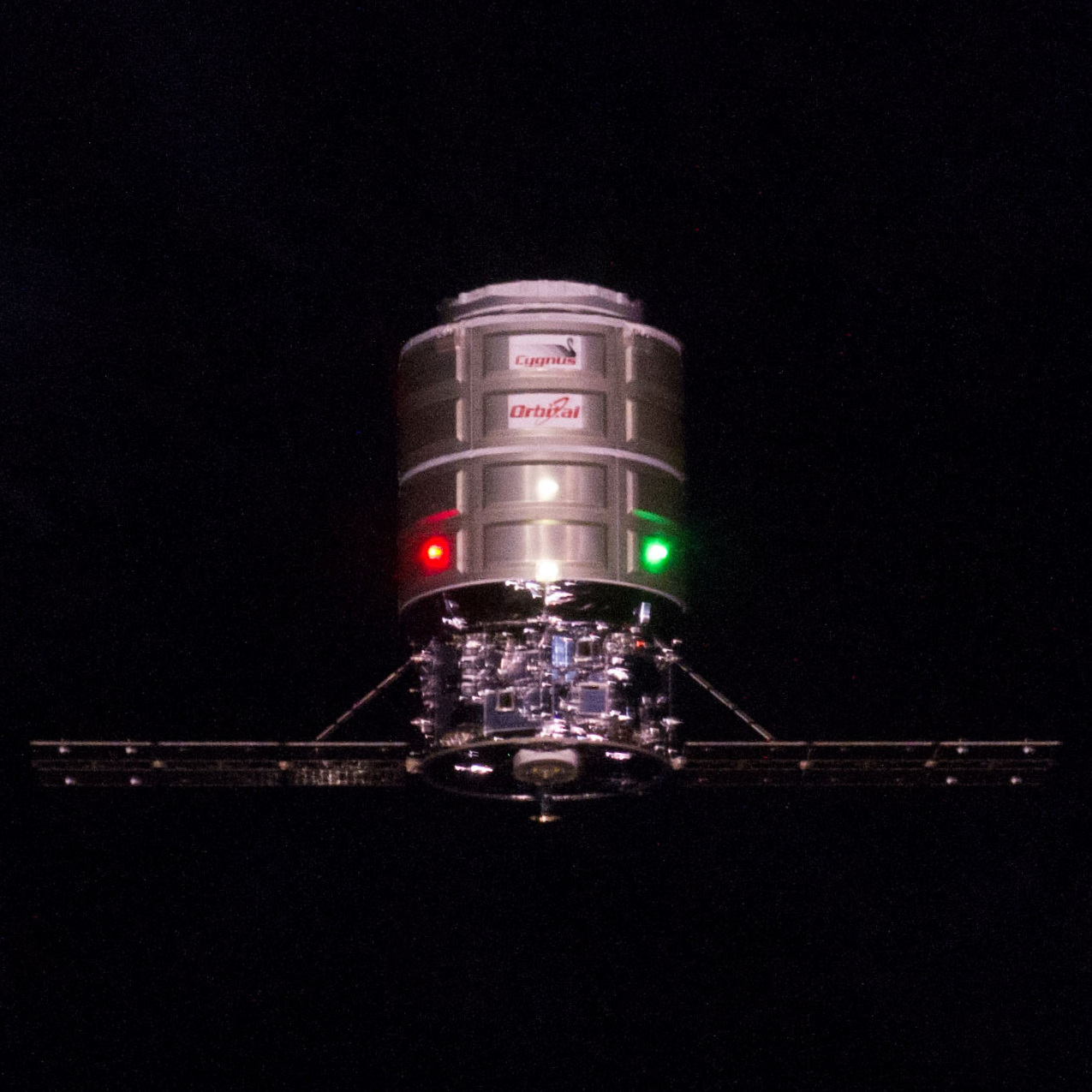
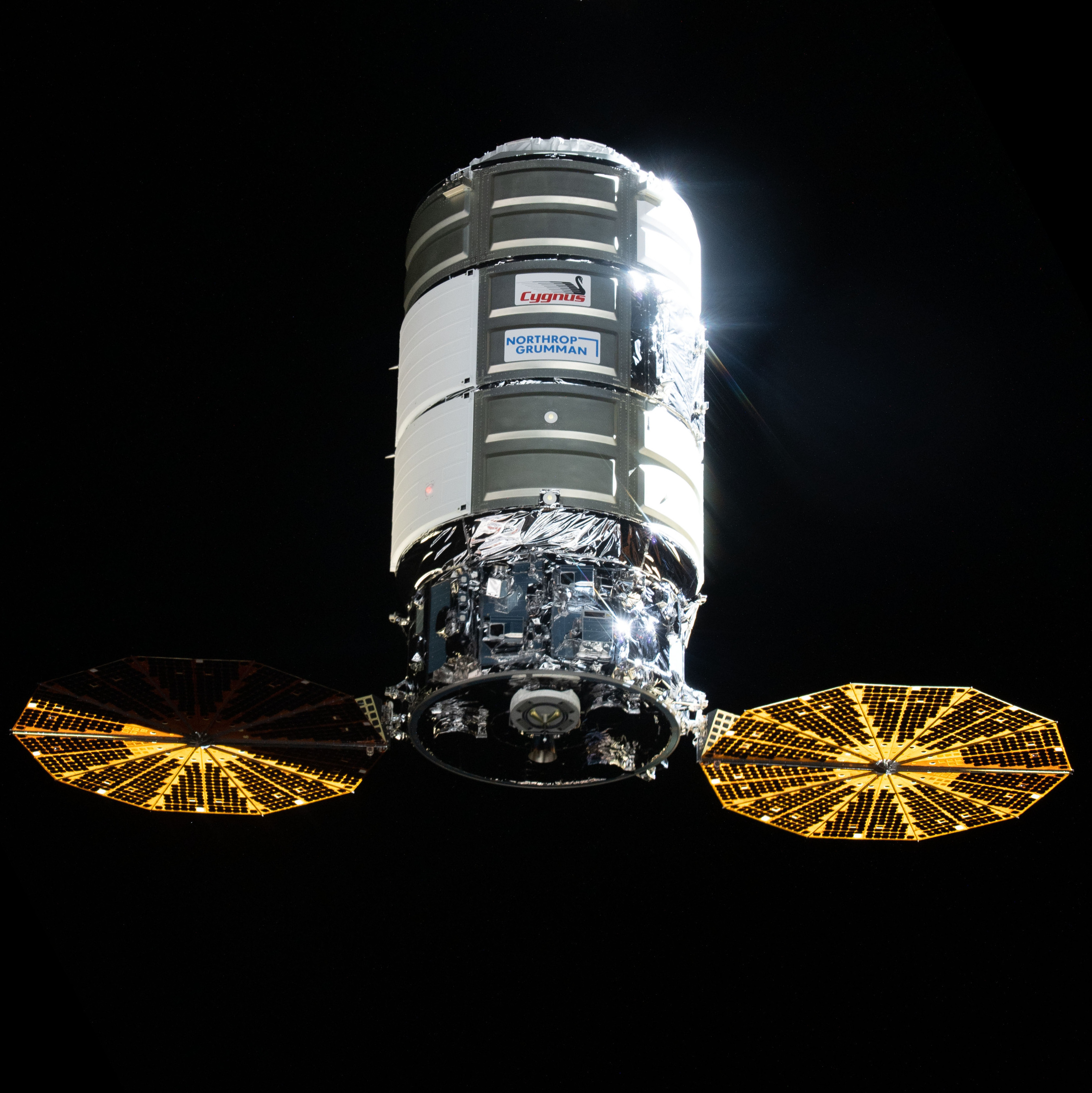
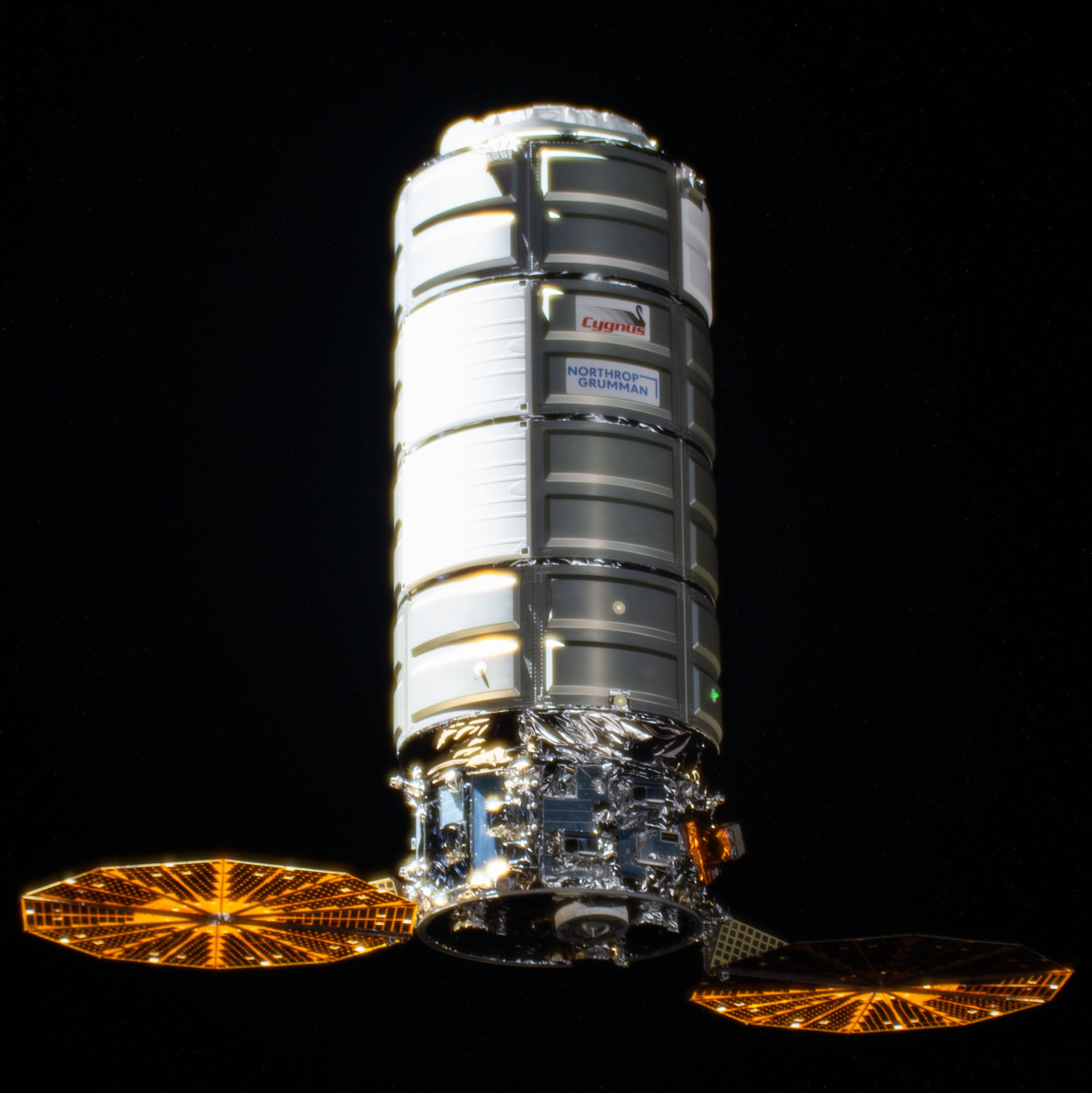
Comparison of Cygnus generations, from left to right: Standard, Enhanced, and XL

The Cygnus spacecraft consists of two basic components: the Service Module (SM) and the Pressurized Cargo Module (PCM).

The SM was based on prior products developed by Orbital including the GEOStar and LEOStar (collectively known as Star Bus) satellite buses and the Dawn spacecraft. It has a gross mass of 1,800 kg (4,000 lb), 32 thrusters for attitude control and one BT-4 main engine fueled with around 800 kilograms (1,800 lb) of hypergolic propellants, hydrazine and nitrogen tetroxide. The SM is capable of producing 3.5 kW of electrical power via two solar arrays. During a mission, Cygnus maneuvers close to the International Space Station, where the Canadarm2 robotic arm grapples the spacecraft and berths it to a Common Berthing Mechanism, typically the nadir (Earth facing) port of the Unity module.

The Pressurized Cargo Module (PCM) is manufactured by Thales Alenia Space in Turin, Italy and has been produced in several variants. The initial 1,500 kilograms (3,300 lb) (empty weight) Standard PCMs were 5.14 meters (16.9 ft) long, with a 2,000 kilograms (4,400 lb) payload capacity and 18.9 cubic meters (670 cu ft) of pressurized volume. The 1,800 kilograms (4,000 lb) (empty weight) Enhanced variant, introduced with the fourth Cygnus spacecraft, features a stretched PCM that is 6.39 meters (21.0 ft) long, increasing the payload capacity to 3,500 kilograms (7,700 lb), a 32% increase, and the volume to 27 cubic meters (950 cu ft), a 19.5% increase. Starting with the Enhanced variant, the solar panels were also upgraded to the UltraFlex, an accordion fanfold array, and the fuel load was increased to 1,218 kilograms (2,685 lb). Announced in August 2023, the even larger Cygnus XL began service with the NG-23 mission in September 2025. It measures 7.89 meters (25.9 ft) in length, carries a 5,000-kilogram (11,000 lb) payload, a 19.5% increase, and provides 36 cubic meters (1,300 cu ft) of volume (a 15.5% increase).

An earlier proposed version of Cygnus would have replaced the PCM with the Unpressurized Cargo Module (UCM), based on NASA's ExPRESS Logistics Carrier, and would have been used to transport unpressurized cargo, such as ISS Orbital Replacement Units. Another proposed variant would have replaced the PCM with the Return Cargo Module (RCM), which would have allowed Cygnus to return cargo to Earth.

Cygnus does not provide cargo return capability. However, it can be loaded with obsolete equipment, solid waste such as feces, and trash from the ISS which will burn up as the Cygnus makes a destructive reentry.

=== Proposed Lunar Gateway module variant ===
In August 2019, NASA decided to sole source its design for the Minimal Habitation Module (Habitation and Logistics Outpost, or HALO) of the Lunar Gateway to Northrop Grumman Innovation Systems, which offered a minimalist 6.1 m (20 ft) by 3 m (9.8 ft) design based directly on the Enhanced Cygnus, as well as a larger 7 m (23 ft) by 4.4 m (14 ft) design having radial docking ports, body-mounted radiators (BMRs), batteries and communications antennas added on the outside. Northrop Grumman Innovation Systems opted to build the minimalist design, which offered the advantage of component compatibility and expedited testing of life support systems on existing Cygnus spacecraft. On June 5, 2020, NASA awarded Northrop Grumman Innovation Systems a $187 million contract to complete the preliminary design of HALO. NASA will sign a separate contract with Northrop for the fabrication of the HALO, and for integration with the Power and Propulsion Element (PPE), being built by Maxar.

== Missions ==
The following list includes only missions that have flown and six planned missions. As of August 2024, one more mission is planned to be launched on the Falcon 9 rocket from Cape Canaveral Space Launch Complex 40, and three from Wallops on an Antares 330. Cygnus is the only cargo freighter to launch on four different launch vehicles: the Antares 100 series, Atlas V, Antares 200 series and Falcon 9 Block 5. Each mission is named for a notable member of the Human spaceflight community.

#	Mission and patch	Launch date (UTC)	Launch vehicle	Variant	Payload mass	Outcome	Ref.
1	Orb-D1; G. David Low (patch)	September 18, 2013, 14:58:00	Antares 110	Standard	1,299 lb (589 kg)	Success	
1	Orb-D1; G. David Low (patch)	First Cygnus mission, first mission to rendezvous with ISS, first mission to berth with ISS, second launch of Antares. Docking to ISS delayed due to a computer data link problem, which was later was resolved.					
2	Orb-1; C. Gordon Fullerton	January 9, 2014, 18:07:05	Antares 120	Standard	2,780 lb (1,260 kg)	Success	
2	Orb-1; C. Gordon Fullerton	First Commercial Resupply Service (CRS) mission for Cygnus, first Antares launch using the Castor 30B upper stage.					
3	Orb-2; Janice E. Voss	July 13, 2014, 16:52:14	Antares 120	Standard	3,293 lb (1,494 kg)	Success	
4	Orb-3; Deke Slayton	October 28, 2014, 22:22:38	Antares 130	Standard	4,883 lb (2,215 kg)	Failure	
4	Orb-3; Deke Slayton	First Antares launch to use Castor 30XL upperstage. Suffered a catastrophic anomaly resulting in an explosion shortly after launch, damaging launch pad. Contents of the cargo included food and packages for the crew, parts, experiments, and the Arkyd-3 flight test system from Planetary Resources.					
5	OA-4; Deke Slayton II	December 6, 2015, 21:44:57	Atlas V 401	Enhanced	7,746 lb (3,514 kg)	Success	
5	OA-4; Deke Slayton II	First flight of Enhanced Cygnus spacecraft. Due to damage at launch pad after the explosion of the Antares rocket carrying Orb-3, Orbital contracted with United Launch Alliance to launch this Cygnus on an Atlas V rocket from Cape Canaveral Air Force Station. First of three missions to fly on an Atlas V rocket.					
6	OA-6; Rick Husband	March 23, 2016, 03:05:52	Atlas V 401	Enhanced	7,758 lb (3,519 kg)	Success	
6	OA-6; Rick Husband	Second of three missions to fly on an Atlas V rocket.					
7	OA-5; Alan Poindexter	October 17, 2016, 23:45:36	Antares 230	Enhanced	5,163 lb (2,342 kg)	Success	
7	OA-5; Alan Poindexter	First flight of an Antares 200 series rocket.					
8	OA-7; John Glenn	April 18, 2017, 15:11:26	Atlas V 401	Enhanced	7,443 lb (3,376 kg)	Success	
8	OA-7; John Glenn	Third of three missions to fly on an Atlas V rocket.					
9	OA-8E; Gene Cernan	November 12, 2017, 12:19:51	Antares 230	Enhanced	7,359 lb (3,338 kg)	Success	
9	OA-8E; Gene Cernan	November 11, 2017, launch was scrubbed just before launch when a general aviation aircraft entered the hazard zone and did not respond to calls.					
10	OA-9E; J.R. Thompson	May 21, 2018, 08:44:06	Antares 230	Enhanced	7,385 lb (3,350 kg)	Success	
10	OA-9E; J.R. Thompson	First commercial vehicle to perform ISS reboosting when, at 20:25 UTC on July 10, 2018, Cygnus's main engine was fired for about 50 seconds. Raised ISS altitude by about 295 ft (90 m).					
11	NG-10; John Young	November 17, 2018, 09:01:31	Antares 230	Enhanced	7,386 lb (3,350 kg)	Success	
12	NG-11; Roger Chaffee	April 17, 2019, 20:46:07	Antares 230	Enhanced	7,575 lb (3,436 kg)	Success	
13	NG-12; Alan Bean	November 2, 2019, 13:59:47	Antares 230+	Enhanced	8,221 lb (3,729 kg)	Success	
14	NG-13; Robert H. Lawrence	February 15, 2020, 20:21:01	Antares 230+	Enhanced	8,009 lb (3,633 kg)	Success	
14	NG-13; Robert H. Lawrence	February 9, 2020, launch attempt scrubbed due to a ground support issue.					
15	NG-14; Kalpana Chawla	October 3, 2020, 01:16:14	Antares 230+	Enhanced	7,624 lb (3,458 kg)	Success	
15	NG-14; Kalpana Chawla	October 1, 2020, launch attempt delayed due to boat in range, later scrubbed due to a ground support issue.					
16	NG-15; Katherine Johnson	February 20, 2021, 17:36:50	Antares 230+	Enhanced	8,400 lb (3,800 kg)	Success	
17	NG-16; Ellison Onizuka	August 10, 2021, 22:01:05	Antares 230+	Enhanced	8,208 lb (3,723 kg)	Success	
18	NG-17; Piers Sellers	February 19, 2022, 17:40:03	Antares 230+	Enhanced	8,049 lb (3,651 kg)	Success	
18	NG-17; Piers Sellers	Performed the first operational reboost of ISS by a commercial vehicle on June 25, 2022, after it was aborted after few seconds on June 20, 2022.					
19	NG-18; Sally Ride	November 7, 2022, 10:32:42	Antares 230+	Enhanced	8,173 lb (3,707 kg)	Success	
19	NG-18; Sally Ride	November 6, 2022, launch attempt scrubbed due to fire alarm in mission control.					
20	NG-19; Laurel Clark	August 2, 2023, 00:31:14	Antares 230+	Enhanced	8,345 lb (3,785 kg)	Success	
20	NG-19; Laurel Clark	Final flight on an Antares 200 series rocket.					
21	NG-20; Patricia "Patty" Hilliard Robertson	January 30, 2024, 17:07:15	Falcon 9 Block 5 (B1077-10)	Enhanced	8,345 lb (3,785 kg)	Success	
21	NG-20; Patricia "Patty" Hilliard Robertson	Northrop Grumman contracted with SpaceX to launch this Cygnus on a Falcon 9 Block 5 rocket from Cape Canaveral Space Force Station. First of five missions to fly on a Falcon 9 Block 5 rocket.					
22	NG-21; Francis R. "Dick" Scobee	August 4, 2024, 15:02:23	Falcon 9 Block 5 (B1080-10)	Enhanced	8,503 lb (3,857 kg)	Success	
22	NG-21; Francis R. "Dick" Scobee	Second of five missions to fly on a Falcon 9 Block 5 rocket.					
—N/a	NG-22	June 2025 (planned)	Falcon 9 Block 5 (planned)	Enhanced	8,503 lb (3,857 kg)	Cancelled	
—N/a	NG-22	Cancelled due to damage during transatlantic crossing					
23	NG-23; William "Willie" C. McCool	September 14, 2025, 22:11	Falcon 9 Block 5 (B1094‑4)	XL	10,827 lb (4,911 kg)	Success	
23	NG-23; William "Willie" C. McCool	The NG-23 mission was the first flight of the extended Cygnus XL spacecraft and the third of five planned missions to fly on a Falcon 9 Block 5 rocket. During the flight, the spacecraft's planned engine burns were unexpectedly cut short, causing a delay in its arrival at the ISS.					
24	NG-24; Steven R. Nagel	April 11, 2026, 11:41	Falcon 9 Block 5 (B1094‑7)	XL	11,020 lb (5,000 kg)	Success	
24	NG-24; Steven R. Nagel	Fourth of five missions to fly on a Falcon 9 Block 5 rocket.					
25	NG-25; James "Jim" Lovell	November 29, 2026, 15:47	Falcon 9 Block 5	XL	≈11,000 lb (5,000 kg)	Planned	
25	NG-25; James "Jim" Lovell	Fifth of five missions to fly on a Falcon 9 Block 5 rocket.					

== See also ==
- Comparison of space station cargo vehicles
