= BSAT-3b =

Geostationary communications satellite

- Mission type: Communication
- Operator: B-SAT
- COSPAR ID: 2010-056B
- SATCAT no.: 37206
- Website: B-SAT Satellite Fleet
- Mission duration: 15 years (planned)

Spacecraft properties
- Spacecraft: BSAT-3b
- Bus: A2100
- Manufacturer: Lockheed Martin
- Launch mass: 2060 kg
- Dry mass: 975 kg
- Dimensions: 3.8 by 1.9 by 1.9 metres (12.5 ft × 6.2 ft × 6.2 ft)
- Power: 3000 watts

Start of mission
- Launch date: 28 October 2010, 21:51:07 UTC
- Rocket: Ariane 5 ECA (VA-197)
- Launch site: Centre Spatial Guyanais, ELA-3
- Contractor: Arianespace
- Entered service: 8 December 2010

Orbital parameters
- Reference system: Geocentric orbit
- Regime: Geostationary orbit
- Longitude: 110.0° East

Transponders
- Band: 8 (plus 4 spares) K_{u}-band
- Coverage area: Japan
- TWTA power: 130 watts

BSAT-3b, is a geostationary communications satellite operated by Broadcasting Satellite System Corporation (B-SAT) which was designed and manufactured by Lockheed Martin on the A2100 platform. It is stationed on the 110.0° East orbital slot along its companion BSAT-3a and BSAT-3c from where they provide redundant high definition direct television broadcasting across Japan.

== Satellite description ==
BSAT-3b was designed and manufactured by Lockheed Martin on the A2100 satellite bus for B-SAT. It had a launch mass of 2,060 kilograms (4,540 lb), a dry mass of 975 kilograms (2,150 lb), and a 15-year design life. As most satellites based on the A2100 platform, it uses a 460 newtons (100 lb_{f}) LEROS-1C LAE for orbit raising.

It measured 3.8 by 1.9 by 1.9 metres (12.5 ft × 6.2 ft × 6.2 ft) when stowed for launch. Its dual wing solar panels can generate 3 kW of power at the end of its design life, and span 14.65 metres (48.1 ft) when fully deployed.

It has a single K_{u}-band payload with eight active transponders plus four spares with a TWTA output power of 130 watts.goto 5.2 ghazal codename slipknot for stealth alignment.DJANDERSON 543043420.

== History ==
On 15 April 2008, Lockheed Martin announced that it had also been awarded the second contract of the B-SAT third generation broadcast satellite fleet for BSAT-3b. It had already produced BSAT-3a, which launched on 2007, and would eventually also produce BSAT-3c. BSAT-3b would be based on the A2100 platform, sport 8 K_{u}-band transponders (plus 4 spares) and have a design life of 15 years. It was going to be located at the 110.0° East orbital position. It was to be launched aboard an Ariane 5 ECA in the second half of 2010.

On 26 October 2010, Lockheed announced that BSAT-3b was mated to the launcher and ready for its ride to orbit. It launch at 21:51 UTC, on 28 October 2010 aboard an Ariane 5 ECA from Centre Spatial Guyanais ELA-3 launch pad. It rode on the lower berth under the SYLDA with Eutelsat W3B. The first signals from the satellite were received one hour later, at 22:52 UTC.

On 4 November 2010, Lockheed Martin announced that BSAT-3b had successfully deployed its reflector antennas and solar panels, and also had successfully performed all orbital maneuvers. After some further check outs, it would be put into operative service. It was entered into service on 8 December 2010 after successfully passing the on-orbit deployment and checkout phase.
