= BSAT-4b =

Telecommunications satellite

- Mission type: Direct-to-Home TV services
- Operator: B-SAT
- COSPAR ID: 2020-056A
- SATCAT no.: 46112
- Website: B-SAT (Japanese)
- Mission duration: 15 years (planned)

Spacecraft properties
- Spacecraft: BSAT-4b
- Bus: SSL 1300
- Manufacturer: Maxar Technologies
- Launch mass: 3530 kg

Start of mission
- Launch date: 15 August 2020, 22:04 UTC
- Rocket: Ariane 5 ECA
- Launch site: Guiana Space Center, ELA-3
- Contractor: Arianespace

Orbital parameters
- Reference system: Geocentric orbit
- Regime: Geostationary orbit
- Longitude: 110.0° East

Transponders
- Band: 24 K_{u}-band

BSAT-4b, is a geostationary communications satellite ordered by Broadcasting Satellite System Corporation and designed and manufactured by SSL of Maxar Technologies on the SSL 1300 platform. It is expected to be stationed on the 110.0° East orbital latitude for direct television broadcasting of 4K and 8K Ultra HD television resolutions.

== Satellite description ==
BSAT-4b was designed and manufactured by SSL, a subsidiary of Maxar Technologies, on the SSL 1300 satellite bus for Broadcasting Satellite System Corporation. It has an estimated launch mass of 3,530 kilograms (7,780 lb) with a 15-year design life.

It will have a single K_{u}-band payload with 24 transponders. It will cover Japan with 4K and 8K Ultra HD television satellite service.

== History ==
On 24 March 2018, B-SAT ordered the second of its fourth generation satellite from SSL, BSAT-4b. It was expected to be weight around 3,530 kilograms (7,780 lb), have 24 K_{u}-band transponders with a 15-year design life. At the time, it was expected for a launch in June 2020. It was to serve as a backup to BSAT-4a, and enter service before the Tokyo 2020 Olympics.

On 19 April 2018, Arianespace was contracted for an Ariane 5 ECA launch service. On 1 July 2020, the satellite was delivered to French Guiana inside a container supplied by RUAG Space

== Launch ==
The satellite was launched on 15 August 2020 at 22:04 UTC.
