= BSAT =

The acronym BSAT or B-SAT may mean:

- Biological Select Agents and Toxin (BSAT), usually called Select agent
- Boolean satisfiability problem (B-SAT or BSAT), a problem in computer science
- Broadcasting Satellite System Corporation (B-SAT), a Japanese corporation
