= GSAT-31 =

Indian telecommunications satellite

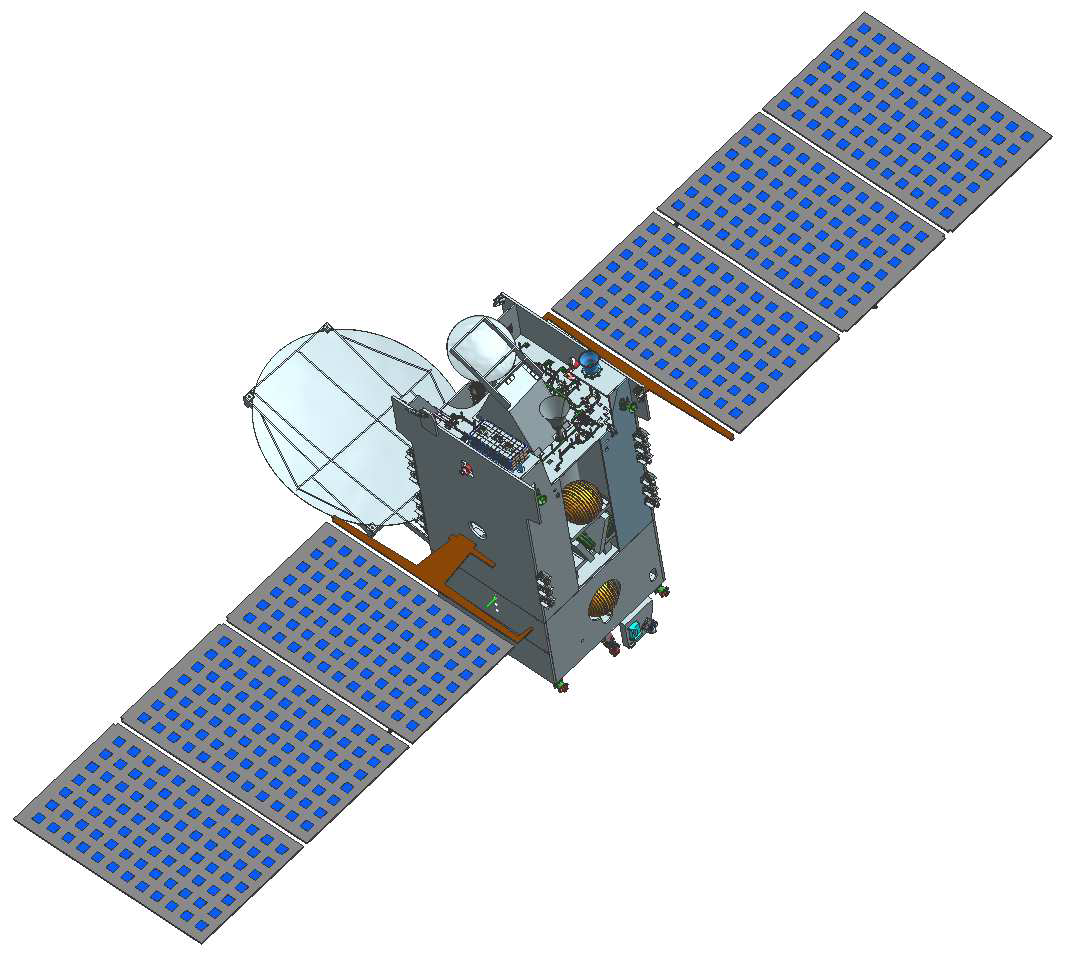
- GSAT-31 in deployed configuration
- Mission type: Communication
- Operator: ISRO
- COSPAR ID: 2019-007B
- SATCAT no.: 44035
- Mission duration: Planned: 15 years Elapsed: 6 years, 2 months, 23 days

Spacecraft properties
- Bus: I-2K
- Manufacturer: ISRO Satellite Centre; Space Applications Centre
- Launch mass: 2,536 kg (5,591 lb)
- Power: solar arrays, batteries

Start of mission
- Launch date: 6 February 2019
- Rocket: Ariance 5 VCA
- Launch site: Kourou ELA-3
- Contractor: Arianespace

Orbital parameters
- Reference system: Geocentric
- Regime: Geostationary
- Slot: 82.95°E; 48°E (Feb to Sept 2019)

Transponders
- Band: K_{u}

GSAT-31 is a high-throughput telecommunication satellite developed by the Indian Space Research Organisation (ISRO).

== Mission ==
The satellite's main communication payload is Ku band and acts as a replacement of the aging INSAT-4CR. The satellite provides advanced telecommunication to the Indian subcontinent. It is used for VSAT networks, television uplinks, digital signage new gathering, DTH services and other communication systems. This is the 40th communication satellite launched by ISRO and the 22nd launch of ISRO satellite by Arianespace.

== Launch ==
The satellite was launched through the 103rd flight of Ariane 5 ECA on 5 February 2019 at 21:01 UTC, the vehicle also deployed Hellas-Sat-4/SaudiGeoSat-1.

The launch of the GSAT-30 and GSAT-31 by Arianespace is expected to cost Rs 950 crore.

== Relocation ==
In July 2019, GSAT-31 maneuvered to lower its altitude and drifted eastward to reach new slot at 82.95°E on 31 August 2019.
