= Cygnus NG-12 =

2019 American resupply spaceflight to the ISS

NG-12
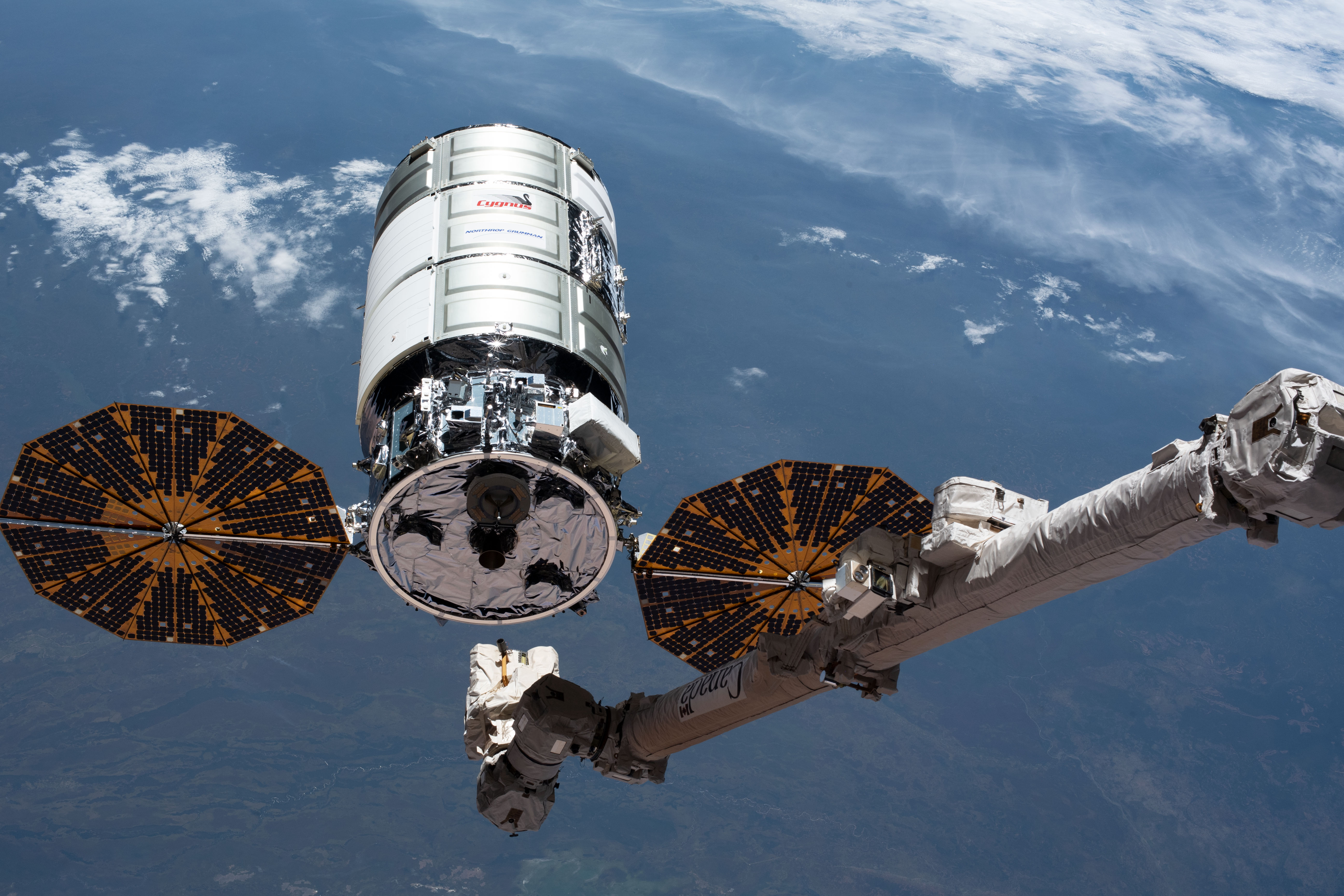
- Canadarm2 approaches the S.S. Alan Bean
- Names: CRS NG-12; CRS OA-12 (2016–2018)
- Mission type: ISS resupply
- Operator: Northrop Grumman
- COSPAR ID: 2019-071A
- SATCAT no.: 44701
- Mission duration: 136 days, 9 hours

Spacecraft properties
- Spacecraft: S.S. Alan Bean
- Spacecraft type: Enhanced Cygnus
- Manufacturer: Northrop Grumman; Thales Alenia Space

Start of mission
- Launch date: 2 November 2019, 13:59:47 UTC (9:59:47 am EST)
- Rocket: Antares 230+
- Launch site: MARS, Pad 0A

End of mission
- Disposal: Deorbited
- Decay date: 17 March 2020, 23:00 UTC

Orbital parameters
- Reference system: Geocentric orbit
- Regime: Low Earth orbit
- Inclination: 51.66°

Berthing at ISS
- Berthing port: Unity nadir
- RMS capture: 4 November 2019, 09:10 UTC
- Berthing date: 4 November 2019, 11:21 UTC
- Unberthing date: 31 January 2020, 13:10 UTC
- RMS release: 31 January 2020, 14:36 UTC
- Time berthed: 88 days, 3 hours, 15 minutes

Cargo
- Mass: 3,705 kg (8,168 lb)
- Pressurised: 3,586 kg (7,906 lb)
- Unpressurised: 119 kg (262 lb)
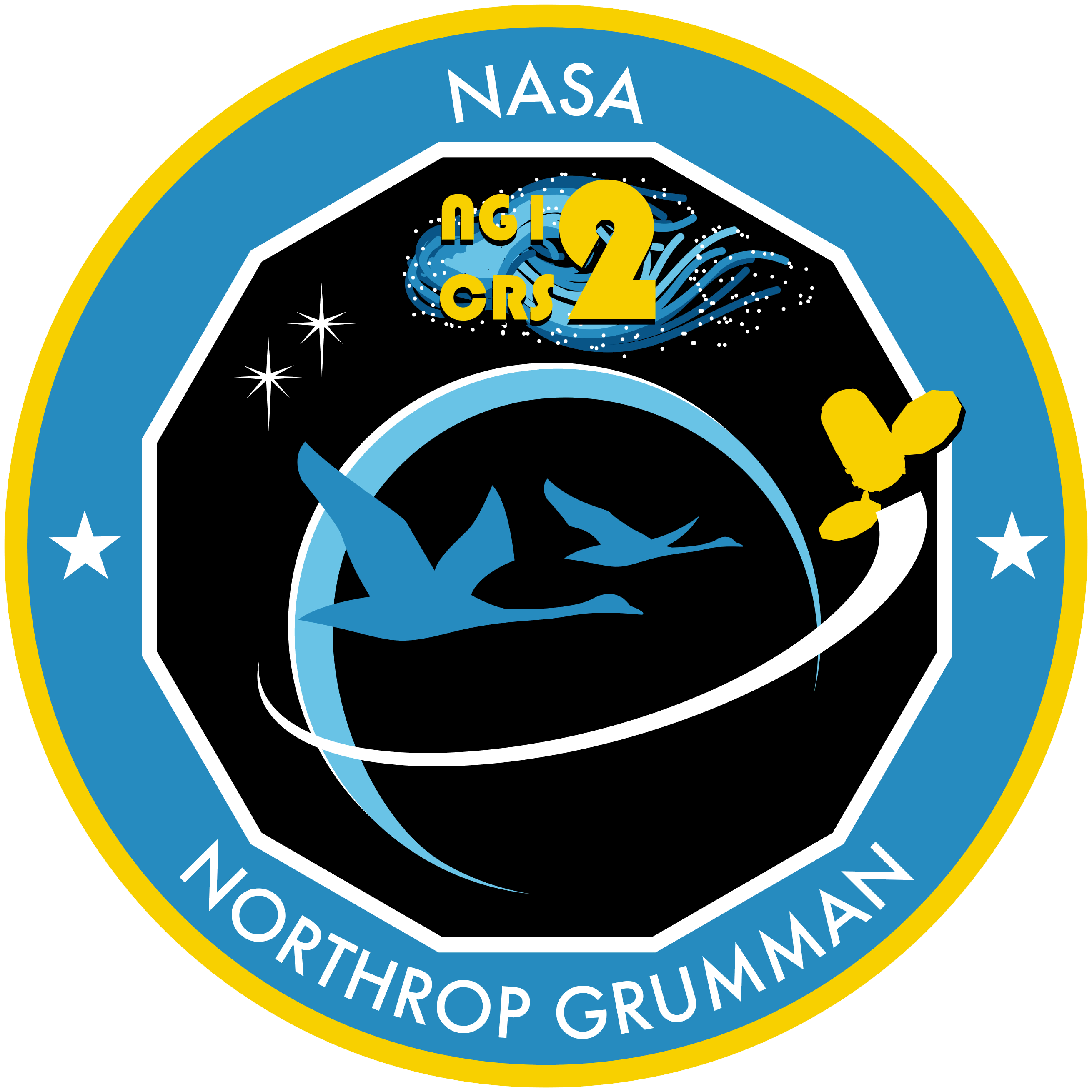
- NASA insignia Commercial Resupply Services Cygnus flights

NG-12, previously known as OA-12, was the thirteenth flight of the Northrop Grumman robotic resupply spacecraft Cygnus and its twelfth Commercial Resupply Services flight to the International Space Station (ISS) for NASA. The mission launched on 2 November 2019 at 13:59:47 UTC). This was the first launch of Cygnus under the Commercial Resupply Services 2 (CRS-2) contract.

Orbital ATK and NASA jointly developed a new space transportation system to provide commercial cargo resupply services to the International Space Station (ISS). Under the Commercial Orbital Transportation Services (COTS) program, then Orbital Sciences designed and built Antares, a medium-class launch vehicle; Cygnus, an advanced maneuvering spacecraft, and a Pressurized Cargo Module which is provided by Orbital's industrial partner Thales Alenia Space. Northrop Grumman purchased Orbital ATK in June 2018; its ATK division was renamed Northrop Grumman Innovation Systems.

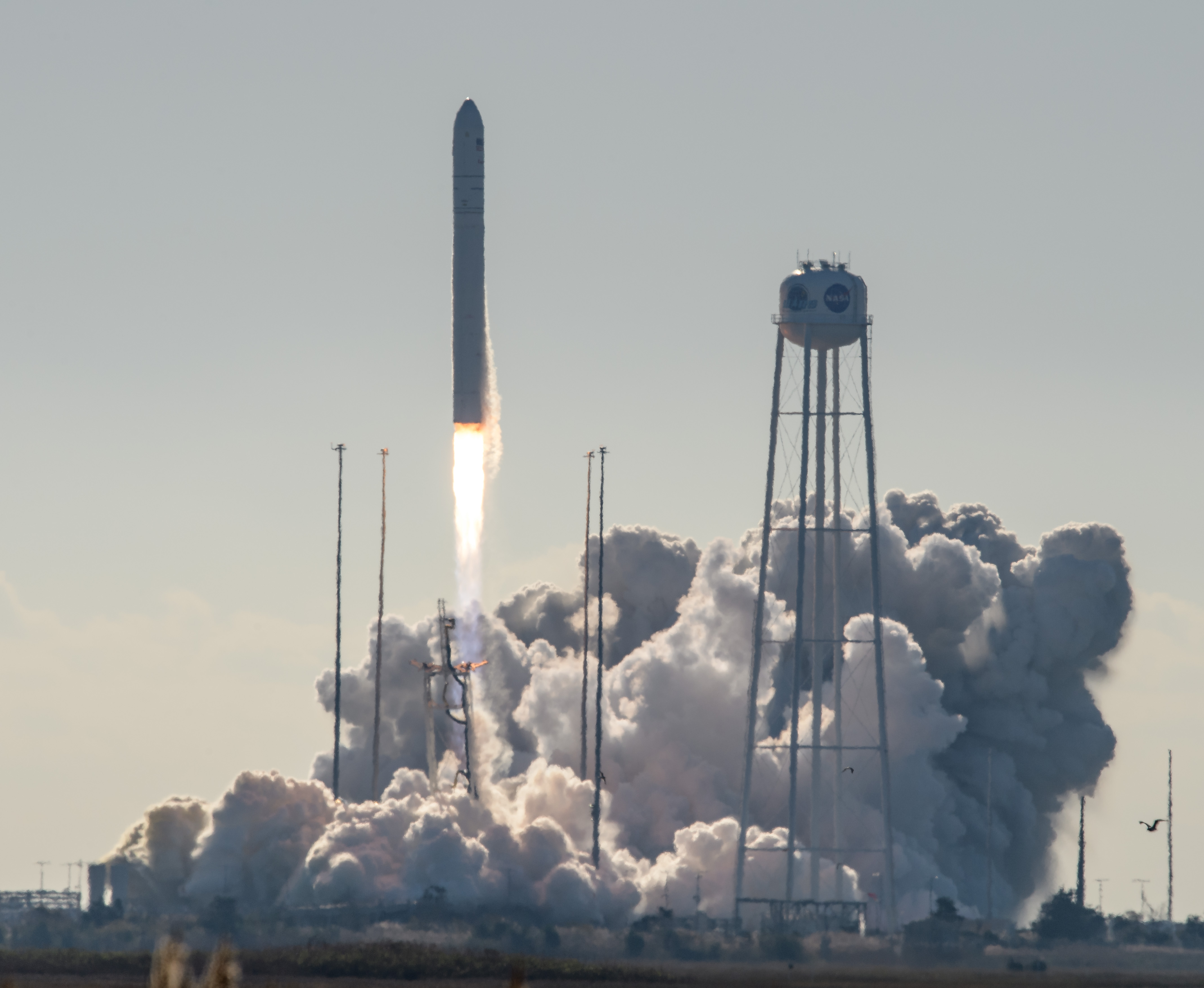
Antares 230+ launches the Cygnus NG-12 mission.

== History ==
Cygnus NG-12 was the first mission under the Commercial Resupply Services 2 contract and launched 2 November 2019 at 13:59:47 UTC.

== Spacecraft ==
Production and integration of Cygnus spacecraft is performed in Dulles, Virginia. The Cygnus service module is mated with the pressurized cargo module at the launch site, and mission operations are conducted from control centers at Dulles, Virginia and Houston, Texas. This is the ninth flight of the Enhanced-sized Cygnus PCM.

In 2019, the spacecraft was named the S.S. Alan Bean.

== Manifest ==
Total weight of cargo: 3,705 kg (8,168 lb), consisting of 3,705 kg (8,168 lb) in pressurized cargo and 119 kg (262 lb) in unpressurized cargo.

- Crew supplies: 680 kg (1,500 lb)
- Science investigations: 1,983 kg (4,372 lb)
- Spacewalk equipment: 107 kg (236 lb)
- Vehicle hardware: 756 kg (1,667 lb)
- Computer resources: 17 kg (37 lb)
- Russian hardware: 11 kg (24 lb)
- Northrop Grumman-related equipment: 35 kg (77 lb)

Among the cargo delivered was a special made oven for use in space, and some cookie dough. The crew of ISS attempt to use the device to bake chocolate chip cookies in space (a first time for this kind of space activity). The baking of cookies in space attracted some international media attention when the mission was arriving at the space station.

Another research-related item delivered is the AstroRad radiation protective vest, which astronauts will wear to determine the degree of flexibility and freedom of movements experienced by them while working with these vests. This feedback will be used to possibly improve the comfort and ergonomics of the radiation vests if needed. AstroRad is useful in significantly reducing the short-term deterministic effects such as acute radiation syndrome and the probability of stochastic effects such as cancer in long-term ex-LEO missions.

The Houston Methodist Institute, in collaboration with Lamborghini sent some carbon fiber reinforced polymers aboard the mission. The project seeks to leverage the harsh space environment to test the performance of five proprietary carbon fiber materials, including forged and 3D-printed carbon fiber composites, developed by Lamborghini for aerospace applications. The research team will assess the ability of the materials to withstand exposure to temperature fluctuations, radiation, and atomic oxygen.

Cygnus NG-12 tested the Cygnus External Payload Carrier which is used to deliver external payloads to the station or remove degraded ones. SOLAR and the SDS were the first payloads transferred to the spacecraft for disposal.

== Extension ==
Northrop Grumman's customer with a payload on the Cygnus (Lynk) sought extra time in orbit, a request that the Federal Communications Commission (FCC) approved on 3 March 2020. The FCC approval provided the potential to extend this testing until as late as 2 April 2020. "The extension of our license by the FCC allows Northrop Grumman to extend our NG-12 mission beyond our original completion date, enabling us to offer increased operational flexibility for our customers". Frank DeMauro, vice president and general manager of Tactical Space at Northrop Grumman, said in the statement. "The NG-12 spacecraft remains in excellent health as we carry out a few more weeks of in-orbit operations".

The spacecraft was deorbited at about 23:00 UTC on 17 March 2020.

== See also ==
- Uncrewed spaceflights to the International Space Station
