= INSAT-4A =

Communications satellite

INSAT 4A
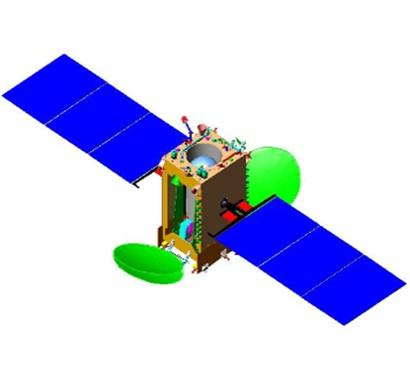
- INSAT-4A spacecraft in deployed configuration
- Mission type: Communications
- Operator: INSAT
- COSPAR ID: 2005-049A
- SATCAT no.: 28911
- Website: INSAT 4A
- Mission duration: Planned: 12 years Achieved: 13 years, 9 months, 29 days

Spacecraft properties
- Bus: I-3K
- Manufacturer: ISRO
- Launch mass: 3,081 kilograms (6,792 lb)
- Dry mass: 1,386 kilograms (3,056 lb)
- Dimensions: 2.8 x 1.7 x 2.0 m
- Power: 5,922 watts

Start of mission
- Launch date: 21 December 2005, 22:33 UTC
- Rocket: Ariane 5GS
- Launch site: Kourou ELA-3
- Contractor: Arianespace

End of mission
- Disposal: Moved to a graveyard orbit
- Deactivated: 21 October 2019

Orbital parameters
- Reference system: Geocentric
- Regime: Geostationary
- Slot: 83° East (0°N +83°E)
- Period: 24 hours

Transponders
- Band: 12 K_{u} band 12 C-band
- Bandwidth: 36 megahertz
- TWTA power: 140 & 63 watts
- EIRP: 51 & 38 dbW

INSAT-4A was the first one in the INSAT-4 Satellites series, providing services in the K_{u} and C band frequency bands. At the time of launch, it was the heaviest satellite India had produced. The K_{u} transponders cover the Indian main land and C-Band transponders cover an extended area. It has a dozen K_{u} transponders and another dozen of C-band transponders. This spacecraft was placed at 83°E along with INSAT-2E and INSAT-3B, by Ariane launch vehicle (ARIANE5-V169).

== Overview ==
INSAT-4A was a communication satellite intended for providing high quality television, telecommunication, broadcasting services and was the first satellite to be launched in the INSAT-4 series.

== Launch ==
INSAT-4A was launched by an Ariane 5, produced by Arianespace, on 21 Dec 2005 at 22.33 UTC from Kourou, French Guiana. It was placed into a Geosynchronous Transfer Orbit (GTO), 30 minutes after lift-off in 3-axis stabilized mode, with a perigee of 859 km and an apogee of 36,055 km. Its co-passenger on board was Meteosat-9 of EUMETSAT.

== Payload ==
- 12 K_{u} band transponders. It was being used by Tata Sky.
- 12 C-band transponders

== End Of Life and Replacement ==
The satellite was placed in the graveyard orbit on 21 October 2019 after almost 14 years in service. A replacement satellite GSAT-30 was launched on 21:05 UTC, 16 January 2020 aboard Ariane 5 VA251.
