= BSAT-3a =

Japanese satellite

- Mission type: Communication
- Operator: B-SAT
- COSPAR ID: 2007-036B
- SATCAT no.: 32019
- Website: B-SAT Satellite Fleet
- Mission duration: 13 years (planned)

Spacecraft properties
- Spacecraft: BSAT-3a
- Bus: A2100
- Manufacturer: Lockheed Martin
- Launch mass: 1980 kg
- Dry mass: 927 kg
- Dimensions: 3.8 by 1.9 by 1.9 metres (12.5 ft × 6.2 ft × 6.2 ft)
- Power: 2.8 kW

Start of mission
- Launch date: 14 August 2007, 23:44:07 UTC
- Rocket: Ariane 5 ECA (VA-177)
- Launch site: Centre Spatial Guyanais, ELA-3
- Contractor: Arianespace
- Entered service: 1 October 2007

Orbital parameters
- Reference system: Geocentric orbit
- Regime: Geostationary orbit
- Longitude: 110.0° East

Transponders
- Band: 8 (plus 4 spares) K_{u}-band
- Coverage area: Japan
- TWTA power: 130 watts

BSAT-3a, is a geostationary communications satellite operated by Broadcasting Satellite System Corporation (B-SAT) which was designed and manufactured by Lockheed Martin on the A2100 platform. It is stationed on the 110,0° East orbital slot with its companion BSAT-3b and BSAT-3c from where they provide redundant high definition direct television broadcasting across Japan.

== History ==
On 27 April 2005, Lockheed Martin announced that it had been granted by B-SAT an authorisation to proceed to the construction of its first third generation broadcasting satellite, BSAT-3a. On 18 May 2005, both companies announced the signature of the definitive contract for the satellite. It would be based on the A2100 platform, sport eight 130 watts K_{u}-band transponders (plus 4 spares), have a design life of 13 years and have a 1.8 kW power generation capability. It was expected launch in the second quarter of 2007 to be co-located at the 110.0° East orbital position. On 15 June 2005, Arianespace announced that it had been awarded the launch contract for BSAT-3a.

== Satellite description ==
BSAT-3a was designed and manufactured by Lockheed Martin on the A2100 satellite bus for B-SAT. It had a launch mass of 1,980 kilograms (4,370 lb), a dry mass of 927 kilograms (2,044 lb), and a 13-year design life. As most satellites based on the A2100 platform, it uses a 460 newtons (100 lb_{f}) LEROS-1C LAE for orbit raising.

It measured 3.8 by 1.9 by 1.9 metres (12.5 ft × 6.2 ft × 6.2 ft) when stowed for launch. Its dual wing solar panels can generate 2.8 kW of power at the end of its design life, and span 14.65 metres (48.1 ft) when fully deployed.

It has a single K_{u}-band payload with 8 active transponders plus four spares with a TWTA output power of 130 watts.

== Launch ==
On 19 June 2007, Lockheed announced that it was poised to deliver BSAT-3a on the third quarter of 2007, with another Japanese spacecraft, JCSAT-11. BSAT-3a was the sixth broadcasting satellite procured by B-SAT.

On 10 August 2007, Lockheed announced that BSAT-3a was mated to the launcher and ready for its ride to orbit. It launched at 23:44 UTC, on 14 August 2007 aboard an Ariane 5 ECA from Centre Spatial Guyanais ELA-3 launch pad. It rode on the lower berth under the SYLDA with Spaceway-3. The first signals from the satellite were received one hour later, at 00:46 UTC on 15 August 2007. It also marked the 33rd launch of the A2100 platform.

It was entered into service on 1 October 2007 after successfully passing the on-orbit deployment and checkout phase.
