= GSAT-18 =

Indian communications satellite

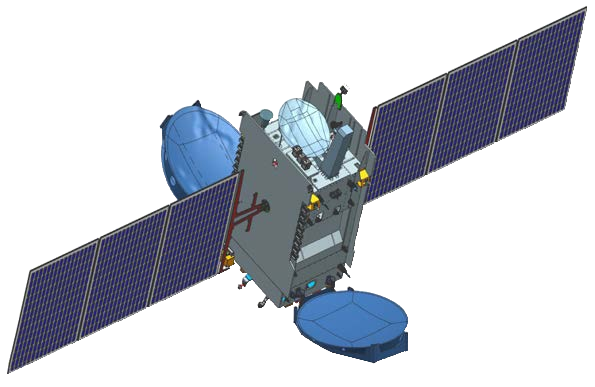
- Mission type: Communications
- Operator: INSAT
- COSPAR ID: 2016-060A
- SATCAT no.: 41793
- Website: GSAT-18
- Mission duration: Planned: 15 years Elapsed: 9 years, 11 months, 20 days

Spacecraft properties
- Bus: I-3K
- Manufacturer: ISRO Satellite Centre; Space Applications Centre
- Launch mass: 3,404 kg (7,505 lb)
- Dry mass: 1,480 kg (3,263 lb)
- Power: 6,474 watts

Start of mission
- Launch date: 5 October 2016, ≈20:30 UTC
- Rocket: Ariane 5 ECA, VA-231
- Launch site: Guiana Space Centre ELA-3
- Contractor: Arianespace

Orbital parameters
- Reference system: Geocentric
- Regime: Geostationary
- Longitude: 74° E
- Perigee altitude: 35,750 km (22,214 mi)
- Apogee altitude: 35,822 km (22,259 mi)
- Inclination: 0.0616°
- Epoch: 11 June 2017 01:46:00 UTC

Transponders
- Band: 24 × C band 12 × extended C band 12 × K_{u} band 2 × K_{u} beacon

GSAT-18 is an Indian communications satellite. Built by ISRO and operated by INSAT, it carries 24 C-band, 12 extended C-band, and 12 K_{u}-band transponders.As of 2025, 6 transponders in the spacecraft are kept in idle, as GSAT-14 covers their spectrum.they are expected to be online in early 2027.

The satellite was launched on 5 October 2016 at approximately 20:30 UTC aboard an Ariane 5 ECA rocket from the Guiana Space Centre in Kourou, French Guiana. The launch vehicle inserted the satellite into a geosynchronous transfer orbit, and once in service it will occupy the orbital slot at 74° East longitude. The total cost of the satellite and launch services was about US$153 million.

GSAT-18 was originally scheduled to launch on 12 July 2016 alongside Japan's Superbird-8 satellite, but a shipping mishap which damaged Superbird-8 forced a delay in the launch schedule. Arianespace later paired GSAT-18 with Australia's Sky Muster II for a 4 October 2016 launch. The launch was delayed 24 hours to 5 October due to excessively high crosswinds at the launch site.

== Orbit raising and station keeping ==
Orbit raising operations were made using an on-board LAM and chemical thrusters to place the satellite in the intended geostationary orbital slot.

Op #	Date/ Time (UTC)	LAM burn time	Height achieved		Inclination achieved	Orbital period	References
Op #	Date/ Time (UTC)	LAM burn time	Apogee	Perigee	Inclination achieved	Orbital period	References
1	6 October 2016; 10:16	6040.6 sec	35,802 km (22,246 mi)	14,843 km (9,223 mi)	1.325°	15 hrs, 36 mins	
2	8 October 2016; 05:59	-	35,840 km (22,270 mi)	32,518 km (20,206 mi)	0.129°	22 hrs, 34 mins	
3	9 October 2016; 04:51	256.17 sec	35,802 km (22,246 mi)	35,294 km (21,931 mi)	0.136°	23 hrs, 44 mins	
