= BSAT-2b =

Japanese communications satellite

- Mission type: Communication
- Operator: B-SAT
- COSPAR ID: 2001-029B
- SATCAT no.: 26864
- Mission duration: Launch failure

Spacecraft properties
- Spacecraft: BSAT-2b
- Bus: STAR-1
- Manufacturer: Orbital Sciences Corporation
- Launch mass: 1,317 kg (2,903 lb)
- Dry mass: 535 kg (1,179 lb)
- Dimensions: 3.76 m × 2.49 m × 2.03 m (12.3 ft × 8.2 ft × 6.7 ft)
- Power: 2.6 kW

Start of mission
- Launch date: 23:58, July 12, 2001 (UTC) (failure)
- Rocket: Ariane 5G V-142
- Launch site: Guiana Space Center ELA-3
- Contractor: Arianespace

End of mission
- Disposal: Decayed from wrong orbit
- Decay date: January 28, 2014

Transponders
- Band: 4 (plus 4 spares) K_{u} band
- TWTA power: 130 Watts

BSAT-2b, was a geostationary communications satellite ordered by B-SAT which was designed and manufactured by Orbital Sciences Corporation on the STAR-1 platform. It was designed to be stationed on the 110° East orbital slot along its companion BSAT-2a where it would provide redundant high definition direct television broadcasting across Japan.

But the Ariane 5G rocket had an anomaly during its July 12, 2001 launch. It left BSAT-2b stranded in an orbit too low for its propulsion system to compensate and the spacecraft was written off. BSAT ordered BSAT-2c immediately to replace it. It decayed and burned in the atmosphere on January 28, 2014.

== Satellite description ==
BSAT-2b was designed and manufactured by Orbital Sciences Corporation on the STAR-1 satellite bus for B-SAT. It had a launch mass of 1,317 kg (2,903 lb), a dry mass of 927 kg (2,044 lb), and a 10-year design life. As all four STAR-1 satellites, it had a solid rocket Star 30CBP apogee kick motor for orbit raising, plus 200 kg (440 lb) of propellant for its liquid propellant station keeping thrusters.

It measured 3.76 m × 2.49 m × 2.03 m (12.3 ft × 8.2 ft × 6.7 ft) when stowed for launch. Its dual wing solar panels can generate 2.6 kW of power at the beginning of its design life, and span 16.10 m (52.8 ft) when fully deployed.

It has a single K_{u} band payload with four active transponders plus four spares with a TWTA output power of 130 Watts.

== History ==
In March 1999, B-SAT ordered from Orbital Sciences Corporation two satellites based on the STAR-1 platform: BSAT-2a and BSAT-2b. This was the second order of the bus and the first since Orbital had acquired CTA Space Systems, the original developer.

BSAT-2b was launched aboard an Ariane 5G at 23:58 UTC, July 12, 2001, from Guiana Space Center ELA-3. It rode on the lower berth below Artemis. But the EPS upper stage had an anomaly and left the satellites on a 17,528 km × 592 km × 2.9° orbit, short of the planned 35,853 km × 858 km × 2.0°. While Artemis used its electric propulsion to make up for the difference. But BSAT-2b Star 30CBP apogee kick motor could not make up for the orbital energy short fall and was written off.

On January 28, 2014, BSAT-2b decayed from its orbit and burned in the atmosphere.
