= Star Bus =

Family of spacecraft buses

Artist impression of Optus D1, built on the Orbital Star Bus platform

Star Bus is a satellite bus family of Orbital ATK. It was originally developed by Thomas van der Heyden, co-founder of CTAI, and later sold to and manufactured by Orbital Sciences Corporation.

The Star Bus satellite platform is designed for various applications, including communications, remote sensing, and scientific missions. The highly configurable platform allows customization to meet specific mission requirements. In addition, it can support a wide range of payloads, including high-resolution imaging systems, microwave sensors, and advanced communication systems.

The Star Bus platform is designed with a modular architecture, allowing for easy integration of various subsystems and payloads. The bus provides power, communications, and data handling capabilities, while the loads provide mission-specific capabilities. The platform is designed to be highly reliable and has been used in various missions, including the Hubble Space Telescope and NASA's New Horizons mission to Pluto.

== Evolution of the Star Bus Platform ==
Since its initial development, the Star Bus platform has undergone continuous enhancements, expanding its capabilities for increasingly complex missions. Orbital ATK, now part of Northrop Grumman after its acquisition in 2018, has further refined the platform to support geostationary communications satellites, low Earth orbit (LEO) missions, and interplanetary exploration. These advancements include improvements in power generation, thermal management, and propulsion systems, making it one of the most versatile satellite platforms in the industry. The Star Bus family has been employed in both commercial and governmental projects, including the SES and Intelsat communications constellations.

== History ==
The Star Bus platform originated in the early 1990s when Thomas van der Heyden, co-founder of CTA Incorporated (CTAI), designed it for the Indonesian Cakrawarta direct broadcast satellite program. CTAI was acquired by Orbital Sciences Corporation in 1997, and the platform passed into Orbital's product line. Orbital Sciences merged with Alliant Techsystems in 2015 to form Orbital ATK, which was acquired by Northrop Grumman in 2018 and folded into Northrop Grumman Space Systems.

The first satellite program based on the Star Bus platform, developed by Thomas van der Heyden for the Indonesian Direct Broadcast program IndoVision, was IndoStar-1, which was launched in November 1997.

== Variants ==
Name	Mission type	Orbit	Payload capability	Mission life
RapidStar-1	Military/Reconnaissance	LEO	60 kg/75W	1–5 years
RapidStar-2	Military/Reconnaissance	LEO	200 kg/500W	1–5 years
LEOStar-2	Civil/Military	LEO	150 kg/400W	1–10 years
LEOStar-3	Civil/Military	LEO	3,000 kg/800W	1–10 years
GEOStar-1	Military/Reconnaissance	GEO	150 kg/200W	5–7 years
GEOStar-2	Communications	GEO	500 kg/5.5 kW	15–18 years
GEOStar-3	Communications	GEO	800 kg/8.0 kW	15–18 years
MicroStar-1	Constellation	LEO	15 kg/360W	1–3 years
ESPAStar-1	Military/Reconnaissance	LEO or GEO	250 kg/500W	1–5 years
ESPAStar-2	Military/Reconnaissance	LEO or GEO	1,080 kg/1.2 kW	1–5 years

== See also ==
- GEOStar-2
