= GSAT-30 =

Indian telecommunications satellite

GSAT 30
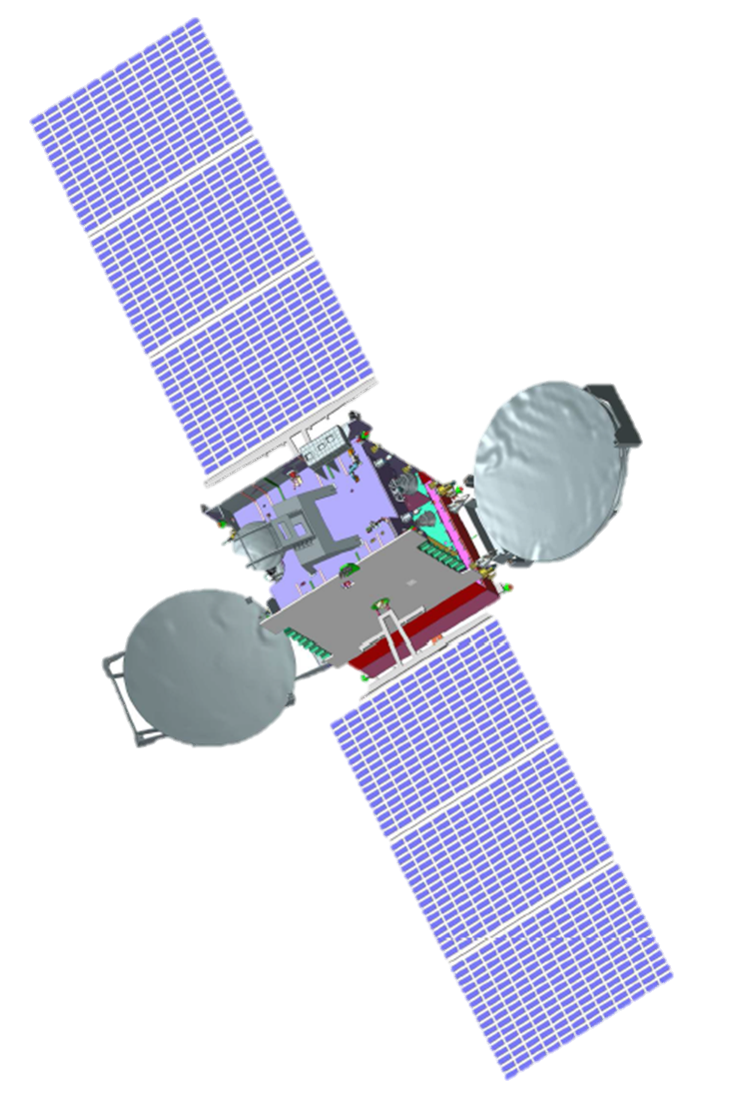
- Render of GSAT-30 spacecraft in deployed configuration
- Mission type: Communications
- Operator: ISRO
- COSPAR ID: 2020-005A
- SATCAT no.: 45026
- Mission duration: 15 years (planned); 5 years, 10 months, 19 days (elapsed)

Spacecraft properties
- Bus: I-3K
- Manufacturer: ISRO Satellite Centre; Space Applications Centre
- Launch mass: 3,357 kg (7,401 lb)
- Power: 6000 watts

Start of mission
- Launch date: 16 January 2020, 21:05 UTC
- Rocket: Ariance 5 ECA (VA-251)
- Launch site: Kourou, ELA-3
- Contractor: Arianespace

Orbital parameters
- Reference system: Geocentric orbit
- Regime: Geostationary orbit
- Longitude: 83.0° East

Transponders
- Band: 12 × C-band; 12 × K_{u}-band
- Coverage area: Asia, Australia

GSAT-30 is a telecommunications satellite developed by the Indian Space Research Organisation (ISRO).

== Mission ==
The satellite's main communication payload is 12 Ku band transponders for covering Indian mainland and islands and 12 C-band transponders for extended coverage over Asia and Australia. The satellite will act as a replacement for the defunct INSAT-4A. The satellite provides advanced telecommunication services to the Indian subcontinent. It is used for Very-small-aperture terminal (VSAT) networks, television uplinks, digital satellite news gathering, Direct-broadcast satellite (DTH) services and other communication systems. This is the 41st communication satellite launched by ISRO and the 24th launch of ISRO satellite by Arianespace.

== Satellite ==
The satellite is based on ISRO's I-3K bus. It was assembled by a consortium of mid-sized industries led by Alpha Design Technologies Ltd. at ISRO Satellite Integration and Test Establishment at Bengaluru.

== Launch ==
GSAT-30 satellite was launched aboard Ariane 5 launch vehicle (VA251) from French Guiana on 21:05 UTC, 16 January 2020 or 02:35 IST, 17 January 2020. After three orbit raising burns with cumulative duration of 2 hours 29 minutes, GSAT-30 acquired station at 81° East on 25 January 2020.

The launch of the GSAT-30 and GSAT-31 by Arianespace is expected to cost Rs 950 crore.
