= BSAT-2a =

Japanese communications satellite

- Mission type: Communication
- Operator: B-SAT
- COSPAR ID: 2001-011B
- SATCAT no.: 26720

Spacecraft properties
- Spacecraft: BSAT-2a
- Bus: STAR-1
- Manufacturer: Orbital Sciences Corporation
- Launch mass: 1,317 kg (2,903 lb)
- Dry mass: 535 kg (1,179 lb)
- Dimensions: 3.76 m × 2.49 m × 2.03 m (12.3 ft × 8.2 ft × 6.7 ft)
- Power: 2.6 kW

Start of mission
- Launch date: 22:51, March 8, 2001 (UTC)
- Rocket: Ariane 5G V-140
- Launch site: Guiana Space Center ELA-3
- Contractor: Arianespace
- Entered service: April 26, 2001

End of mission
- Disposal: Placed in a graveyard orbit
- Deactivated: January 2013

Orbital parameters
- Reference system: Geocentric
- Regime: Graveyard orbit
- Semi-major axis: 42,474 km
- Perigee altitude: 36,069.5 km
- Apogee altitude: 36,137.2 km
- Inclination: 3.4°
- Period: 1,451.9 minutes
- Epoch: 00:00:00 UTC 2016-09-07

Transponders
- Band: 4 (plus 4 spares) K_{u} band
- TWTA power: 130 Watts

BSAT-2a, was a geostationary communications satellite operated by B-SAT which was designed and manufactured by Orbital Sciences Corporation on the STAR-1 platform. It was stationed on the 110° East orbital slot along its companion BSAT-2c from where they provided redundant high definition direct television broadcasting across Japan.

== Satellite description ==
BSAT-2a was designed and manufactured by Orbital Sciences Corporation on the STAR-1 satellite bus for B-SAT. It had a launch mass of 1,317 kg (2,903 lb), a dry mass of 535 kg (1,179 lb), and a 10-year design life. As all four STAR-1 satellites, it had a solid rocket Star 30CBP apogee kick motor for orbit raising, plus 200 kg (440 lb) of propellant for its liquid propellant station keeping thrusters.

It measured 3.76 m × 2.49 m × 2.03 m (12.3 ft × 8.2 ft × 6.7 ft) when stowed for launch. Its dual wing solar panels can generate 2.6 kW of power at the beginning of its design life, and span 16.10 m (52.8 ft) when fully deployed.

It has a single K_{u} band payload with four active transponders plus four spares with a TWTA output power of 130 Watts.

== History ==
In March 1999, B-SAT ordered from Orbital Sciences Corporation two satellites based on the STAR-1 platform: BSAT-2a and BSAT-2b. This was the second order of the bus and the first since Orbital had acquired CTA Space Systems, the original developer.

BSAT-2a was launched aboard an Ariane 5G at 22:51 UTC, March 8, 2001, from Guiana Space Center ELA-3. It rode on the lower berth below Eurobird. On April 26, BSAT-2a was commissioned into service starting the broadcast of digital signals.

B-SAT ended the broadcast of analog television in July 2011. During January 2013, BSAT-2a was sent to a graveyard orbit and decommissioned.
