= BSAT-2c =

Japanese communications satellite

- Mission type: Communication
- Operator: B-SAT
- COSPAR ID: 2003-028A
- SATCAT no.: 27830

Spacecraft properties
- Spacecraft: BSAT-2c
- Bus: STAR-1
- Manufacturer: Orbital Sciences Corporation
- Launch mass: 1,275 kg (2,811 lb)
- Dry mass: 535 kg (1,179 lb)
- Dimensions: 3.7 m × 2.5 m × 2 m (12.1 ft × 8.2 ft × 6.6 ft)
- Power: 2.6 kW

Start of mission
- Launch date: 22:38, June 11, 2003 (UTC)
- Rocket: Ariane 5G V-161
- Launch site: Guiana Space Center ELA-3
- Contractor: Arianespace
- Entered service: July 15, 2003

End of mission
- Disposal: Placed in a graveyard orbit
- Deactivated: August 2013

Orbital parameters
- Reference system: Geocentric
- Regime: Graveyard orbit
- Semi-major axis: 42,467 km
- Perigee altitude: 36,065.2 km
- Apogee altitude: 36,128.7 km
- Inclination: 2.5°
- Period: 1,451.6 minutes
- Epoch: 00:00:00 UTC 2016-09-09

Transponders
- Band: 4 (plus 4 spares) K_{u} band
- TWTA power: 130 Watts

BSAT-2c, was a geostationary communications satellite operated by B-SAT and was designed and manufactured by Orbital Sciences Corporation on the STAR-1 platform. It was stationed on the 110° East orbital slot along its companion BSAT-2a from where they provided redundant high definition direct television broadcasting across Japan.

The original companion for BSAT-2a was BSAT-2b, but a launch failure during its launch during July 2001, meant that it was not possible to commission it into service. Thus, during October of the same year BSAT-2c was ordered and launched in June 2003. It was retired in August 2013.

== Satellite description ==
BSAT-2c was designed and manufactured by Orbital Sciences Corporation on the STAR-1 satellite bus for B-SAT. It had a launch mass of 1,275 kg (2,811 lb), a dry mass of 535 kg (1,179 lb), and a 10-year design life. As all four STAR-1 satellites, it had a solid rocket Star 30CBP apogee kick motor for orbit raising, plus 200 kg (440 lb) of propellant for its liquid propellant station keeping thrusters.

It measured 3.7 m × 2.5 m × 2 m (12.1 ft × 8.2 ft × 6.6 ft) when stowed for launch. Its dual wing solar panels could generate 2.6 kW of power at the beginning of its design life, and it span was 11.5 m (38 ft) when fully deployed.

It had a single K_{u} band payload with four active transponders plus four spares with a TWTA output power of 130 Watts.

== History ==
In March 1999, B-SAT ordered from Orbital Sciences Corporation two satellites based on the STAR-1 platform: BSAT-2a and BSAT-2b. This was the second order of the bus and the first since Orbital had acquired CTA Space Systems, the original developer. During 2001, BSAT-2a was successfully launched, but BSAT-2b was orbited into an incorrect orbit and was considered lost. In October of the same year, B-SAT contracted Orbital for a near copy replacement of the lost spacecraft, called BSAT-2c.

BSAT-2c was launched aboard an Ariane 5G at 22:38 UTC, June 11, 2003, from Guiana Space Center ELA-3. It rode on the lower berth below Optus C1. On July 15, BSAT-2c was commissioned into service starting the broadcast of digital signals.

B-SAT ended the broadcast of analog television in July 2011. During August 2013, BSAT-2c was sent to a graveyard orbit and decommissioned.
