= BSAT-3c =

Japanese satellite

BSAT-3c / JCSAT-110R
- Names: JCSAT-110R
- Mission type: Communication
- Operator: B-SAT / SKY Perfect JSAT
- COSPAR ID: 2011-041C
- SATCAT no.: 37776
- Website: JSAT Official Page
- Mission duration: 15 years (planned)

Spacecraft properties
- Spacecraft: BSAT-3c
- Bus: A2100
- Manufacturer: Lockheed Martin
- Launch mass: 2906 kg
- Dimensions: 5.3 by 2.0 by 1.9 metres (17.4 ft × 6.6 ft × 6.2 ft)
- Power: 7.5 kW

Start of mission
- Launch date: 6 August 2011, 22:52:00 UTC
- Rocket: Ariane 5 ECA
- Launch site: Centre Spatial Guyanais, ELA-3
- Contractor: Arianespace
- Entered service: 21 September 2011

Orbital parameters
- Reference system: Geocentric orbit
- Regime: Geostationary orbit
- Longitude: 110.0° East

Transponders
- Band: B-SAT: 12 K_{u}-band; JSAT: 12 × 36 MHz K_{u}-band
- Coverage area: Japan
- TWTA power: B-SAT: 120 watts

BSAT-3c, also known as JCSAT-110R, is a geostationary communications satellite operated by Broadcasting Satellite System Corporation (B-SAT) and SKY Perfect JSAT (JSAT) which was designed and manufactured by Lockheed Martin on the A2100 platform.

== History ==
On 18 September 2007, SKY Perfect JSAT (JSAT) announced an agreement with B-SAT to jointly procure a hybrid broadcast and communication satellite. Thanks to a decision of the Japanese government that effectively lifted a ban on such mixed satellites, both companies would share a spacecraft to act as backup of JCSAT-110 on the 110.0° East slot. Named BSAT-3c by B-SAT and JCSAT-110R by JSAT, it was to be launched in 2011, and it would be managed by B-SAT. On 19 September 2007, they closed a deal with Arianespace for a launch slot with an Ariane 5 for its launch.

On 15 December 2008, JSAT and B-SAT placed a joint order with Lockheed for another A2100-based satellite. Designated JCSAT-110R by JSAT and BSAT-3c by B-SAT, it was to be launched by an Ariane 5 in the second quarter of 2011. The satellite would have two 12 K_{u}-band payloads, one for each of the owners.

== Satellite description ==
The spacecraft was designed and manufactured by Lockheed Martin on the A2100 satellite bus for B-SAT and SKY Perfect JSAT (JSAT). It had a launch mass of 2,906 kilograms (6,407 lb) and a 15-year design life. As most satellites based on the A2100 platform, it uses a 460 newtons (100 lb_{f}) LEROS-1C LAE for orbit raising.

It measures 5.3 by 2.0 by 1.9 metres (17.4 ft × 6.6 ft × 6.2 ft) when stowed for launch. Its dual wing solar panels can generate 7.5 kW of power at the end of its design life, and span 18.9 metres (62 ft) when fully deployed.

It has two payloads, both in the K_{u}-band with 12 transponders each (a total of 24), each payload is dedicated to each of the owners. The B-SAT payload has 12 transponders with a TWTA output power of 120 watts. The JSAT payload has twelve 36 MHz transponders.

== Launch ==
Intended to launch on 1 August 2011, an anomaly on a valve of the EPC stage of the Ariane 5 ECA rocket, aborted the first launch attempt while the rocket was returned to its integration building for maintenance. On 6 August 2011, at 22:52 UTC, JCSAT-110R/BSAT-3c and its launch companion Astra 1N launched aboard the Ariane 5 ECA from Centre Spatial Guyanais ELA-3 launch pad. At 23:30 UTC, BSAT-3c, which was riding on the lower berth under the SYLDA adapter, separated from the upper stage and successfully finishing the launcher mission. The first signals from the satellite were received at 23:52 UTC, and the process of transferring to its definitive orbital position at 110.0° East and verifying its performance was started. It was introduced into operational service on 21 September 2011.

It was the last of the third generation of B-SAT three-satellite fleet, and the on-orbit spare for the JSAT fleet.
