= BSAT-4a =

Japanese communications satellite

- Mission type: Communication
- Operator: B-SAT
- COSPAR ID: 2017-059B
- SATCAT no.: 42951
- Website: (Japanese)
- Mission duration: 15 years (planned)

Spacecraft properties
- Spacecraft: BSAT-4a
- Spacecraft type: BSAT
- Bus: SSL 1300
- Manufacturer: Space Systems/Loral
- Launch mass: 3500 kg

Start of mission
- Launch date: 29 September 2017, 21:56 UTC
- Rocket: Ariane 5 ECA
- Launch site: Guiana Space Center ELA-3
- Contractor: Arianespace

Orbital parameters
- Reference system: Geocentric orbit
- Regime: Geostationary orbit
- Longitude: 110.0° East (Planned)

Transponders
- Band: 24 K_{u}-band
- Coverage area: Japan

BSAT-4a is a geostationary communications satellite ordered by Broadcasting Satellite System Corporation (BSAT) and designed and manufactured by SSL on the SSL 1300 platform, to be stationed on the 110.0° East orbital slot for direct television broadcasting of 4K and 8K Ultra HD resolutions. It was launched on 29 September 2017.

== Satellite description ==
BSAT-4a was designed and manufactured by SSL on the SSL 1300 satellite bus for BSAT. It has an estimated launch mass of 3,500 kilograms (7,700 lb) with a 15-year design life.

It has a single K_{u}-band payload with 24 transponders, and covers Japan with 4K and 8K Ultra HD television satellite service.

== History ==
On 18 June 2015, BSAT ordered the first of its fourth generation satellites from SSL, BSAT-4a. It was expected to be weight around 3,500 kilograms (7,700 lb), have 24 K_{u}-band transponders with a 15-year design life. It was launched on 29 September 2017. It was planned that 4K and 8K signals would be broadcast by summer 2020.

In September 2015, BSAT contracted Arianespace for an Ariane 5 ECA launch service,and received a preliminary license for broadcasting 4K and 8K Ultra HD.
