= Eutelsat 33C =

Communications satellite

Eutelsat 133 West A
- Names: Eurobird 1 (2001–2012); Eutelsat 28A (2012–2015); Eutelsat 33C (2015–?); Eutelsat 133 West A (?–)
- Mission type: Communications
- Operator: Eutelsat
- COSPAR ID: 2001-011A
- SATCAT no.: 26719
- Mission duration: 12 years

Spacecraft properties
- Bus: Spacebus 3000B2
- Manufacturer: Alcatel Space
- Launch mass: 2,950 kilograms (6,500 lb)
- BOL mass: 1,810 kilograms (3,990 lb)
- Power: 5,900 watts

Start of mission
- Launch date: 8 March 2001, 22:51 UTC
- Rocket: Ariane 5G V140
- Launch site: Kourou ELA-3
- Contractor: Arianespace

Orbital parameters
- Reference system: Geocentric
- Regime: Geostationary
- Longitude: 28.5° East (2001–2015); 33° East (2015–?); 133° West (?–)

Transponders
- Bandwidth: 12*33; 12*72
- TWTA power: 90 watts

Eutelsat 133 West A (formerly Eurobird 1, Eutelsat 28A, and Eutelsat 33C) is a Eutelsat operated Eurobird satellite, used primarily for digital television. It was launched in March 2001, and after a short period testing at 33°E, joined Eutelsat 2F4 at 28.5°E in the Clarke Belt, just within the range of satellite dishes pointed at SES' Astra 2 satellites at 28.2° east. It moved to 33° east and joined Eutelsat 33B in July 2015. Then it was moved to 133° west.

== Operations ==
The satellite has three beams. A fixed beam covers almost all of Europe as well as north-western Africa. There are also two steerable beams - the first, "S1", co-focused with the fixed beam but with a Europe-only footprint, and a second, "S2", aimed to central Europe. This beam features many transponders with low symbol rates, used for satellite news gathering.

It features 24 active transponders and 12 backup transponders, all K_{u} band. 12 of its transponders are significantly wider (72 MHz bandwidth) than traditional broadcast satellites, and are reconfigurable into multiple "virtual" transponders. Each transponder is fixed only in its polarity, and many are carrying at least two, and up to 6 virtual transponders.

== History ==
Once stationed at 28.5°E, the satellite was promoted as providing satellite coverage for all of Europe, and featured both analogue and digital television and radio services serving Austria, the Czech Republic, Slovakia and other countries. Many of the services it carried had previously been on Kopernikus 2 which had operated at 28.5°E since 1990. These stations slowly started to leave, mostly due to viewers/listeners in those target audiences moving to more traditional orbital positions - 19.2°E for Austria, and the relatively new 23.5°E for Czechia and Slovakia.

On 1 March 2012 Eutelsat renamed Eurobird 1 to Eutelsat 28A.

In August 2012 it was confirmed that, after some loss of power events on Eutelsat 28A, Eutelsat 48B would be redeployed to the orbital position of 28.5 degrees East to ensure continuity of service.

In January 2014 SES and Eutelsat agreed that SES would run the whole spectrum at the 28.5°E slot. Eutelsat leases eight transponders and commercializes 12 transponders from the Astra 2 fleet. The last active Eutelsat 28A transponders transferred to Astra 2E on 29 June 2015. It has been redeployed at 33° east and renamed into Eutelsat 33C on 3 July 2015. It was redeployed at 133° west and renamed Eutelsat 133 West A.

== See also ==
- Astra 28.2°E
- List of satellites in geosynchronous orbit
- Eutelsat satellite operator
- Astra satellite family
