= IndoStar-1 =

Cakrawarta-1 (IndoStar-1)
- Mission type: Communications
- Operator: Media Citra Indostar
- COSPAR ID: 1997-071B
- SATCAT no.: 25050
- Mission duration: 7 years (planned); 7 years (expected); 11 years (achieved)

Spacecraft properties
- Bus: STAR-1
- Manufacturer: Orbital Sciences Corporation

Start of mission
- Launch date: 12 November 1997, 21:48 UTC
- Rocket: Ariane 44L H10-3 (V102)
- Launch site: Kourou ELA-2
- Contractor: Arianespace

End of mission
- Disposal: Decommissioned
- Deactivated: Mid 2009

Orbital parameters
- Reference system: Geocentric
- Regime: Geostationary

Transponders
- Band: S-band (5 active)
- Coverage area: Indonesia and parts of Southeast Asia

IndoStar-1, also known as Cakrawarta-1, was a communication satellite that was launched the evening of November 12, 1997 at 21:48 GMT aboard an Ariane 44L-3 rocket from Kourou, French Guiana. As the first direct broadcasting satellite (DBS) in Asia, IndoStar-1 would initiate a new communication service for Indonesian society such as direct-to-home television.

== Design ==
The IndoStar-1 geostationary broadcast satellite (the first STAR-1 spacecraft bus) and the Turn-Key Indovision Direct To Home (DTH) program was developed by Thomas van der Heyden. The satellite was built by a team of engineers at the US company Defense Systems Inc. (DSI), which had up until the IndoStar program (later renamed Cakrawarta by the then president of Indonesia, Suharto), focused on Low Earth Orbit (LEO) satellites for the US government, DARPA and NASA.

Under the contract DSI together with its sister company International Technologies Inc. (ITI) constructed the Indostar-1 satellite program for on-orbit turn-key delivery for the Indonesian television broadcasting company PT Media Citra Indostar (MCI). The Turn-Key, End-to-End contract, which included; Launch, Tracking Telemetry & Control Station, Up-Link Station for 60 MPEG television channels, Integrated Receiver Decoder (IRD) design, ITU regulatory filings, insurance, and spacecraft - was the first fully turn key contract in the commercial satellite industry.

In 1995 DSI was sold to Computer Technology Associates (CTA) which was sold two years later to Orbital Sciences Corporation (later Orbital ATK, now Northrop Grumman Innovation Systems) during the final stages of the Indostar-1 satellite integration in early 1997. The Indostar-1 satellite design was developed from scratch by Thomas van der Heyden and Dr. George Sebestyen founder of DSI, became the first GEO LightSat, their STAR Bus platform.

The Cakrawarta satellite was successfully launched into the geostationary orbital slot located at 107.7 East Longitude above Indonesia by the Ariane 44L launch vehicle on November 12, 1997, co-manifested with the Sirius-2 satellite.

IndoStar-1 was the world's first commercial communications satellite to use S-band frequencies for broadcast (pioneered by van der Heyden), which efficiently penetrate the atmosphere and provide high-quality transmissions to small-diameter 80 cm antennas in regions that experience heavy rainfall such as Indonesia. A similar Ku- or C-band reception performance requires greater transmission power or much larger dish to penetrate the moist atmosphere.

Due to a failed power regulator, two of the satellite's five transponders could not be used at 100% output whenever the satellite was eclipsed by the Earth. During these periods, only 80 percent of the required power was available. The spacecraft, with a design life of seven years, operated successfully for 11 years, providing 60 channels of MPEG-2 digital satellite television to the 235 million people of Indonesia.

On Saturday, May 16, 2009, Indovision launched the replacement for the Cakrawarta-1 (IndoStar-1) satellite, Indostar-2 (now SES-7) from the Baikonur Cosmodrome, Kazakhstan. It became operational in July 2009 and IndoStar-1 was subsequently decommissioned.

== Mission ==
IndoStar-1 was managed and operated by PT Media Citra Indostar (MCI), providing a direct broadcast signal by high quality digital transmission. Operationally, IndoStar-1 satellite was used for commercial services by cable television companies to relay international and local programs throughout Indonesia. Indovision used this satellite before switching to IndoStar-2.

== Description of IndoStar-1 Satellite ==
- Status: Satellite was launched via Ariane 44L-3 on November 12, 1997
- Destination: Geosynchronous Orbit @ 107E
- Operator: PT MediaCitra Indostar [MCI], Jakarta
- Performance Launch mass: 1,350 kg
- Class: Communications
- Mission: Provide direct broadcast television to Indonesia (high quality digital transmission, approximately 50 television channels)
- Mission life: 7 years with fuel for 12 years
- Designed by: Thomas van der Heyden
- Manufacturer: Defense Systems Inc. (later Orbital ATK, now Northrop Grumman Innovation Systems)

== See also ==
- 1997 in spaceflight
