= ELA-3 =

Launch pad at Kourou Space Centre, French Guiana

Ensemble de Lancement Ariane 3 Ariane Launch Complex 3
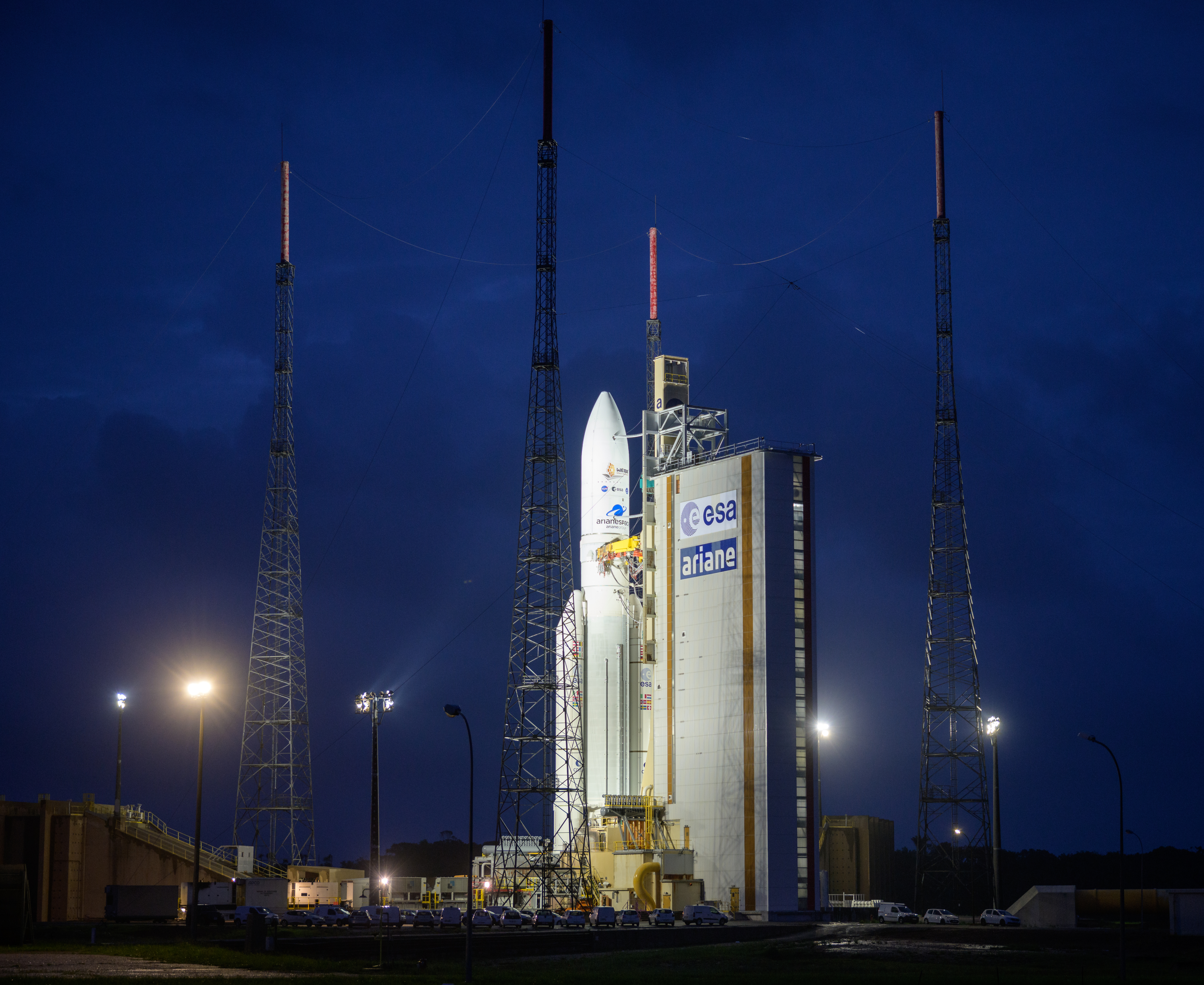
- ELA-3 before the launch of the James Webb Space Telescope
- Interactive map of Ensemble de Lancement Ariane 3 Ariane Launch Complex 3
- Launch site: Guiana Space Centre
- Location: 5.239°N 52.768°W
- Time zone: UTC−03 (GFT)
- Short name: ELA-3
- Operator: Avio
- Total launches: 117
Launch history
- Status: Inactive
- First launch: 4 June 1996; Ariane 5 G (CLUSTER)
- Last launch: 5 July 2023; Ariane 5 ECA (Syracuse 4B & Heinrich Hertz)
- Associated rockets: Future: Vega E Retired: Ariane 5

Launch pads at the Guiana Space Centre
Active pad
Inactive tenanted pad
Inactive untenanted pad
1 ELFS
2 ELM
3 ELV
4 ELA-2
5 ELA-3
6 ELA-4
7 ELS

ELA-3 (French: Ensemble de Lancement Ariane 3, lit. 'Ariane Launch Complex 3') is a launch complex at the Guiana Space Centre in French Guiana. The complex was first used in June 1996 in support of the now retired Ariane 5 rocket. It is currently being refurbished to support Vega E launches. The complex is 21 square kilometres (8.1 sq mi) in size.

== Launch history ==
=== Launch graph ===
- Ariane 5
- Vega-E

=== Launch chart ===
No.	Date	Time (UTC)	Launch vehicle	Configuration	Payload	Result	Remarks
1	4 June 1996	12:34	Ariane 5	Ariane 5 G	Cluster	Failure	Maiden flight of Ariane 5 and first launch from ELA-3. Software error stemming from Ariane 4 legacy code caused vehicle to veer off course and disintegrate 37 seconds after launch.
2	30 October 1997	13:43	Ariane 5	Ariane 5 G	MaqSat-H, TEAMSAT, MaqSat-B, and YES	Partial failure	First Ariane 5 flight to reach orbit. Upper stage underperformance led to payloads being placed in lower than planned orbit.
3	21 October 1998	16:37	Ariane 5	Ariane 5 G	MaqSat 3 and ARD	Success	First fully successful Ariane 5 launch. Contained ARD as a rideshare, designed to test reentry.
4	10 December 1999	14:32	Ariane 5	Ariane 5 G	XMM-Newton	Success	Part of Horizon 2000 program, a space telescope designed to perform x-ray astronomy.
5	21 March 2000	23:28	Ariane 5	Ariane 5 G	INSAT-3B and AsiaStar	Success	
6	14 September 2000	22:54	Ariane 5	Ariane 5 G	Astra 2B and GE-7	Success	
7	16 November 2000	01:07	Ariane 5	Ariane 5 G	PAS-1R, Amsat P3D, STRV 1C and STRV 1D	Success	
8	20 December 2000	00:26	Ariane 5	Ariane 5 G	Astra 2D, GE-8 and LDREX	Success	
9	8 March 2001	22:51	Ariane 5	Ariane 5 G	Eutelsat 28A and BSAT-2a	Success	
10	12 July 2001	22:58	Ariane 5	Ariane 5 G	Artemis and BSAT-2b	Partial failure	Upper stage underperformance led to payloads being placed into useless orbits. Artemis successfully recovered, BSAT-2b lost.
11	1 March 2002	01:07	Ariane 5	Ariane 5 G	Envisat	Success	Earth observation satellite designed to succeed the two European Remote-Sensing Satellites. Largest civilian observation satellite launched.
12	5 July 2002	23:22	Ariane 5	Ariane 5 G	Stellat 5 and N-Star c	Success	
13	28 August 2002	22:45	Ariane 5	Ariane 5 G	Atlantic Bird 1 and Meteosat 8	Success	
14	11 December 2002	22:22	Ariane 5	Ariane 5 ECA	Hot Bird 7 and Stentor	Failure	First stage engine failure led to vehicle's destruction by way of range safety.
15	9 April 2003	22:52	Ariane 5	Ariane 5 G	INSAT-3A and Galaxy 12	Success	
16	11 June 2003	22:38	Ariane 5	Ariane 5 G	Optus and Defence C1 and BSAT-2c	Success	
17	27 September 2003	23:14	Ariane 5	Ariane 5 G	INSAT-3E, eBird 1 and SMART-1	Success	
18	2 March 2004	07:17	Ariane 5	Ariane 5 G+	Rosetta	Success	Part of the Horizon 2000 program, designed to explore comet 67P/Churyumov–Gerasimenko. First spacecraft to orbit (and with Philae, first to land on) a comet, and first non-NASA spacecraft to reach the Outer Solar System. First Ariane 5 launch into heliocentric orbit.
19	18 July 2004	00:44	Ariane 5	Ariane 5 G+	Anik F2	Success	
20	18 December 2004	16:26	Ariane 5	Ariane 5 G+	Helios 2A, Essaim 1, 2, 3, 4, PARASOL and Nanosat 01	Success	
21	12 February 2005	21:03	Ariane 5	Ariane 5 ECA	XTAR-EUR, Maqsat-B2 and Sloshsat	Success	
22	11 August 2005	08:20	Ariane 5	Ariane 5 GS	Thaicom 4	Success	
23	13 October 2005	22:32	Ariane 5	Ariane 5 GS	Syracuse 3A and Galaxy 15	Success	
24	16 November 2005	23:46	Ariane 5	Ariane 5 ECA	Spaceway F2 and TELKOM-2	Success	
25	21 December 2005	22:33	Ariane 5	Ariane 5 GS	INSAT-4A and Meteosat 9	Success	
26	11 March 2006	22:32	Ariane 5	Ariane 5 ECA	Spainsat and Hot Bird 7A	Success	
27	27 May 2006	21:09	Ariane 5	Ariane 5 ECA	Satmex 6 and Thaicom 5	Success	
28	11 August 2006	22:15	Ariane 5	Ariane 5 ECA	JCSAT-10 and Syracuse 3B	Success	
29	13 October 2006	20:56	Ariane 5	Ariane 5 ECA	DirecTV-9S, Optus D1 and LDREX-2	Success	
30	8 December 2006	22:08	Ariane 5	Ariane 5 ECA	WildBlue 1 and AMC-18	Success	
31	11 March 2007	22:03	Ariane 5	Ariane 5 ECA	Skynet 5A and INSAT-4B	Success	
32	4 May 2007	22:29	Ariane 5	Ariane 5 ECA	Astra 1L and Galaxy 17	Success	
33	14 August 2007	23:44	Ariane 5	Ariane 5 ECA	Spaceway-3 and BSAT-3A	Success	
34	5 October 2007	22:02	Ariane 5	Ariane 5 GS	Intelsat 11 and Optus D2	Success	
35	14 November 2007	22:06	Ariane 5	Ariane 5 ECA	Skynet 5B and Star One C1	Success	
36	21 December 2007	21:41	Ariane 5	Ariane 5 GS	RASCOM-QAF 1 and Horizons-2	Success	
37	9 March 2008	04:03	Ariane 5	Ariane 5 ES	ATV-1 "Jules Verne"	Success	First flight of the Automated Transfer Vehicle, going to the International Space Station. Made Korou the third launch site (after Baikonur and Cape Canaveral/KSC) to launch a payload to the ISS.
38	18 April 2008	22:17	Ariane 5	Ariane 5 ECA	Star One C2 and Vinasat-1	Success	
39	12 June 2008	22:05	Ariane 5	Ariane 5 ECA	Turksat 3A and Skynet 5C	Success	
40	7 July 2008	21:47	Ariane 5	Ariane 5 ECA	Badr-6 and ProtoStar I	Success	
41	14 August 2008	20:44	Ariane 5	Ariane 5 ECA	AMC-21 and Superbird 7	Success	
42	20 December 2008	22:35	Ariane 5	Ariane 5 ECA	Eutelsat W2M and Hot Bird 9	Success	
43	12 February 2009	22:09	Ariane 5	Ariane 5 ECA	Hot Bird 10, NSS-9, Spirale A, and Spirale B	Success	
44	14 May 2009	13:12	Ariane 5	Ariane 5 ECA	Herschel Space Observatory and Planck	Success	Both part of the Horizon 2000 program, both space telescopes. Herschel designed to perform infrared astronomy, Planck designed to measure the cosmic microwave background.
45	1 July 2009	19:52	Ariane 5	Ariane 5 ECA	TerreStar-1	Success	
46	21 August 2009	22:09	Ariane 5	Ariane 5 ECA	JCSAT-12 and Optus D3	Success	
47	1 October 2009	21:59	Ariane 5	Ariane 5 ECA	Amazonas 2 and COMSATBw-1	Success	
48	29 October 2009	20:00	Ariane 5	Ariane 5 ECA	NSS-12 and Thor 6	Success	
49	18 December 2009	16:26	Ariane 5	Ariane 5 GS	Helios 2B	Success	
50	21 May 2010	22:01	Ariane 5	Ariane 5 ECA	Astra 3B and COMSATBw-2	Success	
51	16 June 2010	21:41	Ariane 5	Ariane 5 ECA	Arabsat-5A and COMS-1	Success	
52	4 August 2010	20:59	Ariane 5	Ariane 5 ECA	Nilesat 201 and RASCOM-QAF 1R	Success	
53	28 October 2010	21:51	Ariane 5	Ariane 5 ECA	Eutelsat W3B and BSAT-3b	Success	
54	26 November 2010	18:39	Ariane 5	Ariane 5 ECA	Intelsat 17 and HYLAS 1	Success	
55	29 December 2010	21:27	Ariane 5	Ariane 5 ECA	Koreasat 6 and HispaSat-1E	Success	
56	16 February 2011	21:50	Ariane 5	Ariane 5 ES	ATV-2 "Johannes Kepler"	Success	ISS resupply flight.
57	22 April 2011	21:37	Ariane 5	Ariane 5 ECA	Yahsat 1A and Intelsat New Dawn	Success	
58	20 May 2011	20:38	Ariane 5	Ariane 5 ECA	ST-2 and GSAT-8	Success	
59	6 August 2011	22:52	Ariane 5	Ariane 5 ECA	Astra 1N and BSAT 3c	Success	
60	21 September 2011	21:38	Ariane 5	Ariane 5 ECA	Arabsat-5C and SES-2	Success	
61	23 March 2012	04:34	Ariane 5	Ariane 5 ES	ATV-3 "Edoardo Amaldi"	Success	ISS resupply flight.
62	15 May 2012	22:13	Ariane 5	Ariane 5 ECA	JCSAT-13 and Vinasat-2	Success	
63	5 July 2012	21:36	Ariane 5	Ariane 5 ECA	EchoStar XVII and MSG-3	Success	
64	2 August 2012	20:54	Ariane 5	Ariane 5 ECA	Intelsat 20 and HYLAS 2	Success	
65	28 September 2012	21:18	Ariane 5	Ariane 5 ECA	Astra 2F and GSAT-10	Success	
66	10 November 2012	21:05	Ariane 5	Ariane 5 ECA	Eutelsat 21B and Star One C3	Success	
67	19 December 2012	21:49	Ariane 5	Ariane 5 ECA	Skynet 5D and MEXSAT-3	Success	
68	7 February 2013	21:36	Ariane 5	Ariane 5 ECA	Amazonas-3 and Azerspace-1/Africasat-1a	Success	
69	5 June 2013	21:52	Ariane 5	Ariane 5 ES	ATV-4 "Albert Einstein"	Success	ISS resupply flight.
70	25 July 2013	19:54	Ariane 5	Ariane 5 ECA	Alphasat I-XL and INSAT-3D	Success	
71	29 August 2013	20:30	Ariane 5	Ariane 5 ECA	Eutelsat 25B / Es'hail 1 and GSAT-7	Success	
72	6 February 2014	21:30	Ariane 5	Ariane 5 ECA	ABS-2 and Athena-Fidus	Success	
73	22 March 2014	22:04	Ariane 5	Ariane 5 ECA	Astra 5B and Amazonas 4A	Success	
74	29 July 2014	23:47	Ariane 5	Ariane 5 ES	ATV-5 "Georges Lemaître"	Success	ISS resupply flight. Final launch of the Automated Transfer Vehicle.
75	11 September 2014	22:05	Ariane 5	Ariane 5 ECA	MEASAT 3b and Optus 10	Success	
76	16 October 2014	21:43	Ariane 5	Ariane 5 ECA	Intelsat 30 and ARSAT-1	Success	
77	6 December 2014	20:40	Ariane 5	Ariane 5 ECA	DirecTV-14 and GSAT-16	Success	
78	26 April 2015	20:00	Ariane 5	Ariane 5 ECA	Thor 7 and SICRAL-2	Success	
79	27 May 2015	21:16	Ariane 5	Ariane 5 ECA	DirecTV-15 and Sky Mexico 1	Success	
80	15 July 2015	21:42	Ariane 5	Ariane 5 ECA	Star One C4 and MSG-4	Success	
81	20 August 2015	20:34	Ariane 5	Ariane 5 ECA	Eutelsat 8 West B and Intelsat 34	Success	
82	30 September 2015	20:30	Ariane 5	Ariane 5 ECA	NBN Co 1A and ARSAT-2	Success	
83	10 November 2015	21:34	Ariane 5	Ariane 5 ECA	Arabsat-6B and GSAT-15	Success	
84	27 January 2016	23:20	Ariane 5	Ariane 5 ECA	Intelsat 29e	Success	
85	9 March 2016	05:20	Ariane 5	Ariane 5 ECA	Eutelsat 65 West A	Success	
86	18 June 2016	21:38	Ariane 5	Ariane 5 ECA	EchoStar 18 and BRIsat	Success	
87	24 August 2016	22:16	Ariane 5	Ariane 5 ECA	Intelsat 33e and Intelsat 36	Success	
88	5 October 2016	20:30	Ariane 5	Ariane 5 ECA	Sky Muster II and GSAT-18	Success	
89	17 November 2016	10:07	Ariane 5	Ariane 5 ES	Galileo FOC M6	Success	Part of the Galileo satellite navigation system. First Galileo launch on Ariane 5 and from a launch vehicle besides Soyuz.
90	21 December 2016	17:30	Ariane 5	Ariane 5 ECA	Star One D1 and JCSAT-15	Success	
91	14 February 2017	18:39	Ariane 5	Ariane 5 ECA	Intelsat 32e / SkyBrasil-1 and Telkom 3S	Success	
92	4 May 2017	21:50	Ariane 5	Ariane 5 ECA	Koreasat 7 and SGDC-1	Success	
93	1 June 2017	23:45	Ariane 5	Ariane 5 ECA	ViaSat-2 and Eutelsat 172B	Success	
94	28 June 2017	21:15	Ariane 5	Ariane 5 ECA	EuropaSat / Hellas Sat 3 and GSAT-17	Success	
95	29 September 2017	21:56	Ariane 5	Ariane 5 ECA	Intelsat 37e, BSAT-4a	Success	
96	12 December 2017	18:36	Ariane 5	Ariane 5 ES	Galileo FOC M7	Success	Part of the Galileo satellite navigation system.
97	25 January 2018	22:20	Ariane 5	Ariane 5 ECA	SES-14 (with GOLD) and Al Yah 3	Partial failure	Part of the Explorers program for GOLD, designed to study the effects of space weather on Earth's atmosphere. First dedicated NASA mission to launch from Korou. Azimuth error led to vehicle heading off course and losing telemetry. SES-14/GOLD recovered without affecting mission, Al Yah 3 recovered at cost of significant reduction to lifespan.
98	5 April 2018	21:34	Ariane 5	Ariane 5 ECA	Superbird-8 / DSN-1 and HYLAS-4	Success	
99	25 July 2018	11:25	Ariane 5	Ariane 5 ES	Galileo FOC M8	Success	Part of the Galileo satellite navigation system.
100	25 September 2018	22:38	Ariane 5	Ariane 5 ECA	Horizons-3e and Azerspace-2 / Intelsat 38	Success	
101	20 October 2018	01:45	Ariane 5	Ariane 5 ECA	BepiColombo	Success	Part of the Horizon 2000 Plus program, designed to explore Mercury and study its magnetic field, magnetosphere, and composition. Joint mission between ESA and JAXA. First non-NASA spacecraft to visit the planet.
102	4 December 2018	20:37	Ariane 5	Ariane 5 ECA	GSAT-11 and GEO-KOMPSAT 2A	Success	
103	5 February 2019	21:01	Ariane 5	Ariane 5 ECA	GSAT-31 and Hellas Sat 4 / SaudiGeoSat 1	Success	
104	20 June 2019	21:43	Ariane 5	Ariane 5 ECA	DirecTV-16 and Eutelsat 7C	Success	
105	6 August 2019	19:30	Ariane 5	Ariane 5 ECA	EDRS-C/HYLAS-3 and Intelsat 39	Success	
106	26 November 2019	21:23	Ariane 5	Ariane 5 ECA	Inmarsat-5 F5 and TIBA-1	Success	
107	16 January 2020	21:05	Ariane 5	Ariane 5 ECA	Eutelsat Konnect and GSAT-30	Success	
108	18 February 2020	22:18	Ariane 5	Ariane 5 ECA	JCSAT-17 and GEO-KOMPSAT-2B	Success	
109	15 August 2020	22:04	Ariane 5	Ariane 5 ECA	BSAT-4b, Galaxy 30, MEV-2	Success	
110	30 July 2021	21:00	Ariane 5	Ariane 5 ECA	Eutelsat Quantum and Star One D2	Success	
111	21 October 2021	02:10	Ariane 5	Ariane 5 ECA	SES-17 and Syracuse 4A	Success	
112	25 December 2021	12:20	Ariane 5	Ariane 5 ECA	James Webb Space Telescope	Success	Part of the Large Strategic Science Missions, a space telescope aimed to perform visible light astronomy and infrared astronomy. Joint mission between NASA, ESA, and the CSA. Designed to act as a successor to the Hubble Space Telescope and the Spitzer Space Telescope.
113	23 June 2022	21:50	Ariane 5	Ariane 5 ECA	MEASAT-3d and GSAT-24	Success	
114	7 September 2022	21:45	Ariane 5	Ariane 5 ECA	Eutelsat Konnect VHTS	Success	
115	23 December 2022	20:30	Ariane 5	Ariane 5 ECA	Galaxy 35 & 36 and MTG-I1	Success	
116	14 April 2023	12:14	Ariane 5	Ariane 5 ECA	Jupiter Icy Moons Explorer	Success	Part of the Cosmic Vision program, designed to explore Jupiter and its moons such as Europa, Ganymede, and Callisto. Complements NASA's Europa Clipper. Slated to be first Non-NASA spacecraft to visit an outer Solar System planet and the first to orbit a moon besides the Moon. Last Ariane 5 flight into heliocentric orbit.
117	5 July 2023	22:00	Ariane 5	Ariane 5 ECA	Syracuse 4B and Heinrich Hertz	Success	Final launch of the Ariane 5. Most recent flight from ELA-3.
