= Artemis (satellite) =

Telecommunications satellite, 2005–2014

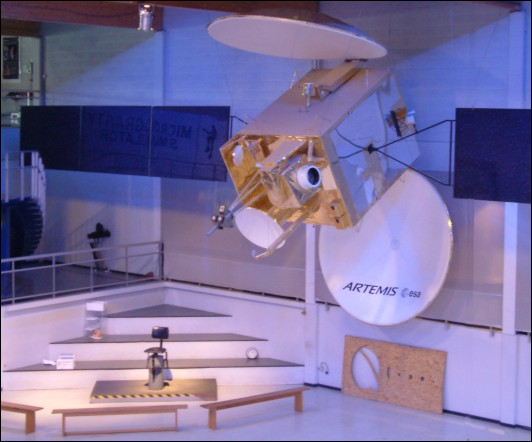
- Model of Artemis Satellite in original size.
- Operator: European Space Agency
- COSPAR ID: 2001-029A
- SATCAT no.: 26863
- Mission duration: 16 years

Start of mission
- Launch date: 12 July 2001, 21:58 UTC
- Rocket: Ariane 5G V142
- Launch site: Kourou ELA-3
- Contractor: Arianespace

End of mission
- Disposal: Placed in Graveyard orbit
- Deactivated: November 2017

Orbital parameters
- Reference system: Graveyard orbit
- Regime: Graveyard orbit

Artemis was a geostationary earth orbit satellite (GEOS) for telecommunications, built by Alenia Spazio for ESA. The Artemis satellite operated at the 21.5E orbital position until 2016, when it was moved to 123E to cover the L-Band spectrum rights for Indonesia's Ministry of Defense.

In November 2017, Artemis was retired and replaced to a graveyard orbit.

== History ==
The mission was planned for many years, with launch initially intended for 1995 and slipping; it was intended for launch on Ariane 5 but at one point there were suggestions that a Japanese H-II rocket might be used.

Launched by an Ariane 5 rocket on 12 July 2001, it originally reached an orbit much lower than planned (590 km x 17487 km) due to a malfunction in the launch vehicle's upper stage. It was remotely reconfigured to reach its intended station by means of a novel procedure. First, over the course of about a week, most of its chemical fuel was used to put it in a 31,000 km circular orbit (by raising first the apogee then the perigee, going via a 590 km x 31000 km orbit). Then, its RIT-10 gridded ion thruster — originally intended for station keeping and for firing a few minutes at a time — was instead kept running for most of 18 months, pushing the spacecraft into an outward spiral trajectory. It gained altitude at the rate of about 15 km per day, until it reached the intended geostationary orbit.

On January 1, 2014, Avanti Communications, a London-based company, took the ownership of the satellite.

== Payload ==
The Artemis satellite has several payloads

- SILEX (Semiconductor-laser Intersatellite Link Experiment) is a laser link, which has been used both to communicate with the SPOT-4 remote-sensing satellite and with a plane in flight. It uses a 60 mW AlGaAs laser diode as the transmitter and a photodiode detector, with a 25 cm telescope aperture, and a data rate of 50 Mbit/s; it weighs about 160 kg and uses 150 watts of power. The telescope is in a fork mounting. The system is designed and built by Astrium.
- SKDR (S/Ka band Data Relay), a system for relaying data from other satellites built by Alenia Spazio. This uses a 2.85-metre antenna.
- LLM (L-band Land Mobile), a system designed for satellite communication with fairly small vehicle-based terminals in Europe. This uses a second 2.85-metre antenna, providing four beams; one covers Europe from western Spain to eastern Turkey and from the southern point of Tunisia to the north of Norway, whilst three spot beams cover respectively France and Spain; central Europe and Italy; Turkey and south-East Europe.
- EGNOS navigation-signal transmitter
- An advanced ion propulsion system with 44 kg of xenon propellant

== Operations ==
In November 2001, the world's first laser intersatellite link was achieved in space by the European Space Agency (ESA) satellite Artemis, providing an optical data transmission link with the CNES Earth observation satellite SPOT 4. Achieving 50 Mbps across 40,000 km (25,000 mi), the distance of a LEO-GEO link. Since 2005, ARTEMIS has been relaying two-way optical signals from KIRARI, the Japanese Optical Intersatellite Communications Engineering Test Satellite.

As of 2005, Artemis was used operationally for data relay from ESA's satellites in low Earth orbit; a SILEX link to SPOT-4 was typically established daily. It was also used on a situational basis; for example, it was used in 2008 to relay information from the automated transfer vehicle Jules Verne while mission control at Houston was unavailable due to a hurricane.

It is now considered a precursor for the EDRS programme.

== Rental Dispute with Indonesia ==
In November 2017, Artemis was retired into the graveyard orbit after the Indonesian Ministry of Defence failed to pay outstanding rental lease for hiring the satellite to Avanti Communications. The dispute was settled after Avanti won the arbitration case in the London Court Of Arbitration in 2018, when Indonesia was forced to pay $20million.
