= Hot Bird 7 =

Communications satellite that was lost during a launch failure in 2002

- Mission type: Communications
- Operator: Eutelsat
- Website: https://www.eutelsat.com/en/home.html
- Mission duration: 15 years (planned); Failed to orbit

Spacecraft properties
- Spacecraft: Hot Bird 7
- Spacecraft type: Eurostar
- Bus: Eurostar-2000+
- Manufacturer: Astrium
- Launch mass: 3,300 kg (7,300 lb)
- Dry mass: 1,500 kg (3,300 lb)
- Dimensions: 2.3 × 3.4 × 5.2 m span: 27.9 m in orbit
- Power: 7.5 kW

Start of mission
- Launch date: 11 December 2002, 22:22 UTC
- Rocket: Ariane 5ECA (V157)
- Launch site: Centre Spatial Guyanais, ELA-3
- Contractor: Arianespace

Orbital parameters
- Reference system: Geocentric orbit (planned)
- Regime: Geostationary orbit
- Longitude: 13° East

Transponders
- Band: 40 Ku-band
- Coverage area: Europe, North Africa, Middle East

Hot Bird 7 was a communications satellite that was lost in a launch failure in 2002. Intended for operation by Eutelsat, it was to have provided direct-to-home broadcasting services from geostationary orbit as part of Eutelsat's Hot Bird constellation at a longitude of 13° East. Hot Bird 7 was intended to replace the Hot Bird 3 satellite, which had been launched in 1997.

Hot Bird 7 was constructed by Astrium, and was based on the Eurostar-2000+ satellite bus. It had a mass of 3,400 kg (7,500 lb) and was expected to have an operational lifespan of 15 years. The spacecraft was equipped with 40 Ku-band transponders, for broadcasting satellite television and radio. It would have broadcast to homes in Europe, the Middle East and North Africa.

Arianespace was contracted to launch Hot Bird 7 on the maiden flight of the Ariane 5ECA launch vehicle, an upgraded version of the Ariane 5 intended to offer increased payload capacity to Geostationary transfer orbit (GTO). The STENTOR technology demonstration satellite, to have been operated by the French space agency CNES, was also aboard the launch vehicle. The launch took place from ELA-3 at Centre Spatial Guyanais, at Kourou, in French Guiana, at 22:22 UTC on 11 December 2002, bound for geosynchronous transfer orbit.

Around three minutes after liftoff, performance issues with the first stage's Vulcain 2 engine, which was making its first flight, were noticed. By the time of fairing separation, 183 seconds into the flight, the rocket was tumbling out of control. It began to lose altitude and speed, before being destroyed by range safety officer 456 seconds after launch. The failure was attributed to an engine cooling problem that developed around 96 seconds into the mission, causing the engine to destroy itself. Due to the failure the next Ariane 5 launch, which had been scheduled to carry the European Space Agency's (ESA) Rosetta spacecraft in January 2003, was delayed — causing Rosetta to miss its launch window for a mission to comet 46P/Wirtanen. Rosetta was subsequently retargeted to 67P/Churyumov–Gerasimenko and launched successfully in 2004.
