= Master Control Facility =

Space research facility in Hassan, India

Coordinates: 13.0717°N 76.0994°E

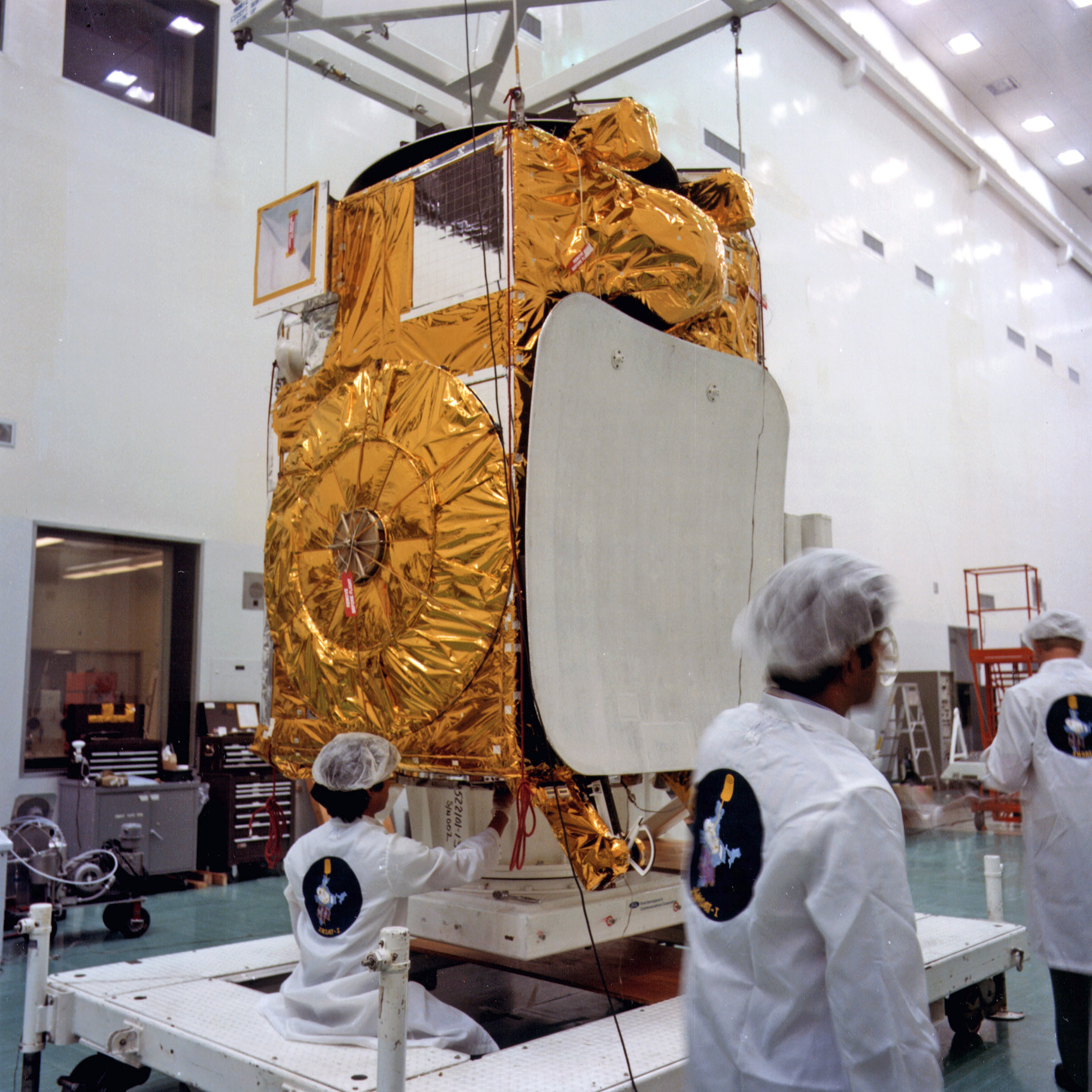
INSAT-1B, one of the first satellites to be controlled by MCF, Hassan

The Master Control Facility (MCF) is a facility set up by ISRO in the city of Hassan in the Indian state of Karnataka. Established in 1982, this facility is responsible for monitoring and controlling geostationary and geosynchronous satellites launched by ISRO. This was the only Master Control Facility of ISRO till another one was established in Bhopal in 2005.

== Establishment ==
When ISRO wanted a control facility, it inspected various sites that were offered to it within India. ISRO chose Hassan as the location (Location on Google Maps) because it was free of noise and encountered less terrestrial transmission than other proposed sites. Low interference was a must since the facility should be able to pick up even very weak signals from the satellite. The land to set up this facility was spread across 17.2 hectares and offered by the Government of Karnataka.

== Internal divisions ==
The MCF has three internal divisions; the Spacecraft Control Centre, Mission Control Centre and the Earth station.

=== Spacecraft Control Centre ===
This centre is responsible for controlling satellites and various commands are sent from this centre to the satellite to undertake the desired operations.

=== Mission Control Centre ===
This centre plays a major role main during the launch of the satellite and its initial period in space. This is the place where the Mission Director and the different designers of the various modules in the satellite keep a watch on the functioning of the satellite. They do this by studying and comprehending the various parameters of satellite via telemetry signals that the satellites send, related to the health of its various modules. In case of any deviation from the prescribed limits of the parameters, an automatic alarm is sounded and the respective designers discuss with the Mission Director and send corrections to the satellite from this centre.

=== Earth station ===
MCF has an integrated facility consisting of seven earth stations. The earth stations are assisted by an antenna array which provide the communication link between the satellite and the MCF (The link from earth station to satellite is UPLINK and from satellite to earth station is DOWNLINK). The MCF has 3 full-motion and about a dozen limited-motion antennas. The full-motion antennas can be turned around 360° and can be tilted from zero° to 90° in elevation. They send commands to the satellite, receive signals from it, thereby also helping to check that the satellite is in orbit. The full motion antennas are mostly used during the satellite launch and once the satellite is in its prescribed orbit, the limited motion antennas take over the communication link with the satellite.

== Satellites ==
Currently MCF controls the following 19 satellites: INSAT-3C, KALPANA-1, INSAT-3A, INSAT-4A, INSAT-4B, INSAT-4CR, GSAT-8, GSAT-12, GSAT-10, IRNSS-1A, INSAT-3D, GSAT-7, GSAT-14, IRNSS-1B, IRNSS-1C, GSAT-16 IRNSS-1D, GSAT-6 and GSAT-15 satellites. Of these 19 satellites 16 are controlled from MCF Hassan and three are controlled from MCF Bhopal (INSAT-3C, INSAT-4CR and GSAT-12.) In October 1997, the MCF lost contact with the INSAT-2D satellite which was a serious blow to ISRO. This glitch also affected the National Stock Exchange at Mumbai which had to suspend trading on 3 October 1997 till the VSAT terminals which it depended on were transferred to INSAT-2A.Previously, this facility also controlled ISRO's earlier generation of satellites, like the INSAT-1B.

GSAT-10 was successfully launched on 29 September 2012 at 2:48 am (IST) on board Ariane-5 rocket from Europe's spaceport in French Guiana. It has been put in its defined slot of 83° East. GSAT-10 carries the 12 high power Ku-band transponders, 6 extended C-Band Transponders each having a bandwidth of 36 MHz with power of 15 W, 12 C-Band transponders and GAGAN Navigation payload.

== INSAT Master Control Facility ==
The INSAT Master Control Facility is one of the centers of Indian Space Research Organisation, which is responsible for post-launch operations on INSAT, GSAT and IRNSS satellites including orbit manoeuvres, station-keeping, on-orbit and decommissioning operations. INSAT MCF of ISRO are located at two locations, Hassan in the South Indian state of Karnataka and at Bhopal in Madhya Pradesh. At present, the centers support on-orbit operations of INSAT-3C, KALPANA-1, INSAT-3A, INSAT-4A, INSAT-4B, INSAT-4CR, GSAT-8, GSAT-12, GSAT-10, IRNSS-1A, INSAT-3D, GSAT-7, GSAT-14, IRNSS-1B, IRNSS-1C, GSAT-16, IRNSS-1D, GSAT-6 and GSAT-15 satellites.
