= INSAT-3E =

Indian communications satellite, 2003–2014

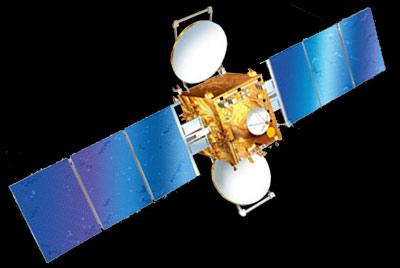
- Mission type: Communications
- Operator: INSAT
- COSPAR ID: 2003-047E
- SATCAT no.: 27951
- Mission duration: 10 years, 5 months, 5 days

Spacecraft properties
- Bus: I-2K
- Manufacturer: ISRO
- Launch mass: 2,775 kilograms (6,118 lb)
- Dry mass: 1,218 kilograms (2,685 lb)
- Dimensions: 2.0×1.77×2.8 metres (6.6×5.8×9.2 ft)
- Power: 2,400 watts

Start of mission
- Launch date: 27 September 2003, 23:14:46 UTC
- Rocket: Ariane 5G V162
- Launch site: Kourou ELA-3
- Contractor: Arianespace

End of mission
- Disposal: Moved to a graveyard orbit

Orbital parameters
- Reference system: Geosynchronous
- Regime: Geostationary (till 2014); Graveyard Orbit
- Longitude: 55° east (till 2014)
- Periapsis altitude: 35,764 kilometres (22,223 mi) (till 2014)
- Apoapsis altitude: 35,819 kilometres (22,257 mi) (till 2014)
- Inclination: 0.06 degrees
- Period: 23.93 hours
- Epoch: 30 October 2013, 02:33:58 UTC

Transponders
- Band: 24 C band 12 Extended C band

INSAT 3E is a defunct communication satellite built by Indian Space Research Organisation. It was launched on September 28, 2003, from the European Space Agency's spaceport in French Guiana on board the Ariane rocket. The satellite had a launch mass of 2750 kilograms. It is the 4th satellite launched in the INSAT-3 series for INSAT. It was designed for providing high-speed communication, Television, VSAT & Tele-education services and was an important landmark in Indian Space Programme.

In April 2014, almost eleven years after being launched, the satellite ran out of oxidizer and a few days later, was decommissioned by the ISRO. A few days later, it was moved into a graveyard orbit.

== Launch ==
INSAT 3E was launched from Kourou, French Guiana on September 28, 2003, on European consortium Ariane space's Ariane 5-V162 launcher along with two other satellites viz. Eurobird 3 of Eutelsat and SMART-1 of European Space Agency at 4.44 am IST.It was placed into a geosynchronous transfer orbit 30 minutes after the lift-off, in 3-axis stabilised mode, with a perigee of 649 km and an apogee of 35,923 km and an inclination of 7 deg. with respect to the equator. Its master control facility is at Hassan, Karnataka (India).

== Payload ==
INSAT 3E payload consists of C-band and extended C-band transponders. It has 24 C-band transponders, having India beam coverage providing an Edge Of Coverage-Effective Isotropic Radiated Power (EOC-EIRP) of 38.5 dBW and 12 upper extended C-band transponders having India beam coverage providing an EOC-EIRP of 38 dBW.

== Retirement ==
On April 1, 2014, Dr. K. Radhakrishnan, while speaking to the Indian English newspaper "The Hindu", said that INSAT 3E had been decommissioned. The newspaper reported that a few days before, the satellite had run out of the on-board oxidizer, which is essential to burn the fuel that kept it Earth-locked (fixed over India) and running its daily functions. The ISRO had apparently expected that the satellite, positioned at 55 degrees E longitude, would last a few more months and that it would be smoothly replaced with GSAT-16. The Master Control Facility at Hassan moved the expired satellite into a graveyard orbit a few days after.

== Services ==
- Television
- VSAT
- Communication
- Tele-education providing education to the poor and needy
- Tele-medicine administering medical services from the metros to villages & remote areas
