= Al Yah 1 =

Communications satellite

- Names: Yahsat 1A
- Mission type: Communications
- Operator: Yahsat
- COSPAR ID: 2011-016B
- SATCAT no.: 37393
- Mission duration: 15 years

Spacecraft properties
- Bus: Eurostar-3000
- Manufacturer: EADS Astrium
- Launch mass: 5,965 kilograms (13,151 lb)
- Power: 15,000 watts

Start of mission
- Launch date: 22 April 2011, 21:37 UTC
- Rocket: Ariane 5ECA VA201
- Launch site: Kourou ELA-3
- Contractor: Arianespace

Orbital parameters
- Reference system: Geocentric
- Regime: Geostationary
- Longitude: 52.5° east
- Perigee altitude: 35,782 kilometres (22,234 mi)
- Apogee altitude: 35,802 kilometres (22,246 mi)
- Inclination: 0.00 degrees
- Period: 23.93 hours
- Epoch: 29 October 2013, 15:52:23 UTC

Al Yah 1, formerly known as Yahsat 1A, is a communications satellite constructed by EADS Astrium and Thales Alenia Space for Al Yah Satellite Communications Company (Yahsat). It was launched in April 2011 from Arianespace's Guiana Space Centre in Kourou French Guiana in a dual payload launch with Intelsat New Dawn atop an Ariane 5 ECA rocket. Yahsat Y1A is based on the Eurostar E3000 satellite bus and had a launch mass of about 6000 kg. It is intended to provide Ku, Ka and C-band communications to the Middle East, Africa, Europe and Southwest Asia. It is in geosynchronous orbit at 52.5 degrees East.
