= Aestus =

Rocket engine

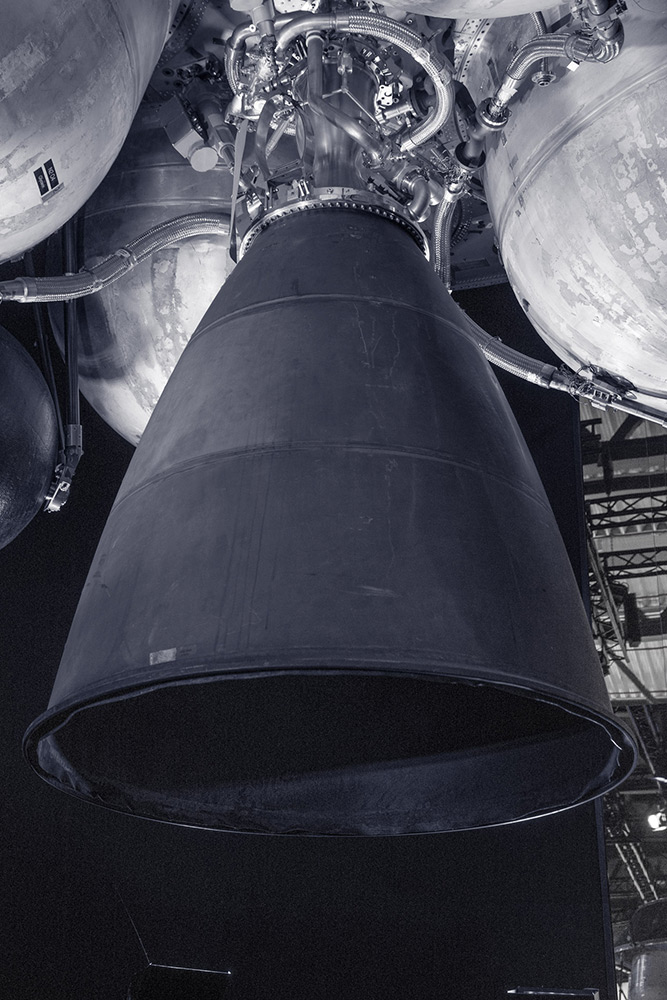
- Country of origin: Germany
- First flight: 30 October 1997
- Last flight: 25 July 2018
- Designer: Ottobrunn Space Propulsion Centre
- Manufacturer: Astrium
- Application: Upper stage engine for the orbital insertion of heavy payloads
- Successor: Aestus II
- Status: Retired

Liquid-fuel engine
- Propellant: Nitrogen tetroxide (N_{2}O_{4}) / MMH
- Mixture ratio: 1.9
- Cycle: Pressure-fed engine

Configuration
- Nozzle ratio: 84

Performance
- Thrust, vacuum: 29.6 kN (6,654 lb_{f})
- Chamber pressure: 11 bar
- Specific impulse, vacuum: 324 s (3.18 km/s)
- Burn time: 1100 s

Dimensions
- Length: 2.20 m
- Diameter: 1.31 m
- Dry mass: 111 kg

Used in
- Ariane 5 G and ES; Ariane 6.1 (proposed)

Aestus II / RS-72
- Country of origin: Germany, United States
- Designer: Ottobrunn Space Propulsion Centre, Pratt & Whitney Rocketdyne
- Manufacturer: Astrium, Pratt & Whitney Rocketdyne
- Application: Upper stage engine for the orbital insertion of heavy payloads
- Predecessor: Aestus
- Status: In development

Liquid-fuel engine
- Propellant: Nitrogen tetroxide (N_{2}O_{4}) / MMH
- Mixture ratio: 1.9
- Cycle: Pump-fed engine
- Pumps: XLR-132

Configuration
- Nozzle ratio: 84

Performance
- Thrust, vacuum: 55.4 kN (12,450 lb_{f})
- Chamber pressure: 60 bar
- Specific impulse, vacuum: 340 s (3.3 km/s)
- Burn time: 600 s

Dimensions
- Length: 2.29 m
- Diameter: 1.31 m
- Dry mass: 138 kg

Aestus is a hypergolic liquid rocket engine used on an upper stage of Ariane 5 family rockets for the orbital insertion. It features unique design of 132 coaxial injection elements causing swirl mixing of the MMH propellants with nitrogen tetroxide oxidizer. The pressure-fed engine allows for multiple re-ignitions.

== Operations ==
Fuel and oxidizer are stored in two aluminium alloy tanks, fuel tank is spherical while oxidizer tank is enlarged due to different volumes required from engine operations. Before the engine is started, it is purged with helium and fuel is pressurized. Then the oxidizer valve is opened in a center of injector, followed by fuel injectors arranged on a chamber wall. Hypergolic propellants spontaneously ignite on contact, expanding to supersonic velocities and escaping through cooled nozzle extension.

== History ==
Aestus was developed by the Ottobrunn Space Propulsion Centre between 1988 and 1995 with first flight as an upper stage of Ariane 5 G flight 502 and performed as designed. The first improvements were developed between 1999 and 2002 improving the frame performance and adjusting propellant mixture ratio from 2.05 to 1.90 with a first flight on an Ariane 5 flight 518 on 26 February 2004. Ignition qualification programme preparing engine for handling new Automated Transfer Vehicle that requires 3 ignitions per flight was completed in 2007 and flew with Jules Verne ATV on Ariane 5 flight 528.

== Aestus II / RS-72 ==
Aestus II (also known as RS-72) was a turbopump-fed version of the pressure-fed Aestus developed in a collaboration between the Ottobrunn Space Propulsion Centre and Pratt & Whitney Rocketdyne (Boeing Rocketdyne at the time). It was designed for improved performance, thrust and reliability over its predecessor.

Aestus II development was supported by Pratt & Whitney Rocketdyne which provided turbopump for the engine. The first prototype variant, called RS-72 Pathfinder, successfully completed 14 tests at the White Sands Test Facility, reaching a 60 second burn time at 100% power in May 2000.
