= Sky Sport Football =

- Sky Sport Football
- Country: Italy
- Broadcast area: United Kingdom; Ireland
- Headquarters: Sky Campus, Isleworth, London, England

Ownership
- Owner: Sky Group (Comcast)
- Sister channels: List of Sky UK channels

History
- Launched: 31 May 2003; 23 years ago

Links
- Webcast: Hot Bird 13B
- Website: skysport.it

Sky Sport Football television channel established in 2003 that specializes in European football matches and the owner company is Sky Italia under the name Sky Sport 3, coinciding with the debut of the Sky satellite platform.

== History ==
The channel was launched on 31 July 2003 under the name Sky Sport 3, coinciding with the debut of the Sky satellite platform. On 2 July 2018, it was rebranded under its current name and became part of the Sky Calcio package. From that date, it was broadcast on channel 203 and was also available via streaming services Sky Go and Now.

On 3 July 2023, following a reorganization of Sky Sport channels, the channel ceased operations. Its programming was redistributed across other channels within the Sky Sport package.

== See also ==
- Sky Sports
- Sky TG24
- Sky Sport 24
- Sky Sport Uno
- Sky Sport MotoGP
- Sky Sport Arena
