= INSAT-3A =

Multipurpose satellite launched in 2003

INSAT 3A
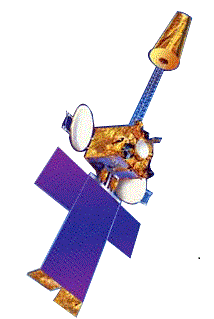
- Mission type: Communications; Weather
- Operator: INSAT
- COSPAR ID: 2003-013A
- SATCAT no.: 27714
- Website: INSAT 3A

Spacecraft properties
- Manufacturer: ISRO
- Launch mass: 2,950 kilograms (6,500 lb)
- Dry mass: 1,348 kilograms
- Dimensions: 2.8 x 1.7 x 2.0 metres
- Power: 3.1 kilowatts

Start of mission
- Launch date: 9 April 2003, 22:52 UTC
- Rocket: Ariane 5G V160
- Launch site: Kourou ELA-3
- Contractor: Arianespace

Orbital parameters
- Reference system: Geocentric
- Regime: Geostationary
- Longitude: 93.5° East (0°N +93.5°E)
- Inclination: 74 degrees
- Period: 12 years

INSAT-3A, a multipurpose satellite built by ISRO was launched by Ariane in April 2003. It is located at 93.5 degree East longitude. It is third satellite in INSAT-3 series after INSAT-3B & INSAT-3C. Built at a cost of $53 mn, it provides communication, weather, and search and rescue services.

== Launch ==
INSAT 3A was launched by Ariane-5 launch vehicle of Arianespace on April 9, 2003, at 22.52 UTC from Kourou, French Guiana. It was placed into a Geosynchronous Transfer Orbit (GTO), 30 minutes after the lift-off in 3-axis stabilized mode, with a perigee (nearest point to earth) of 859 km and an apogee (farthest point to earth) of 36,055 km and an inclination of 1.99 degrees with respect to the equator. Its co-passenger on its launch was GALAXI-XII of PanAmSat. Its Master Control Facility (MCF) is located at Hassan, Karnataka (India). It is 3-axis body stabilised in orbit using momentum and reaction wheels, solar flaps, magnetic torquers and eight 10 N and eight 22 N reaction control thrusters. Its propulsion system consists of 440 N Liquid Apogee Motor MON-3 (Mixed Oxides of Nitrogen) and MMH (MonoMethylHydrazine) for orbit raising.

The satellite raised its orbit to GEO and arrived in the 93.5 degree East longitude orbital location. It joined INSAT-3B and INSAT-3C which were already in orbit operating from a similar orbital location.

== Payload ==
=== Communication payload ===
The INSAT-3A communications payload consists of:

- 12 Normal C-band transponders (9 channels provide expanded coverage from Middle East to South East Asia with an EIRP of 38 dBW, 3 channels provide India coverage with an EIRP of 36 dBW and 6 Extended C-band transponders provide India coverage with an EIRP of 36 dBW).
- 6 upper extended C-band transponders having India beam coverage providing an EoC-EIRP of 37 dBW.
- 6 Ku-band transponders provide India coverage with EIRP of 48 dBW.

=== Meteorological payload ===
The INSAT-3A meteorological payload consists of

- A Very High Resolution Radiometer (VHRR) with imaging capacity in the visible (0.55-0.75 μm), thermal infrared (10.5-12.5 μm) and Water Vapour (5.7-7.1 μm) channels, provide 2x2 km, 8x8 km and 8x8 km ground resolutions respectively.
- A CCD camera provides 1x1 km ground resolution, in the visible (0.63-0.69 μm), near infrared (0.77-0.86 μm) and shortwave infrared (1.55-1.70 μm) bands.
- A Data Relay Transponder (DRT) having global receive coverage with a 400 MHz uplink and 4500 MHz downlink for relay of meteorological, hydrological and oceanographic data from unattended land and ocean-based automatic data collection-cum-transmission platforms.
- A Satellite Aided Search and Rescue (SAS&R) SARP payload having global receive coverage with 406 MHz uplink and 4500 MHz downlink with India coverage, for relay of signals from distress beacons in sea, air or land. See also Cospas-Sarsat.

== Services ==
- Telecommunications
- Television broadcasting
- Meteorological
- Search and Rescue services
