= Eutelsat 33E =

Communications satellite

Eutelat 33E
- Names: Hot Bird 10 (2009); Atlantic Bird 4A (2009–2011); Eutelsat 3C (2011–2013); Hot Bird 13D (2013–2016); Eutelsat 33E (2016–present) Leased capacity: Nilesat 104 (2009–2012)
- Mission type: Communication
- Operator: Eutelsat
- COSPAR ID: 2009-008B
- SATCAT no.: 33750
- Website: www.eutelsat.com/en/satellites/the-fleet/EUTELSAT-33E.html
- Mission duration: 15 years

Spacecraft properties
- Bus: Eurostar-3000
- Manufacturer: Astrium
- Launch mass: 4,892 kilograms (10,785 lb)

Start of mission
- Launch date: 12 February 2009, 22:09 UTC
- Rocket: Ariane 5ECA
- Launch site: Kourou ELA-3
- Contractor: Arianespace

Orbital parameters
- Reference system: Geocentric
- Regime: Geostationary
- Longitude: 7° West (2009–2011); 3° East (2011–2013); 13° East (2013–2016); 33° East (2016–present)
- Slot: Hot Bird (2013–2016)

Transponders
- Band: 64 Ku-band
- Coverage area: Europe; North Africa; Middle East

Eutelsat 33E, previously known as Hot Bird 10, Atlantic Bird 4A, Eutelsat 3B and Nilesat 104, Hot Bird 13D is a French communications satellite. Operated by Eutelsat, it provides direct to home broadcasting services from geostationary orbit as part of Eutelsat's Hot Bird constellation at a longitude of 13 degrees east.

Eutelsat 33E was constructed by Astrium, and is based on the Eurostar-3000 satellite bus. It has a mass of 4,892 kilograms (10,785 lb) and is expected to operate for 15 years. The spacecraft has 64 Ku-band transponders, broadcasting satellite television and radio to Europe, North Africa and the Middle East.

Hot Bird 10, as it was then named, was launched by Arianespace using an Ariane 5ECA carrier rocket, as part of a dual launch with the NSS-9 spacecraft. Two French military satellites, Spirale-A and Spirale-B were also carried, as secondary payloads. The launch took place from ELA-3 at Kourou, French Guiana, at 22:09 UTC on 12 February 2009. The spacecraft was deployed into geosynchronous transfer orbit, raising itself to its operational geostationary orbit by means of its apogee motor.

Upon its entry into service, prior to becoming part of Eutelsat's Hot Bird fleet, the Hot Bird 10 satellite was used to cover two orbital positions for satellites still awaiting launch. In 2009 it was temporarily renamed Atlantic Bird 4A, and placed at a longitude of 7 degrees west ahead of the September 2011 launch of Atlantic Bird 7. During this time, some of the transponders aboard the satellite were leased by Nilesat and operated as Nilesat 104. Atlantic Bird 7 entered service in October 2011; on 1 November Atlantic Bird 4A was moved to 3 degrees east as Eutelsat 3C, to cover for Eutelsat 3B. It was moved to 13 degrees east in July 2013 and renamed Hot Bird 13D under the new designation system Eutelsat had introduced in 2012. The spacecraft is co-located with Hot Bird 13B and Hot Bird 13C.
