= Ariane 5 =

European heavy-lift space launch vehicle (1996–2023)

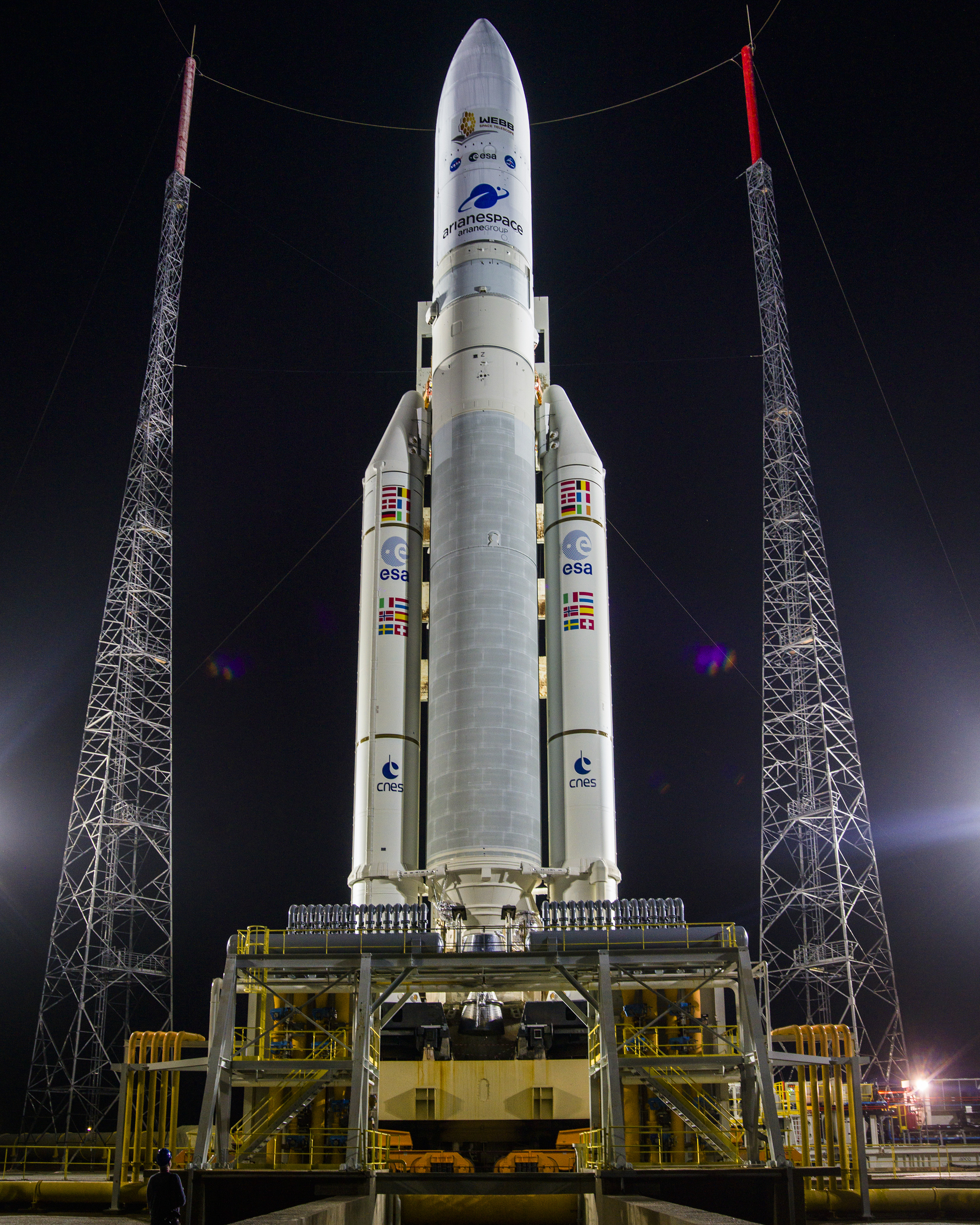
- Ariane 5 flight VA-256 on the launch pad with the James Webb Space Telescope in December 2021
- Function: Heavy-lift launch vehicle
- Manufacturer: ArianeGroup
- Country of origin: European multi-national (Note: The lead manufacturer is from France, but the rocket has significant contributions from companies based in Germany, Italy, Spain, Belgium, Switzerland and Sweden.)
- Cost per launch: €150–200 million (2016)

Size
- Height: 46–52 m (151–171 ft)
- Diameter: 5.4 m (18 ft)
- Mass: 777,000 kg (1,713,000 lb)
- Stages: 2.5

Capacity

Payload to LEO
- Altitude: 260 km (160 mi) (circular)
- Orbital inclination: 51.6°
- Mass: G: 16,000 kg (35,000 lb); ES: >20,000 kg (44,000 lb)

Payload to GTO
- Mass: G: 6,950 kg (15,320 lb); G+: 6,950 kg (15,320 lb); GS: 6,100 kg (13,400 lb); ECA: 10,865 kg (23,953 lb)

Associated rockets
- Family: Ariane
- Based on: Ariane 4
- Derivative work: Ariane 6
- Comparable: Atlas V; Delta IV Heavy; Falcon 9 Block 5; H-IIB; Long March 5; LVM3; Proton-M

Launch history
- Status: Retired
- Launch sites: Guiana Space Centre, ELA-3
- Total launches: 117 (G: 16, G+: 3, GS: 6, ES: 8, ECA: 72, ECA+: 12)
- Success(es): 112 (G: 13, G+: 3, GS: 6, ES: 8, ECA: 70, ECA+: 12)
- Failure: 2 (G: 1, ECA: 1)
- Partial failure: 3 (G: 2, ECA: 1)
- First flight: G: 4 June 1996; G+: 2 March 2004; GS: 11 August 2005; ECA: 11 December 2002; ES: 9 March 2008; ECA+: 6 August 2019
- Last flight: G: 27 September 2003; G+: 18 December 2004; GS: 18 December 2009; ES: 25 July 2018; ECA: 26 November 2019; ECA+: 5 July 2023
- Carries passengers or cargo: XMM-Newton; Envisat; Rosetta; ATV; Herschel; Planck; Galileo; James Webb Space Telescope

Boosters (G, G+) – EAP P238
- No. boosters: 2
- Height: 31.6 m (104 ft)
- Diameter: 3.06 m (10.0 ft)
- Gross mass: 270,000 kg (600,000 lb)
- Maximum thrust: 6,650 kN (1,490,000 lb_{f})
- Total thrust: 13,300 kN (3,000,000 lb_{f})
- Burn time: 130 seconds
- Propellant: AP, Al, HTPB

Boosters (GS, ECA, ES) – EAP P241
- No. boosters: 2
- Height: 31.6 m (104 ft)
- Diameter: 3.06 m (10.0 ft)
- Empty mass: 33,000 kg (73,000 lb)
- Gross mass: 273,000 kg (602,000 lb)
- Maximum thrust: 7,080 kN (1,590,000 lb_{f})
- Total thrust: 14,160 kN (3,180,000 lb_{f})
- Burn time: 140 seconds
- Propellant: AP, Al, HTPB

First stage (G, G+, GS) – EPC H158
- Height: 23.8 m (78 ft)
- Diameter: 5.4 m (18 ft)
- Empty mass: 12,200 kg (26,900 lb)
- Gross mass: 170,500 kg (375,900 lb)
- Powered by: G/G+: 1 × Vulcain 1 GS: 1 × Vulcain 1B
- Maximum thrust: vac: 1,015 kN (228,000 lb_{f})
- Specific impulse: vac: 440 s (4.3 km/s)
- Burn time: 605 seconds
- Propellant: LH_{2} / LOX

First stage (ECA, ES) – EPC H173
- Height: 23.8 m (78 ft)
- Diameter: 5.4 m (18 ft)
- Empty mass: 14,700 kg (32,400 lb)
- Gross mass: 184,700 kg (407,200 lb)
- Powered by: 1 × Vulcain 2
- Maximum thrust: SL: 960 kN (220,000 lb_{f}) vac: 1,390 kN (310,000 lb_{f})
- Specific impulse: SL: 310 s (3.0 km/s) vac: 432 s (4.24 km/s)
- Burn time: 540 seconds
- Propellant: LH_{2} / LOX

Second stage (G) – EPS L9.7
- Height: 3.4 m (11 ft)
- Diameter: 5.4 m (18 ft)
- Empty mass: 1,200 kg (2,600 lb)
- Gross mass: 10,900 kg (24,000 lb)
- Powered by: 1 × Aestus
- Maximum thrust: 27 kN (6,100 lb_{f})
- Burn time: 1,100 seconds
- Propellant: MMH / N_{2}O_{4}

Second stage (G+, GS, ES) – EPS L10
- Height: 3.4 m (11 ft)
- Diameter: 5.4 m (18 ft)
- Empty mass: 1,200 kg (2,600 lb)
- Gross mass: 11,200 kg (24,700 lb)
- Powered by: 1 × Aestus
- Maximum thrust: 27 kN (6,100 lb_{f})
- Burn time: 1,170 seconds
- Propellant: MMH / N_{2}O_{4}

Second stage (ECA, ECA+) – ESC
- Height: 4.711 m (15.46 ft)
- Diameter: 5.4 m (18 ft)
- Empty mass: 4,540 kg (10,010 lb)
- Gross mass: 19,440 kg (42,860 lb)
- Powered by: 1 × HM7B
- Maximum thrust: 67 kN (15,000 lb_{f})
- Specific impulse: 446 seconds
- Burn time: 945 seconds
- Propellant: LH_{2} / LOX

Ariane 5 (French: [aʁjan sɛ̃k]) was a European heavy-lift space launch vehicle operated by Arianespace for the European Space Agency (ESA). It was launched from the Guiana Space Centre (CSG) in French Guiana. It was used to deliver payloads into geostationary transfer orbit (GTO), low Earth orbit (LEO) or further into space. The launch vehicle had a streak of 82 consecutive successful launches between 9 April 2003 and 12 December 2017. In development since 2014, Ariane 6, a direct successor system was first launched in 2024.

The system was designed as an expendable launch vehicle by the Centre National d'Études Spatiales (CNES), the French government's space agency, in cooperation with various European partners. Despite not being a direct derivative of its predecessor launch vehicle program, it was classified as part of the Ariane rocket family. Aérospatiale, and later ArianeGroup, was the prime contractor for the manufacturing of the vehicles, leading a multi-country consortium of other European contractors. Ariane 5 was originally intended to launch the Hermes spacecraft, and thus it was rated for human space launches.

Since its first launch, Ariane 5 was refined in successive versions: "G", "G+", "GS", "ECA", and finally, "ES". The system had a commonly used dual-launch capability, where up to two large geostationary belt communication satellites can be mounted using a SYLDA (Système de Lancement Double Ariane, meaning "Ariane Double-Launch System") carrier system. Up to three, somewhat smaller, main satellites are possible depending on size using a SPELTRA (Structure Porteuse Externe Lancement Triple Ariane, which translates to "Ariane Triple-Launch External Carrier Structure"). Up to eight secondary payloads, usually small experiment packages or minisatellites, could be carried with an ASAP (Ariane Structure for Auxiliary Payloads) platform.

Following the launch of 15 August 2020, Arianespace signed the contracts for the last eight Ariane 5 launches, before it was succeeded by the new Ariane 6 launcher, according to Daniel Neuenschwander, director of space transportation at the ESA. Ariane 5 flew its final mission on 5 July 2023.

== Vehicle description ==
=== Cryogenic main stage ===
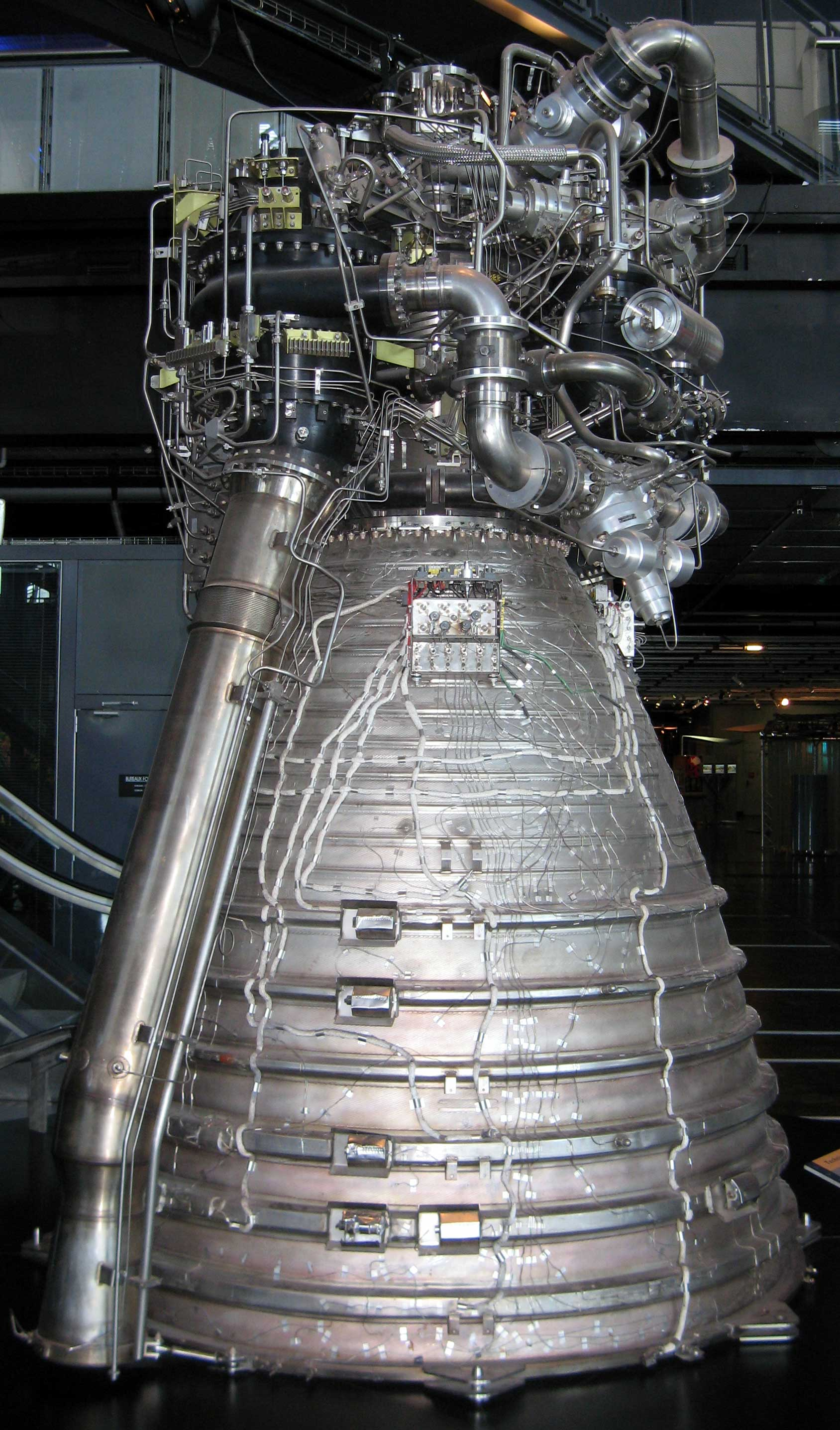
Vulcain 1 engine, used for Ariane 5G, G+, and GS

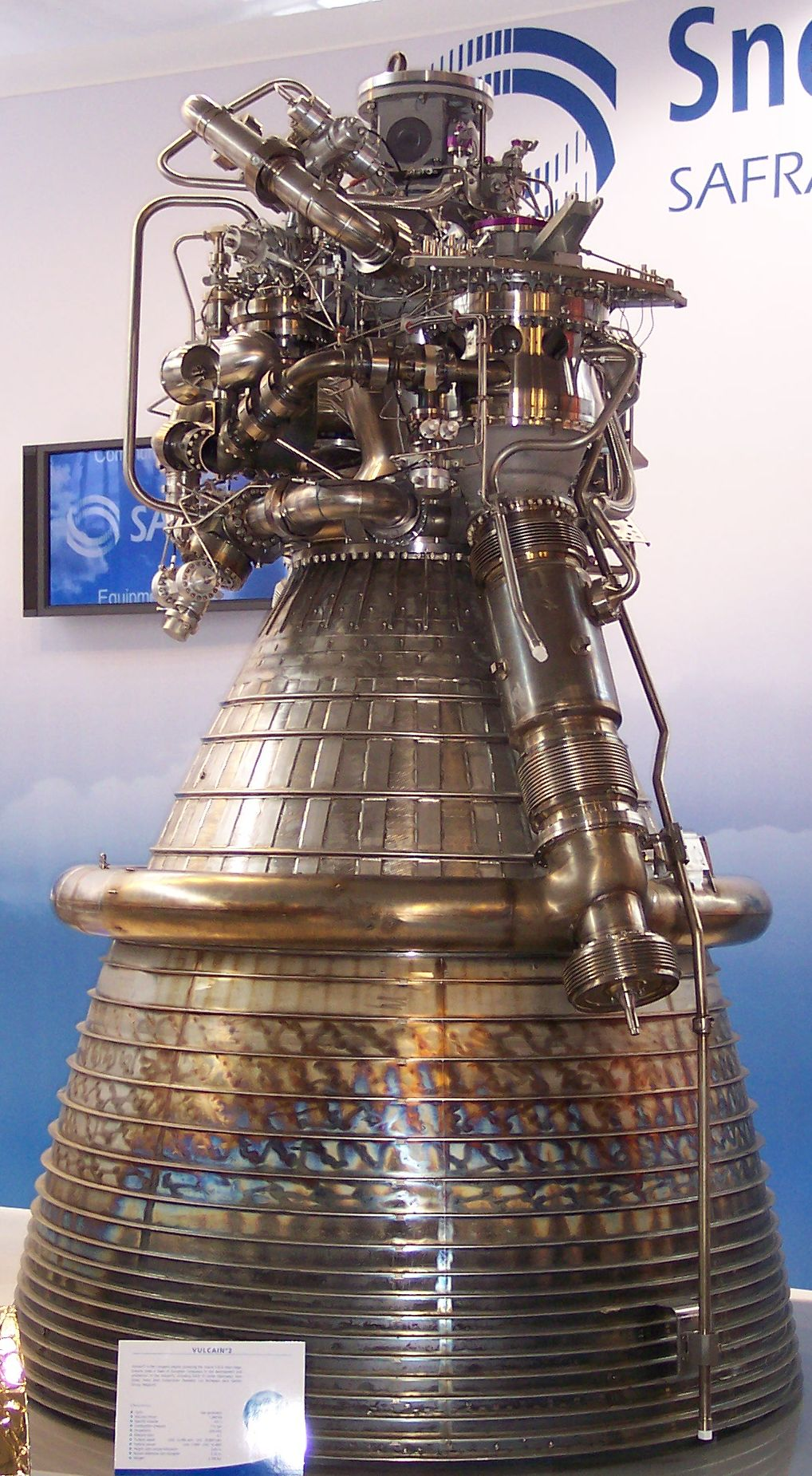
Vulcain 2 engine, used for Ariane 5ECA, ECA+, and ES

Ariane 5's cryogenic H173 main stage (H158 for Ariane 5G, G+, and GS) was called the EPC (Étage Principal Cryotechnique — Cryotechnic Main Stage). It consisted of a 5.4 m (18 ft) diameter by 30.5 m (100 ft) high tank with two compartments, one for liquid oxygen and one for liquid hydrogen, and a Vulcain 2 (Vulcain 1 for Ariane 5G, G+, and GS) engine at the base with a vacuum thrust of 1,390 kN (310,000 lb_{f}). The H173 EPC weighed about 189 t (417,000 lb), including 175 t (386,000 lb) of propellant. After the main cryogenic stage runs out of fuel, it re-entered the atmosphere for an ocean splashdown.

=== Solid boosters ===
Attached to the sides were two P241 (P238 for Ariane 5G and G+) solid rocket boosters (SRBs or EAPs from the French Étages d'Accélération à Poudre — lit. 'Powder Acceleration Stages'), each weighing about 277 t (611,000 lb) full and delivering a thrust of about 7,080 kN (1,590,000 lb_{f}). They were fueled by a mix of ammonium perchlorate (68%) and aluminium fuel (18%) and HTPB (14%). They each burned for 130 seconds before being dropped into the ocean. The SRBs were usually allowed to sink to the bottom of the ocean, but, like the Space Shuttle Solid Rocket Boosters, they could be recovered with parachutes, and this was occasionally done for post-flight analysis. Unlike Space Shuttle SRBs, Ariane 5 boosters were not reused. The most recent attempt was for the first Ariane 5 ECA mission in 2009. One of the two boosters was successfully recovered and returned to the Guiana Space Center for analysis. Prior to that mission, the last such recovery and testing was done in 2003.

The French M51 submarine-launched ballistic missile (SLBM) shared a substantial amount of technology with these boosters.

In February 2000, the suspected nose cone of an Ariane 5 booster washed ashore on the South Texas coast, and was recovered by beachcombers before the government could get to it.

=== Second stage ===
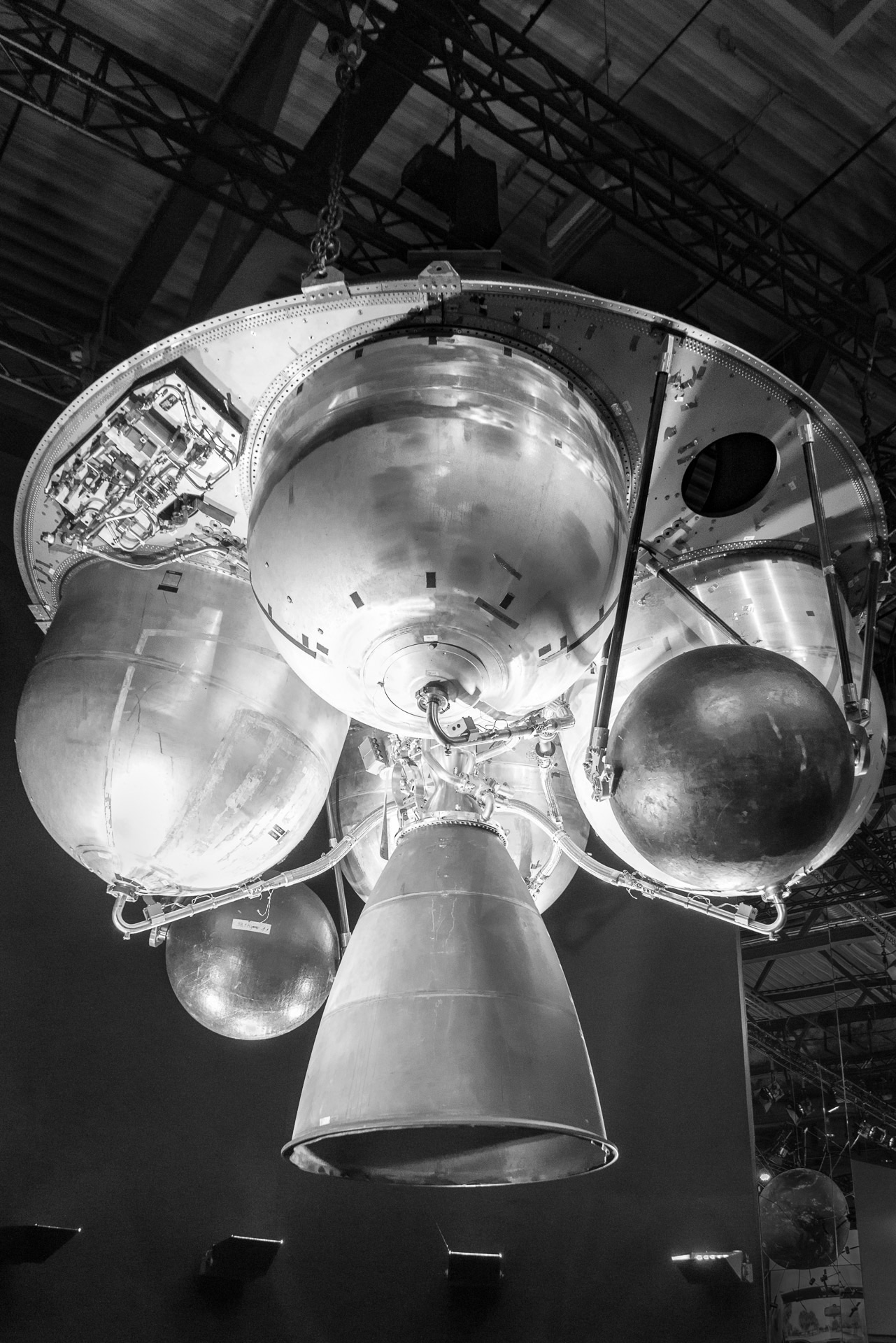
EPS Upper Stage used on Ariane 5ES

The second stage was on top of the main stage and below the payload. The original Ariane — Ariane 5G — used the EPS (Étage à Propergols Stockables — Storable Propellant Stage), which was fueled by monomethylhydrazine (MMH) and nitrogen tetroxide, containing 10,000 kg (22,000 lb) of storable propellant. The EPS was subsequently improved for use on the Ariane 5G+, GS, and ES.

The EPS upper stage was capable of repeated ignition, first demonstrated during flight V26 which was launched on 5 October 2007. This was purely to test the engine, and occurred after the payloads had been deployed. The first operational use of restart capability as part of a mission came on 9 March 2008, when two burns were made to deploy the first Automated Transfer Vehicle (ATV) into a circular parking orbit, followed by a third burn after ATV deployment to de-orbit the stage. This procedure was repeated for all subsequent ATV flights.

Ariane 5ECA used the ESC (Étage Supérieur Cryotechnique — Cryogenic Upper Stage), which was fueled by liquid hydrogen and liquid oxygen. The ESC used the HM7B engine previously used in the Ariane 4 third stage. The propellent load of 14.7 tonne allowed the engine to burn for 945 seconds while providing 6.5 tonne of thrust. The ESC provided roll control during powered flight and full attitude control during payload separation using hydrogen gas thrusters. Oxygen gas thrusters allowed longitudinal acceleration after engine cutoff. The flight assembly included the Vehicle Equipment Bay, with flight electronics for the entire rocket, and the payload interface and structural support.

=== Fairing ===
The payload and all upper stages were covered at launch by a fairing for aerodynamic stability and protection from heating during supersonic flight and acoustic loads. It was jettisoned once sufficient altitude has been reached, typically above 100 km (62 mi; 54 nmi). It was made by Ruag Space and since flight VA-238 it was composed of 4 panels.

=== Launch preparations ===
With the exception of the solid rocket boosters (for safety and cost reasons), the components were assembled in Europe, and then shipped to French Guyana by boat. Once at Kourou, the components were assembled in the Launcher Integration Building (BIL), then transferred into the Final Assembly Building (BAF) for mating the payload and fairing, before the completed rocket was transferred to the Launch Zone (ZL) for fueling and launch.

== Variants ==
Variant	Description
G	The original version was dubbed Ariane 5G (Generic) and had a launch mass of 737 t (1,625,000 lb). Its payload capability to geostationary transfer orbit (GTO) was 6,900 kg (15,200 lb) for a single satellite or 6,100 kg (13,400 lb) for dual launches. It flew 16 times with one failure and two partial failures.
G+	The Ariane 5G+ had an improved EPS second stage, with a GTO capacity of 7,100 kg (15,700 lb) for a single payload or 6,300 kg (13,900 lb) for two. It flew three times in 2004, with no failures.
GS	At the time of the failure of the first Ariane 5ECA flight in 2002, all Ariane 5 launchers in production were ECA versions. Some of the ECA cores were modified to use the original Vulcain engine and tank volumes while the failure was investigated; these vehicles were designated Ariane 5GS. The GS used the improved EAP boosters of the ECA variant and the improved EPS of the G+ variant, but the increased mass of the modified ECA core compared to the G and G+ core resulted in slightly reduced payload capacity. Ariane 5GS could carry a single payload of 6,600 kg (14,600 lb) or a dual payload of 5,800 kg (12,800 lb) to GTO. The Ariane 5GS flew 6 times from 2005 to 2009 with no failures.
ECA	The Ariane 5ECA (Evolution Cryotechnique type A), first flown in 2002 but ending in failure, and first successfully flown in 2005, used an improved Vulcain 2 first-stage engine with a longer, more efficient nozzle with a more efficient flow cycle and denser propellant ratio. The new ratio required length modifications to the first-stage tanks. The EPS second stage was replaced by the ESC-A (Etage Supérieur Cryogénique-A), which had a dry weight of 4,540 kg (10,010 lb) and was powered by an HM-7B engine burning 14,900 kg (32,800 lb) of cryogenic propellant. The ESC-A used the liquid oxygen tank and lower structure from the Ariane 4's H10 third stage, mated to a new liquid hydrogen tank. Additionally, the EAP booster casings were lightened with new welds and carry more propellant. The Ariane 5ECA started with a GTO launch capacity of 9,100 kg (20,100 lb) for dual payloads or 9,600 kg (21,200 lb) for a single payload. Later batches: PB+ and PC, increased the max payload to GTO to 11,115 kg (24,504 lb). The Ariane 5 ECA flew 72 times from 2002 to 2019 with one failure and one partial failure.
ECA+	The Ariane 5ECA+ (Evolution Cryotechnique type A+), first successfully flown in 2019, used an improved ESC-D (Etage Supérieur Cryogénique-D).
ES	The Ariane 5ES (Evolution Storable) had an estimated LEO launch capacity of 21,000 kg (46,000 lb). It included all the performance improvements of Ariane 5ECA core and boosters but replaced the ESC-A second stage with the restartable EPS used on Ariane 5GS variants. It was used to launch the Automated Transfer Vehicle (ATV) into a 260 km (160 mi) circular low Earth orbit inclined at 51.6° and was used 3 times to launch 4 Galileo navigation satellites at a time directly into their operational orbit. The Ariane 5ES flew 8 times from 2008 to 2018 with no failures.
ME (cancelled)	The Ariane 5ME (Mid-life Evolution) was under development until December 2014 when funding was cut in favour of developing Ariane 6. Last activities for Ariane 5ME were completed at the end of 2015. Vinci upper stage engine, under development for the 5ME, transferred to Ariane 6.

== Launch pricing and market competition ==
As of November 2014, the Ariane 5 commercial launch price for launching a "midsize satellite in the lower position" was approximately €50 million, competing for commercial launches in an increasingly competitive market.

The heavier satellite was launched in the upper position on a typical dual-satellite Ariane 5 launch and was priced higher than the lower satellite, on the order of €90 million as of 2013.

Total launch price of an Ariane 5 – which could transport up to two satellites to space, one in the "upper" and one in the "lower" positions – was around €150 million as of January 2015.

== Cancelled plans for future developments ==
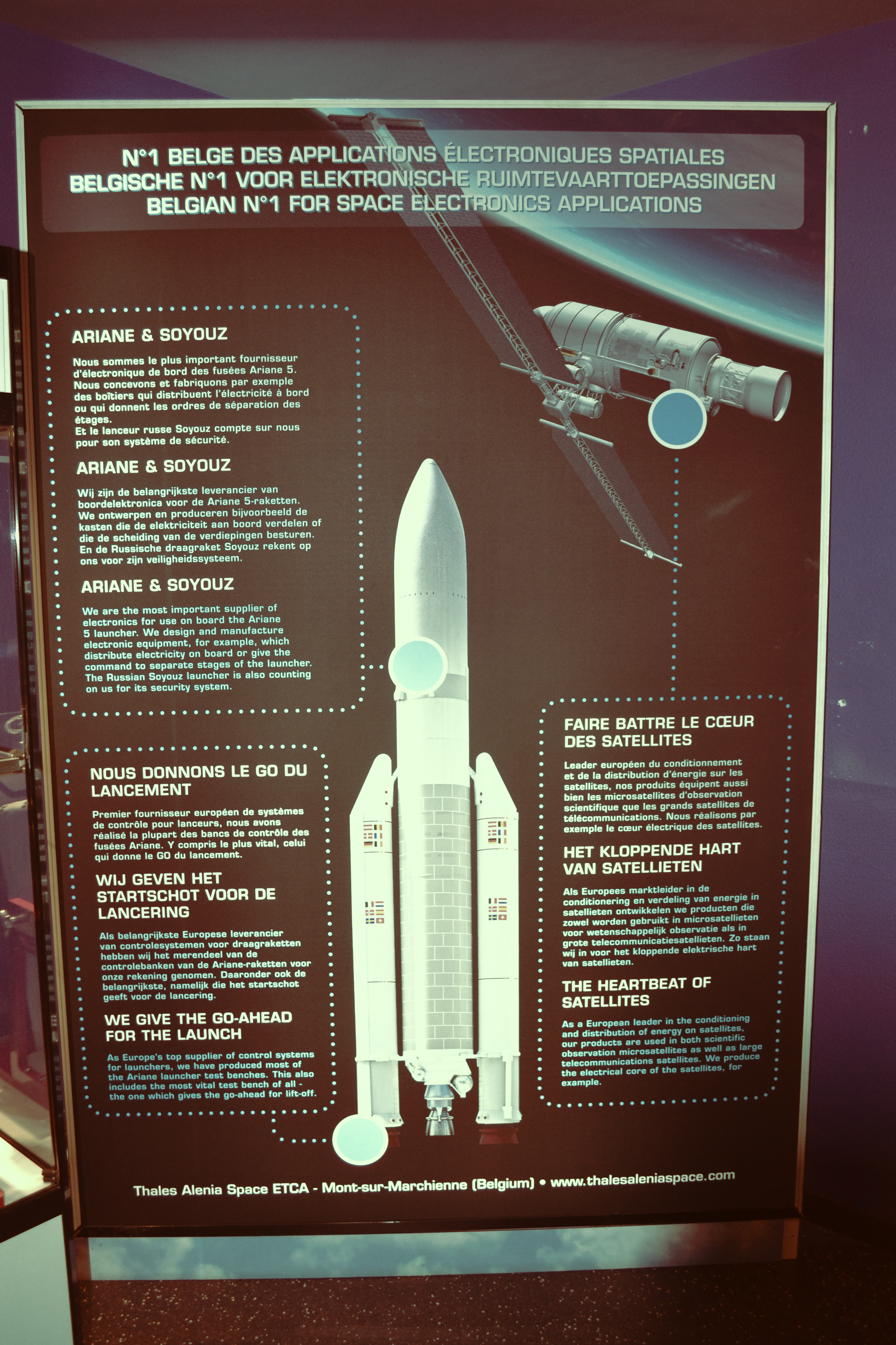
Belgian components produced for the Ariane 5 European heavy-lift launch vehicle explained

=== Ariane 5 ME ===
The Ariane 5 ME (Mid-life Evolution) was in development into early 2015, and was seen as a stopgap between Ariane 5ECA/Ariane 5ES and the new Ariane 6. With first flight planned for 2018, it would have become ESA's principal launcher until the arrival of the new Ariane 6 version. ESA halted funding for the development of Ariane 5ME in late 2014 to prioritize development of Ariane 6.

The Ariane 5ME was to use a new upper stage, with increased propellant volume, powered by the new Vinci engine. Unlike the HM-7B engine, it was to be able to restart several times, allowing for complex orbital maneuvers such as insertion of two satellites into different orbits, direct insertion into geosynchronous orbit, planetary exploration missions, and guaranteed upper stage deorbiting or insertion into graveyard orbit. The launcher was also to include a lengthened fairing up to 20 m (66 ft) and a new dual launch system to accommodate larger satellites. Compared to an Ariane 5ECA model, the payload to GTO was to increase by 15% to 11,500 kg (25,400 lb) and the cost-per-kilogram of each launch was projected to decline by 20%.

==== Development ====
Originally known as the Ariane 5ECB, Ariane 5ME was to have its first flight in 2006. However, the failure of the first ECA flight in 2002, combined with a deteriorating satellite industry, caused ESA to cancel development in 2003. Development of the Vinci engine continued, though at a lower pace. The ESA Council of Ministers agreed to fund development of the new upper stage in November 2008.

In 2009, EADS Astrium was awarded a €200 million contract, and on 10 April 2012 received another €112 million contract to continue development of the Ariane 5ME with total development effort expected to cost €1 billion.

On 21 November 2012, ESA agreed to continue with the Ariane 5ME to meet the challenge of lower priced competitors. It was agreed the Vinci upper stage would also be used as the second stage of a new Ariane 6, and further commonality would be sought. Ariane 5ME qualification flight was scheduled for mid-2018, followed by gradual introduction into service.

On 2 December 2014, ESA decided to stop funding the development of Ariane 5ME and instead focus on Ariane 6, which was expected to have a lower cost per launch and allow more flexibility in the payloads (using two or four P120C solid boosters depending on total payload mass).

=== Solid propellant stage ===
Work on the Ariane 5 EAP motors was continued in the Vega programme. The Vega 1st stage engine – the P80 engine – was a shorter derivation of the EAP. The P80 booster casing was made of filament wound graphite epoxy, much lighter than the current stainless steel casing. A new composite steerable nozzle was developed while new thermal insulation material and a narrower throat improved the expansion ratio and subsequently the overall performance. Additionally, the nozzle had electromechanical actuators which replaced the heavier hydraulic ones used for thrust vector control.

These developments could maybe have made their way back into the Ariane programme, but this was most likely an inference based on early blueprints of the Ariane 6 having a central P80 booster and 2-4 around the main one. The incorporation of the ESC-B with the improvements to the solid motor casing and an uprated Vulcain engine would have delivered 27,000 kg (60,000 lb) to LEO. This would have been developed for any lunar missions but the performance of such a design might not have been possible if the higher Max-Q for the launch of this launch vehicle would have posed a constraint on the mass delivered to orbit.

== Ariane 6 ==
The design brief of the next generation launch vehicle Ariane 6 called for a lower-cost and smaller launch vehicle capable of launching a single satellite of up to 6,500 kg (14,300 lb) to GTO. However, after several permutations the finalized design was nearly identical in performance to the Ariane 5, focusing instead on lowering fabrication costs and launch prices. As of March 2014, Ariane 6 was projected to be launched for about €70 million per flight, about half of the Ariane 5 price.

Initially development of Ariane 6 was projected to cost €3.6 billion. In 2017, the ESA set 16 July 2020 as the deadline for the first flight. The Ariane 6 successfully completed its maiden flight on 9 July 2024.

== Notable launches ==
Launch of the 34th Ariane 5 from Guiana Space Centre

Ariane 5's first test flight (Ariane 5 Flight 501) on 4 June 1996 failed, with the rocket self-destructing 37 seconds after launch because of a malfunction in the control software. A data conversion from 64-bit floating-point value to 16-bit signed integer value to be stored in a variable representing horizontal bias caused a processor trap (operand error) because the floating-point value was too large to be represented by a 16-bit signed integer. The software had been written for the Ariane 4 where efficiency considerations (the computer running the software had an 80% maximum workload requirement) led to four variables being protected with a handler while three others, including the horizontal bias variable, were left unprotected because it was thought that they were "physically limited or that there was a large margin of safety". The software, written in Ada, was included in the Ariane 5 through the reuse of an entire Ariane 4 subsystem despite the fact that the particular software containing the bug, which was just a part of the subsystem, was not required by the Ariane 5 because it has a different preparation sequence than the Ariane 4.

The second test flight (L502, on 30 October 1997) was a partial failure. The Vulcain nozzle caused a roll problem, leading to premature shutdown of the core stage. The upper stage operated successfully, but it could not reach the intended orbit. A subsequent test flight (L503, on 21 October 1998) proved successful and the first commercial launch (L504) occurred on 10 December 1999 with the launch of the XMM-Newton X-ray observatory satellite.

Another partial failure occurred on 12 July 2001, with the delivery of two satellites into an incorrect orbit, at only half the height of the intended GTO. The ESA Artemis telecommunications satellite was able to reach its intended orbit on 31 January 2003, through the use of its experimental ion propulsion system.

The next launch did not occur until 1 March 2002, when the Envisat environmental satellite successfully reached an orbit of 800 km (500 mi) above the Earth in the 11th launch. At 8,111 kg (17,882 lb), it was the heaviest single payload until the launch of the first ATV on 9 March 2008, at 19,360 kg (42,680 lb).

The first launch of the ECA variant on 11 December 2002 ended in failure when a main booster problem caused the rocket to veer off-course, forcing its self-destruction three minutes into the flight. Its payload of two communications satellites (STENTOR and Hot Bird 7), valued at about €630 million, was lost in the Atlantic Ocean. The fault was determined to have been caused by a leak in coolant pipes allowing the nozzle to overheat. After this failure, Arianespace SA delayed the expected January 2003 launch for the Rosetta mission to 26 February 2004, but this was again delayed to early March 2004 due to a minor fault in the foam that protects the cryogenic tanks on the Ariane 5. The failure of the first ECA launch was the last failure of an Ariane 5 until flight 241 in January 2018.

On 27 September 2003, the last Ariane 5G boosted three satellites (including the first European lunar probe, SMART-1), in Flight 162. On 18 July 2004, an Ariane 5G+ boosted what was at the time the heaviest telecommunication satellite ever, Anik F2, weighing almost 6,000 kg (13,000 lb).

The first successful launch of the Ariane 5ECA took place on 12 February 2005. The payload consisted of the XTAR-EUR military communications satellite, a 'SLOSHSAT' small scientific satellite and a MaqSat B2 payload simulator. The launch had been scheduled for October 2004, but additional testing and a military launch (of a Helios 2A observation satellite) delayed the attempt.

On 11 August 2005, the first Ariane 5GS (featuring the Ariane 5ECA's improved solid motors) boosted Thaicom 4, the heaviest telecommunications satellite to date at 6,505 kg (14,341 lb), into orbit.

On 16 November 2005, the third Ariane 5ECA launch (the second successful ECA launch) took place. It carried a dual payload consisting of Spaceway F2 for DirecTV and Telkom-2 for PT Telekomunikasi of Indonesia. This was the launch vehicle's heaviest dual payload to date, at more than 8,000 kg (18,000 lb).

On 27 May 2006, an Ariane 5ECA launch vehicle set a new commercial payload lifting record of 8,200 kg (18,100 lb). The dual-payload consisted of the Thaicom 5 and Satmex 6 satellites.

On 4 May 2007, the Ariane 5ECA set another new commercial record, lifting into transfer orbit the Astra 1L and Galaxy 17 communication satellites with a combined weight of 8,600 kg (19,000 lb), and a total payload weight of 9,400 kg (20,700 lb). This record was again broken by another Ariane 5ECA, launching the Skynet 5B and Star One C1 satellites, on 11 November 2007. The total payload weight for this launch was of 9,535 kg (21,021 lb).

On 9 March 2008, the first Ariane 5ES-ATV was launched to deliver the first ATV called Jules Verne to the International Space Station (ISS). The ATV was the heaviest payload ever launched by a European launch vehicle, providing supplies to the space station with necessary propellant, water, air and dry cargo. This was the first operational Ariane mission which involved an engine restart in the upper stage. The ES-ATV Aestus EPS upper stage was restartable while the ECA HM7-B engine was not.

On 1 July 2009, an Ariane 5ECA launched TerreStar-1 (now EchoStar T1), which was then, at 6,910 kg (15,230 lb), the largest and most massive commercial telecommunication satellite ever built at that time until being overtaken by Telstar 19 Vantage, at 7,080 kg (15,610 lb), launched aboard Falcon 9. The satellite was launched into a lower-energy orbit than a usual GTO, with its initial apogee at roughly 17,900 km (11,100 mi).

On 28 October 2010, an Ariane 5ECA launched Eutelsat's W3B (part of its W Series of satellites) and Broadcasting Satellite System Corporation (B-SAT)'s BSAT-3b satellites into orbit. But the W3B satellite failed to operate shortly after the successful launch and was written off as a total loss due to an oxidizer leak in the satellite's main propulsion system. The BSAT-3b satellite, however, is operating normally.

The VA253 launch on 15 August 2020 introduced two small changes that increased lift capacity by about 85 kg (187 lb); these were a lighter avionics and guidance-equipment bay, and modified pressure vents on the payload fairing, which were required for the subsequent launch of the James Webb Space Telescope. It also debuted a location system using Galileo navigation satellites.

On 25 December 2021, VA256 launched the James Webb Space Telescope towards a Sun–Earth L_{2} halo orbit. The precision of trajectory following launch led to fuel savings credited with potentially doubling the lifetime of the telescope by leaving more hydrazine propellant on board for station-keeping than was expected. According to Rudiger Albat, the program manager for Ariane 5, efforts had been made to select components for this flight that had performed especially well during pre-flight testing, including "one of the best Vulcain engines that we've ever built."

=== GTO payload weight records ===
On 22 April 2011, the Ariane 5ECA flight VA-201 broke a commercial record, lifting Yahsat 1A and Intelsat New Dawn with a total payload weight of 10,064 kg (22,187 lb) to transfer orbit. This record was later broken again during the launch of Ariane 5ECA flight VA-208 on 2 August 2012, lifting a total of 10,182 kg (22,447 lb) into the planned geosynchronous transfer orbit, which was broken again 6 months later on flight VA-212 with 10,317 kg (22,745 lb) sent towards geosynchronous transfer orbit. In June 2016, the GTO record was raised to 10,730 kg (23,660 lb), on the first rocket in history that carried a satellite dedicated to financial institutions. The payload record was pushed a further 5 kg (11 lb), up to 10,735 kg (23,667 lb) on 24 August 2016 with the launch of Intelsat 33e and Intelsat 36. On 1 June 2017, the payload record was broken again to 10,865 kg (23,953 lb) carrying ViaSat-2 and Eutelsat-172B. In 2021 VA-255 put 11,210 kg into GTO.

=== VA241 anomaly ===
On 25 January 2018, an Ariane 5ECA launched SES-14 and Al Yah 3 satellites. About 9 minutes and 28 seconds after launch, a telemetry loss occurred between the launch vehicle and the ground controllers. It was later confirmed, about 1 hour and 20 minutes after launch, that both satellites were successfully separated from the upper stage and were in contact with their respective ground controllers, but that their orbital inclinations were incorrect as the guidance systems might have been compromised. Therefore, both satellites conducted orbital procedures, extending commissioning time. SES-14 needed about 8 weeks longer than planned commissioning time, meaning that entry into service was reported early September instead of July. Nevertheless, SES-14 is still expected to be able to meet the designed lifetime. This satellite was originally to be launched with more propellant reserve on a Falcon 9 launch vehicle since the Falcon 9, in this specific case, was intended to deploy this satellite into a high inclination orbit that would require more work from the satellite to reach its final geostationary orbit. The Al Yah 3 was also confirmed healthy after more than 12 hours without further statement, and like SES-14, Al Yah 3's maneuvering plan was also revised to still fulfill the original mission. As of 16 February 2018, Al Yah 3 was approaching the intended geostationary orbit, after series of recovery maneuvers had been performed. The investigation showed that invalid inertial units' azimuth value had sent the vehicle 17° off course but to the intended altitude, they had been programmed for the standard geostationary transfer orbit of 90° when the payloads were intended to be 70° for this supersynchronous transfer orbit mission, 20° off norme. This mission anomaly ended the 82 consecutive launch success streak from 2003.

== Launch history ==
=== Launch statistics ===
Ariane 5 launch vehicles had accumulated 117 launches, 112 of which were successful, yielding a 95.7% success rate. Between April 2003 and December 2017, Ariane 5 flew 83 consecutive missions without failure, but the launch vehicle suffered a partial failure in January 2018.

=== Rocket configurations ===
- G
- G+
- GS
- ES
- ECA
- ECA+

=== Launch outcomes ===
- Failure
- Partial failure
- Success

=== List of launches ===
All launches are from Guiana Space Centre, ELA-3.

#	Flight no.	Date Time (UTC)	Rocket type Serial no.	Payload	Total payload mass (including launch adapters and SYLDA)	Orbit	Customers	Launch outcome
1	V-88	4 June 1996; 12:34	G 501	Cluster				Failure
1	V-88	Maiden flight of Ariane 5, guidance system failed due to programming error, destroyed by range safety.						
2	V-101	30 October 1997; 13:43	G 502	MaqSat-H, TEAMSAT, MaqSat-B, YES				Partial failure
2	V-101	First Ariane 5 flight to reach orbit. Upper stage underperformed, placed satellites in lower orbit than planned.						
3	V-112	21 October 1998; 16:37	G 503	MaqSat 3, ARD	~6,800 kg	GTO		Success
3	V-112	First fully successful Ariane 5 launch. Contained ARD as a rideshare, designed to test reentry.						
4	V-119	10 December 1999; 14:32	G 504	XMM-Newton	3,800 kg	HEO		Success
4	V-119	Part of Horizon 2000 program, a space telescope designed to perform x-ray astronomy.						
5	V-128	21 March 2000; 23:28	G 505	INSAT-3B; AsiaStar	~5,800 kg	GTO		Success
5	V-128	First Ariane 5 night launch.						
6	V-130	14 September 2000; 22:54	G 506	Astra 2B; GE-7	~4,700 kg	GTO		Success
7	V-135	16 November 2000; 01:07	G 507	PanAmSat-1R; Amsat-P3D; STRV 1C; STRV 1D	~6,600 kg	GTO		Success
8	V-138	20 December 2000; 00:26	G 508	Astra 2D; GE-8; LDREX	~4,700 kg	GTO		Success
9	V-140	8 March 2001; 22:51	G 509	Eurobird-1; BSAT-2a	~5,400 kg	GTO		Success
10	V-142	12 July 2001; 21:58	G 510	Artemis; BSAT-2b	~5,400 kg	GTO (planned); MEO (achieved)		Partial failure
10	V-142	Upper stage underperformed, payloads were placed in an unusable orbit. Artemis was raised to its target orbit at the expense of operational fuel; BSAT-2b was not recoverable.						
11	V-145	1 March 2002; 01:07	G 511	Envisat	8,111 kg	SSO		Success
11	V-145	Earth observation satellite designed to succeed the two European Remote-Sensing Satellites. Largest civilian observation satellite launched.						
12	V-153	5 July 2002; 23:22	G 512	Stellat 5 N-STAR c	~6,700 kg	GTO		Success
13	V-155	28 August 2002; 22:45	G 513	Atlantic Bird 1 MSG-1; MFD	~5,800 kg	GTO		Success
14	V-157	11 December 2002; 22:22	ECA; 517	Hot Bird 7 STENTOR; MFD-A; MFD-B		GTO (planned)		Failure
14	V-157	Maiden flight of Ariane 5ECA, first stage engine failure, rocket destroyed by range safety.						
15	V-160	9 April 2003; 22:52	G 514	INSAT-3A; Galaxy 12	~5,700 kg	GTO		Success
16	V-161	11 June 2003; 22:38	G 515	Optus C1; BSAT-2c	~7,100 kg	GTO		Success
17	V-162	27 September 2003; 23:14	G 516	INSAT-3E eBird-1; SMART-1	~5,600 kg	GTO		Success
17	V-162	Final flight of Ariane 5G						
18	V-158	2 March 2004; 07:17	G+ 518	Rosetta; Philae	3,011 kg	Heliocentric		Success
18	V-158	Maiden flight of Ariane 5G+. Part of the Horizon 2000 program, designed to explore comet 67P/Churyumov–Gerasimenko. First spacecraft to orbit (and with Philae, first to land on) a comet, and first non-NASA spacecraft to reach the outer solar system. First Ariane 5 launch into heliocentric orbit.						
19	V-163	18 July 2004; 00:44	G+ 519	Anik F2	5,950 kg	GTO		Success
20	V-165	18 December 2004; 16:26	G+ 520	Helios 2A; Essaim-1; Essaim-2; Essaim-3; Essaim-4; PARASOL; Nanosat 01	4,200 kg	SSO		Success
20	V-165	Final flight of Ariane 5G+						
21	V-164	12 February 2005; 21:03	ECA; 521	XTAR-EUR; Maqsat-B2; Sloshsat-FLEVO	~8,400 kg	GTO		Success
22	V-166	11 August 2005; 08:20	GS; 523	Thaicom 4	6,485 kg	GTO		Success
22	V-166	Maiden flight of Ariane 5GS						
23	V-168	13 October 2005; 22:32	GS; 524	Syracuse 3A; Galaxy 15	~6,900 kg	GTO		Success
24	V-167	16 November 2005; 23:46	ECA; 522	Spaceway-2; Telkom-2	~9,100 kg	GTO		Success
25	V-169	21 December 2005; 23:33	GS; 525	INSAT-4A; MSG-2	6,478 kg	GTO		Success
26	V-170	11 March 2006; 22:33	ECA; 527	Spainsat; Hot Bird 7A	~8,700 kg	GTO		Success
27	V-171	27 May 2006; 21:09	ECA; 529	Satmex-6; Thaicom 5	9,172 kg	GTO		Success
28	V-172	11 August 2006; 22:15	ECA; 531	JCSAT-10; Syracuse 3B	~8,900 kg	GTO		Success
29	V-173	13 October 2006; 20:56	ECA; 533	DirecTV-9S; Optus D1; LDREX-2	~9,300 kg	GTO		Success
30	V-174	8 December 2006; 22:08	ECA; 534	WildBlue-1; AMC-18	~7,800 kg	GTO		Success
31	V-175	11 March 2007; 22:03	ECA; 535	Skynet 5A; INSAT-4B	~8,600 kg	GTO		Success
32	V-176	4 May 2007; 22:29	ECA; 536	Astra 1L; Galaxy 17	9,402 kg	GTO		Success
33	V-177	14 August 2007; 23:44	ECA; 537	Spaceway-3; BSAT-3a	8,848 kg	GTO		Success
34	V-178	5 October 2007; 22:02	GS; 526	Intelsat 11; Optus D2	5,857 kg	GTO		Success
35	V-179	14 November 2007; 22:03	ECA; 538	Skynet 5B; Star One C1	9,535 kg	GTO		Success
36	V-180	21 December 2007; 21:41	GS; 530	Rascom-QAF1; Horizons-2	~6,500 kg	GTO		Success
37	V-181	9 March 2008; 04:03	ES; 528	Jules Verne ATV		LEO (ISS)		Success
37	V-181	Maiden flight of Ariane 5ES. First flight of the Automated Transfer Vehicle, going to the International Space Station. Made Kourou the third launch site (after Baikonur and Cape Canaveral/KSC) to launch a payload to the ISS.						
38	V-182	18 April 2008; 22:17	ECA; 539	Star One C2; Vinasat-1	7,762 kg	GTO		Success
39	V-183	12 June 2008; 22:05	ECA; 540	Skynet 5C; Türksat 3A	8,541 kg	GTO		Success
40	V-184	7 July 2008; 21:47	ECA; 541	ProtoStar-1; Badr-6	8,639 kg	GTO		Success
41	V-185	14 August 2008; 20:44	ECA; 542	Superbird-7; AMC-21	8,068 kg	GTO		Success
42	V-186	20 December 2008; 22:35	ECA; 543	Hot Bird 9 Eutelsat W2M	9,220 kg	GTO		Success
43	V-187	12 February 2009; 22:09	ECA; 545	Hot Bird 10; NSS-9; Spirale-A; Spirale-B	8,511 kg	GTO		Success
44	V-188	14 May 2009; 13:12	ECA; 546	Herschel Space Observatory; Planck	3,402 kg	Sun–Earth L_{2}		Success
44	V-188	Both part of the Horizon 2000 program, both space telescopes. Herschel designed to perform infrared astronomy, Planck designed to measure the cosmic microwave background.						
45	V-189	1 July 2009; 19:52	ECA; 547	TerreStar-1	7,055 kg	GTO		Success
46	V-190	21 August 2009; 22:09	ECA; 548	JCSAT-12; Optus D3	7,655 kg	GTO		Success
47	V-191	1 October 2009; 21:59	ECA; 549	Amazonas 2 COMSATBw-1	9,087 kg	GTO		Success
48	V-192	29 October 2009; 20:00	ECA; 550	NSS-12; Thor-6	9,462 kg	GTO		Success
49	V-193	18 December 2009; 16:26	GS; 532	Helios 2B	5,954 kg	SSO		Success
49	V-193	Final flight of Ariane 5GS						
50	V-194	21 May 2010; 22:01	ECA; 551	Astra 3B; COMSATBw-2	9,116 kg	GTO	SES; MilSat Services	Success
51	V-195	26 June 2010; 21:41	ECA; 552	Arabsat-5A; Chollian	8,393 kg	GTO	Arabsat; KARI	Success
52	V-196	4 August 2010; 20:59	ECA; 554	Nilesat 201; RASCOM-QAF 1R	7,085 kg	GTO	Nilesat; RASCOM	Success
53	V-197	28 October 2010; 21:51	ECA; 555	Eutelsat W3B; BSAT-3b	8,263 kg	GTO	Eutelsat; Broadcasting Satellite System Corporation	Success
53	V-197	Eutelsat W3B suffered a leak in the propulsion system shortly after launch and was declared a total loss. BSAT-3b is operating normally.						
54	V-198	26 November 2010; 18:39	ECA; 556	Intelsat 17; HYLAS-1	8,867 kg	GTO	Intelsat; Avanti Communications	Success
55	V-199	29 December 2010; 21:27	ECA; 557	Koreasat 6 Hispasat-1E	9,259 kg	GTO	KT Corporation; Hispasat	Success
56	V-200	16 February 2011; 21:50	ES; 544	Johannes Kepler ATV	20,050 kg	LEO (ISS)	ESA	Success
56	V-200	ISS resupply flight.						
57	VA-201	22 April 2011; 21:37	ECA; 558	Yahsat 1A; New Dawn	10,064 kg	GTO	Al Yah Satellite Communications; Intelsat	Success
57	VA-201	Launch was scrubbed from 30 March 2011, aborted in the last seconds before liftoff due to a gimbal malfunction in the Vulcain main engine.						
58	VA-202	20 May 2011; 20:38	ECA; 559	ST-2; GSAT-8	9,013 kg	GTO	Singapore Telecom; ISRO	Success
59	VA-203	6 August 2011; 22:52	ECA; 560	Astra 1N; BSAT-3c / JCSAT-110R	9,095 kg	GTO	SES; Broadcasting Satellite System Corporation	Success
60	VA-204	21 September 2011; 21:38	ECA; 561	Arabsat-5C; SES-2	8,974 kg	GTO	Arab Satellite Communications Organization; SES	Success
61	VA-205	23 March 2012; 04:34	ES; 553	Edoardo Amaldi ATV	20,060 kg	LEO (ISS)	ESA	Success
61	VA-205	ISS resupply flight.						
62	VA-206	15 May 2012; 22:13	ECA; 562	JCSAT-13; Vinasat-2	8,381 kg	GTO	SKY Perfect JSAT; VNPT	Success
63	VA-207	5 July 2012; 21:36	ECA; 563	EchoStar XVII; MSG-3	9,647 kg	GTO	EchoStar; EUMETSAT	Success
64	VA-208	2 August 2012; 20:54	ECA; 564	Intelsat 20; HYLAS 2	10,182 kg	GTO	Intelsat; Avanti Communications	Success
65	VA-209	28 September 2012; 21:18	ECA; 565	Astra 2F; GSAT-10	10,211 kg	GTO	SES; ISRO	Success
66	VA-210	10 November 2012; 21:05	ECA; 566	Eutelsat 21B; Star One C3	9,216 kg	GTO	Eutelsat; Star One	Success
67	VA-211	19 December 2012; 21:49	ECA; 567	Skynet 5D; Mexsat-3	8,637 kg	GTO	Astrium; Mexican Satellite System	Success
68	VA-212	7 February 2013; 21:36	ECA; 568	Amazonas 3 Azerspace-1/Africasat-1a	10,350 kg	GTO	Hispasat; Azercosmos	Success
69	VA-213	5 June 2013; 21:52	ES; 592	Albert Einstein ATV	20,252 kg	LEO (ISS)	ESA	Success
69	VA-213	ISS resupply flight.						
70	VA-214	25 July 2013; 19:54	ECA; 569	Alphasat I-XL; INSAT-3D	9,760 kg	GTO	Inmarsat; ISRO	Success
71	VA-215	29 August 2013; 20:30	ECA; 570	Eutelsat 25B/Es'hail 1 GSAT-7	9,790 kg	GTO	Eutelsat; ISRO	Success
72	VA-217	6 February 2014; 21:30	ECA; 572	ABS-2; Athena-Fidus	10,214 kg	GTO	ABS (satellite operator); DIRISI	Success
73	VA-216	22 March 2014; 22:04	ECA; 571	Astra 5B; Amazonas 4A	9,579 kg	GTO	SES; Hispasat	Success
74	VA-219	29 July 2014; 23:47	ES; 593	Georges Lemaître ATV	20,293 kg	LEO (ISS)	ESA	Success
74	VA-219	ISS resupply flight. Final launch of the Automated Transfer Vehicle.						
75	VA-218	11 September 2014; 22:05	ECA; 573	MEASAT-3b; Optus 10	10,088 kg	GTO	MEASAT Satellite Systems; Optus	Success
76	VA-220	16 October 2014; 21:43	ECA; 574	Intelsat 30; ARSAT-1	10,060 kg	GTO	Intelsat; ARSAT	Success
77	VA-221	6 December 2014; 20:40	ECA; 575	DirecTV-14; GSAT-16	10,210 kg	GTO	DirecTV; ISRO	Success
78	VA-222	26 April 2015; 20:00	ECA; 576	Thor 7 SICRAL-2	9,852 kg	GTO	British Satellite Broadcasting; French Armed Forces	Success
79	VA-223	27 May 2015; 21:16	ECA; 577	DirecTV-15; SKY Mexico 1	9,960 kg	GTO	DirecTV; Sky México	Success
80	VA-224	15 July 2015; 21:42	ECA; 578	Star One C4; MSG-4	8,587 kg	GTO	Star One; EUMETSAT	Success
81	VA-225	20 August 2015; 20:34	ECA; 579	Eutelsat 8 West B Intelsat 34	9,922 kg	GTO	Eutelsat; Intelsat	Success
82	VA-226	30 September 2015; 20:30	ECA; 580	NBN Co 1A; ARSAT-2	10,203 kg	GTO	National Broadband Network; ARSAT	Success
83	VA-227	10 November 2015; 21:34	ECA; 581	Arabsat 6B; GSAT-15	9,810 kg	GTO	Arabsat; ISRO	Success
84	VA-228	27 January 2016; 23:20	ECA; 583	Intelsat 29e	6,700 kg	GTO	Intelsat	Success
85	VA-229	9 March 2016; 05:20	ECA; 582	Eutelsat 65 West A	6,707 kg	GTO	Eutelsat	Success
86	VA-230	18 June 2016; 21:38	ECA; 584	EchoStar 18; BRISat	10,730 kg	GTO	EchoStar; Bank Rakyat Indonesia	Success
86	VA-230	This mission carried the first satellite owned by a financial institution.						
87	VA-232	24 August 2016; 22:16	ECA; 586	Intelsat 33e Intelsat 36	10,735 kg	GTO	Intelsat	Success
87	VA-232	Intelsat 33e's LEROS apogee engine, which supposed to perform orbit raising, failed soon after its successful launch, forcing to use the experimentation of low-thrust reaction control system which extended the commissioning time 3 months longer than expected. Later, it suffered other thruster problems which cut its operational lifetime by about 3.5 years. On 19 October 2024 Intelsat 33e disintegrated in orbit and was declared a total loss by Intelsat.						
88	VA-231	5 October 2016; 20:30	ECA; 585	NBN Co 1B; GSAT-18	10,663 kg	GTO	National Broadband Network; INSAT	Success
89	VA-233	17 November 2016; 13:06	ES; 594	Galileo FOC-M6 (satellites FM-7, 12, 13, 14)	3,290 kg	MEO	ESA	Success
89	VA-233	Part of the Galileo satellite navigation system. First Galileo launch on Ariane 5 and from a launch vehicle besides Soyuz.						
90	VA-234	21 December 2016; 20:30	ECA; 587	Star One D1; JCSAT-15	10,722 kg	GTO	Star One; SKY Perfect JSAT	Success
91	VA-235	14 February 2017; 21:39	ECA; 588	Intelsat 32e / SkyBrasil-1; Telkom-3S	10,485 kg	GTO	Intelsat, DirecTV Latin America; Telkom Indonesia	Success
91	VA-235	This mission carried the first Intelsat Epic^{NG} high-throughput satellite based on the Eurostar E3000 platform, while other Intelsat Epic^{NG} satellites were based on BSS-702MP platform.						
92	VA-236	4 May 2017; 21:50	ECA; 589	Koreasat 7 SGDC-1	10,289 kg	GTO	KT Corporation; SGDC	Success
92	VA-236	The launch was delayed from March 2017 due to transportation to the launch site being restricted by a blockade erected by striking workers.						
93	VA-237	1 June 2017; 23:45	ECA; 590	ViaSat-2; Eutelsat 172B	10,865 kg	GTO	ViaSat; Eutelsat	Success
93	VA-237	Heaviest and most expensive commercial payload ever put into orbit, valued at approximately €675 million (~€844 million including the launch vehicle), until 12 June 2019, when Falcon 9 delivered RADARSAT Constellation with three Canadian satellites, valued almost €844 million (not including the launch vehicle), into orbit. ViaSat-2 suffered antenna glitch, which cut about 15% of its intended throughput.						
94	VA-238	28 June 2017; 21:15	ECA; 591	EuropaSat / Hellas Sat 3 GSAT-17	10,177 kg	GTO	Inmarsat / Hellas Sat; ISRO	Success
95	VA-239	29 September 2017; 21:56	ECA; 5100	Intelsat 37e BSAT-4a	10,838 kg	GTO	Intelsat; B-SAT	Success
95	VA-239	Launch was scrubbed from 5 September 2017 due to electrical fault in one of the solid rocket boosters that caused launch abort in the last seconds before liftoff.						
96	VA-240	12 December 2017; 18:36	ES; 595	Galileo FOC-M7 (satellites FM-19, 20, 21, 22)	3,282 kg	MEO	ESA	Success
96	VA-240	Part of the Galileo satellite navigation system.						
97	VA-241	25 January 2018; 22:20	ECA; 5101	SES-14 with GOLD; Al Yah 3	9,123 kg	GTO	SES, NASA; AlYahsat	Partial failure
97	VA-241	Telemetry from the launch vehicle was lost after 9 minutes 30 seconds into the flight, after launch vehicle trajectory went off course due to invalid inertial units' azimuth value. Satellites later found to have separated from the upper stage and entered an incorrect orbit with large inclination deviations. However, they were able to reach the planned orbit with small loss of on board propellant for SES-14 and still expected to meet the designed lifetime, but with significant loss on Al Yah 3 (up to 50% of its intended operational life).						
98	VA-242	5 April 2018; 21:34	ECA; 5102	Superbird-8 / Superbird-B3; HYLAS-4	10,260 kg	GTO	Japanese MoD, SKY Perfect JSAT; Avanti Communications	Success
98	VA-242	Return-to-flight mission after VA-241 mishap on 25 January 2018.						
99	VA-244	25 July 2018; 11:25	ES; 596	Galileo FOC-M8 (satellites FM-23, 24, 25, 26)	3,379 kg	MEO	ESA	Success
99	VA-244	Final flight of Ariane 5ES. Part of the Galileo satellite navigation system.						
100	VA-243	25 September 2018; 22:38	ECA; 5103	Horizons-3e; Azerspace-2 / Intelsat 38	10,827 kg	GTO	Intelsat, SKY Perfect JSAT; Azercosmos	Success
100	VA-243	Hundredth Ariane 5 mission. Flight VA-243 was delayed from 25 May 2018 due to issues with GSAT-11, which was eventually replaced by Horizons-3e.						
101	VA-245	20 October 2018; 01:45	ECA; 5105	BepiColombo	4,081 kg	Heliocentric	ESA; JAXA	Success
101	VA-245	Part of the Horizon 2000 Plus program, designed to explore Mercury and study its magnetic field, magnetosphere, and composition. Joint mission between ESA and JAXA. First non-NASA spacecraft to visit the planet.						
102	VA-246	4 December 2018; 20:37	ECA; 5104	GSAT-11; GEO-KOMPSAT 2A	10,298 kg	GTO	ISRO; KARI	Success
103	VA-247	5 February 2019; 21:01	ECA; 5106	GSAT-31; SaudiGeoSat-1/HellasSat-4	10,018 kg	GTO	ISRO; Hellas Sat	Success
104	VA-248	20 June 2019; 21:43	ECA; 5107	DirecTV-16; Eutelsat 7C	10,594 kg	GTO	DirecTV; Eutelsat	Success
105	VA-249	6 August 2019; 19:30	ECA+ 5108	EDRS-C / HYLAS-3; Intelsat 39	10,594 kg	GTO	ESA; Avanti Communications; Intelsat	Success
Maiden flight of Ariane 5 ECA+
106	VA-250	26 November 2019; 21:23	ECA; 5109	Inmarsat-5 F5 (GX 5); TIBA-1	10,495 kg	GTO	Inmarsat; Government of Egypt	Success
Final flight of Ariane 5 ECA
107	VA-251	16 January 2020; 21:05	ECA+ 5110	Eutelsat Konnect (African Broadband Satellite); GSAT-30	7,888 kg	GTO	Eutelsat; ISRO	Success
108	VA-252	18 February 2020; 22:18	ECA+ 5111	JCSAT-17; GEO-KOMPSAT 2B	9,236 kg	GTO	SKY Perfect JSAT; KARI	Success
109	VA-253	15 August 2020; 22:04	ECA+ 5112	Galaxy 30; MEV-2; BSAT-4b	10,468 kg including 765 kg of support structures.	GTO	Intelsat; Northrop Grumman; B-SAT	Success
110	VA-254	30 July 2021; 21:00	ECA+ 5113	Eutelsat Quantum; Star One D2	10,515 kg	GTO	Eutelsat; Star One	Success
111	VA-255	24 October 2021; 02:10	ECA+ 5115	SES-17; Syracuse 4A	11,210 kg	GTO	SES; DGA	Success
112	VA-256	25 December 2021; 12:20	ECA+ 5114	James Webb Space Telescope	6,161.4 kg (13,584 lb)	Sun–Earth L_{2}	NASA / ESA / CSA / STScI	Success
112	VA-256	Part of the Large Strategic Science Missions, a space telescope aimed to perform visible light astronomy and infrared astronomy. Joint mission between NASA, ESA, and the CSA. Designed to act as a successor to the Hubble Space Telescope and the Spitzer Space Telescope.						
113	VA-257	22 June 2022; 21:50	ECA+ 5116	MEASAT-3d; GSAT-24	9,829 kg	GTO	MEASAT; NSIL / Tata Play	Success
114	VA-258	7 September 2022; 21:45	ECA+ 5117	Eutelsat Konnect VHTS	6,400 kg	GTO	Eutelsat	Success
115	VA-259	13 December 2022; 20:30	ECA+ 5118	Galaxy 35; Galaxy 36; MTG-I1	10,972 kg	GTO	Intelsat; EUMETSAT	Success
116	VA-260	14 April 2023; 12:14	ECA+ 5120	Jupiter Icy Moons Explorer (JUICE)	5,963 kg	Heliocentric	ESA	Success
116	VA-260	Part of the Cosmic Vision program, designed to explore Jupiter and its moons such as Europa, Ganymede, and Callisto. Complements NASA's Europa Clipper. Slated to be first Non-NASA spacecraft to visit an outer Solar System planet and the first to orbit a moon besides the Moon. Last Ariane 5 flight into heliocentric orbit.						
117	VA-261	5 July 2023; 22:00	ECA+ 5119	Syracuse 4B (Comsat-NG 2); Heinrich Hertz (H2Sat)	7,679.8 kg	GTO	DGA; DLR	Success
117	VA-261	Ariane 5's last mission.						

== See also ==
- List of Ariane launches
- Ariane 6, two initial variants
- Heavy-lift launch vehicle
- Comparison of orbital launcher families
- Comparison of orbital launch systems
- Future Launchers Preparatory Programme (ESA, beyond Ariane 5)
