= Hot Bird 13C =

Communications satellite

Coordinates: 0°0′N 13°00′E

- Names: Hot Bird 9 (2008–2012); Hot Bird 13C (2012–present)
- Mission type: Communication
- Operator: Eutelsat
- COSPAR ID: 2008-065A
- SATCAT no.: 33459
- Mission duration: 15 years

Spacecraft properties
- Manufacturer: EADS Astrium
- Launch mass: 4,880 kilograms (10,760 lb)

Start of mission
- Launch date: 20 December 2008, 22:35:14 UTC
- Rocket: Ariane 5ECA
- Launch site: Kourou ELA-3
- Contractor: Arianespace

Orbital parameters
- Reference system: Geocentric
- Regime: Geostationary

Hot Bird 13C, formerly Hot Bird 9, is a communications satellite operated by Eutelsat, launched 20 December 2008 aboard an Ariane 5ECA carrier rocket along with the Eutelsat W2M spacecraft. It was built by EADS Astrium, based on a Eurostar E3000 satellite bus. It was positioned in geosynchronous orbit at 13°E. After in-orbit testing it will provide communications services to Asia, Europe, Americas, North Africa and the Middle East, with 64 NATO J-band (IEEE K_{u} band) transponders.

The satellite has a mass of 4,880 kilograms, and an expected service life of 15 years. It is identical to the Hot Bird 8 and Hot Bird 10 satellites.
