= STENTOR (satellite) =

French telecommunications satellite

- Names: Satellite de Télécommunications pour Expérimenter les Nouvelles Technologies en Orbite
- Mission type: Technology demonstration, Communications
- Operator: CNES / France Telecom / DGA
- Website: https://cnes.fr/fr
- Mission duration: 9 years (planned); Failed to orbit

Spacecraft properties
- Spacecraft: STENTOR
- Spacecraft type: Spacebus
- Bus: Spacebus-3000B3
- Manufacturer: Alcatel Space (bus); Astrium (avionics)
- Launch mass: 2,210 kg (4,870 lb)
- Dry mass: 1,186 kg (2,615 lb)
- Dimensions: 4.5 x 3.2 x 2.6 m Span: 15.6 m in orbit
- Power: 2.1 kW

Start of mission
- Launch date: 11 December 2002, 22:22 UTC
- Rocket: Ariane 5ECA (V157)
- Launch site: Centre Spatial Guyanais, ELA-3
- Contractor: Arianespace
- Entered service: Failed to orbit

Orbital parameters
- Reference system: Geocentric orbit (planned)
- Regime: Geostationary orbit
- Longitude: 11° West

Transponders
- Band: 7 transponders: 6 Ku-band; 1 EHF transponder
- Coverage area: Europe, France

STENTOR (Satellite de Télécommunications pour Expérimenter les Nouvelles Technologies en Orbite) was a French communications satellite which was lost in a launch failure in 2002. Intended for operation by CNES, France Telecom, and Direction générale de l'armement (DGA). To validate, in flight, advanced technologies which would be integrated in the next generation of telecommunications spacecraft. It was intended to also demonstrate new telecommunications services, including broadband and multimedia transmissions to small user terminals.

== Satellite description ==
STENTOR was constructed by Alcatel Space (bus), and Astrium (avionics) was based on the Spacebus-3000B3 satellite bus. It had a mass of 2,210 kg (4,870 lb) and was expected to have an operational lifespan of 9 years. The spacecraft was equipped with 6 Ku-band transponders, plus 1 Extremely high frequency (EHF) transponder. It would have broadcast in Europe and France.

== Launch ==
Arianespace was contracted to launch STENTOR on the maiden flight of the Ariane 5ECA launch vehicle, an upgraded version of the Ariane 5 intended to offer increased payload capacity to Geostationary transfer orbit (GTO). The STENTOR technology demonstration satellite, to have been operated by the French space agency CNES, was aboard the launch vehicle. The launch took place from ELA-3 at Centre Spatial Guyanais, at Kourou, in French Guiana, at 22:22 UTC on 11 December 2002, bound for Geostationary transfer orbit (GTO).

Around three minutes after liftoff, performance issues with the first stage's Vulcain 2 engine — which was making its first flight — began to be noted. By the time of fairing separation, 183 seconds into the flight, the rocket was tumbling out of control. It began to lose altitude and speed, before being destroyed by range safety officer 456 seconds after launch. The failure was attributed to an engine cooling problem which developed around 96 seconds into the mission, causing the engine to destroy itself. Due to the failure the next Ariane 5 launch, which had been scheduled to carry the European Space Agency's (ESA) Rosetta spacecraft in January 2003, was delayed - causing Rosetta to miss its launch window for a mission to comet 46P/Wirtanen. Rosetta was subsequently retargeted to 67P/Churyumov–Gerasimenko and launched successfully in 2004.
