= Hot Bird 13B =

Communications satellite

- Names: Hot Bird 8 (2006–2012); Hot Bird 13B (2012–2023); Eutelsat Hot Bird 13B
- Mission type: Communications
- Operator: Eutelsat
- COSPAR ID: 2006-032A
- SATCAT no.: 29270
- Website: www.eutelsat.com/en/satellites/the-fleet/EUTELSAT-HB13B.html
- Mission duration: 15 years (planned)

Spacecraft properties
- Spacecraft: Hot Bird 8
- Spacecraft type: Eurostar (satellite bus)
- Bus: Eurostar-3000
- Manufacturer: EADS Astrium
- Launch mass: 4,875 kg (10,748 lb)
- Power: 14 kW

Start of mission
- Launch date: 4 August 2006, 21:48:00 UTC
- Rocket: Proton-M / Briz-M
- Launch site: Baikonur, Site 200/39
- Contractor: Khrunichev State Research and Production Space Center
- Entered service: October 2006

Orbital parameters
- Reference system: Geocentric orbit
- Regime: Geostationary orbit
- Longitude: 13° East

Transponders
- Band: 64 Ku-band
- Coverage area: Europe, North Africa, Middle East

Hot Bird 13B, known as Hot Bird 8 prior to 2012, is a geostationary communications satellite. Operated by Eutelsat, it provides direct-to-home (DTH) broadcasting services from geostationary orbit as part of Eutelsat's Hot Bird constellation at a longitude of 13° East.

== Satellite description ==
Eutelsat and EADS Astrium announced in September 2003 the signature of a contract for the construction the Hot Bird 8 broadcast satellite. Hot Bird 8 was constructed by EADS Astrium, and is based on the Eurostar-3000 satellite bus. It has a mass of 4,875 kg (10,748 lb) and is expected to operate for 15 years. The spacecraft has 64 Ku-band transponders, broadcasting satellite television and radio to Europe, North Africa, and the Middle East.

== Launch ==
Hot Bird 8, as it was then named, was launched by a Proton-M launch vehicle with a Briz-M upper stage. The launch took place from Site 200/39 at the Baikonur Cosmodrome, at 21:48:00 UTC on 4 August 2006 with spacecraft separation occurring at 06:59:20 UTC on 5 August 2006. The launch was conducted by International Launch Services. The spacecraft was deployed into geosynchronous transfer orbit, raising itself to its operational geostationary position at 13° East by means of its apogee motor. The spacecraft is co-located with Hot Bird 13C and Hot Bird 13D.
