= INSAT-4CR =

Indian communications satellite

- Mission type: Communications
- Operator: INSAT
- COSPAR ID: 2007-037A
- SATCAT no.: 32050
- Website: http://www.isro.org/satellites/insat-4cr.aspx
- Mission duration: Planned: 12 years Achieved: 13 years, 2 months, 22 days

Spacecraft properties
- Bus: I-2K
- Manufacturer: ISRO
- Launch mass: 2,168 kilograms (4,780 lb)
- Power: 3000 W

Start of mission
- Launch date: 2 September 2007, 12:51 UTC
- Rocket: GSLV Mk.I F04
- Launch site: Satish Dhawan SLP

End of mission
- Disposal: Moved to a graveyard orbit
- Deactivated: 24 November 2020

Orbital parameters
- Reference system: Geocentric
- Regime: Geostationary
- Longitude: 48°E (10 Feb 2017 to 24 Nov 2020); 74°E (till 12 Jan 2017)
- Perigee altitude: 35,026 kilometres (21,764 mi)
- Apogee altitude: 36,235 kilometres (22,515 mi)
- Inclination: 0.15 degrees
- Period: 1,428.12 minutes
- Epoch: 14 September 2007

Transponders
- Band: 12 Ku band
- Coverage area: India
- TWTA power: 140 watts
- EIRP: 51.5 decibel-watts

INSAT-4CR was a communications satellite operated by ISRO as part of the Indian National Satellite System. Launched in September 2007, it replaced the INSAT-4C satellite which had been lost in a launch failure the previous year. The satellite was initially stationed in geostationary orbit at a longitude of 74 degrees east, with expected operational life of at least ten years, however this may have been reduced by the underperformance of the Geosynchronous Satellite Launch Vehicle which placed it into orbit. INSAT-4CR is planned to be replaced by GSAT-31, which was launched on February 6, 2019.

== Spacecraft ==
INSAT-4CR was constructed by ISRO, and is based around the I-2K satellite bus. A 2,168-kilogram (4,780 lb) spacecraft, it is equipped with twelve K_{u} band transponders operating at a frequency of 36 MHz, with 140 Watt travelling wave tube amplifiers. The satellite has an effective isotropic radiated power of 51.5 dBW. An additional K_{u} band signal is used as a beacon for tracking.

INSAT-4CR operated in a geostationary orbit at a longitudes of 74° East and 48° East, providing communications to India. Broadcasting capacity on INSAT-4CR was allocated to Airtel Digital TV and Sun Direct DTH. At launch, the satellite was carrying 1,218 kilograms (2,685 lb) of fuel, for raising itself into geostationary orbit, and subsequently operating there for a planned twelve years. Increased expenditure of fuel reaching geostationary orbit, due to launch underperformance, may have resulted in a loss of up to five years of operational life.

== Launch ==
INSAT-4CR was launched on 2 September 2007 by the fifth flight of the Geosynchronous Satellite Launch Vehicle, GSLV-F04. The launch occurred at 12:51 UTC on 2 September 2007. The third stage of the carrier rocket underperformed, resulting in the satellite being placed into a lower than planned orbit.

As a result of the underperformance during its launch, INSAT-4CR had to expend maneuvering and station keeping propellant to raise its orbit by more than had originally been planned. It was subsequently reported by Indian news agencies that ISRO had lost track of the satellite's orbit, and could not locate the spacecraft until NASA identified it several days later, however, ISRO denied these claims. As a result of these failures, the operational lifetime of the satellite was reportedly decreased by up to five years.

== End of life and replacement ==
Towards the end of its service life INSAT-4CR was relocated from 74°E to 48°E slot on 10 February 2017 where it stayed until being retired and placed into graveyard orbit on 24 November 2020. Services of INSAT-4CR were handed over to GSAT-31.
