= INSAT-3C =

Indian telecommunications satellite

INSAT 3C
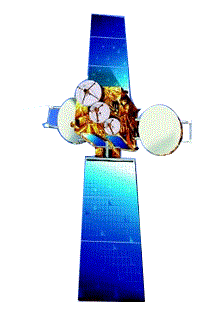
- Mission type: Communications; Weather
- Operator: INSAT
- COSPAR ID: 2002-002A
- SATCAT no.: 27298
- Website: INSAT 3C

Spacecraft properties
- Bus: I-2K
- Manufacturer: ISRO
- Launch mass: 2,750 kg (6,060 lb)
- Dry mass: 1,210 kg (2,670 lb)
- Power: 2.765 kilowatts

Start of mission
- Launch date: 23 January 2002, 23:46:57 UTC
- Rocket: Ariane-42L H10-3
- Launch site: Kourou ELA-3
- Contractor: Arianespace

Orbital parameters
- Reference system: Geocentric
- Regime: Geostationary
- Longitude: 74° East (0°N +74°E)
- Inclination: 4 degrees
- Period: 24 hours

INSAT-3C is a multipurpose satellite built by ISRO and launched by Arianespace in Jan 2002. INSAT-3C is the second satellite of the INSAT-3 series. All the transponders provide coverage over India. Insat-3C is controlled from the Master Control Facility at Hassan in Karnataka. It will provide voice, video and digital data services to India and neighboring countries.

== Launch ==
INSAT 3C was launched by the Ariane 4 launch vehicle of Arianespace at 5:17 am IST from Kourou, French Guiana in South America. INSAT-3C was placed into a Geo-synchronous Transfer Orbit (GTO), 21 minutes after the lift-off, in a 3-axis stabilised mode, with a perigee of 570 km and an apogee of 35,920 km and an inclination of 4° with respect to the equator. After 4 maneuvers INSAT-3C has been put in its final three-axis stabilised mode on February 1, 2002. The orbit rising maneuvers were carried out in phases by firing the 440 Newton Liquid Apogee Motor(LAM). The satellite carried about 1.5 tonne of propellant (MMH (MonoMethylHydrazine) and MON-3 (Mixed Oxides of Nitrogen)) for orbit raising operations as well as for station keeping and in-orbit attitude control.INSAT-3C like all of its predecessors in the INSAT series has a 3-axis body stabilized spacecraft using momentum/reaction wheels Earth sensors, Sun sensors, inertial reference unit and magnetic torquers. It is equipped with unified bi-propellant thrusters.

== Payload ==
INSAT-3C, carrying Fixed Satellite Services (FSS) transponders, Broadcast Satellite Services (BSS) transponders & Mobile Satellite Services (MSS) transponders is intended to continue the service of INSAT-2DT and INSAT-2C which were nearing their end to life besides enhancing and augmenting the INSAT system capacity.

- 24 Normal C-band transponders providing an EIRP of 37 dBW
- 6 Extended C-band transponders with EIRP of 37 dBW
- 2 S-band transponders to provide BSS services with 42 dBW EIRP
- 1 MSS transponder operating in S-band up-link and C-band downlink

The satellite was designed for operations near 74 deg Longitude.
