= GSAT-16 =

Indian communication satellite

- Mission type: Communication
- Operator: ISRO
- COSPAR ID: 2014-078A
- SATCAT no.: 40332
- Mission duration: 12 years (estimated)

Spacecraft properties
- Bus: I-3K
- Manufacturer: ISRO Satellite Centre; Space Applications Centre
- Launch mass: 3,100 kilograms (6,800 lb)
- Power: 5.6 kW solar

Start of mission
- Launch date: 6 December 2014, 20:40 UTC
- Rocket: Ariane 5 ECA
- Launch site: Kourou ELA-3
- Contractor: Arianespace

Orbital parameters
- Reference system: Geocentric
- Regime: Geostationary
- Longitude: 55° East

Transponders
- Band: 12 K_{u} band; 24 C band; 12 Extended C band
- Bandwidth: 36 MHz

GSAT-16 is the 11th Indian communication satellite, meant to increase the number of transponders available for satellite-based telecommunication, television, and VSAT services in India. GSAT-16 is similar to GSAT-15 with each satellite weighing 3,150 kg and having power generation capacity of 6.8 kW.

== Launch ==
Initially launch was planned for 4 December 2014, but was postponed due to inclement weather. GSAT-16 was finally launched on 6 December 2014 from the Guiana Space Centre, French Guiana, by an Ariane 5 rocket.

== Payload ==
The satellite is equipped with 12 ku, 24 C and 12 Extended C band transponders. The satellite also has the highest Indian ku-beacon transmitter.

== Satellite ==
GSAT-16 will be the 11th among GSAT series of Indian communication satellites, and will have estimated lifespan of 12 years. It will support civil aviation services apart from backing up the services provided by other communication satellites. The satellite is aimed as a replacement for satellite INSAT-3E

== Cost ==
The satellite was insured for ₹865 crore. The Department of Space had approved ₹800 crore for the satellite in financial year 2013–14.

== See also ==
- Indian Regional Navigational Satellite System
- Global Navigation Satellite System
- GPS
- GSAT
