= Intelsat 28 =

Communications satellite broadcasting to Africa

- Mission type: Communications
- Operator: Intelsat
- COSPAR ID: 2011-016A
- SATCAT no.: 37392
- Mission duration: 15 years (planned); 12 years (expected)

Spacecraft properties
- Bus: Star-2.4
- Manufacturer: Orbital Sciences
- Launch mass: 3,000 kilograms (6,600 lb)

Start of mission
- Launch date: 22 April 2011, 21:37 UTC
- Rocket: Ariane 5ECA VA201 (558)
- Launch site: Kourou ELA-3
- Contractor: Arianespace

Orbital parameters
- Reference system: Geocentric
- Regime: Geostationary
- Longitude: 33 east
- Perigee altitude: 35,787 kilometres (22,237 mi)
- Apogee altitude: 35,796 kilometres (22,243 mi)
- Inclination: 0.00 degrees
- Period: 23.93 hours
- Epoch: 28 October 2013, 23:15:47 UTC

Intelsat 28, formerly New Dawn, is a communications satellite operated by Intelsat, and positioned in geosynchronous orbit at 33 degrees east, serving TV and broadband communications to Africa.

Intelsat 28 was built by Orbital Sciences Corporation, and is based on the STAR-2 satellite platform. Following its launch in 2011, one of its antennas failed to deploy, prevented use of part of the C-band payload, limiting the spacecraft's operational lifespan.
