= INSAT-1D =

Satellite

INSAT-1D (Full name: Indian National Satellite - 1D)
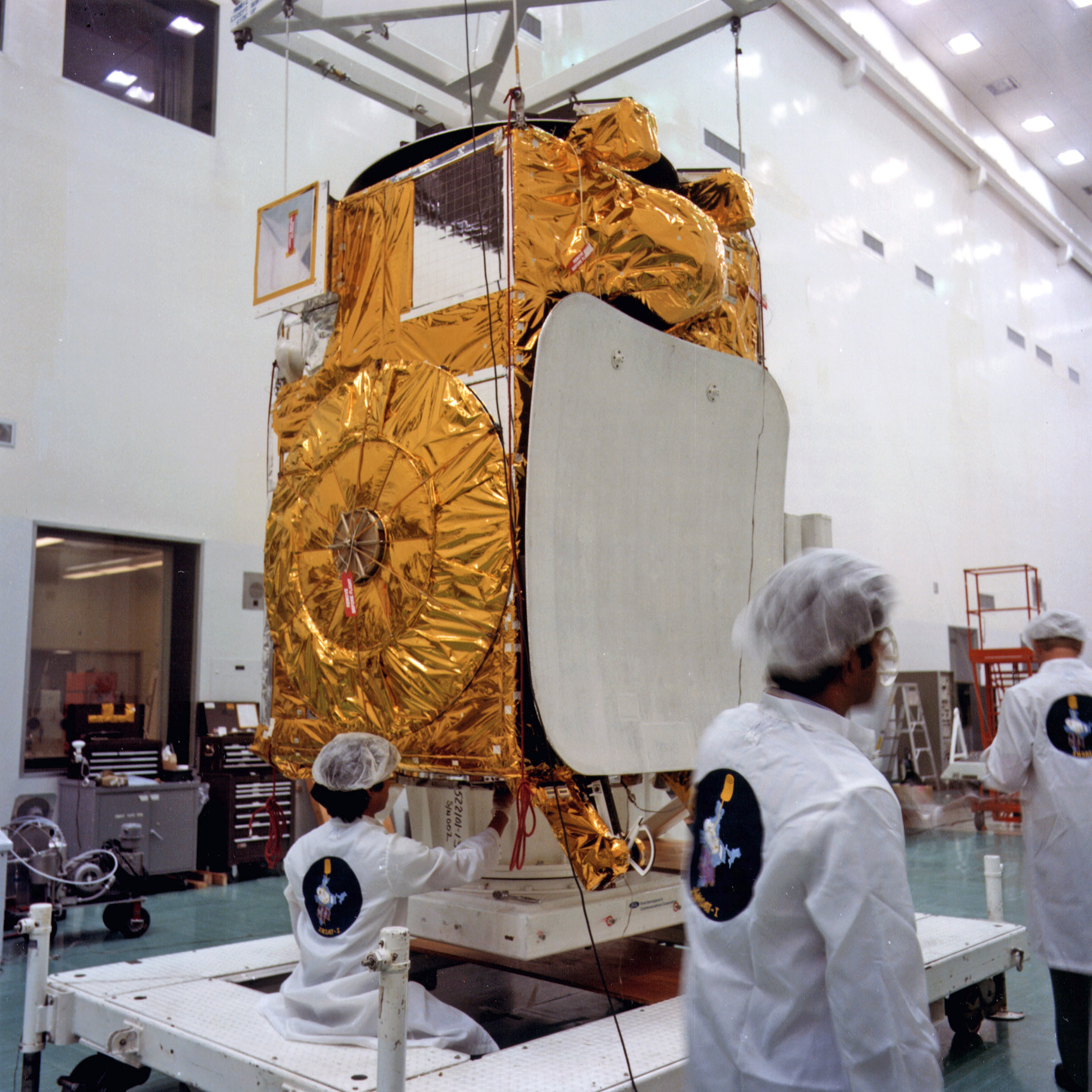
- Mission type: Communications, Cloud Observation
- Operator: INSAT
- COSPAR ID: 1990-051A
- SATCAT no.: 20643
- Mission duration: 7 years

Spacecraft properties
- Spacecraft type: INSAT-1
- Manufacturer: Ford Aerospace
- Launch mass: 1,190 kilograms (2,620 lb) (Lift - off Mass)
- Dry mass: 550 kilograms (1,210 lb)
- Power: 1000 W (Solar array); Nominal Power: 1200.0 W

Start of mission
- Launch date: June 12, 1990, 05:52:00 UTC
- Rocket: Delta 4925
- Launch site: Cape Canaveral LC-17B
- Contractor: NASA
- Deployment date: UTC

End of mission
- Disposal: Decommissioned (mission life over)
- Deactivated: 14 May 2002

Orbital parameters
- Reference system: Geocentric
- Regime: Geostationary
- Longitude: 83° east
- Semi-major axis: 42,164.88 kilometres (26,200.04 mi)
- Eccentricity: 0.0012393
- Perigee altitude: 35,741 kilometres (22,208 mi)
- Apogee altitude: 35,846 kilometres (22,274 mi)
- Inclination: 14.30 degrees
- Period: 23.93 hours
- Epoch: 14 November 2013, 15:52:38 UTC

INSAT-1D was 4th and the concluding multipurpose geostationary satellite of INSAT-1 (first generation Indian National Satellite) series. It was launched on June 12, 1990.

== Importance of INSAT-1D satellite ==
Similar to all other INSAT systems, INSAT-1D was also a joint venture of DOS (Department of Space), DOT (Department of Telecommunications), IMD (Indian Meteorological Department), AIR (All India Radio). The objectives of INSAT-1D were meteorological observations over India and the Indian Ocean, and search & rescue services, domestic telecommunications (nationwide direct TV broadcasting, TV program distribution, meteorological data distribution, etc.). Meteorological Data Utilization Center (MDUC, at Delhi), under IMD, was authorized for the dissemination and distribution of INSAT meteorological images and ancillary data. Master Control Facility of DOS was decided to take responsibility for the operation of the INSAT space segment.

But the success of this launch meant a lot to India - a country that was setting up own national computer networks. Relying on a lot of communication circuits, microwave, coaxial and fibre-optic telecommunication links throughout the country causes a huge problem; and thus the Indian Space Research Organisation (ISRO) planned at the start of the INSAT-1 series to always have at least two satellites in space to meet the increasing demand of telecommunication links for India's civilian community. INSAT-1A and INSAT-1C had already faced immature death and their plans had suffered a serious setback. Another satellite INSAT-1B, launched in 1983 had already exceeded its planned seven year working life.

== Launch ==
INSAT 1D was built by Ford Aerospace (now Loral Inc) for the Indian National Satellite System. Initially, the launch was scheduled on 29 June 1989. Unfortunately, 10 days before that, during launch preparation, a launch pad hoist cable broke and a crane hook fell on it damaging its C-band reflector. The fully insured satellite was repaired by Ford Aerospace at a reported cost of $10 million. But that mishap was followed solar panel damage of cost $150,000 suffered during the 1989 San Francisco earthquake. The satellite was finally Delta-launched from Cape Canaveral, United States. It had a 7-year life expectancy.

== Structure ==
The satellite was box-shaped, measuring 2.18 × 1.55 × 1.42 metres (7.2 × 5.1 × 4.7 ft). A solar sail and 11.5-square-metre (124 sq ft) solar panel extended overall length to 19.4 m (64 ft) when deployed. It was housed 12 C-band transponders for telephone and data communications and two S-band transponders for direct broadcast service. A very high resolution radiometer (VHRR) was installed for meteorological imagery for long-term weather forecasting, storm warning and resource management.

INSAT-1D played a vital role in replacing INSAt-1B. Moreover, at that moment India already had hired Arabsat's 12 transponders at high cost (the rate of $800,000 per transponder per year). Failure of 1D mission would compel the government to hire more transponders.

== See also ==
- Indian Space Research Organisation
- INSAT-1A
- INSAT-1B
- INSAT-1C
- 1990 in spaceflight
- List of Indian satellites
