= Guion Bluford =

First African-American in space (born 1942)

Guion Stewart Bluford
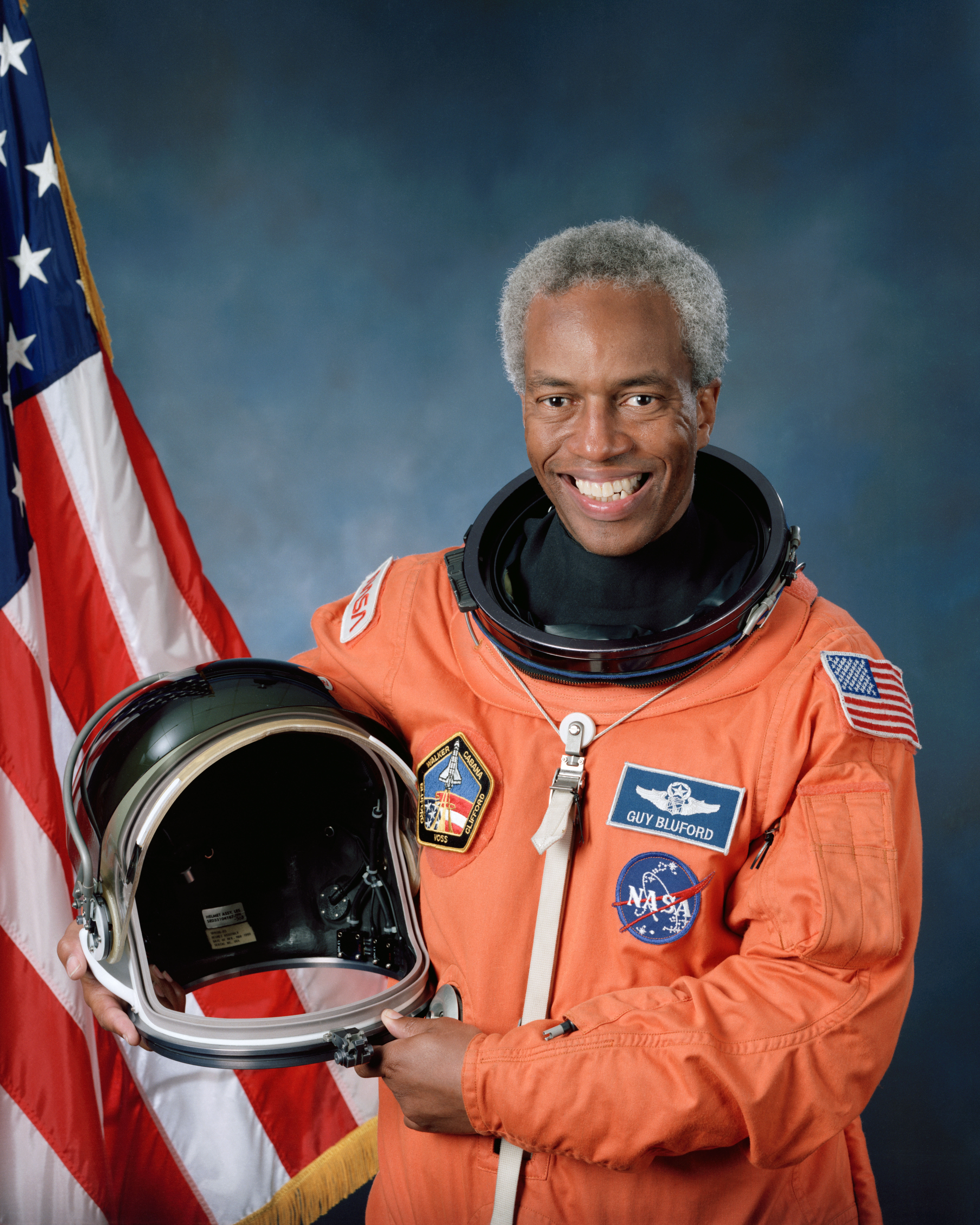
- Official portrait, 1992
- Born: Guion Stewart Bluford Jr. November 22, 1942 (age 83); Philadelphia, Pennsylvania, U.S.
- Education: Pennsylvania State University (BS); Air University (MS, PhD); University of Houston (MBA)
- Space career

NASA astronaut
- Rank: Colonel, USAF
- Time in space: 28d 16h 33m
- Selection: NASA Group 8 (1978)
- Mission: STS-8; STS-61-A; STS-39; STS-53
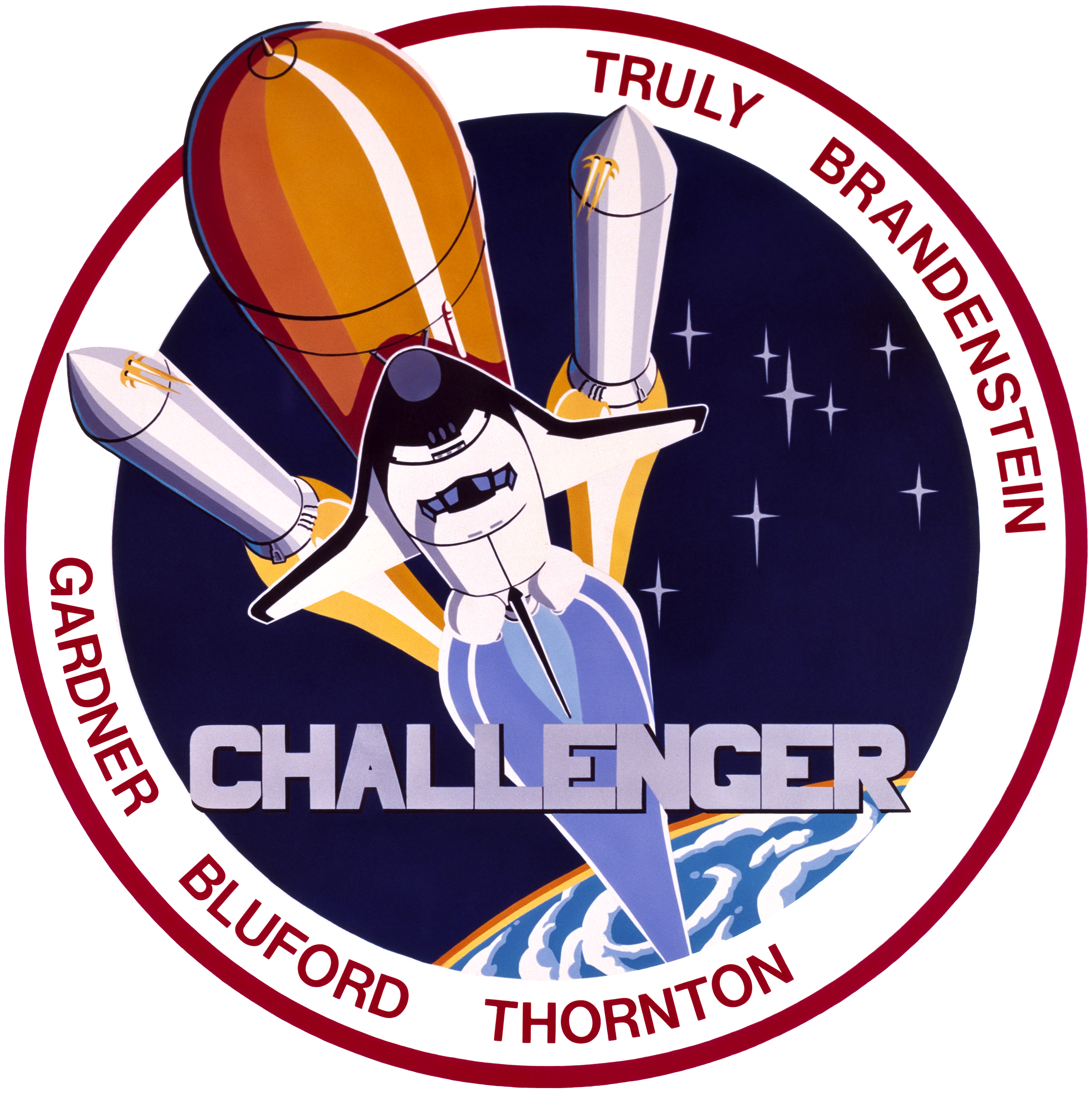
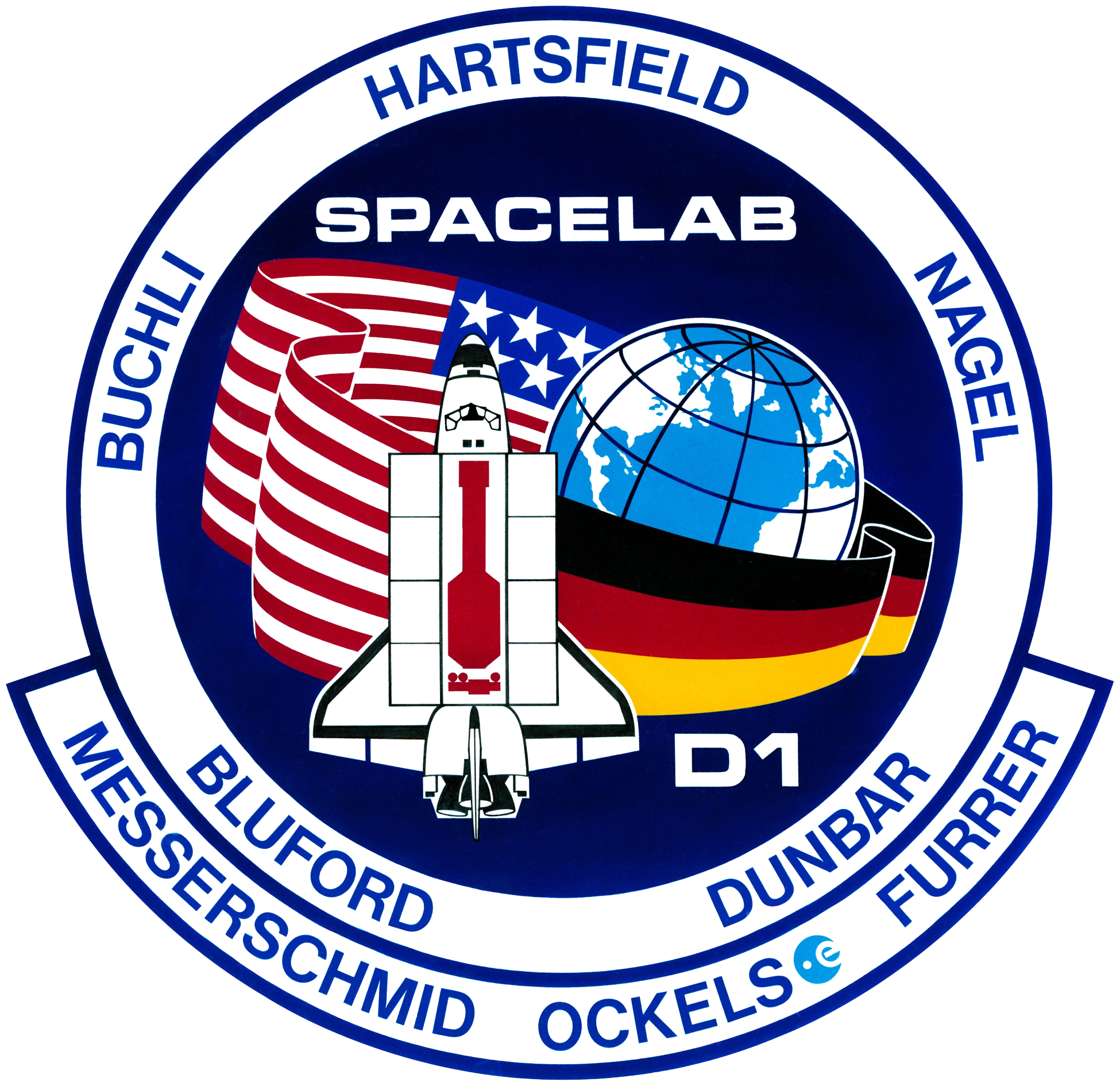
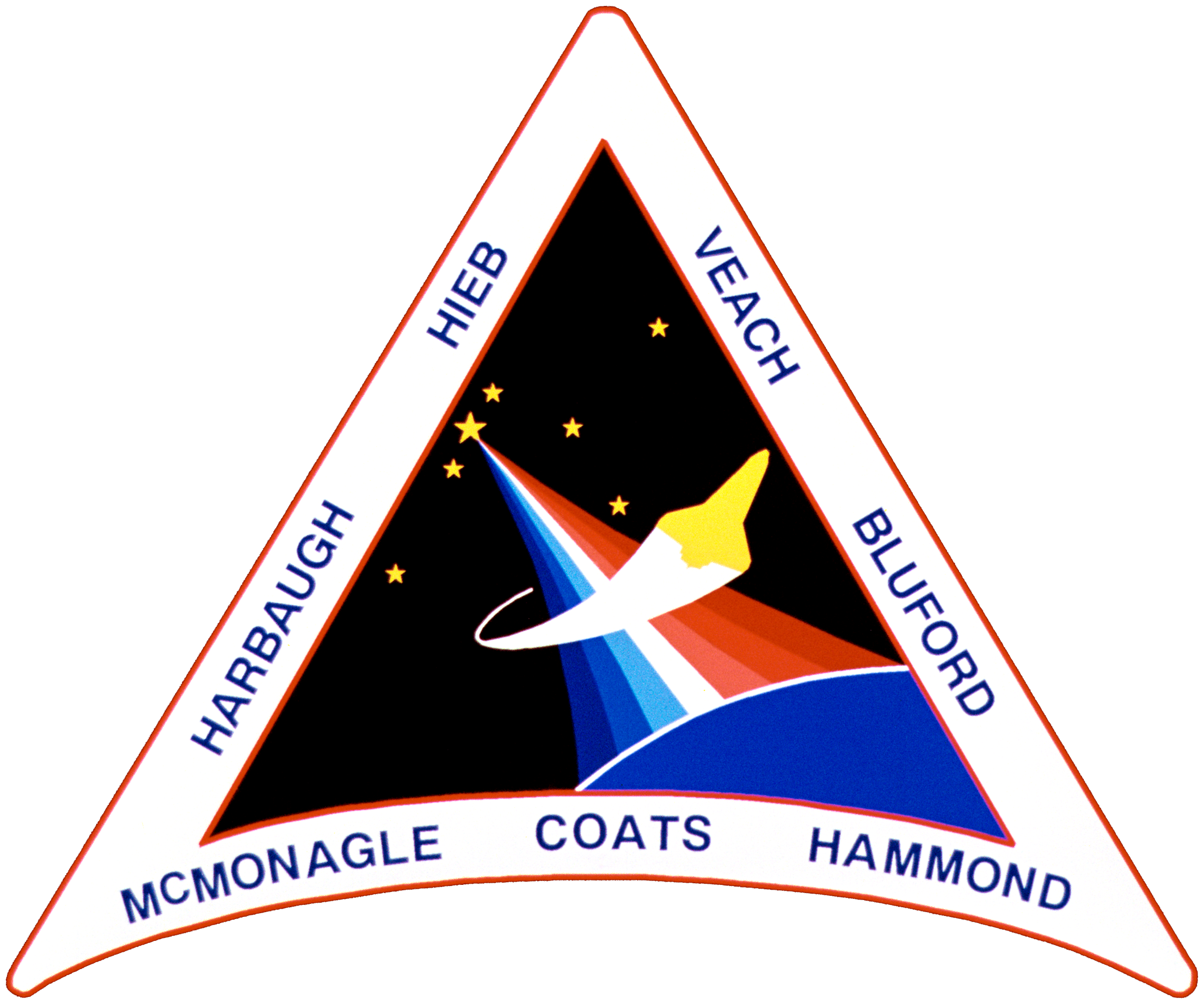
- Mission insignia

Guion Stewart Bluford Jr. (born November 22, 1942) is an American aerospace engineer, retired United States Air Force (USAF) officer and fighter pilot, and former NASA astronaut, in which capacity he became the first African American to go to space. (Note: Robert Henry Lawrence Jr. was the first African American selected as an astronaut but did not go to space.) While assigned to NASA, he remained a USAF officer rising to the rank of colonel. He participated in four Space Shuttle flights between 1983 and 1992. In 1983, as a member of the crew of the Orbiter Challenger on the mission STS-8, he became the first African American to fly in space. He is also the first African American to return to space for a second, third, and fourth time. He is the first African American to be awarded NASA's coveted Gold Astronaut Pin and the United States Air Force Command Pilot Astronaut Wings. He was inducted into the International Space Hall of Fame in 1997, the U. S. Astronaut Hall of Fame in 2010, and the National Aviation Hall of Fame in 2019.

== Personal life ==
Born in Philadelphia, Bluford graduated from Overbrook High School in 1960. He received a Bachelor of Science degree in Aerospace Engineering from the Pennsylvania State University in 1964, a Master of Science degree with distinction in Aerospace Engineering from the Air Force Institute of Technology (AFIT) in 1974, a Doctor of Philosophy degree in Aerospace Engineering with a minor in laser physics, again from AFIT, in 1978, and a Master of Business Administration degree from the University of Houston–Clear Lake in 1987. He has also attended the Wharton School of Business of the University of Pennsylvania.

His hobbies include reading, swimming, jogging, racquetball, handball, scuba diving and golf. He married Linda Tull in 1964 and has two sons.

== Air Force career ==
Bluford attended pilot training at Williams Air Force Base, and received his pilot wings in January 1966. He then went to F4C combat crew training in Arizona and Florida and was assigned to the 557th Tactical Fighter Squadron, Cam Ranh Bay, Vietnam. He flew 144 combat missions, 65 of which over North Vietnam. In July 1967, he was assigned to the 3630th Flying Training Wing, Sheppard Air Force Base, Texas as a T-38A instructor pilot, training future United States Air Force and West German fighter pilots as part of the Euro-NATO Joint Pilot Training Program. Bluford was a standardization/evaluation officer and an assistant flight commander. He was also an executive support officer to the Deputy Wing Commander of Operations when he was selected for graduate school. After graduating from the Air Force Institute of Technology in 1974, Bluford was assigned to the Air Force Flight Dynamics Laboratory, Wright-Patterson Air Force Base as Deputy for Advanced Concepts for the Aeromechanics Division and then Branch Chief of the Laboratory's Aerodynamics and Airframe Branch. He has written and presented several scientific papers in computational fluid dynamics.

He has flown 688 hours in space and has logged over 5,200 hours of jet flight time in the T-33, T-37, T-38, F-4C, F-15, U-2/TR-1, and F-5A/B aircraft, including 1,300 hours as a T-38 instructor pilot. He also has an FAA commercial pilot license and is a certified scuba diver with over 50 open water dives.

== NASA career ==
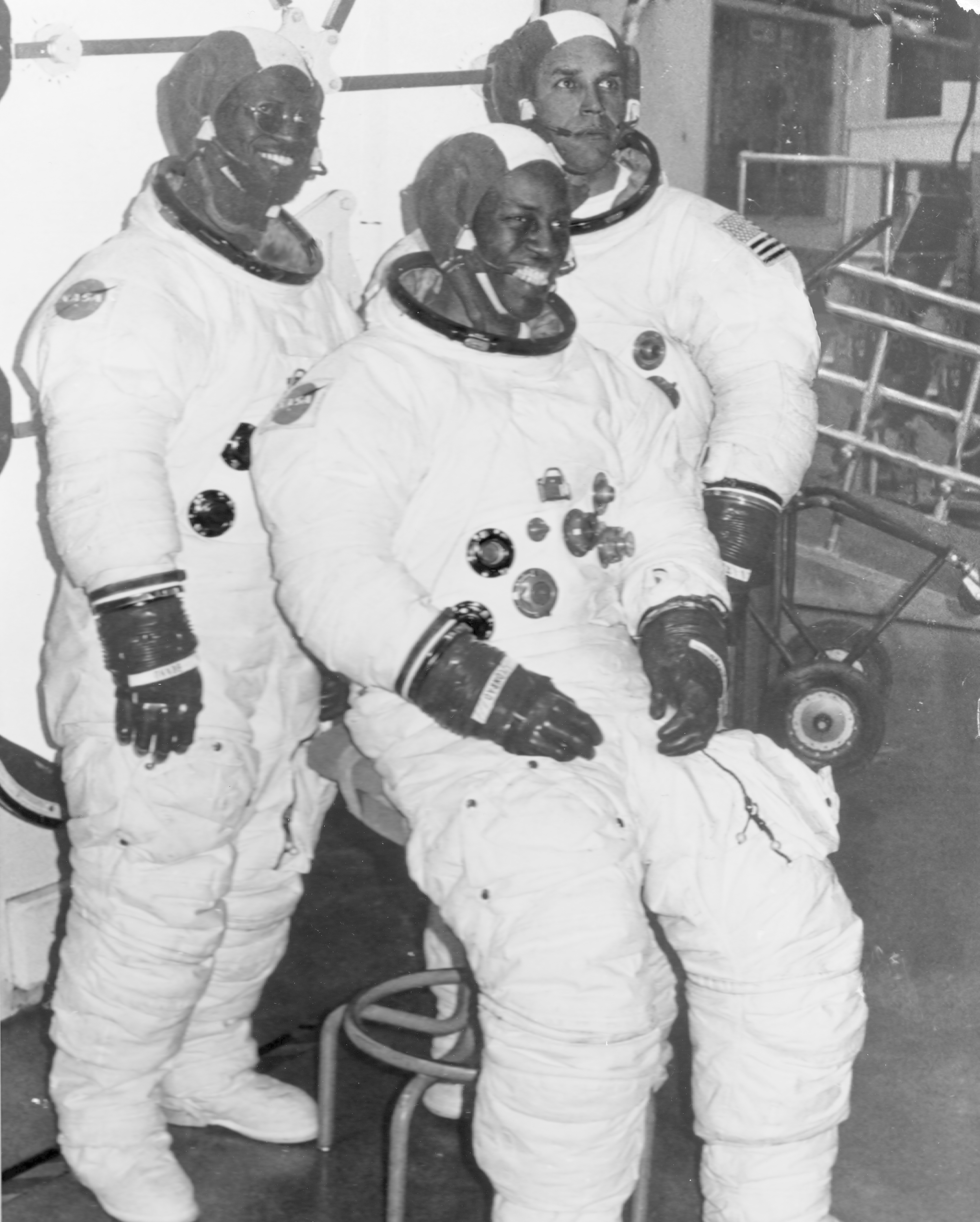
Astronaut candidates Ron McNair, Bluford, and Fred Gregory wearing Apollo spacesuits, May 1978

=== Selection and training ===
Bluford was selected to become a NASA astronaut in January 1978 as a part of NASA astronaut group 8. He was one of several astronauts recruited by Nichelle Nichols as part of a NASA effort to increase the number of minority and female astronauts. They trained for a year and were officially designated as astronauts in August 1979. His technical assignments have included working with Space Station operations, the Remote Manipulator System (RMS), Spacelab systems and experiments, Space Shuttle systems, payload safety issues and verifying flight software in the Shuttle Avionics Integration Laboratory (SAIL) and in the Flight Systems Laboratory (FSL). Bluford was a mission specialist on STS-8, STS-61-A, STS-39, and STS-53.

=== STS-8 ===
Bluford's first mission was STS-8, which launched from Kennedy Space Center, Florida, on August 30, 1983. This was the third flight for the Orbiter Challenger and the first mission with a night launch and night landing. Bluford assisted the commander and pilot in developing the procedures and techniques for night time operations. He flew as flight engineer on the flight. During the mission, the STS-8 crew deployed the Indian National Satellite (INSAT-1B); tested the Canadian-built robotic arm (the Shuttle Remote Manipulator System (SRMS) or Canadarm) with the Payload Flight Test Article (PFTA); operated the Continuous Flow Electrophoresis System (CFES) with live cell samples; conducted medical measurements to understand bio-physiological effects of space flight; and activated four "Getaway Special" canisters. STS-8 completed 98 orbits of the Earth in 145 hours before landing at Edwards Air Force Base, California, on September 5, 1983.

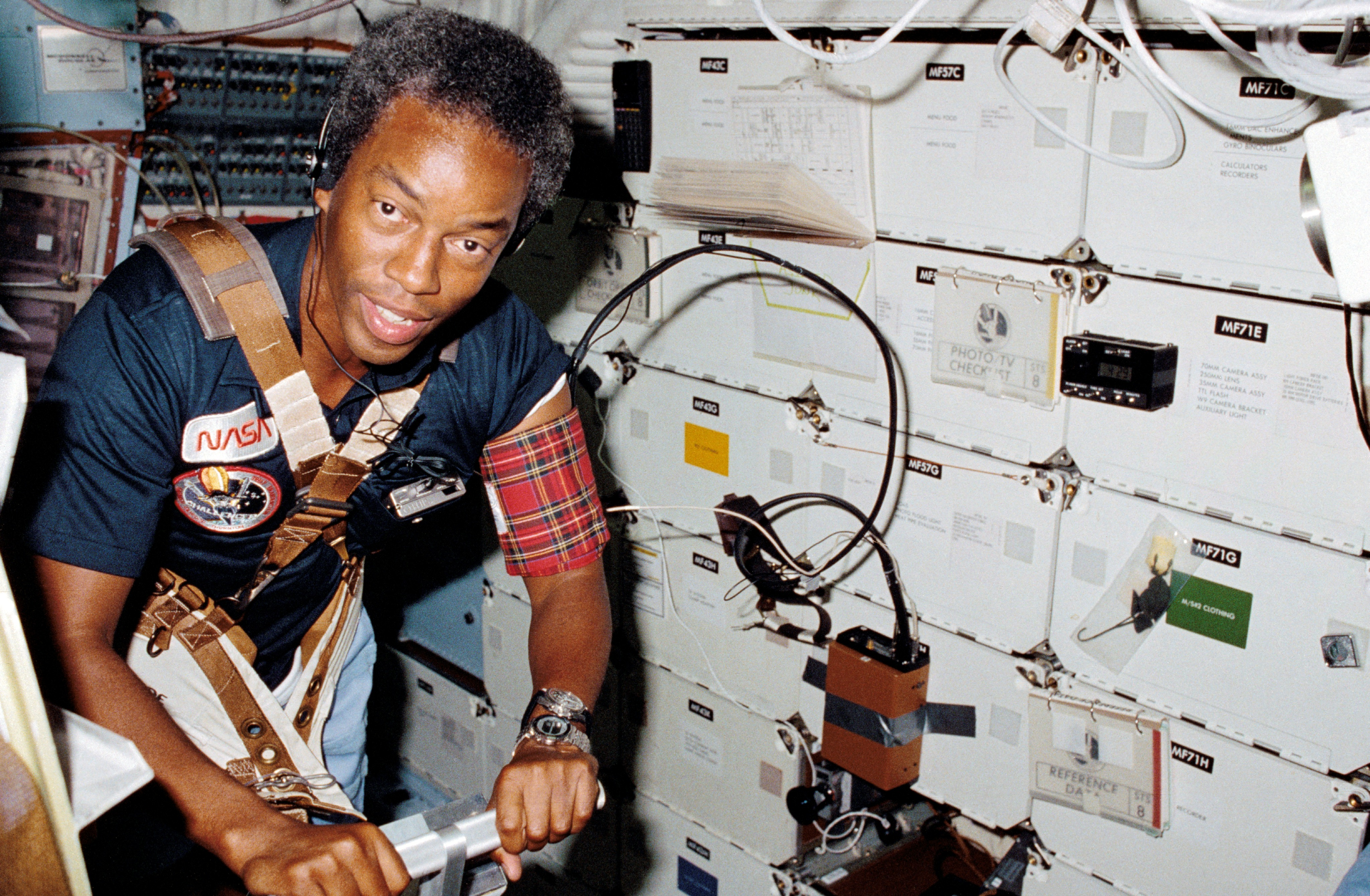
Bluford on STS-8 in 1983

=== STS-61-A ===
Bluford then served on the crew of STS-61-A, the German D-1 Spacelab mission, which launched from Kennedy Space Center on October 30, 1985. Bluford led the international payload team in all phases of on-orbit payload operations. This mission was the first to carry eight crew members, the largest crew to fly in space, and included three European payload specialists. This was the first dedicated Spacelab mission under the direction of the German Aerospace Research Establishment (DFVLR) and the first U.S. mission in which payload control was transferred to a foreign country (German Space Operations Center, Oberpfaffenhofen, Germany). During the mission, the Global Low Orbiting Message Relay Satellite (GLOMR) was deployed from a "Getaway Special" (GAS) container, and 76 experiments were performed in Spacelab in such fields as fluid physics, materials processing, life sciences, and navigation. After completing 111 orbits of the Earth in 169 hours, Challenger landed at Edwards Air Force Base on November 6, 1985.

=== STS-39 ===
Bluford also served on the crew of STS-39, which launched from Kennedy Space Center on April 28, 1991, aboard the Orbiter Discovery. Bluford managed the operation of several payloads in support of the DOD Strategic Defense Initiative Office. The crew gathered aurora, Earth-limb, celestial, and Shuttle environment data with the AFP-675 payload. This payload consisted of the Cryogenic Infrared Radiance Instrumentation for Shuttle (CIRRIS-1A) experiment, Far Ultraviolet Camera experiment (FAR UV), the Uniformly Redundant Array (URA), the Quadrupole Ion Neutral Mass Spectrometer (QINMS), and the Horizon Ultraviolet Program (HUP) experiment. The crew also deployed and retrieved the SPAS-II which carried the Infrared Background Signature Survey (IBSS) experiment. The crew also operated the Space Test Payload-1 (STP-1) and deployed a classified payload from the Multi-Purpose Experiment Canister (MPEC). After completing 134 orbits of the Earth and 199 hours in space, Discovery landed at the Kennedy Space Center on May 6, 1991.

=== STS-53 ===
Bluford's last mission was STS-53, which launched from Kennedy Space Center on December 2, 1992. He deployed the classified Department of Defense payload DOD-1 and then performed several Military-Man-in-Space and NASA experiments. After completing 115 orbits of the Earth in 175 hours, Discovery landed at Edwards Air Force Base on December 9, 1992.

=== Miscellaneous ===
Bluford, an Eagle Scout, was designated as the emissary to return the Challenger flag to Boy Scout Troop 514 of Monument, Colorado, in December 1986. On December 18 of that year, he presented the flag to the troop in a special ceremony at Falcon Air Force Base.

== Post-NASA career ==
Bluford left NASA and retired from the USAF in July 1993 to take the post of Vice President/General Manager, Engineering Services Division of NYMA, Greenbelt, Maryland. He moved to Cleveland to manage the corporate engineering support services contract. Bluford led the technical team of more than 400 scientists and engineers in providing technical and research support to NASA Lewis. In May 1997, NYMA was purchased by Federal Data Corporation. Bluford became Vice President of the Aerospace Sector of the Federal Data Corporation. He assumed responsibility for all NASA business development and contracts in the company. In October 2000, Federal Data Corporation was purchased by Northrup Grumman Corporation and Bluford became the Vice President of Microgravity R&D and Operations for the corporation. Under his leadership and management, Bluford's team designed, developed, built, and integrated two human spaceflight research facilities for the International Space Station. They also established the Telescience Support Center at NASA Lewis and developed and built hardware and instruments for microgravity flight experiments. In September 2002, Bluford retired from Northrup Grumman and founded the Aerospace Technology Group, an engineering consulting organization in Cleveland, Ohio.

Bluford served on numerous boards including the American Institute of Aeronautics and Astronautics (AIAA), the National Research Council's Aeronautics and Space Engineering Board (ASEB), the Aerospace Corporation Board, the Space Foundation Board, and the ENSCO Corporation Board. In 2003, he was the Executive Director of Investigative Activities for the Columbia Accident Investigation Board. He was inducted into the International Space Hall of Fame in 1997, the United States Astronaut Hall of Fame in 2010, and the National Aviation Hall of Fame in 2019.

In 2002, scholar Molefi Kete Asante listed Bluford on his list of 100 Greatest African Americans. In 2006, Bluford was recognized as a distinguished alumnus of Penn State by being selected as the Grand Marshal for his alma mater's Homecoming celebration.

In 2020, Ohio Governor Mike DeWine awarded him the Ohio Distinguished Service Medal: Ohio's highest non-combat decoration for service.

== Organizations ==
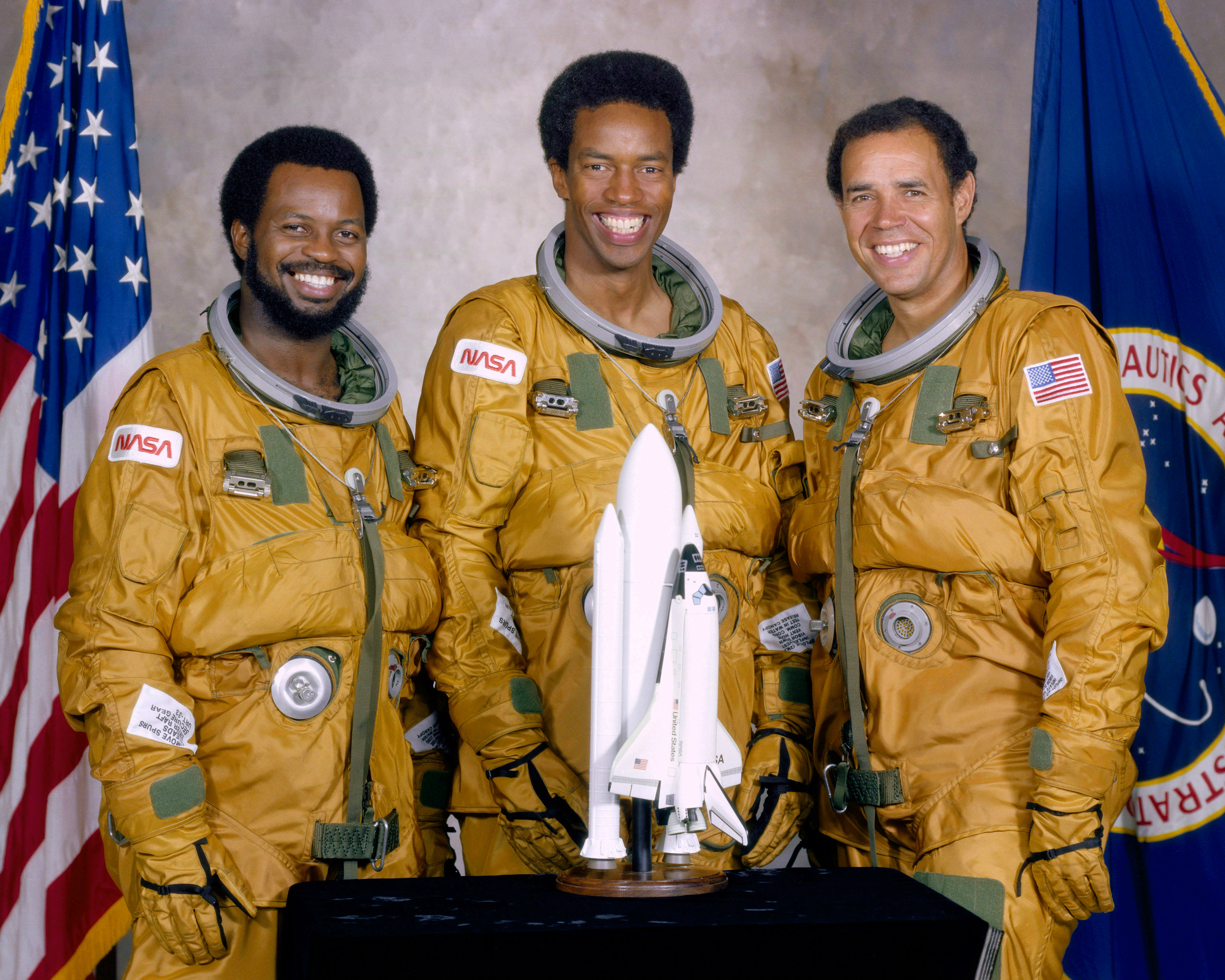
Some of NASA's first African-American astronauts including Ronald McNair, Bluford, and Frederick D. Gregory from the class of 1978 selection of astronauts

- Fellow, American Institute of Aeronautics and Astronautics
- Board of Governors, National Space Club (1997 to 2001)
- Board of Directors, National Inventor's Hall of Fame Foundation (1997 to 2002)
- Board of Directors, The Western Reserve Historical Society (1997 to 2003)
- Board of Directors, The Great Lakes Science Center (1997 to 2003)
- National Research Council (NRC) Aeronautics and Space Engineering Board, (1993 to 1998)
- Board of Directors, American Institute of Aeronautics and Astronautics, (1995 to 2001)
- Board of Directors, Life Director U.S. Space Foundation (2000 to 2006)
- Board of Directors, ENSCO, Inc., (2003 to 2023)
- Board of Trustees, The Aerospace Corporation (1999 to 2008)
- Executive Director of Investigative Activities, Columbia Accident Investigation Board (2003)
- Society of Distinguished Alumni, Pennsylvania State University (1986 to present)
- Committee on Minority Activities, Penn State College of Engineering, Pennsylvania State University (1986 to 2006)
- Leadership Cleveland (1995 to present)
- Board of Visitors, Hiram College, (2004 to 2009)
- Board of Advisors, Coalition for Space Exploration (2006 to 2010)
- Advisory Board National Air and Space Museum (2023 to Present)
- Tau Beta Pi
- Omicron Delta Kappa
- Sigma Iota Epsilon
- National Technical Association
- Tuskegee Airmen

== Awards and honors ==
- USAF Command Pilot Astronaut Wings (1983)
- Defense Superior Service Medal (1984)
- Legion of Merit (1993)
- Three Defense Meritorious Service Medals (1986, 1992 and 1993)
- Air Force Meritorious Service Medal (1978)
- Ten Air Force Air Medals (1967)
- Air Force Commendation Medal (1972)
- Three Air Force Outstanding Unit Awards (1967, 1970 and 1972)
- National Intelligence Medal of Achievement (1993)
- National Defense Service Medal (1965)
- Vietnam Service Medal (1967)
- Vietnam Cross of Gallantry with Palm (1967)
- Vietnam Campaign Medal (1967)
- NASA Distinguished Service Medal (1994)
- NASA Exceptional Service Medal (1992)
- Four NASA Group Achievement Awards (1980, 1981, 1989, and 2003)
- NASA Space Flight Medals (1983, 1985, 1991 and 1992)
- German Air Force (Luftwaffe) Aviation Badge of the Federal Republic of West Germany (1969)
- Leadership Award of Phi Delta Kappa (1962)
- T-38 Instructor Pilot of the Month (1970)
- Air Training Command Outstanding Flight Safety Award (1970)
- Air Force Institute of Technology's Mervin E. Gross Award (1974)
- Who's Who Among Black Americans (1975 to 1977)
- National Society of Black Engineers Distinguished National Scientist Award (1979)
- Pennsylvania State University Alumni Association's Distinguished Alumni Award (1983), the Alumni Fellows Award (1986)
- Ebony Black Achievement Award (1983)
- NAACP Image Award (1983)
- City of Philadelphia's Philadelphia Bowl (1983)
- Who's Who in America (1983 to present)
- Pennsylvania Distinguished Service Medal (1984)
- New York City Urban League's Whitney Young Memorial Award
- 1991 Black Engineer of the Year Award
- Fédération Aéronautique Internationale (FAI) V. M. Komarov Diploma (1993)
- International Space Hall of Fame inductee (1997)
- U.S. Astronaut Hall of Fame inductee (2010)
- National Aviation Hall of Fame inductee (2019)
- Air Force Institute of Technology Distinguished Alumni Award (2002)
- University of Houston–Clear Lake Distinguished Alumni Award (2003)
- The Pennsylvania Society Gold Medal (2011)
- The Ohio Distinguished Service Medal (2020)
- Air Force ROTC Distinguished Alumnus Award (2021)
- The Ohio Veterans Hall of Fame, inductee (2024)
- Omicron Delta Kappa Laurel Crowned Circle Award (2026)

He also received honorary doctorate degrees from Florida A&M University, Texas Southern University, Virginia State University, Morgan State University, Stevens Institute of Technology, Tuskegee Institute, Bowie State University, Thomas Jefferson University, Chicago State University, Georgian Court College, Drexel University, Kent State University, Central State University and the University of the Sciences.

Bluford Drew Jemison STEM Academy West, a middle/high school in Baltimore, Maryland, is named in his honor (along with Charles Drew and Mae Jemison). In 1993. an elementary school was named in his honor in Philadelphia. On October 8, 2021, a building on the main campus of The Pennsylvania State University in its Innovation Park was named the Guion S. Bluford Jr. Building in his honor.

On July 25, 2017, the Philadelphia Orchestra premiered Hold Fast to Dreams, a 25-minute piece for orchestra and choir in four movements, commissioned by the Mann Center for the Performing Arts in honor of Bluford, and written by composer Nolan Williams Jr.
