= William E. Thornton =

American astronaut (1929–2021)

William Thornton
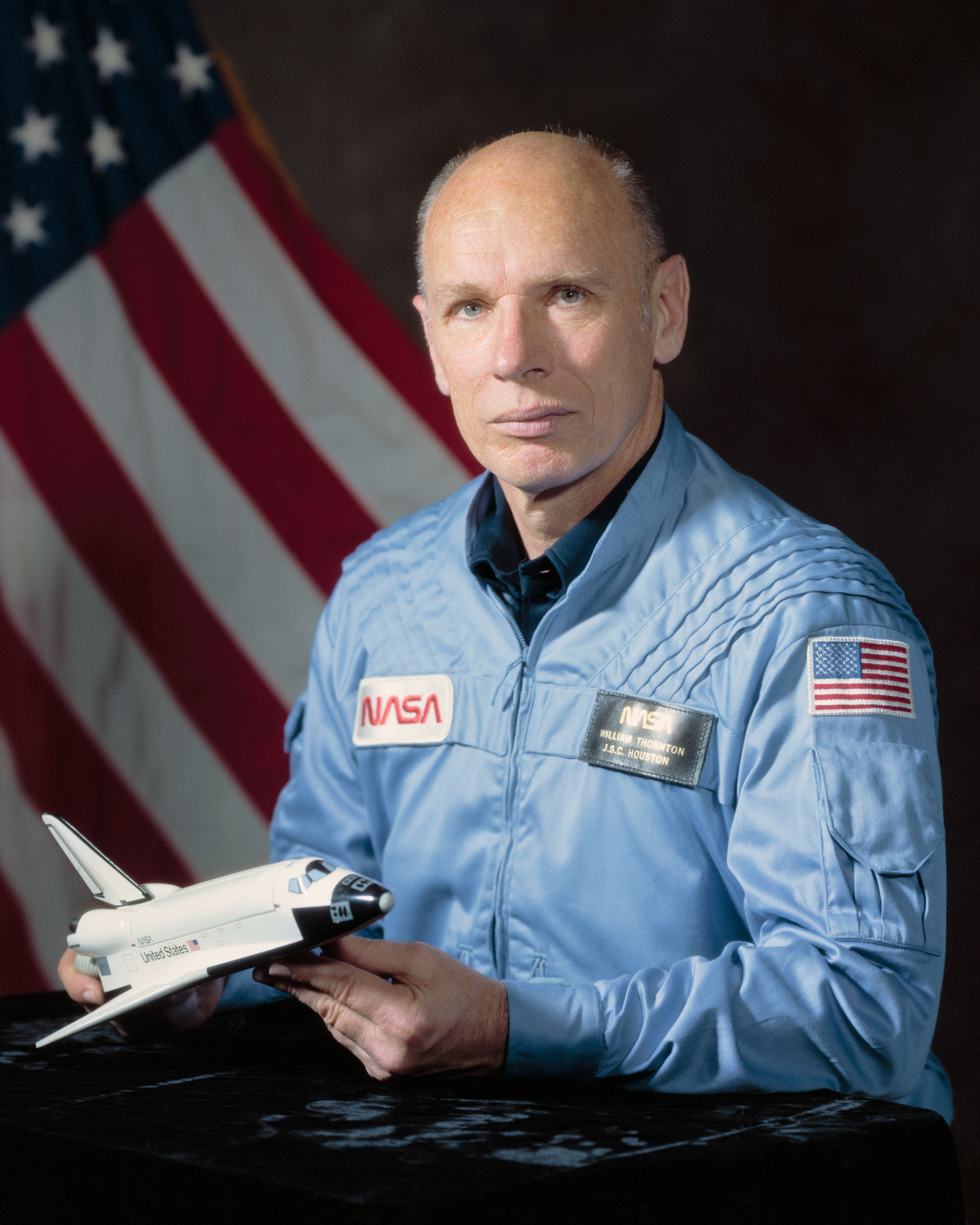
- Thornton in 1981
- Born: William Edgar Thornton; April 14, 1929; Faison, North Carolina, U.S.
- Died: January 11, 2021 (aged 91); Fair Oaks Ranch, Texas, U.S.
- Education: University of North Carolina, Chapel Hill (BS, MD)
- Space career

NASA astronaut
- Time in space: 13d 1h 16m
- Selection: NASA Group 6 (1967)
- Missions: STS-8; STS-51-B
- Retired: May 31, 1994

William Edgar Thornton (April 14, 1929 – January 11, 2021) was an American NASA astronaut. He received a Bachelor of Science degree in physics from University of North Carolina and a doctorate in medicine, also from UNC. He flew on Challenger twice, the STS-8 and STS-51-B missions.

== Early life and education ==
William Edgar Thornton was born on April 14, 1929. He attended primary and secondary schools in Faison, North Carolina. He received a bachelor of science degree in physics from the University of North Carolina (UNC) in 1952. In 1963, he received a doctorate in medicine from UNC.

== Experience ==
Following graduation from the University of North Carolina and having completed Air Force ROTC training, Thornton served as officer-in-charge of the Instrumentation Lab at the Flight Test Air Proving Ground. He later became a consultant to Air Proving Ground Command.

As chief engineer of the electronics division of the Del Mar Engineering Labs at Los Angeles from 1956 to 1959, he also organized and directed its Avionics Division. He returned to the University of North Carolina Medical School in 1959, graduated in 1963, and completed internship training in 1964 at the Wilford Hall USAF Hospital at Lackland Air Force Base, San Antonio, Texas.

Thornton returned to active duty with the United States Air Force and was then assigned to the USAF Aerospace Medical Division, Brooks Air Force Base, San Antonio, where he completed the Primary Flight Surgeon's training in 1964. It was during his two-year tour of duty there that he became involved in space medicine research and subsequently applied and was selected for astronaut training. Dr. Thornton developed and designed the first mass measuring devices for space, which remain in use today.

Thornton has logged over 2,500 hours pilot flying time in jet aircraft.

== NASA experience ==
Thornton was selected as a scientist-astronaut in August 1967 with NASA Astronaut Group 6. He completed the required flight training at Reese Air Force Base, Texas. Thornton was physician crew member on the highly successful Skylab Medical Experiments Altitude Test (SMEAT)—a 56-day simulation of a Skylab mission enabling crewmen to collect medical experiments baseline data and evaluate equipment, operations, and procedures. Thornton was also the mission specialist on SMD III, a simulation of a Spacelab life sciences mission.

Thornton was a member of the astronaut support crew for the Skylab 2, 3, and 4 missions, and principal investigator for Skylab experiments on mass measurement, anthropometric measurements, hemodynamics, and human fluid shifts and physical conditioning. He first documented the shift and loss of fluid changes in body posture size and shape, including increase in height and the rapid loss of muscle strength and mass in space flight.

As a member of the Astronaut Office Operations Missions Development group, Thornton was responsible for developing crew procedures and techniques for deployable payloads, and for maintenance of crew conditions in flight. He developed advanced techniques for, and made studies in, kinesiology and kinesimetry related to space operations.

During Space Shuttle operations he continued physiological investigations in the cardiovascular and musculoskeletal and neurological areas. He developed the Shuttle treadmill for in-flight exercise and several other on-board devices. He was long an advocate for exercise as a countermeasure for conditions such as bone loss in space. His work concentrated on the space adaptation syndrome, with relevant investigations on STS-4, STS-5, STS-6, STS-7, and STS-8.

Thornton holds more than 60 patents that range from military weapons systems through the first real-time EKG computer analysis. Space-related items include the first in-flight mass measurement devices, shock and vibration isolation systems, an improved waste collection system, an improved lower body negative pressure (LBNP) apparatus, and others.

Thornton continued his work in space medicine while awaiting his next flight opportunity. He worked on problems relative to extending mission durations in the Space Shuttle, in the Space station, and in space exploration, and has designed the necessary exercise and other hardware to support such missions. He continued analysis and publication of results from studies of neurological adaptation, and the study of neuromuscular inhibition following flight, osteoporosis in space and on Earth, and post-flight orthostatic hypotension. He has completed designs for exercise and other countermeasure equipment for the Extended Duration Orbiter (EDO), and for Space Station Freedom, including improved treadmills, rowing machines, isotonic exercise devices, and a bicycle. Much of this is currently scheduled for flight.

== Spaceflight experience ==
=== STS-8 ===
STS-8 Challenger (August 30 to September 5, 1983). This was the third flight for the Challenger and the first mission with a night launch from Kennedy Space Center, Florida, and a night landing at Edwards Air Force Base, California. Thornton, participating as a scientist-astronaut, was one of five crew members. During the flight Thornton made almost continuous measurements and investigations of adaptation of the human body to weightlessness, especially of the nervous system and of the space adaptation syndrome. This was a continuation of his previous work in these areas. Much of the equipment used was designed and developed by Thornton. The mission was accomplished in 98 orbits of the Earth, traveling 2.2 million miles in 145 hours, 8 minutes, 4 seconds. He became the oldest person to fly in space.

=== STS-51B ===
STS-51B/Spacelab-3 Challenger (April 29 to May 6, 1985). The Spacelab-3 science mission was launched from Kennedy Space Center, Florida, and returned for a night landing at Edwards Air Force Base, California. During the 7-day flight, Thornton was responsible for the first animal payload on a shuttle mission and other medical investigations. The mission was accomplished in 110 orbits of the Earth, traveling 2.9 million miles (4.7 million km) in 169 hours and 39 minutes.

At the conclusion of the STS-51B flight, Thornton had logged over 313 hours in space across his two missions.

== Post-NASA career ==
Thornton retired from NASA effective May 31, 1994. Thornton was later a Clinical Assistant Professor in the Department of Medicine, University of Texas Medical Branch, Galveston, Texas, and was an adjunct professor at the University of Houston–Clear Lake. He donated his NASA papers and archives to the North Carolina State Archives in 2010.

== Special honors ==
- Recipient of the Air Force Legion of Merit (1956)
- NASA Exceptional Service Medal (1972)
- NASA Exceptional Scientific Achievement Medal (1974)
- American Astronautical Society's Melbourne W. Boynton Award for 1975 (1977)
- two NASA Space Flight Medals (1983, 1985)
- University of North Carolina Distinguished Alumni Award (1983)
- Aerospace Medical Association Randy Lovelace Award (1984)
- AIAA Jeffries Medical Research Award (1985)
- Association of Military Surgeons of the United States Kern Award (1986)
- NASA Exceptional Engineering Achievement Medal (1988).

== Personal life and death ==
Thornton was married to the former Elizabeth Jennifer Fowler of Hertfordshire, England. They had two sons.

Thornton died at his home in Fair Oaks Ranch, Texas, on January 11, 2021, at the age of 91.
