= INSAT-4B =

Indian communications satellite (2007–2022)

- Mission type: Communications
- Operator: INSAT
- COSPAR ID: 2007-007A
- SATCAT no.: 30793
- Mission duration: Planned: 12 years Duration: 14 years, 10 months, 13 days

Spacecraft properties
- Bus: I-3K
- Manufacturer: ISRO
- Launch mass: 3,028 kilograms (6,676 lb)
- Dry mass: 1,335 kilograms (2,943 lb)
- Power: 5,859 W

Start of mission
- Launch date: 11 March 2007, 22:03 UTC
- Rocket: Ariane 5ECA
- Launch site: Kourou ELA-3
- Contractor: Arianespace

End of mission
- Disposal: Graveyard orbit
- Deactivated: 24 January 2022

Orbital parameters
- Reference system: Geocentric
- Regime: Geostationary
- Longitude: 85.5° E (relocated on 20 Feb 2020) 83° E (relocated on 12 Oct 2019); 111.2° E (relocated on 18 Dec 2017) 93.48° E (till 11 Nov 2017)
- Semi-major axis: 42,163.57 kilometres (26,199.23 mi)
- Eccentricity: 0.0003909
- Perigee altitude: 35,776 kilometres (22,230 mi)
- Apogee altitude: 35,809 kilometres (22,251 mi)
- Inclination: 0.07 degrees
- Period: 23.93 hours
- Epoch: 11 November 2013, 22:16:22 UTC

INSAT-4B was an Indian communications satellite which forms part of the Indian National Satellite System. Launched in 2007, it was placed in geostationary orbit at a longitude of 93.48° East.

Built by the Indian Space Research Organisation, INSAT-4B is based upon the I-3K satellite bus. It had a mass at launch of 3,028 kilograms (6,676 lb), with a dry mass of 1,335 kilograms (2,943 lb) and was expected to operate for twelve years. Two solar arrays power the satellite, while its communications payload consists of twelve C and twelve K_{u} band transponders.

Arianespace was contracted to launch INSAT-4B using an Ariane 5 ECA carrier rocket. The launch occurred on 11 March 2007 at 22:03 UTC, from ELA-3 at Kourou. The Skynet 5A military communications satellite for the British Ministry of Defence was launched aboard the same rocket.

INSAT-4B was successfully inserted into geosynchronous transfer orbit, from which it raised itself into geostationary orbit using a liquid-fuelled apogee motor. It received the International Designator 2007-007A and Satellite Catalog Number 30793. As of 11 November 2013, it is in an orbit with a perigee of 35,776 kilometres (22,230 mi), an apogee of 35,809 kilometres (22,251 mi), inclination of 0.07 degrees and an orbital period of 23.93 hours.

== Partial power failure ==
On 10 July 2010 INSAT-4B suffered a disruption in power supply from one of the two solar panels, rendering half of its transponder capacity useless. After review the cause of malfunction was found out to be electric arcing in slip ring of one of the solar panels. Similar partial power supply failure also affected Eutelsat W2M now known as Afghansat 1 and caused delay in launch of GSAT-8 due to required design changes in relevant power systems of satellite bus.

== Relocation ==
On 11 November 2017, INSAT-4B maneuvered to lower its altitude and drifted eastward to reach new slot at 111.2°E on 18 December 2017.

On 20 August 2019, altitude of INSAT-4B was raised and it was relocated to new 83°E slot on 12 October 2019.

On 15 February 2020, altitude of INSAT-4B was lowered and it was relocated to new 85.5°E slot on 20 February 2020.

== Decommissioning ==
Towards the end of its life INSAT-4B was placed in Graveyard orbit under post mission disposal procedure and subsequently decommissioned on 24 January 2022, in accordance with the space debris mitigation guidelines recommended by UN and the Inter Agency Space Debris Coordination Committee (IADC).
