= INSAT-1B =

Defunct Indian communications and meteorology satellite

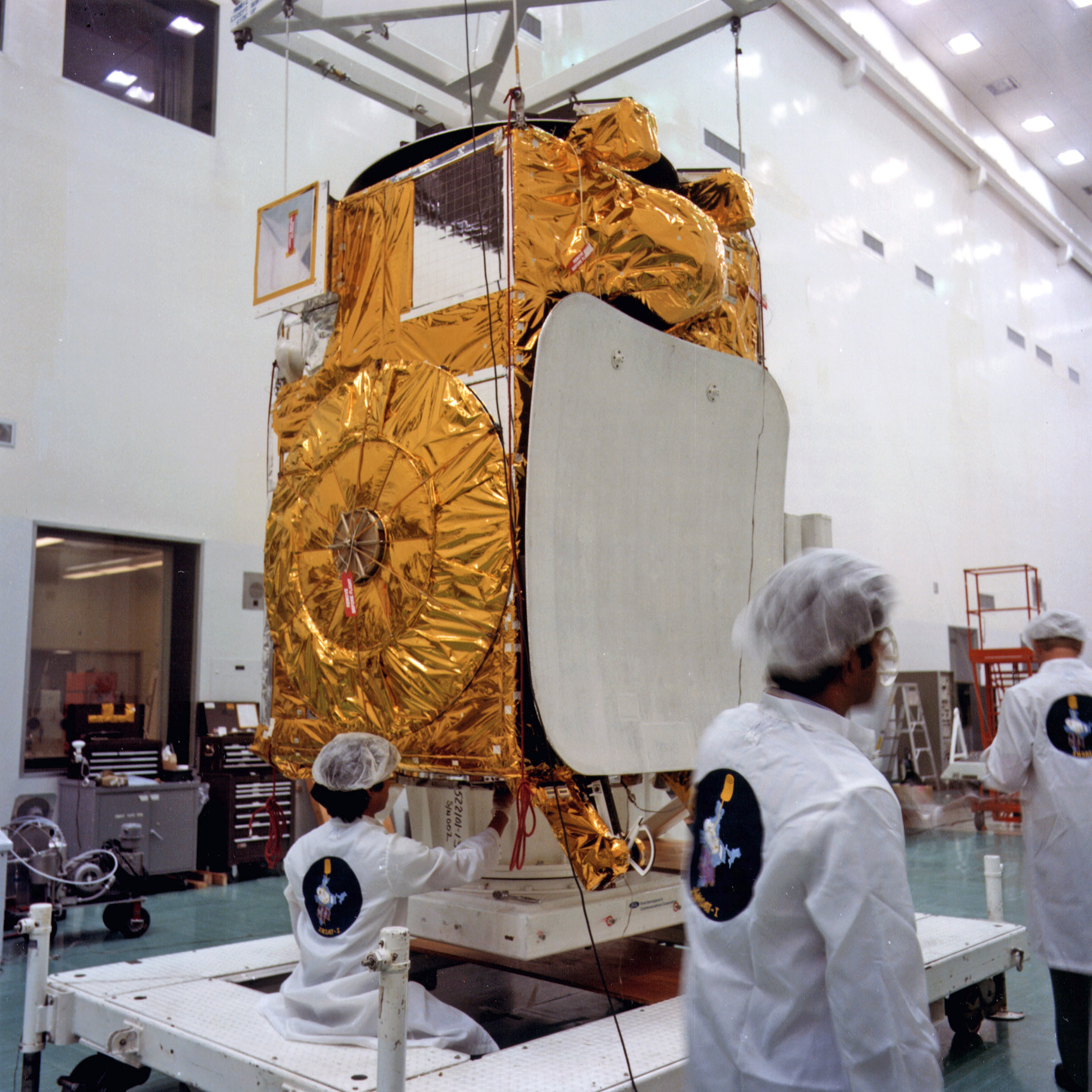
- INSAT-1B before launch
- Mission type: Communications
- Operator: INSAT
- COSPAR ID: 1983-089B
- SATCAT no.: 14318
- Mission duration: 7 years

Spacecraft properties
- Spacecraft type: INSAT-1
- Manufacturer: Ford Aerospace
- Launch mass: 1,152 kilograms (2,540 lb)

Start of mission
- Launch date: 30 August 1983, 06:32:00 UTC
- Rocket: Space Shuttle Challenger; STS-8 / PAM-D
- Launch site: Kennedy LC-39A
- Contractor: NASA
- Deployment date: 31 August 1983, 07:48 UTC

End of mission
- Disposal: Decommissioned
- Deactivated: August 1993

Orbital parameters
- Reference system: Geocentric
- Regime: Geostationary
- Longitude: 74° east (1983-92); 93° east (1992-93)
- Semi-major axis: 42,164.88 kilometres (26,200.04 mi)
- Eccentricity: 0.0012393
- Perigee altitude: 35,741 kilometres (22,208 mi)
- Apogee altitude: 35,846 kilometres (22,274 mi)
- Inclination: 14.69 degrees
- Period: 23.93 hours
- Epoch: 14 November 2013, 15:52:38 UTC

INSAT-1B was an Indian communications satellite which formed part of the Indian National Satellite System. Launched in 1983, it was operated in geostationary orbit at a longitude of 74 degrees east. At the end of its seven-year design life it was replaced by the newly launched INSAT-1D, dropping to backup status. In 1992, it was relocated to 93° east, before being decommissioned in August 1993.

Built by Ford Aerospace and operated by the Indian National Satellite System, INSAT-1B was based upon a custom satellite bus developed for the INSAT-1 series of satellites. It had a mass at launch of 1,152 kilograms (2,540 lb), and was expected to operate for seven years. The spacecraft carried twelve C and three S band transponders, powered by a single solar array. A stabilisation boom was used to counterbalance radiation torques from the satellite's asymmetrical design. The spacecraft was propelled by an R-4D-11 apogee motor.

INSAT-1B was deployed by Space Shuttle Challenger during the STS-8 mission. Challenger lifted off from Launch Complex 39A at the Kennedy Space Center at 06:32:00 UTC on 30 August 1983. INSAT-1B was deployed from the orbiter's payload bay at 07:48 UTC on 31 August, with a PAM-D upper stage firing shortly afterwards to place it into geosynchronous transfer orbit. The spacecraft used its own propulsion system to raise itself into geostationary orbit. It received the International Designator 1983-089B and Satellite Catalog Number 14318.

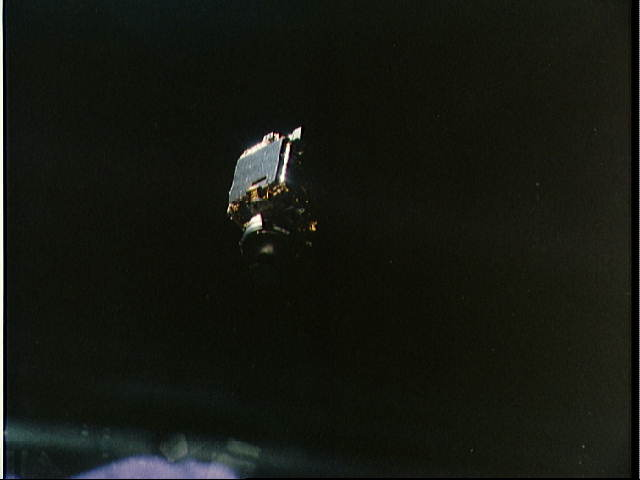
INSAT-1B satellite being deployed from the Space shuttle.

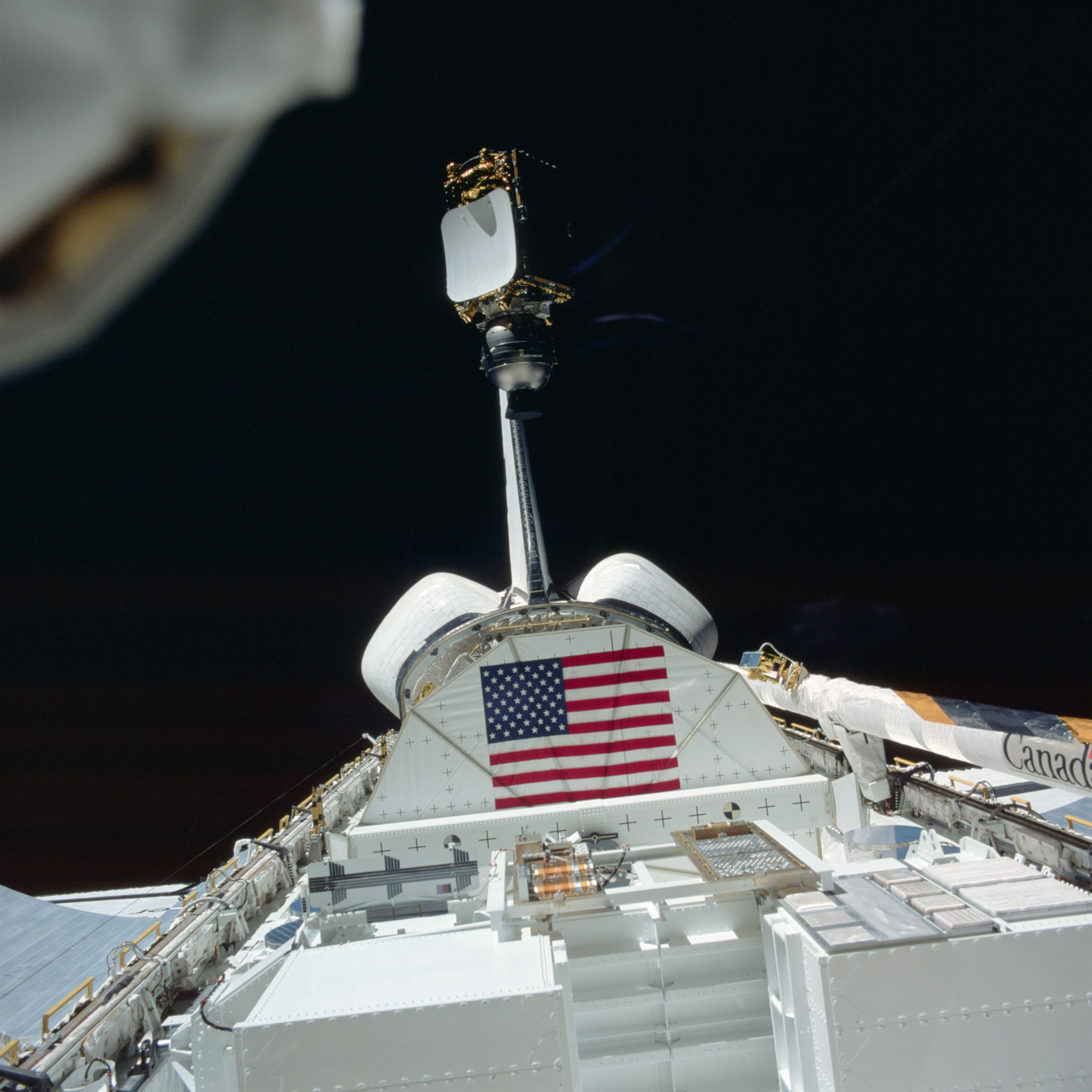
Satellite being deployed from the payload bay of Space Shuttle Challenger.

After some initial problems deploying its solar array, INSAT-1B became operational in October 1983. It was located at 74° east for most of its operational life, before being moved to 93° east in 1992. In August 1993 it was decommissioned and raised to a graveyard orbit slightly above geosynchronous altitude. As of 14 November 2013, it is in an orbit with a perigee of 35,741 kilometres (22,208 mi), an apogee of 35,846 kilometres (22,274 mi), inclination of 14.69 degrees and an orbital period of 23.93 hours.
