= INSAT-1C =

Indian communication satellite

- Mission type: Communication
- Operator: INSAT
- COSPAR ID: 1988-063A
- SATCAT no.: 19330
- Mission duration: 7 years (planned); 13 years (achieved)

Spacecraft properties
- Bus: I-1K
- Manufacturer: Ford Aerospace
- Launch mass: 1,190 kilograms (2,620 lb)

Start of mission
- Launch date: 21 July 1988
- Rocket: Ariane 3
- Launch site: Kourou ELA-2
- Contractor: Arianespace

Orbital parameters
- Reference system: Geocentric
- Regime: Geostationary
- Longitude: 93.5° East
- Period: 24 hours

INSAT-1C was the third in the first generation INSAT series of satellites (termed as INSAT-1) built by Ford Aerospace to satisfy the domestic communication requirement of India. The Govt. agencies using its services were All India Radio, Doordarshan, Department of Space and Indian Meteorological Department

== Launch ==
INSAT-1C was launched from Guiana Space Centre in Kourou using Ariane 3 rocket on July 21, 1988. At launch, it had a mass of 1,190 kilograms (2,620 lb), and an expected operational lifespan of seven years. The satellite was positioned at 93.5° East longitude in geostationary orbit

== Payloads ==
INSAT-1C carried 3 payloads on board to provide communication services to Indian Meteorological Department, Department of Telecommunications and Department of Space:

- Very High Resolution scanning Radiometer (VHRR)
- 12 transponders operating in 2-phases (earth-to-satellite and vice versa).
- Data channel to send data for land based applications.

== Mission ==
INSAT-1C mission was a success and lasted for about 13 years because the satellite got another 6 C-band transponders and 2 S-band transponders when a power system made one more bus

== See also ==
- 1988 in spaceflight
