= Indian National Satellite System =

Series of multipurpose geo-stationary satellites launched by ISRO

INSAT
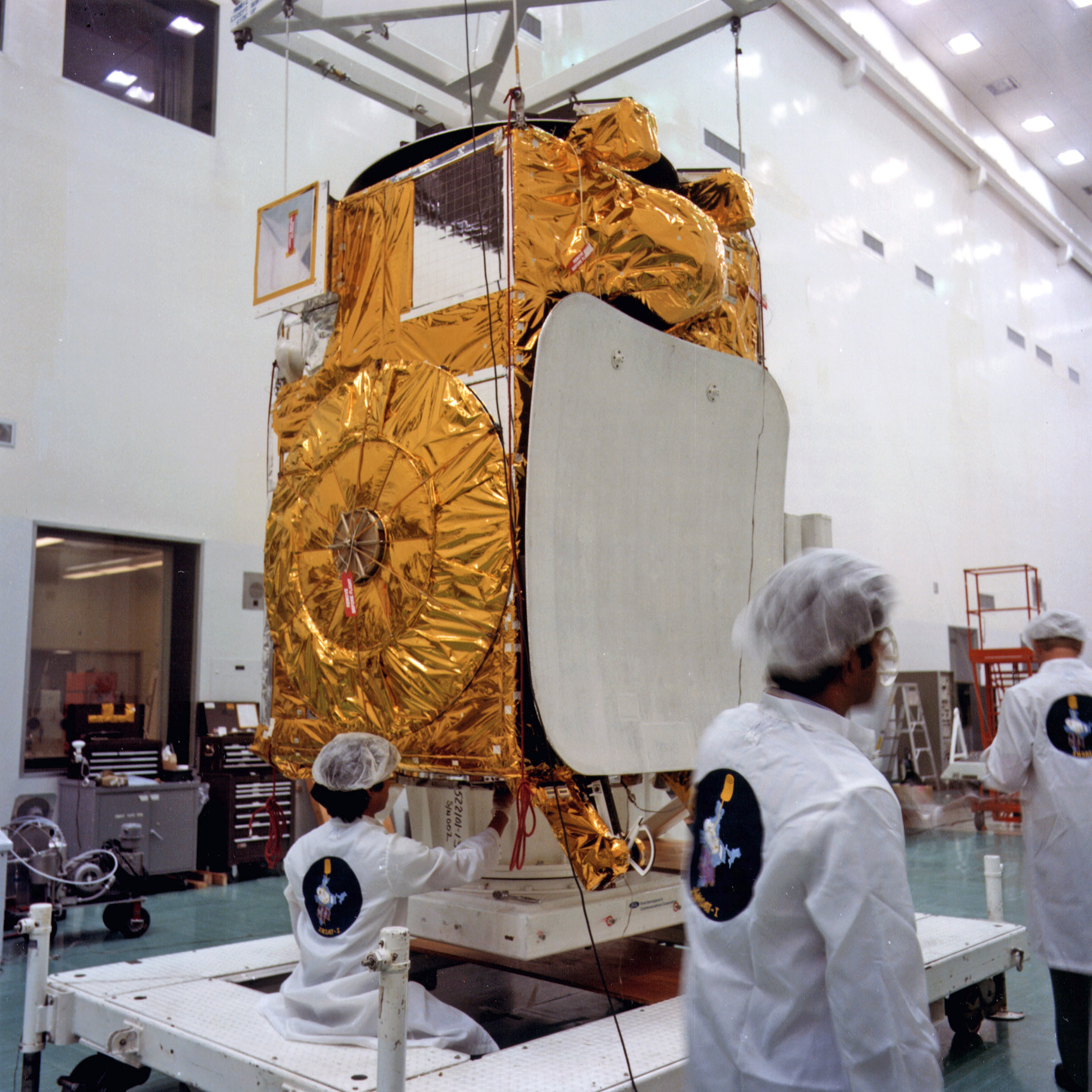
- INSAT-1B
- Manufacturer: ISRO
- Country of origin: India
- Operator: INSAT
- Applications: Communications and Meteorology

Specifications
- Regime: Geostationary orbit

Production
- Status: In service
- On order: 0
- Built: 24
- Launched: 24
- Operational: 9
- Retired: 12
- Failed: 1
- Lost: 2
- Maiden launch: INSAT-1A, 10 April 1982
- Last launch: INSAT-3DS, 17 February 2024

The Indian National Satellite System or INSAT, is a series of multipurpose geostationary satellites launched by ISRO to satisfy telecommunications, broadcasting, meteorology, and search and rescue operations. Commissioned in 1983, INSAT is the largest domestic communication system in the Indo-Pacific Region and laid the foundation for India's self-reliant space-based communication infrastructure. It is a joint venture of the Department of Space, Department of Telecommunications, India Meteorological Department, All India Radio and Doordarshan. The overall coordination and management of INSAT system rests with the Secretary-level INSAT Coordination Committee.

INSAT satellites provide transponders in various bands to serve the television and communication needs of India. Some of the satellites also have the Very High Resolution Radiometer (VHRR), CCD cameras for meteorological imaging. The satellites also incorporate transponder(s) for receiving distress alert signals for search and rescue missions in the South Asian and Indian Ocean Region, as ISRO is a member of the Cospas-Sarsat program.

== INSAT system ==
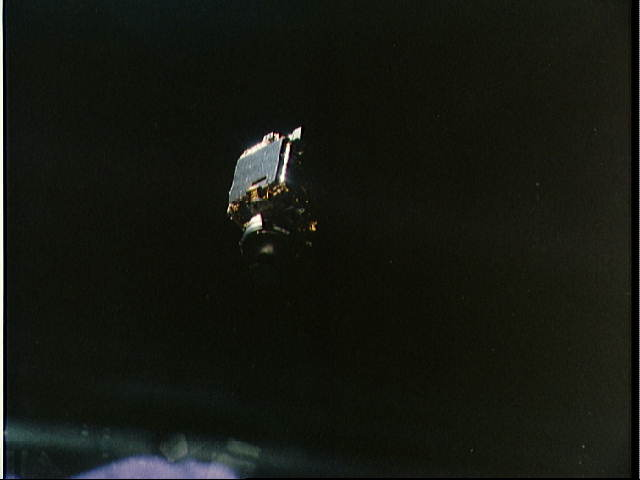
INSAT-1B satellite: Broadcasting sector in India is highly dependent on INSAT system.

The Indian National Satellite (INSAT) system was commissioned with the launch of INSAT-1B in August 1983 (INSAT-1A, the first satellite was launched in April 1982 but could not fulfil the mission). INSAT system ushered in a revolution in India's television and radio broadcasting, telecommunications and meteorological sectors. It enabled the rapid expansion of TV and modern telecommunication facilities to even the remote areas and off-shore islands. Together, the system provides transponders in C, Extended C and K_{u} bands for a variety of communication services. Some of the INSATs also carry instruments for meteorological observation and data relay for providing meteorological services. KALPANA-1 is an exclusive meteorological satellite. The satellites are monitored and controlled by Master Control Facilities that exist in Hassan and Bhopal.

=== INSAT-1 series ===
The first generation of INSAT satellites, developed with NASA assistance, included INSAT-1A, 1B, 1C, and 1D, with all of them being launched in the 1980s. Their success established India's capability to operate a national communications and weather-monitoring satellite fleet. 1B, launched in 1983, became the first fully operational Indian GEO communications satellite.

=== INSAT-2 series ===
The INSAT-2 series during the 1990s, marked the shift to fully indigenous satellite design. Models included INSAT-2A, 2B, SC, 2D, and 2E, each offering expanded transponder capacity, improved meteorological imaging and enhanced reliability.

=== INSAT-3 series ===
Launched between 2000 and 2003, the INSAT-3 series introduced larger satellites with advanced payloads. 3B was for business communication, 3C for national telecommunication backbone, 3A and 3D for meteorology and disaster warning, and 3E for broadacting [sic?] and data relay.

=== INSAT-4 series ===
The INSAT-4 generation launched between 2005 and 2010 focused on high-power K_{u}-band DTH broadcasting. 4A was India's first dedicated DTH satellite, 4B and 4CR was for communication and replacement missions, and 4E (also known as GSAT-6) had a large S-band antenna for mobile communications. INSAT-4 satellites were eventually supplemented by the newer GSAT series.

=== Transition into GSAT ===
Many communication satellites which were originally conceived under the INSAT umbrella were reclassified as GSAT as ISRO shifted to newer satellite bus platforms of I-2K and I-3K. INSAT continues to focus mainly on meteorology and disaster management, while GSAT handles broadband, telecom, and strategic communication.

== List of INSAT satellites ==
The following is a list of launched INSAT satellites.

Launched INSAT satellites
INSAT series	GSAT Series	Other name(s)	COSPAR ID	Launch date and time, UTC	Launch vehicle	Lift-off mass	Orbital parameters		Outcome	Purpose
INSAT series	GSAT Series	Other name(s)	COSPAR ID	Launch date and time, UTC	Launch vehicle	Lift-off mass	Longitude	Inclination	Outcome	Purpose
INSAT-1A	—		1982-031A	10 April 1982, 06:47:00	(United States) Delta 3910 / PAM-D	1,152 kg (2,540 lb)	74° East	14.59°	Partial success	Communication
INSAT-1A	—		First Satellite in INSAT Series and First Satellite of INSAT-1 Series. Built by Ford Aerospace, operated for only five months out of seven years planned. Abandoned on 6 September 1982 after a series of failures.							
INSAT-1B	—		1983-089B	30 August 1983, 06:32:00	(United States) Space Shuttle Challenger STS-8 / PAM-D	1,152 kg (2,540 lb)	93° East (1992-93) (Note: 74° East (1983-92))	14.69°	Successful	Communication
INSAT-1B	—		First successful INSAT satellite. At the end of its seven-year design life it was replaced by the newly launched INSAT-1D, dropping to backup status. Decommissioned in August 1993.							
INSAT-1C	—		1988-063A	21 July 1988, 06:32:00	(France) Ariane 3	1,190 kg (2,620 lb)	93.5° East	11.6°	Successful	Communication and meteorology
INSAT-1C	—		Decommissioned in 2001 after thirteen years of service.							
INSAT-1D	—		1988-063A	9 July 1992, 05:52:00	(United States) Delta 4000 4925-8	1,190 kg (2,620 lb)	83° East	14.30°	Successful	Telecom
INSAT-1D	—		Last satellite of INSAT-1 series. Aided in setting up national computer networks. Decommissioned on 14 May 2002.							
INSAT-2A	—		1992-041A	9 July 1992, 22:42:00	(France) Ariane 4 44L V-51/423	1,906 kg (4,202 lb)	74° East	14.5°	Successful	Meteorology and Search and rescue
INSAT-2A	—		INSAT-2A has an advanced power amplifiers for catering communication terminals and was the first series-2 satellite to replace the INSAT-1.							
INSAT-2B	—		1993-048B	22 July 1993, 22:58:00	(France) Ariane 4 44L V-58/429	1,906 kg (4,202 lb)	93.5° East	14.4°	Successful	Multipurpose
INSAT-2B	—		Primarily for telecommunication and meteorological observations, also carried a search and rescue transponder. Decommissioned on 1 July 2004.							
INSAT-2C	—		1995-067B	6 December 1995, 23:23:00	(France) Ariane 4 44L V-81/453	2,106 kg (4,643 lb)	93.5° East	14.2°	Successful	Communication
INSAT-2C	—		It had capabilities of business communication, mobile satellite service and could make television outreach beyond boundaries of India. In January 2013, its communication C-band transponder collapsed. It also improved communication facilities in Northeast India and Andaman and Nicobar Islands.							
INSAT-2D	—		1997-027B	4 June 1997, 23:23:00	(France) Ariane 4 44L V-97/468	2,079 kg (4,583 lb)	93.5° East	12.8°	Partial success	Communication
INSAT-2D	—		Became inoperable just four months later on 4 October 1997, due to a power bus anomaly and associated problems, most likely a short circuit.							
INSAT-2DT	—	(Saudi Arabia) Arabsat-1C (formerly)	1992-010	26 February 1992, 23:58:10	(France) Ariane 4 44L V-49/421	1,360 kg (3,000 lb)	82.5° East	14.2°	Successful	Communication
INSAT-2DT	—	(Saudi Arabia) Arabsat-1C (formerly)	In November 1997, Arabsat-1C was sold to India as INSAT-2DT. Decommissioned in October 2004.							
INSAT-2E	—	APR-1	1999-016A	2 April 1999, 22:03:00	(France) Ariane 4 42P V-117/486	2,550 kg (5,620 lb)	83° East	11°	Operational	Communication and weather
INSAT-2E	—	APR-1	INSAT-2E is using ultra-light Magnesium-lithium alloys developed by DMRL. It also carries two meteorological instruments; the Very High Resolution Radiometer (VHRR), and a CCD camera capable of returning images with a resolution of one kilometre.							
INSAT-3A	—		2003-013A	9 April 2003, 22:52:00	(France) Ariane 5 42P V-117/486	2,950 kg (6,500 lb)	93.5° East	8.3°	Operational	Multipurpose
INSAT-3A	—		Third satellite launched in INSAT-3 series after INSAT-3B & INSAT-3C.							
INSAT-3B	—		2000-016B	21 March 2000, 23:28:00	(France) Ariane 5 G 505	5,800 kg (12,800 lb)	83° East	10.4°	Successful	Communication
INSAT-3B	—		First Geostationary satellite of India.							
INSAT-3C	—		2002-002A	23 January 2002, 23:46:57	(France) Ariane 4 42L-3 4108	5,800 kg (12,800 lb)	74° East	7.9°	Operational	Multipurpose
INSAT-3C	—		Provides voice, video and digital data services to India and neighboring countries.							
INSAT-3D	—		2013-038B	25 July 2013, 19:54:07	(France) Ariane 5 ECA 569	2,061 kg (4,544 lb)	82° East	1.4°	Operational	Meteorology
INSAT-3D	—		The satellite had many new technology elements like star sensor, micro stepping Solar Array Drive Assembly (SADA) to reduce the spacecraft disturbances and Bus Management Unit (BMU) for control and telecom and telemetry function.							
INSAT-3DR	—		2016-054A	8 September 2016, 11:20:00	(India) GSLV MkII F09	2,061 kg (4,544 lb)	74° East	0.1°	Operational	Meteorology
INSAT-3DR	—		Uses a 6-channel imager and a 19-channel sounder, as well as search and rescue information and message relay for terrestrial data collection platforms.							
INSAT-3DS	—		2024-033A	17 February 2024, 12:05:00	(India) GSLV MkII F14	2,275 kg (5,016 lb)	74° East	0.0°	Operational	Meteorology
INSAT-3DS	—		Follow on of INSAT-3DR mission.							
INSAT-3E	—		2003-047E	27 September 2003, 23:14:46	(France) Ariane 5G V162	2,775 kg (6,118 lb)	55° East	9.2°	Successful	Communication
INSAT-3E	—		Ran out of oxidizer after seven years of operation, moved to Graveyard orbit in April 2014.							
INSAT-4A	—		2005-049A	21 December 2005, 22:33:00	(France) Ariane 5GS 525	1,386 kg (3,056 lb)	83° East	5.9°	Successful	Telecom
INSAT-4A	—		At the time of launch, it was the heaviest satellite India had built. Decommissioned on 21 October 2019.							
INSAT-4B	—		2007-007A	11 March 2007, 22:03:00	(France) Ariane 5ECA 535	1,335 kg (2,943 lb)	93.48° East	5.6°	Successful	Communication
INSAT-4B	—		Suffered a disruption in power supply from one of the two solar panels, rendering half of its transponder capacity useless. Decommissioned on 24 January 2022.							
INSAT-4C	—		—	10 July 2006, 12:08:00	(India) GSLV MKI F02	2,168 kg (4,780 lb)	—		Launch failure	Communication
INSAT-4C	—		Both rocket and satellite had to be destroyed over the Bay of Bengal after the rocket's trajectory veered outside permitted limits.							
INSAT-4CR	—		2007-037A	2 September 2007, 12:51:00	(India) GSLV MKI F04	2,168 kg (4,780 lb)	74° East	6.3°	Successful	Communication
INSAT-4CR	—		Due to an error in the guidance subsystem , rocket achieved orbit had lower apogee and inclination higher than expected. Orbit corrected through satellite, eventually the INSAT-4CR was placed in its slot. Decommissioned on 24 November 2020.							
INSAT-4E	GSAT-6	—	2015-041A	27 August 2015, 11:22:00	(India) GSLV MKII D6	2,117 kg (4,667 lb)	83° East	6.3°	Operational	Multimedia
INSAT-4E	GSAT-6	—	Offers a Satellite Digital Multimedia Broadcasting (S-DMB) service across several digital multimedia terminals or consoles which can be used to provide information services to vehicles on the fly and to the mobile phones.							
INSAT-4F	GSAT-7	—	2013-044B	29 August 2013, 20:30:00	(France) Ariane 5 ECA 570	2,117 kg (4,667 lb)	74° East	0.1°	Operational	Military
INSAT-4F	GSAT-7	—	According to defense experts, the satellite will enable the navy to extend its blue water capabilities and stop relying on foreign satellites like Inmarsat, which provide communication services to its ships.							
INSAT-4G	GSAT-8	—	2011-022A	20 May 2011, 20:38:00	(France) Ariane 5 ECA VA202	2,117 kg (4,667 lb)	55° East	1.6°	Operational	Communication
INSAT-4G	GSAT-8	—	First satellite to carry GAGAN payload.							

== See also ==
- List of Indian satellites
- Indian Remote Sensing Programme (IRSP)
- Indian Regional Navigation Satellite System (IRNSS)
- GSAT
