= INSAT-1A =

Indian geostationary communications satellite

INSAT 1A
- Mission type: Communications
- Operator: INSAT
- COSPAR ID: 1982-031A
- SATCAT no.: 131300
- Mission duration: 7 years planned 5 months achieved

Spacecraft properties
- Spacecraft type: INSAT-1
- Manufacturer: Ford Aerospace
- Launch mass: 1,152 kilograms (2,540 lb)

Start of mission
- Launch date: 10 April 1982, 06:47 UTC
- Rocket: Delta 3910/PAM-D
- Launch site: Cape Canaveral LC-17A
- Contractor: NASA

End of mission
- Disposal: Abandoned
- Deactivated: 6 September 1982

Orbital parameters
- Reference system: Geocentric
- Regime: Geostationary
- Longitude: 74° east
- Semi-major axis: 42,158.98 kilometres (26,196.38 mi)
- Eccentricity: 0.0012778
- Perigee altitude: 35,734 kilometres (22,204 mi)
- Apogee altitude: 35,841 kilometres (22,271 mi)
- Inclination: 14.59 degrees
- Period: 23.93 hours
- Epoch: 10 November 2013, 12:38:56 UTC

INSAT-1A was an Indian communications satellite which formed part of the Indian National Satellite System. Launched in 1982, it was operated in geostationary orbit at a longitude of 74° east. Following a series of failures, the satellite was abandoned in September 1982, less than six months into a seven-year mission.

Built by Ford Aerospace and operated by the Indian National Satellite System, INSAT-1A was based upon a custom satellite bus developed for the INSAT-1 series. It had a mass at launch of 1,152 kilograms (2,540 lb), and was expected to operate for 7 years. The spacecraft carried 12 C and 3 S band transponders, powered by a single solar array.

NASA was contracted to launch INSAT-1A using a Delta 3910 rocket with a PAM-D upper stage. The launch occurred at 06:47 UTC on 10 April 1982, from Launch Complex 17A at Cape Canaveral Air Force Station. The satellite was successfully inserted into geosynchronous transfer orbit, from which it raised itself into geostationary orbit. It received the International Designator 1982-031A and Satellite Catalog Number 13129.

Following launch, INSAT-1A had some initial problems deploying its antennas, solar array and stabilisation boom. The C-band antenna could not be deployed for twelve days, and the solar array failed to extend fully, preventing the spacecraft generating enough power to conduct weather observation. The satellite's S-band transponders subsequently overheated and failed. The stabilisation boom failed to deploy altogether.

Early in the satellite's mission a fault in a valve in its attitude control system was detected which caused the spacecraft to expend propellant at a greater rate than expected. On 4 September 1982 the satellite's primary Earth-tracking sensor was temporarily deactivated to protect the system while the Sun passed through its field of view. Owing to the failure of the stabilisation boom, the backup sensor was not oriented in the correct direction, instead being oriented towards the Moon, which overloaded it and shut down the sensor. The satellite exhausted its remaining propellant supply trying to regain Earth-lock, and was abandoned on 6 September. Due to the sudden nature of its failure, INSAT-1A was not removed from geosynchronous orbit. As of 10 November 2013 it is in an orbit with a perigee of 35,734 kilometres (22,204 mi), an apogee of 35,841 kilometres (22,271 mi), inclination of 14.59 degrees and an orbital period of 23.93 hours.
