= List of militaries by country =

This is a list of militaries by country, including main military branches.

== A ==
=== Afghanistan ===
Afghan Armed Forces

- Army
- Air Force

=== Albania ===
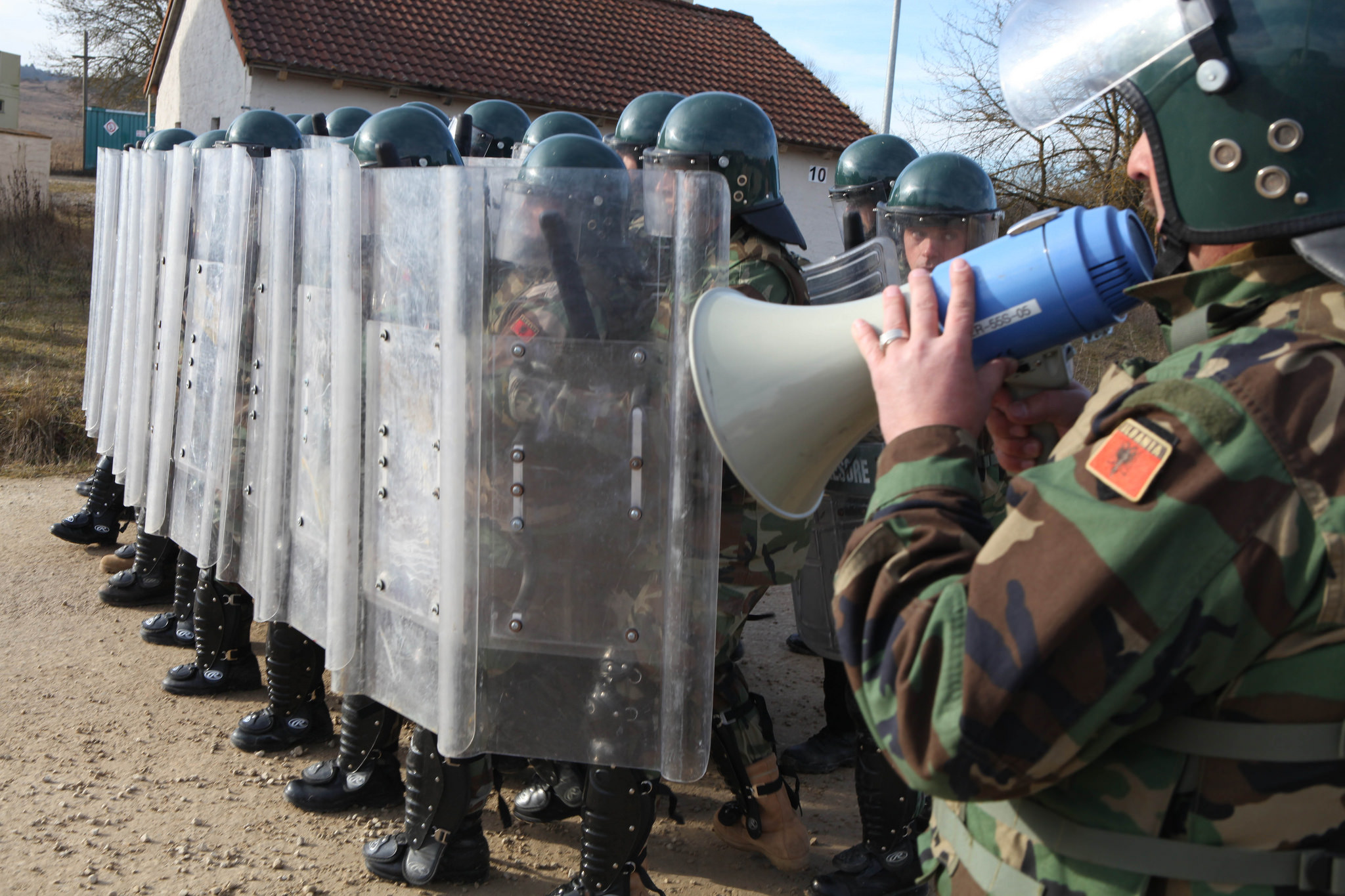
Albanian soldiers react to rioters as part of an exercise, during Kosovo Force

Albanian Armed Forces

- General Staff
- Air Force
- Land Force
- Naval Force
- Military Police
- Support Command

=== Algeria ===
Algerian People's National Army

- Land Forces
- National Navy
- Air Force
- Territorial Air Defence Forces
- National Gendarmerie
- Republican Guard

=== Angola ===
Angolan Armed Forces

- Army
- Navy
- National Air Force
- Presidential Guard Unit

=== Antigua and Barbuda ===
Antigua and Barbuda has the smallest military budget of any nation with a military.

Antigua and Barbuda Defence Force

- Regiment
- Coast Guard
- Cadet Corps
- Service and Support Unit
- Air Wing

=== Argentina ===
Armed Forces of the Argentine Republic

- Army
- Air Force
- Navy
- National Gendarmerie
- Naval Prefecture

=== Armenia ===
Armed Forces of Armenia

- Ground Forces
- Air Force

=== Australia ===
Australian Defence Force

- Air Force
- Army
- Navy

=== Austria ===
Austrian Armed Forces

- Army
- Air Force
- Jagdkommando
- Cyber Forces

=== Azerbaijan ===
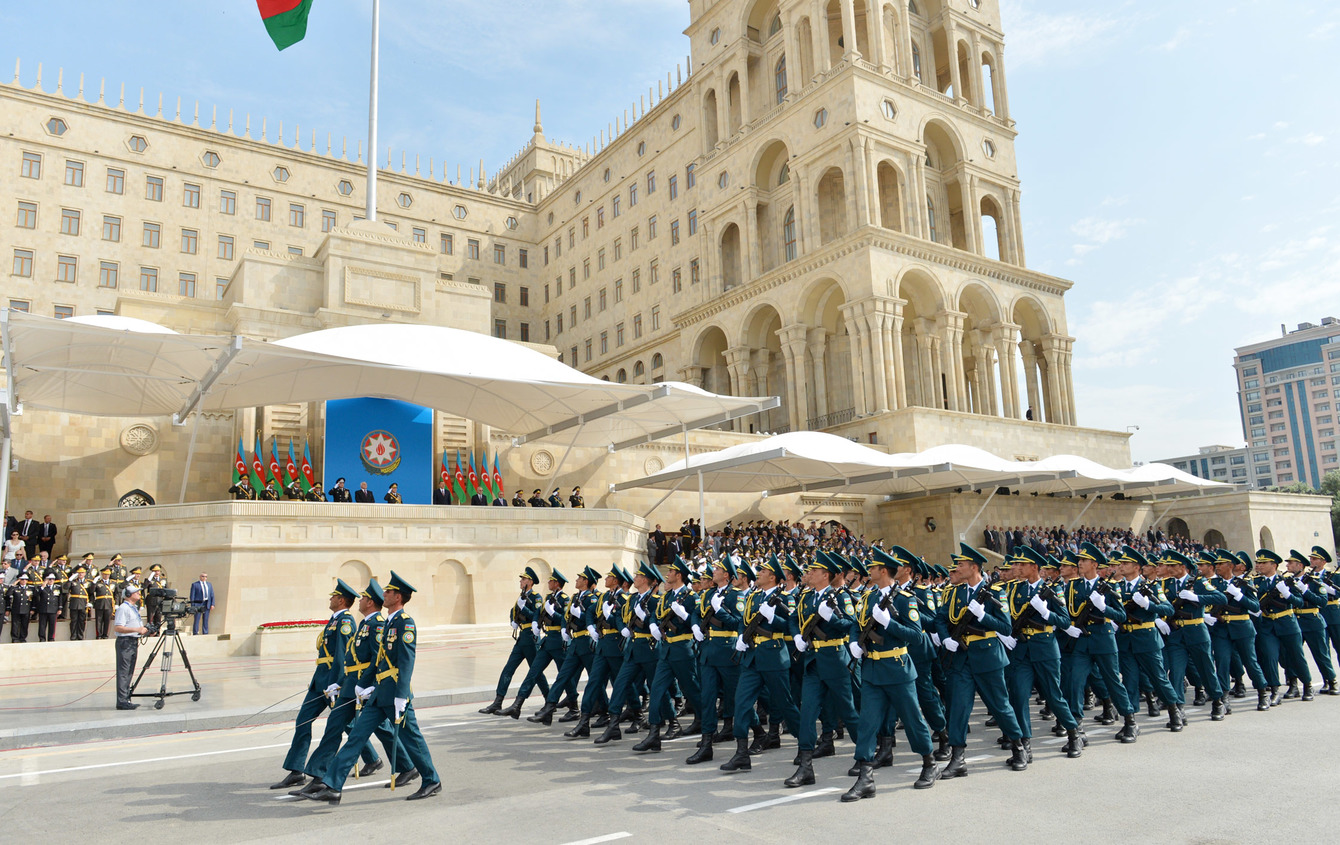
State Border Service guardsmen during a military parade in Baku.

Azerbaijani Armed Forces

- Air Forces
- Land Forces
- Navy

National Guard
Internal Troops
State Border Service

== B ==
=== Bahamas ===
Royal Bahamas Defence Force

=== Bahrain ===
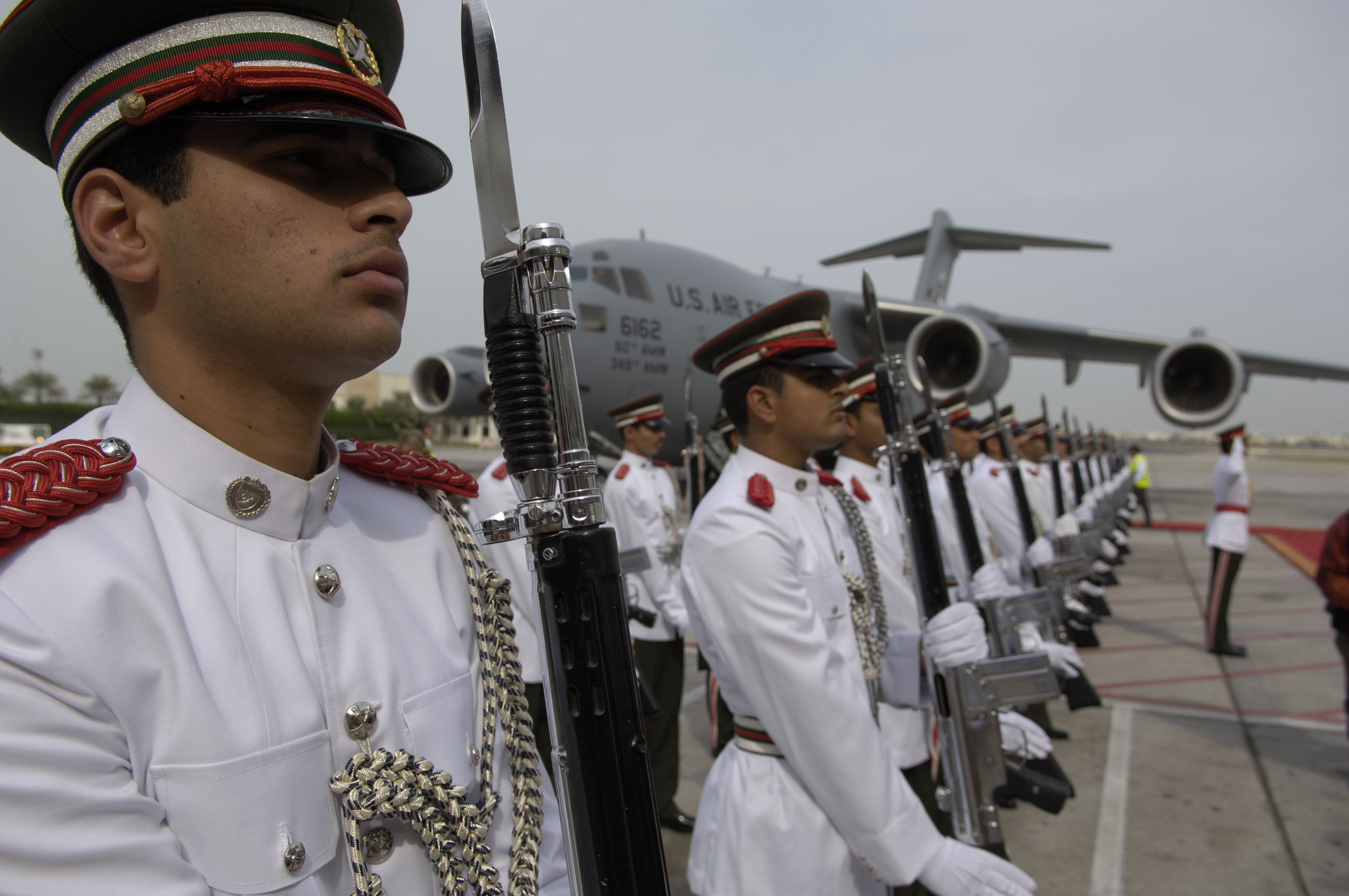
Royal Guards providing a guard of honor during the visit of US Secretary of Defense Robert Gates in December 2007.

Bahrain Defence Force

- Air Force
- Army
- Naval Force
- Medical Services
- Royal Guard

National Guard

=== Bangladesh ===
Bangladesh Armed Forces

- Army
- Navy
- Air Force

Border Guard Bangladesh
Bangladesh Coast Guard
Bangladesh Ansar

=== Barbados ===
Barbados Defence Force

- Regiment
- Coast Guard
- Air Wing

=== Belarus ===
Armed Forces of Belarus

- Ground Forces
- Air Force and Air Defence Forces
- Special Operations Forces
- Transport Troops
- Territorial Defense Troops

=== Belgium ===
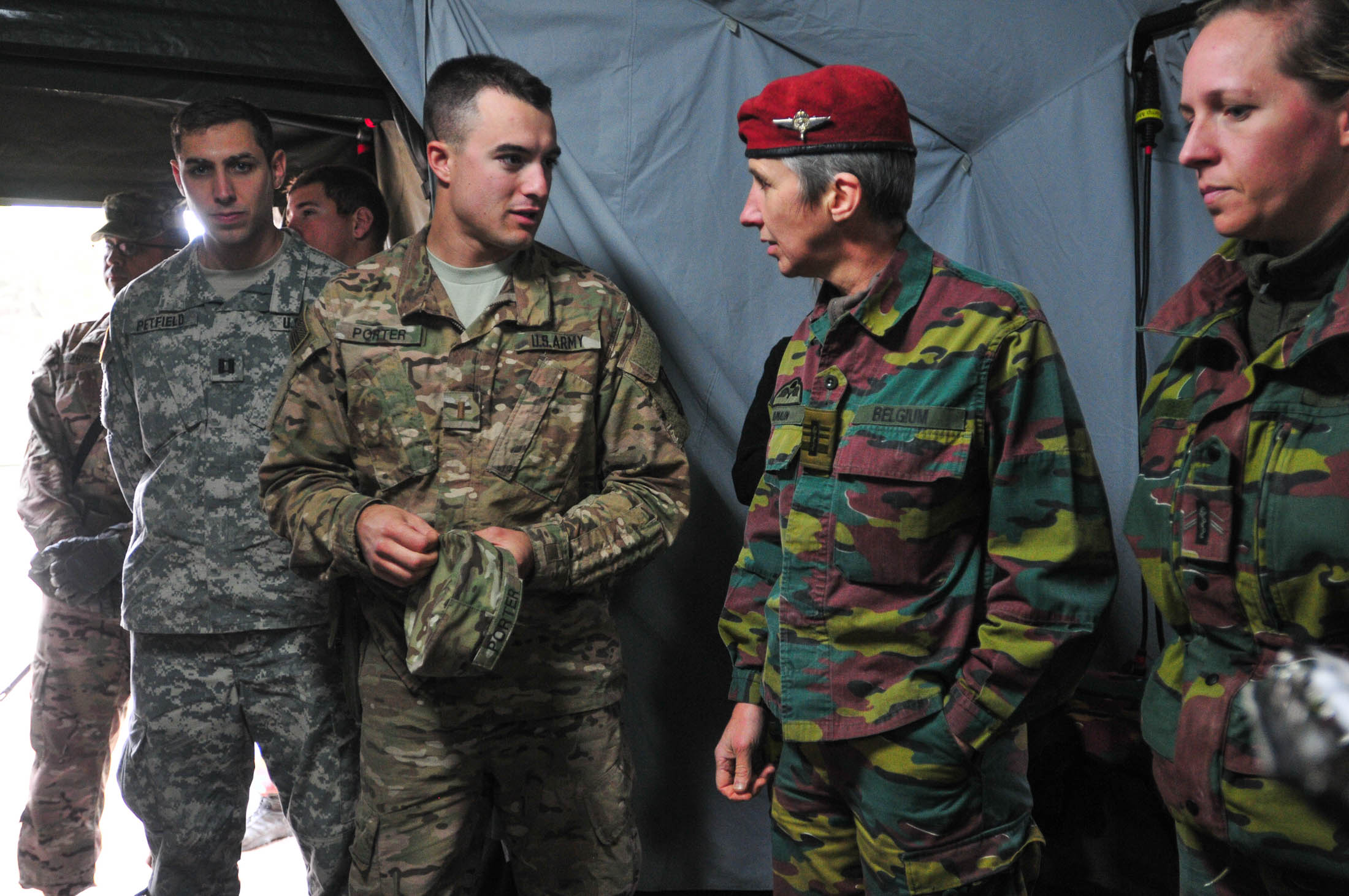
Soldiers from the Belgian Medical Service alongside their US counterparts.

Belgian Armed Forces

- Army
- Air Force
- Navy
- Medical Service
- Cyber Force

=== Belize ===
Belize Defence Force

- Air Wing

Belize Coast Guard

=== Benin ===
Benin Armed Forces

- Army
- Navy
- Air Force
- Republican Guard

=== Bhutan ===
Military of Bhutan

- Army
- Royal Bodyguard
- Police

=== Bolivia ===
Armed Forces of Bolivia

- Army
- Air Force
- Navy

=== Bosnia and Herzegovina ===
Armed Forces of Bosnia and Herzegovina

- Ground Forces
- Air Force and Anti-Aircraft Defence

=== Botswana ===
Botswana Defence Force

- Ground Force
- Air Arm Command

=== Brazil ===
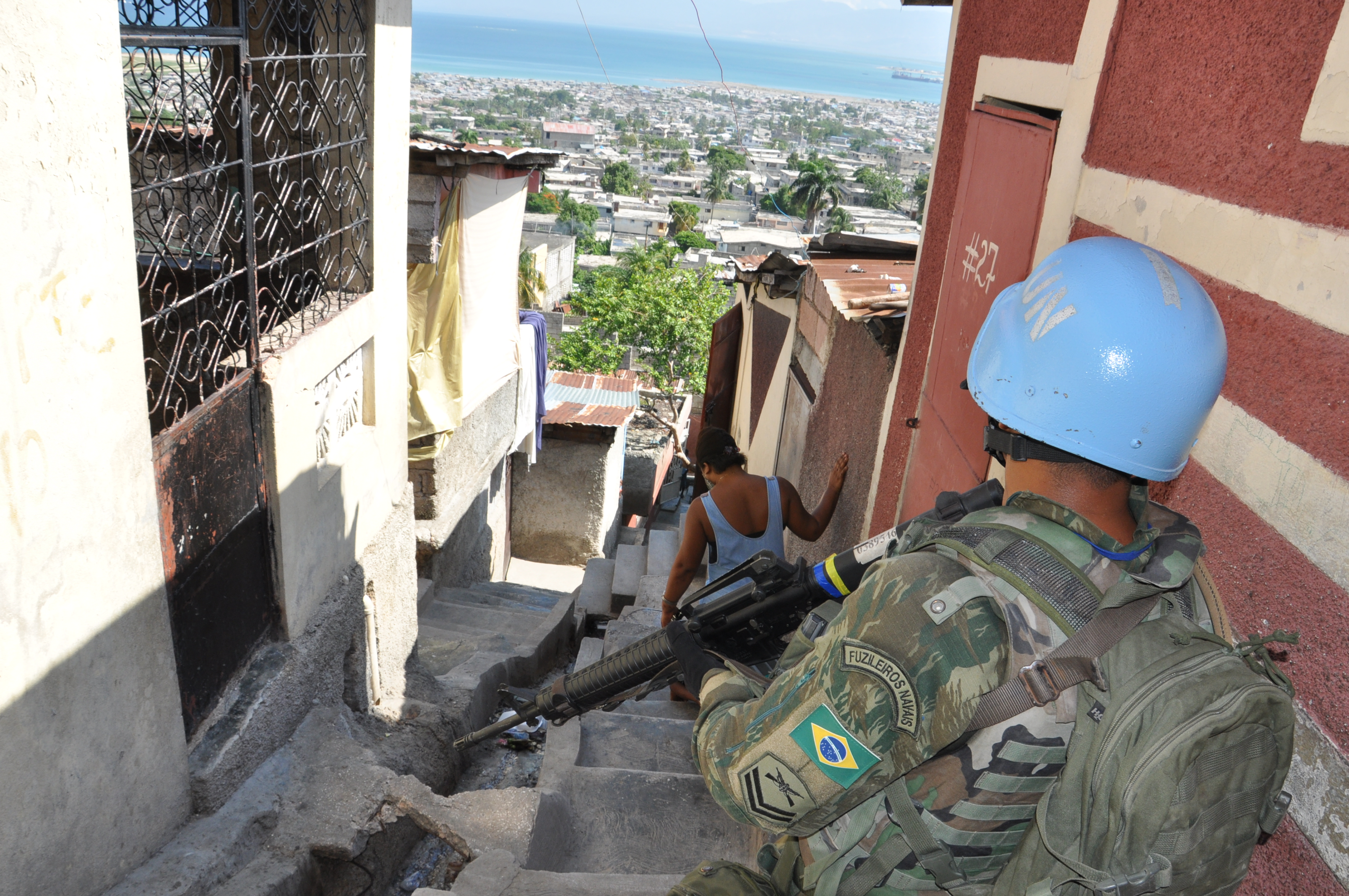
Brazilian Marines deployed as part of the peacekeeping mission in Haiti

Brazilian Armed Forces

- Army
- Air Force
- Navy
  - Marine Corps
- Military Police
- Military Firefighters Corps

=== Brunei ===
Royal Brunei Armed Forces

- Land Force
- Air Force
- Navy

=== Bulgaria ===
Bulgarian Armed Forces

- Land Forces
- Air Force
- Navy

Gendarmerie

=== Burkina Faso ===
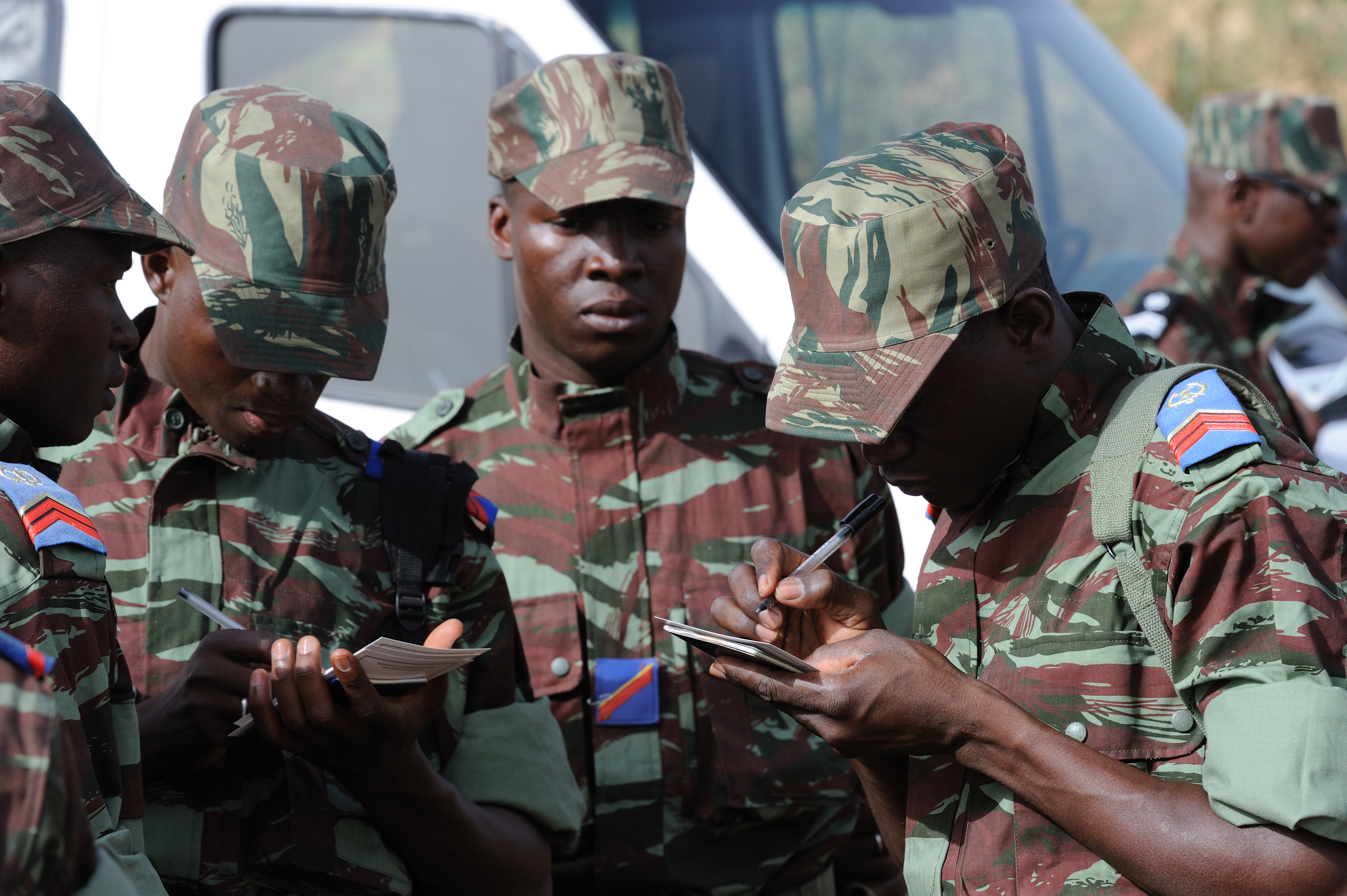
Burkinabe Soldiers before deployment to an exercise in Mali

Burkina Faso Armed Forces

- Army
- Air Force
- National Gendarmerie
- People's Militia

=== Burundi ===
National Defence Force

- Ground Force
- Air Force
- Naval Force

== C ==
=== Cambodia ===
Royal Cambodian Armed Forces

- Army
- Air Force
- Navy
- Royal Gendarmerie

=== Cameroon ===
Cameroon Armed Forces

- Army
- Air Force
- Navy
- Fire Fighter Corps
- National Gendarmerie

=== Canada ===
Canadian Armed Forces

- Army
  - Canadian Rangers
- Air Force
- Navy

=== Cape Verde ===
Cape Verdean Armed Forces

- National Guard
- Coast Guard

=== Central African Republic ===
Central African Armed Forces

- Ground Forces
- Air Force
- National Gendarmerie
- Republican Guard
- National Police

=== Chad ===
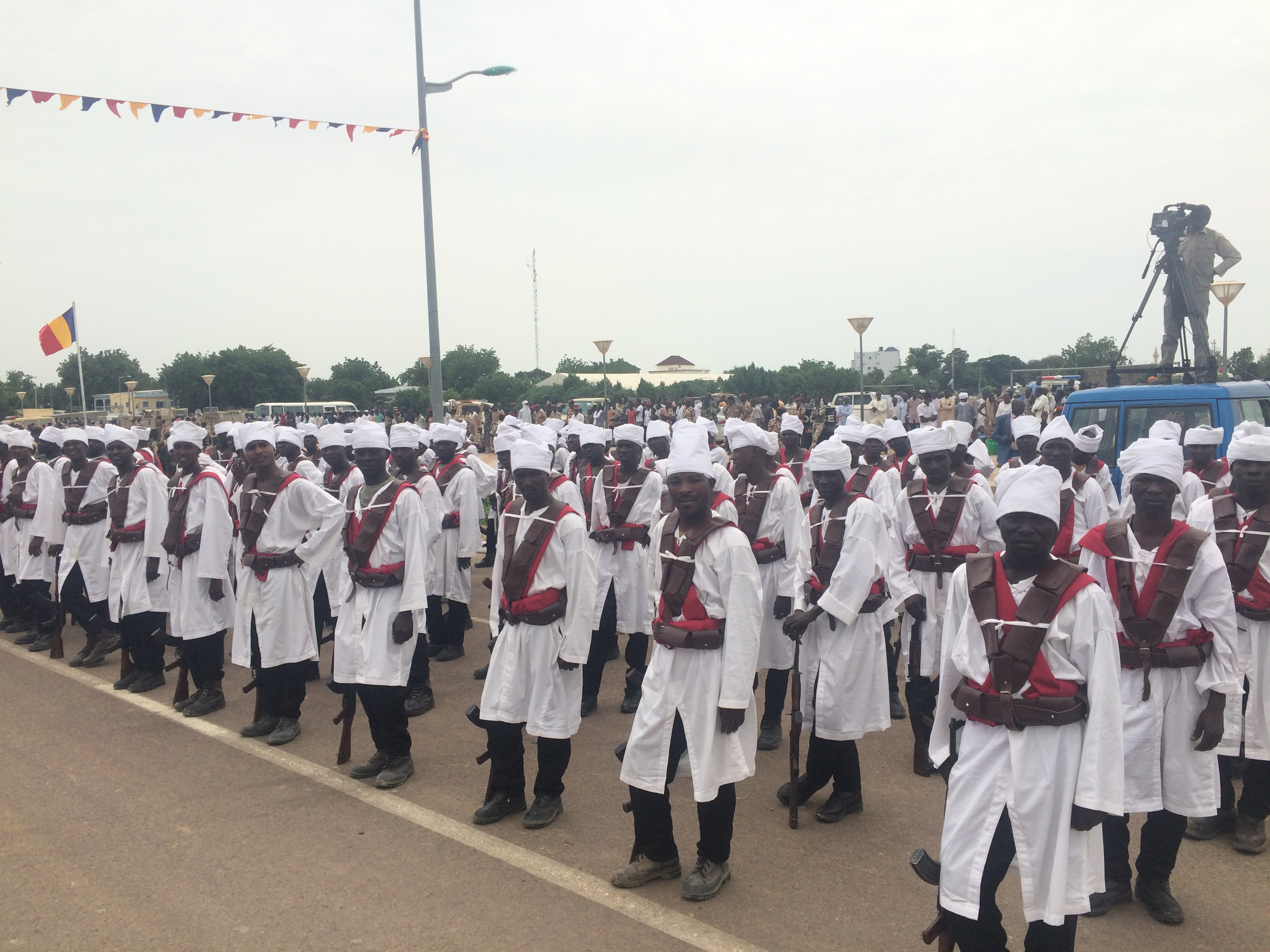
The National and Nomadic Guard of Chad during the 2019 Independence Day military parade in N'Djamena

Chad National Army

- Air Force
- Ground Forces

National and Nomadic Guard
National Gendarmerie

=== Chile ===
Chile Armed Forces

- Army
- Navy
- Air Force

Carabineros
Gendarmerie

=== China ===
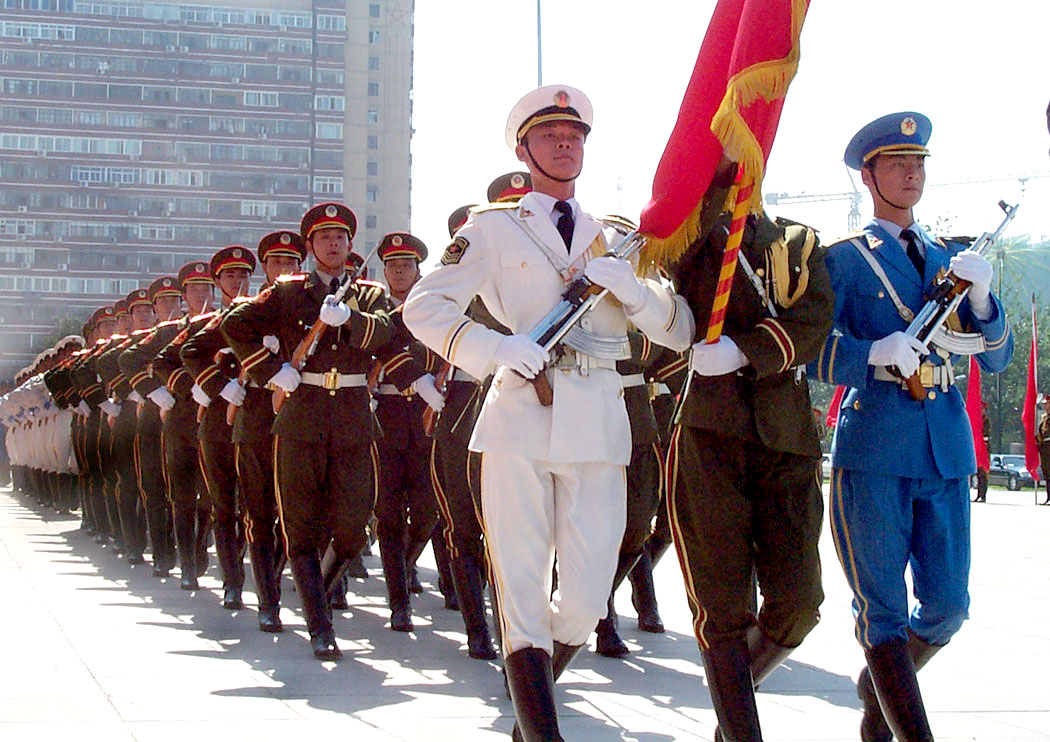
The People's Liberation Army tri-service color guard

People's Liberation Army

- Ground Force
- Air Force
- Navy
- Rocket Force
- Aerospace Force
- Cyberspace Force
- Information Support Force
- Joint Logistics Support Force

People's Armed Police

- Coast Guard

Militia

=== Colombia ===
Military Forces of Colombia

- National Army
- Navy
  - Naval Infantry
- Aerospace Force
- National Police

=== Comoros ===
Army of National Development

=== Democratic Republic of the Congo ===
Armed Forces of the Democratic Republic of the Congo

- Air Force
- Land Forces
- Navy
- Republican Guard

=== Republic of the Congo ===
Armed Forces of the Republic of the Congo

- Army
- Air Force
- Navy
- Gendarmerie

=== Croatia ===
Armed Forces of Croatia

- Army
- Navy
- Air Force
- Special Operations Forces Command

=== Cuba ===
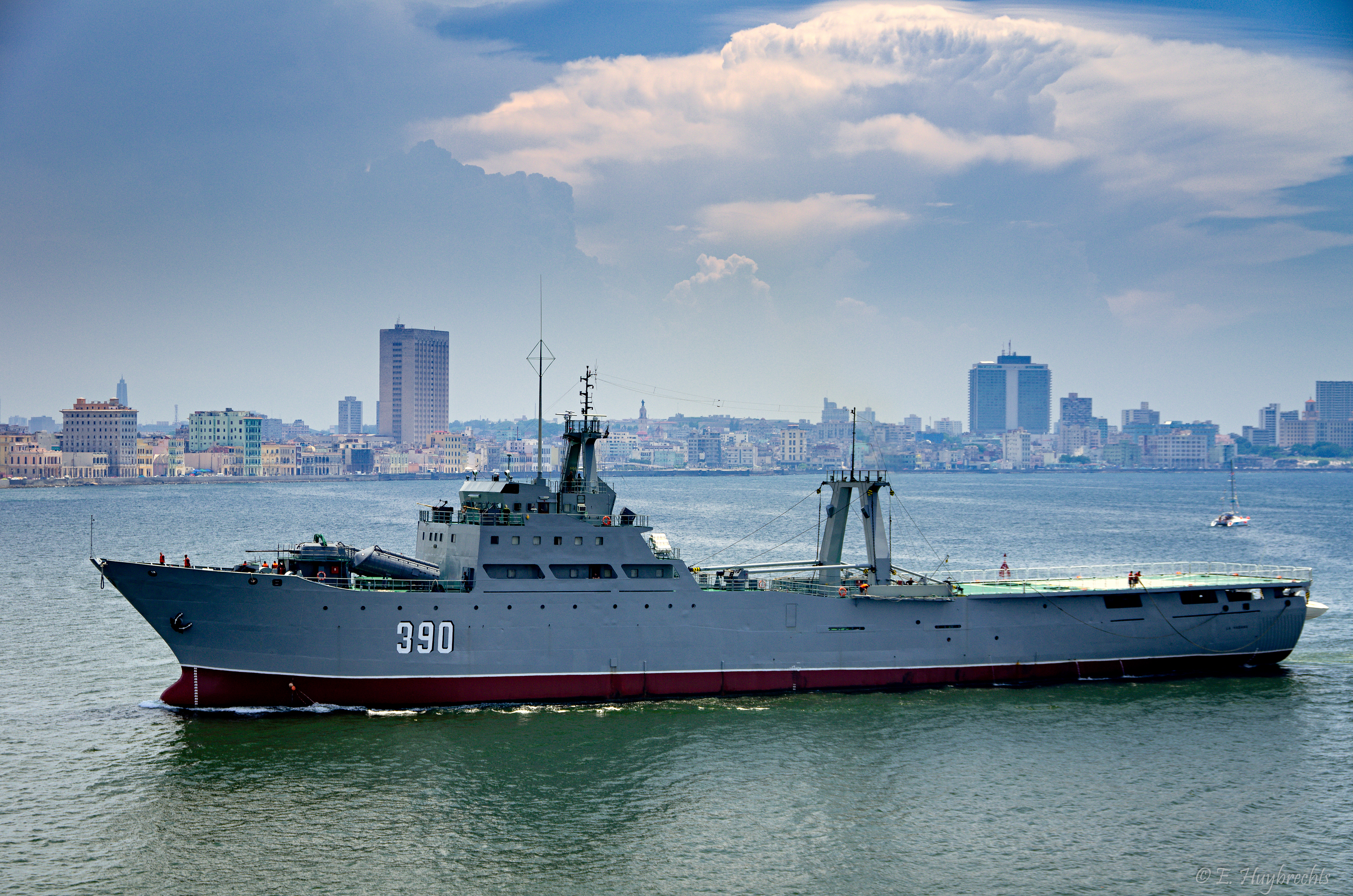
The helicopter carrier patrol vessel Rio Damuji n° 390 of the Cuban Navy in Havana, 2011

Cuban Revolutionary Armed Forces

- Army
- Navy
- Air and Air Defense Force
- Territorial Troops Militia

=== Cyprus ===
Cypriot National Guard

- Ground Forces
- Air Command
- Naval Command

=== Czech Republic ===
Czech Armed Forces

- Land Forces
- Air Force
- Territorial Forces
- Information and Cyber Forces
- Special Forces

== D ==
=== Denmark ===
Danish Armed Forces

- Army
- Air Force
- Navy
- Home Guard

=== Djibouti ===
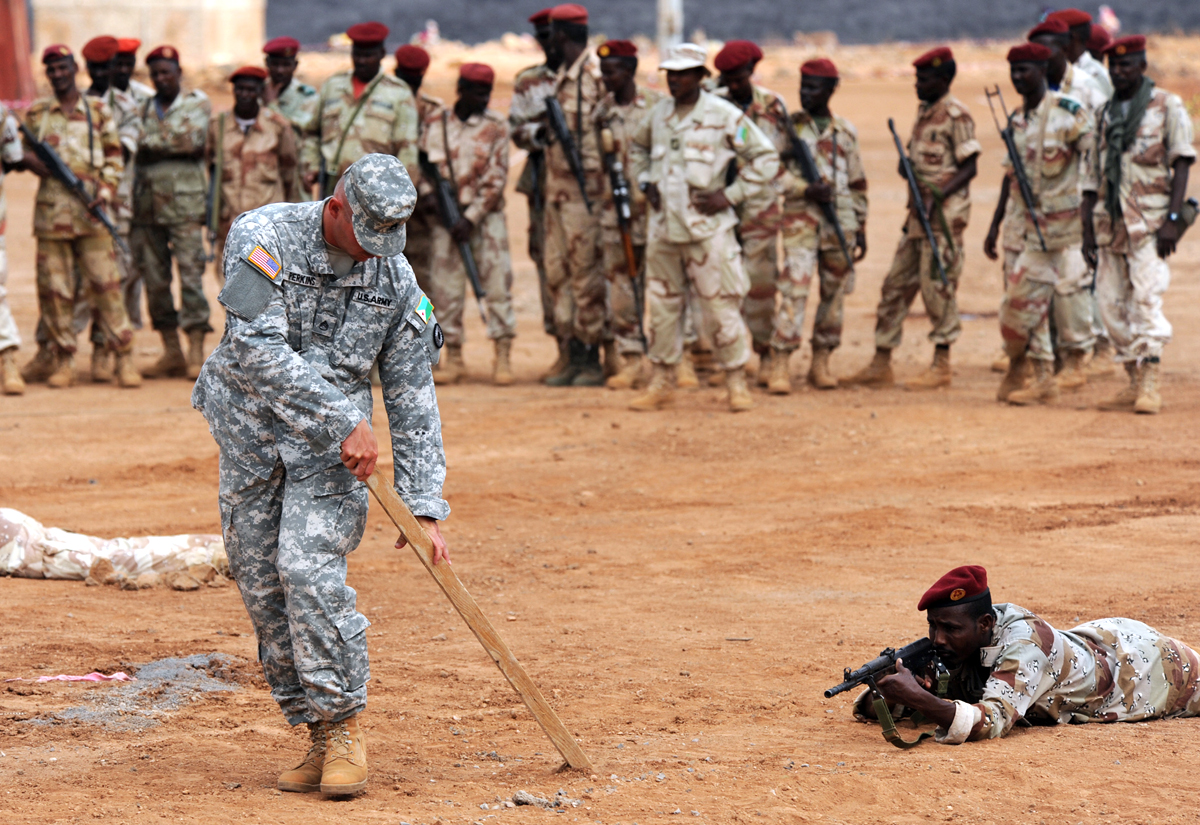
Djiboutian Army Quick Reaction Regiment training at Ali Oune

Djibouti Armed Forces

- Air Force
- Army
- Navy
- National Gendarmerie
- Republican Guard

=== Dominican Republic ===
Armed Forces of the Dominican Republic

- Army
- Air Force
- Navy

== E ==
=== East Timor ===
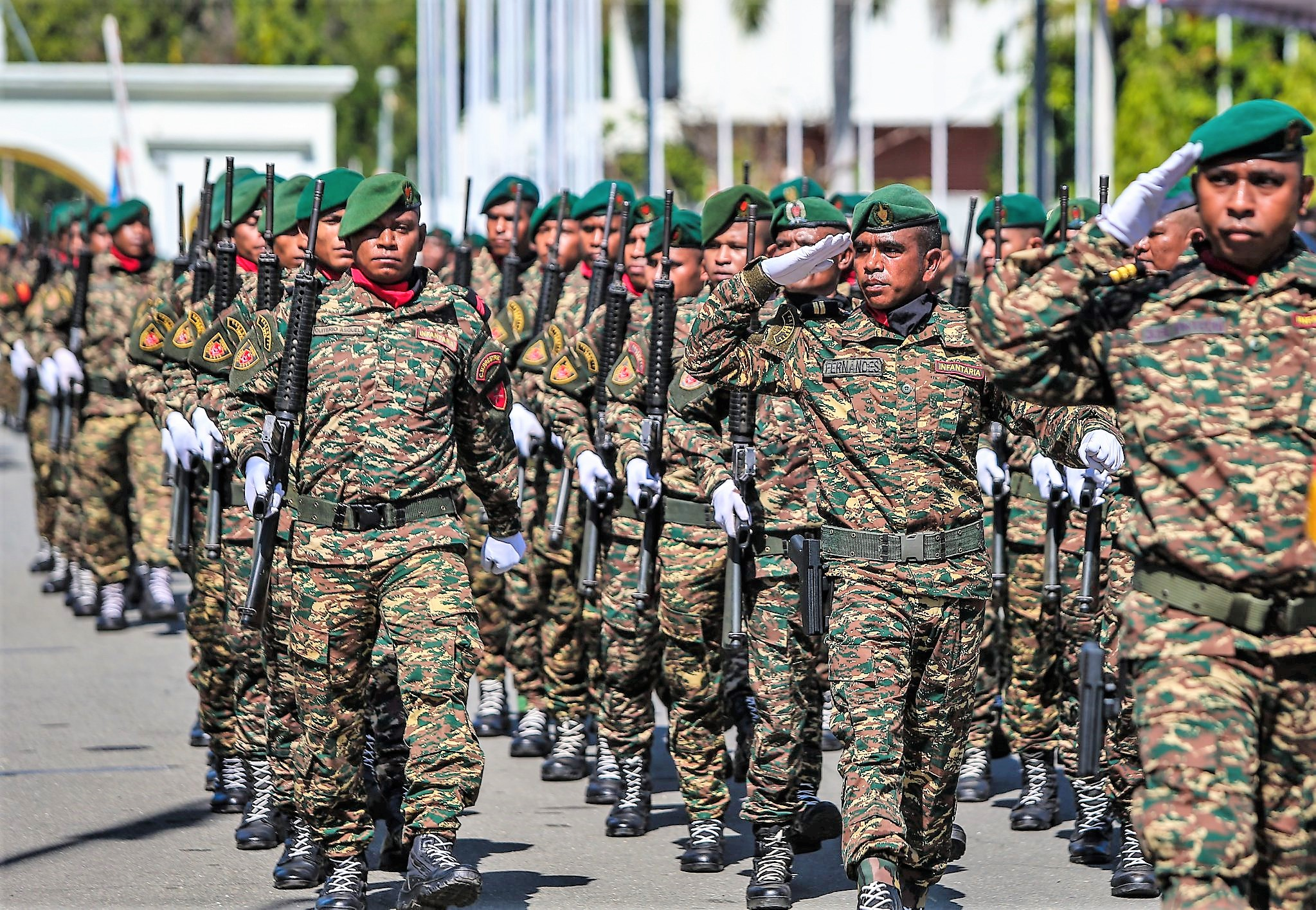
East Timorese soldiers during a parade in 2019

Timor Leste Defence Force

- Timor-Leste Army
- Timor-Leste Naval Component
- Timor-Leste Air Component

=== Ecuador ===
Armed Forces of Ecuador

- Army
- Air Force
- Navy

=== Egypt ===
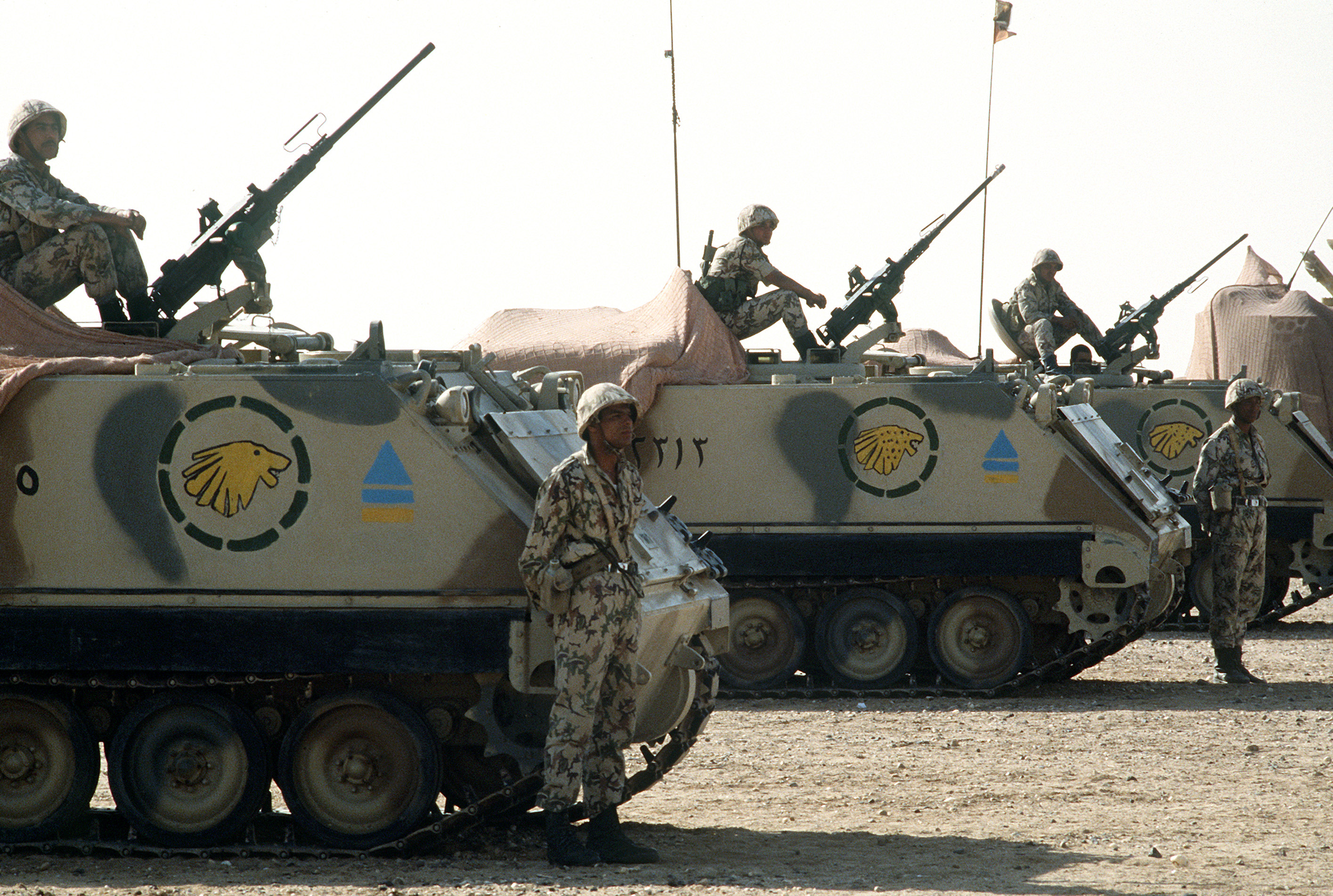
Egyptian soldiers with M113 armored personnel carriers during a demonstration for visiting dignitaries, part of Operation Desert Shield.

Egyptian Armed Forces

- Army
- Air Force
- Navy
- Air Defense Forces

=== El Salvador ===
Armed Forces of El Salvador

- Army
- Navy
- Air Force

=== Equatorial Guinea ===
Armed Forces of Equatorial Guinea

- Navy
- Army
- Air Force

=== Eritrea ===
Eritrean Defence Forces

- Army
- Air Force
- Navy

=== Estonia ===
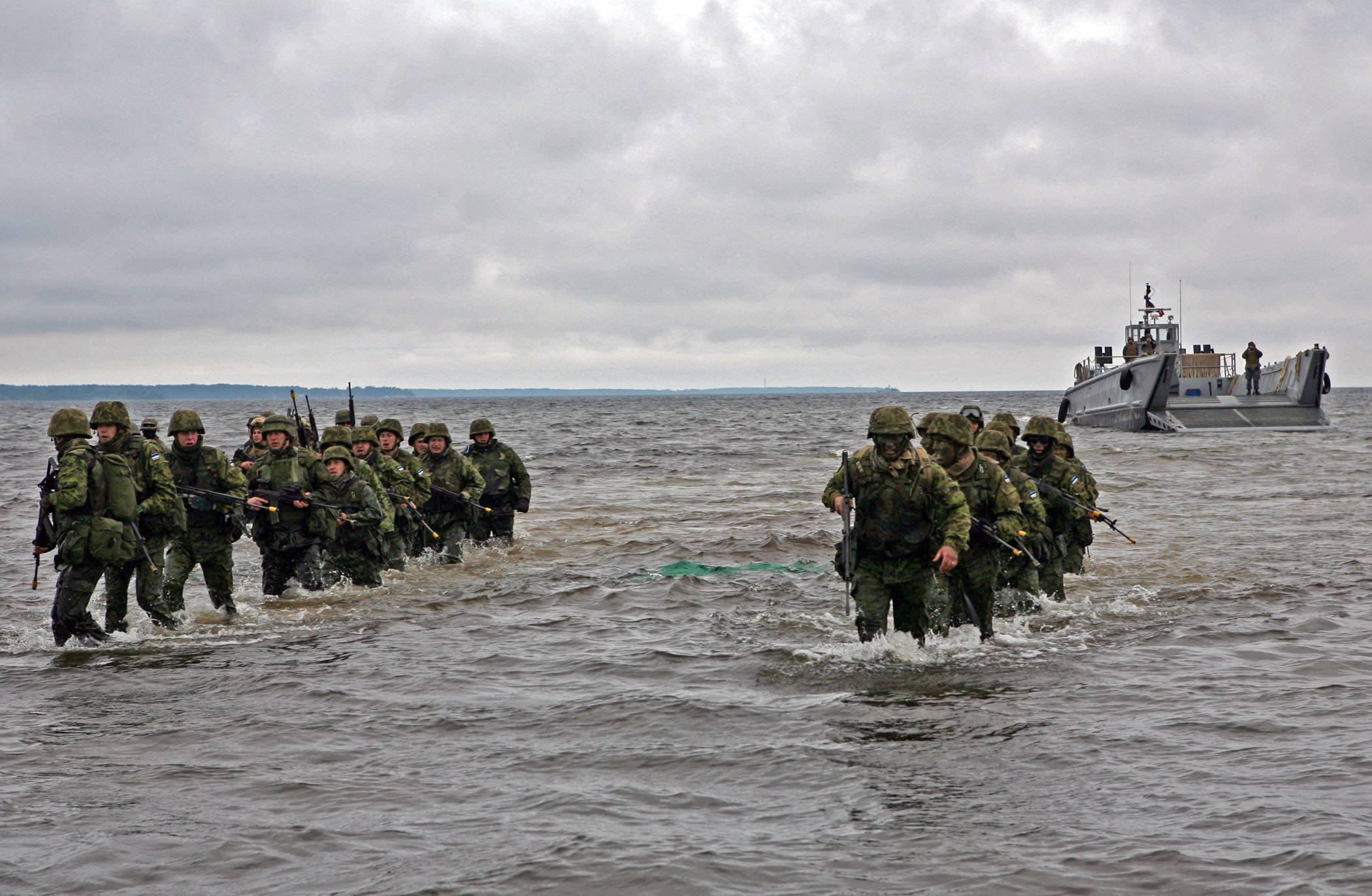
Estonian Defence League troops in joint exercise with US marines in 2010

Estonian Defence Forces

- Land Forces
- Air Force
- Navy
- Defence League

=== Ethiopia ===
Ethiopian National Defense Force

- Ground Forces
- Air Force
- Navy
- Republican Guard

== F ==
=== Fiji ===
Republic of Fiji Military Forces

- Fiji Infantry Regiment
- Republic of Fiji Navy

=== Finland ===
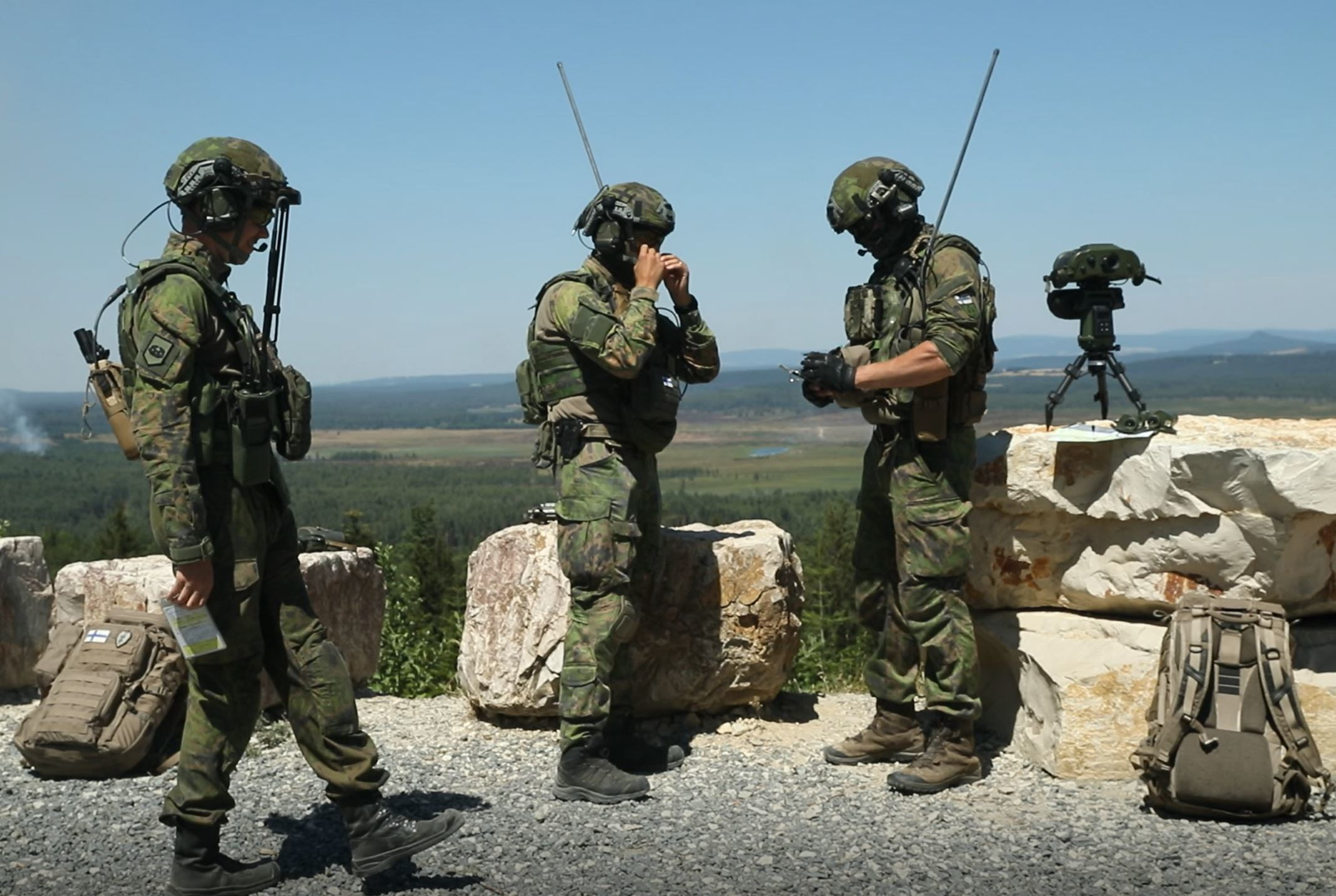
Finnish soldiers during Exercise Dynamic Front 2022

Finnish Defence Forces

- Army
- Air Force
- Navy
- Local Defence companies

Finnish Border Guard

=== France ===
French Armed Forces

- Army
- Air and Space Force
- Navy
- National Gendarmerie
- National Guard

== G ==
=== Gabon ===
Armed Forces of Gabon

- Army
- Air Force
- Navy
- National Gendarmerie
- Republican Guard

=== Gambia ===
Gambia Armed Forces

- National Army
- Navy
- Republican National Guard

=== Georgia ===
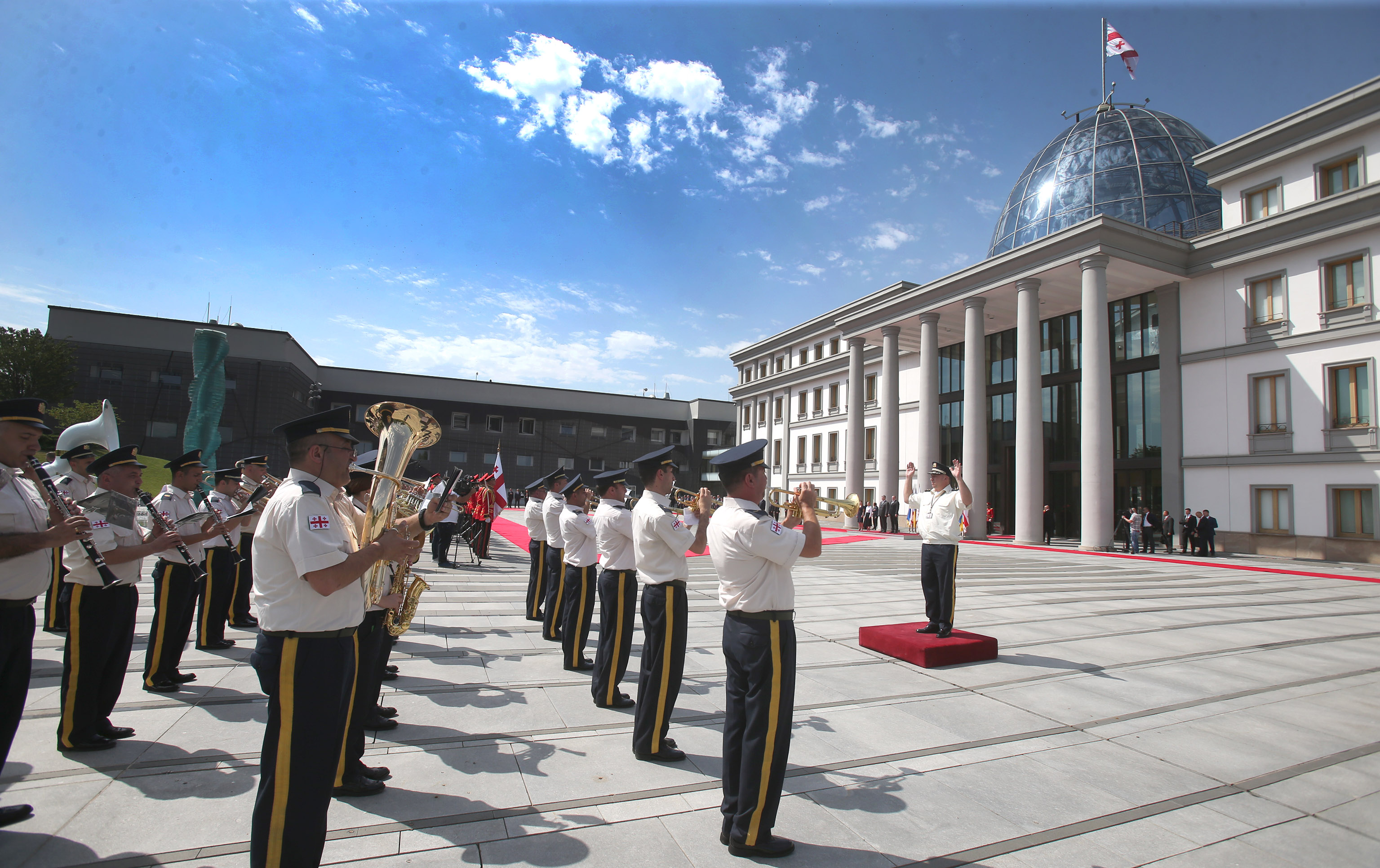
The military band of the Georgian National Guard

Defense Forces of Georgia

- Land Forces
- Air Force
- Coast Guard
- Special Operations Forces
- National Guard

=== Germany, Federal Republic of ===
Bundeswehr

- Army
- Navy
- Air Force
- Joint Support Service
- Joint Medical Service
- Cyber and Information Domain Service

=== Ghana ===
Ghana Armed Forces

- Army
- Air Force
- Navy

=== Greece ===
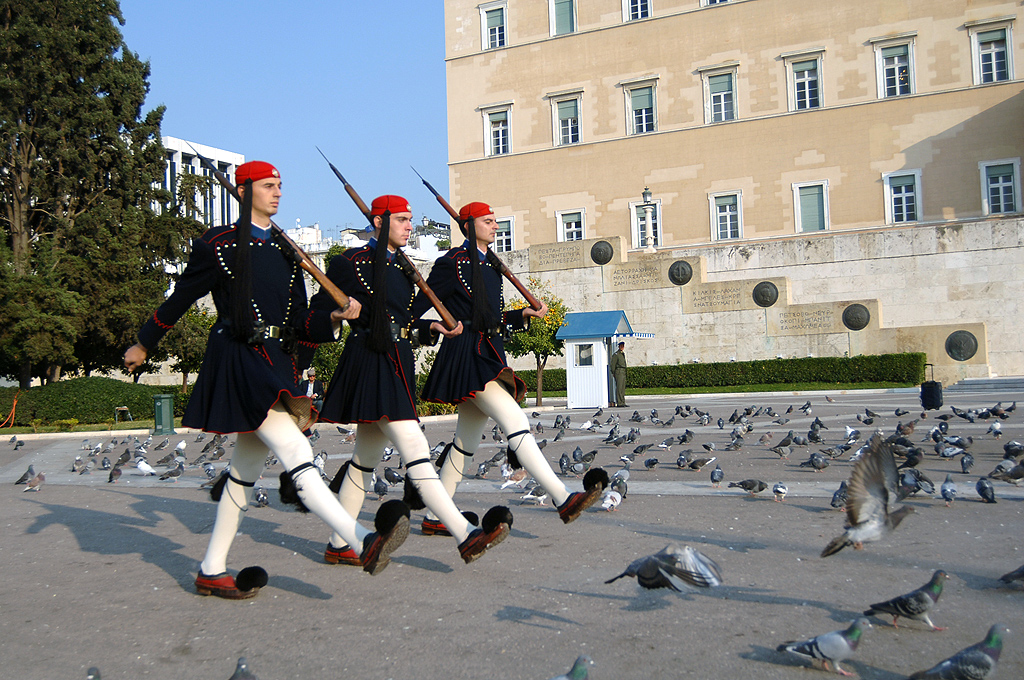
Evzones of the Greek Army in winter everyday dress arrive for the changing of the guard, 2009

Hellenic Armed Forces

- Army
  - Army Aviation
  - National Guard
  - Presidential Guard
  - Special Forces
- Navy
- Air Force

=== Guatemala ===
Armed Forces of Guatemala

- Army
- Air Force
- Navy
- Presidential Honor Guard

=== Guinea ===
Republic of Guinea Armed Forces

- People's Army
- Air Force
- Navy
- Republican Guard

=== Guinea-Bissau ===
Revolutionary Armed Forces of the People (Guinea-Bissau)

- Army
- Air Force
- Navy

=== Guyana ===
Guyana Defence Force

- Army
- Air Corps
- Coast Guard

== H ==
=== Haiti ===
Armed Forces of Haiti

- Army
- Aviation Corps
- Navy

=== Honduras ===
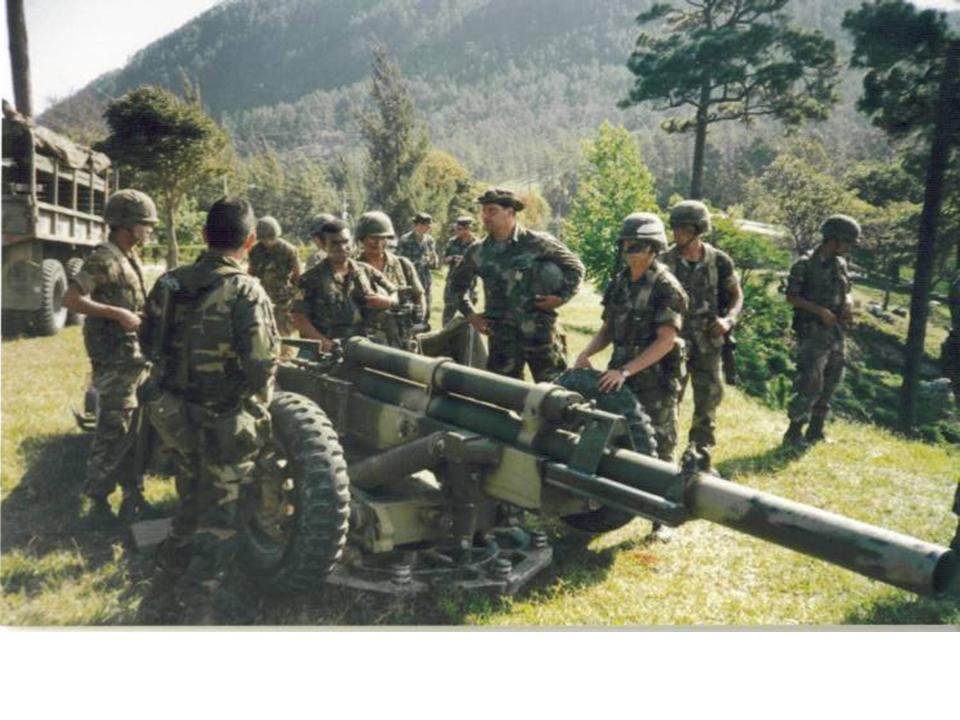
Honduran Army gunners together with United States trainers from the 5-206th Field Artillery in field exercises in the Francisco Morazán Department

Armed Forces of Honduras

- Army
- Air Force
- Navy
- Military Police

=== Hungary ===
Hungarian Defence Forces

- Ground Forces
  - River Guard
- Air Force

== I ==
=== India ===
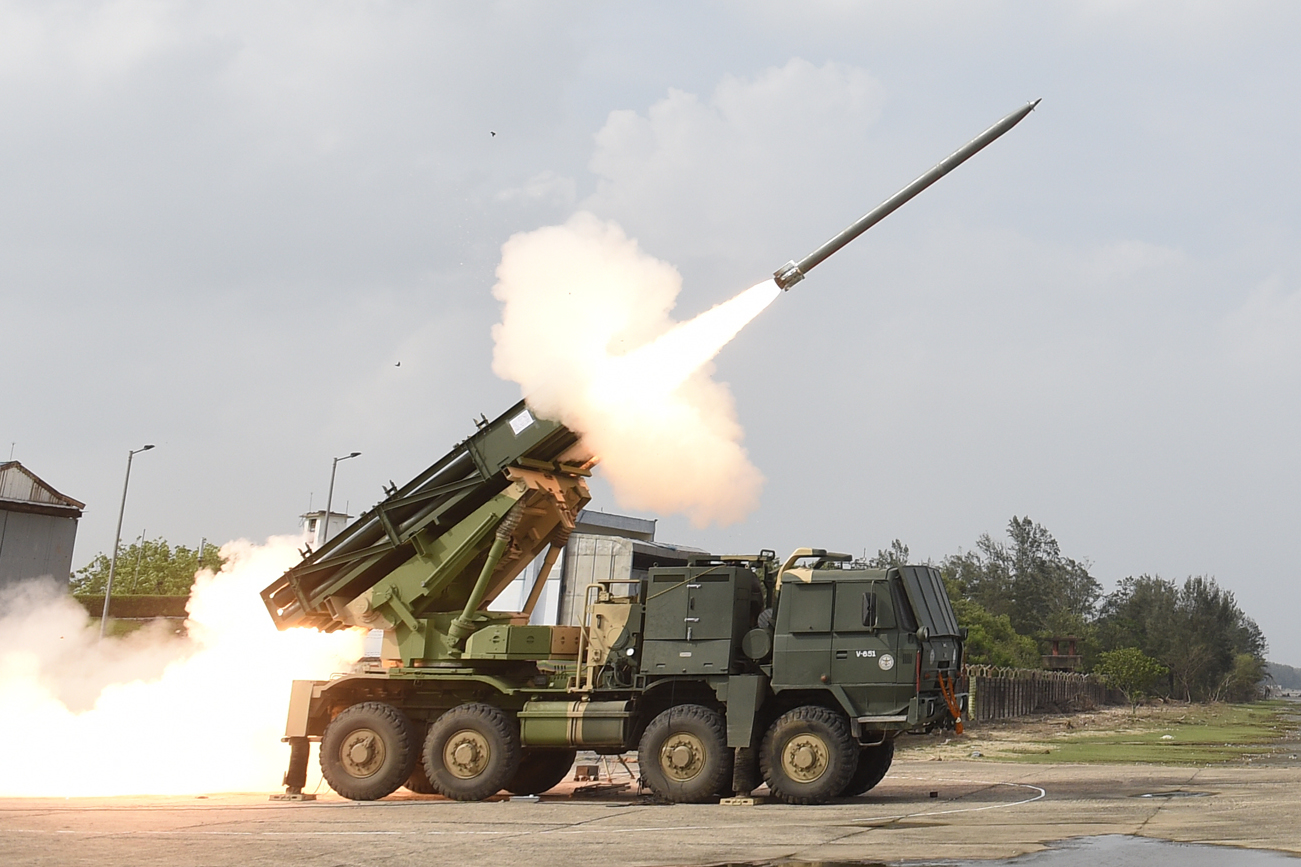
India has the fourth-largest military and the sixth-largest nuclear arsenal in the world.

Indian Armed Forces

- Army
- Navy
- Air Force
- Border Roads Organisation

Coast Guard
Paramilitary forces

- Central Armed Police Forces
  - Assam Rifles
  - Border Security Force
  - Indo-Tibetan Border Police
  - Sashastra Seema Bal
  - National Security Guard
  - Central Industrial Security Force
  - Central Reserve Police Force
- Railway Protection Force
- Special Frontier Force
- Special Protection Group

=== Indonesia ===
Indonesian National Armed Forces

- Army
- Navy
  - Marine Corps
- Air Force

=== Iran ===
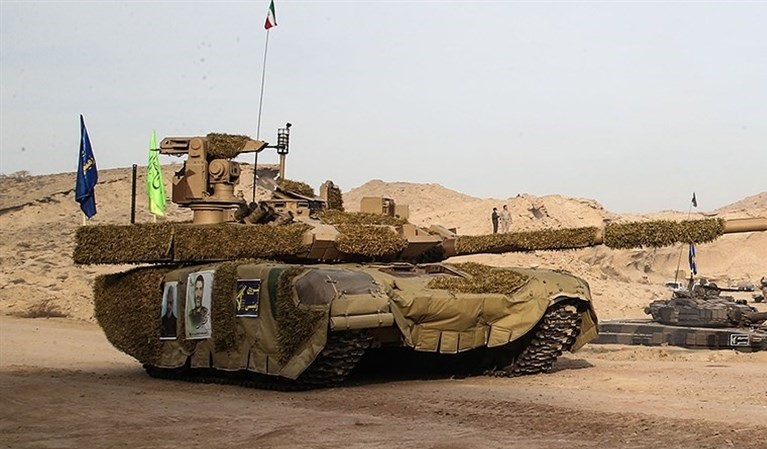
Karrar main battle tank of the IRGC Ground Forces, participating in the Great Prophet XVII military exercise

Iranian Armed Forces

- Islamic Republic of Iran Army
  - Ground Forces
  - Air Force
  - Navy
  - Air Defense Force
- Islamic Revolutionary Guard Corps
  - Ground Forces
  - Aerospace Force
  - Navy
  - Quds Force
  - Basij
- Islamic Republic of Iran Police Command

=== Iraq ===
Iraqi Armed Forces

- Ground Forces
- Air Force
- Navy
- Counter Terrorism Service
- Air Defence Command
- Popular Mobilization Forces (de jure, all members are de facto under Iran's command)

Kurdistan Region

- Peshmerga

=== Ireland ===
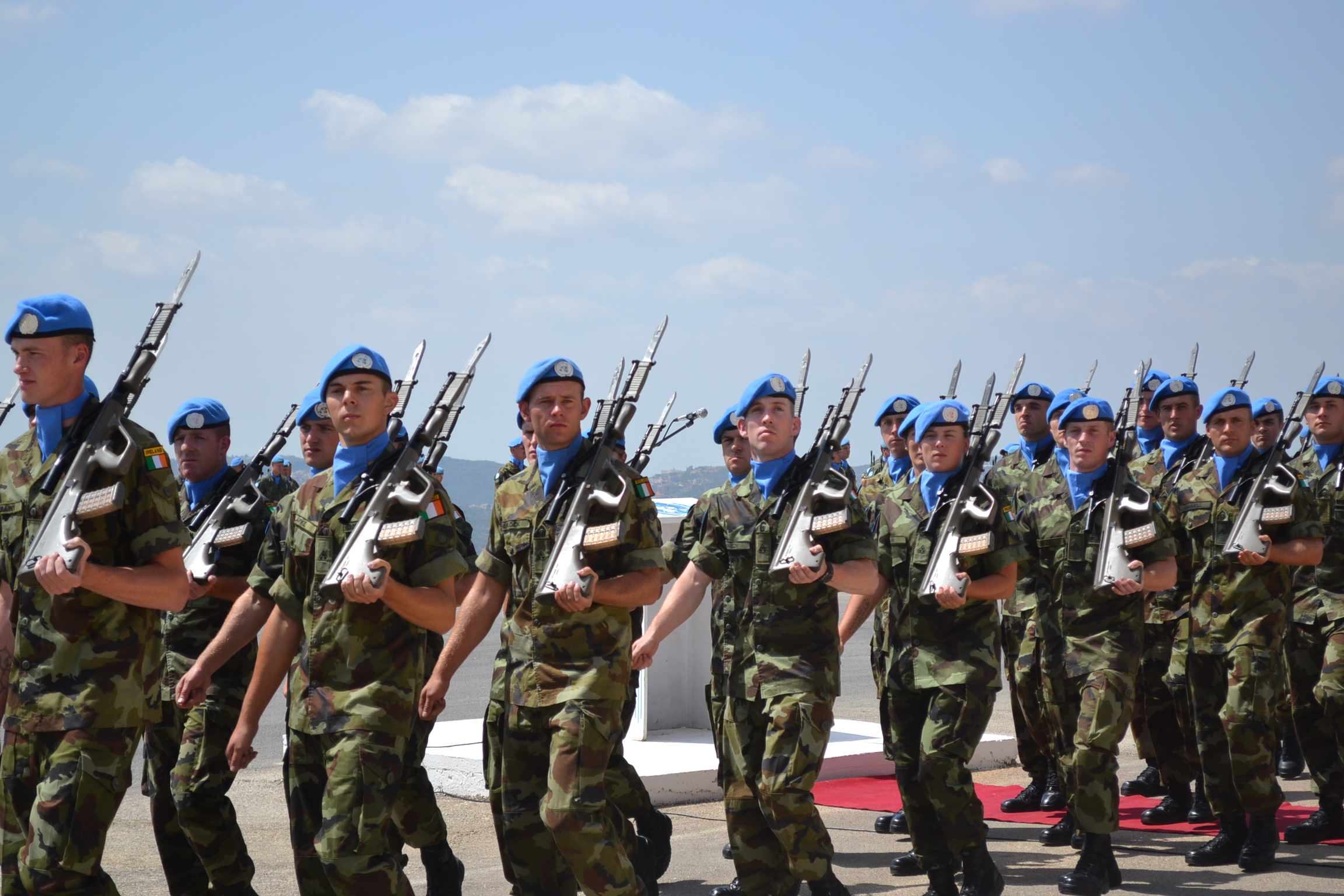
Irish troops serving with UNIFIL in 2013

Defence Forces

- Army
- Air Corps
- Naval Service
- Reserve Defence Forces

=== Israel ===
Israel Defense Forces

- Ground Forces
- Air Force
- Navy

=== Italy ===
Italian Armed Forces

- Army
- Navy
- Air Force
- Carabinieri

=== Ivory Coast ===
Armed Forces of the Republic of Ivory Coast

- Republican Guard
- Army
- Air Force
- Navy
- National Gendarmerie

== J ==
=== Jamaica ===
Jamaica Defence Force

- Regiment
- Maritime, Air and Cyber Command
- Support Brigade
- Caribbean Military Academy
- National Reserve

=== Japan ===
Japan Self-Defense Forces

- Ground Self-Defense Force
- Maritime Self-Defense Force
- Air Self-Defense Force

=== Jordan ===
Jordanian Armed Forces

- Army
- Air Force
- Navy

== K ==
=== Kazakhstan ===
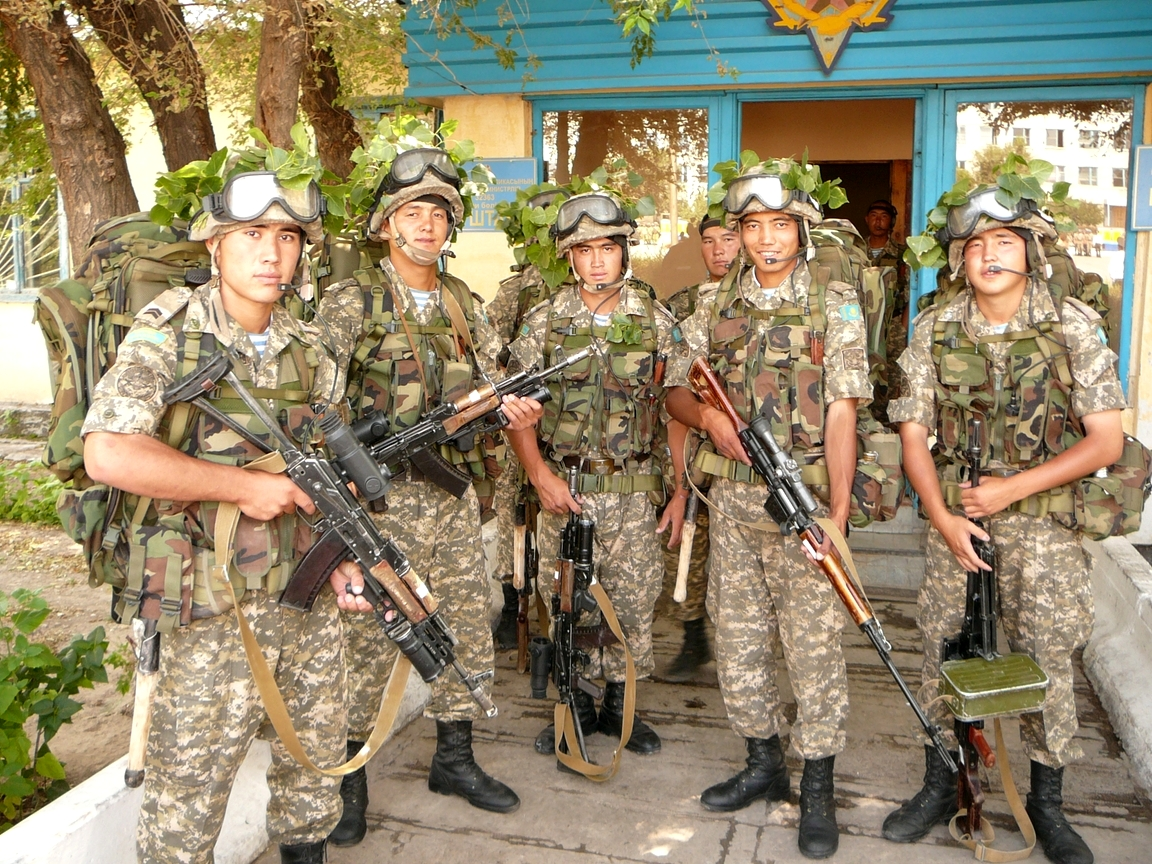
Paratroopers of the 35th Guards Air Assault Brigade of the Kazakh Air Assault Forces.

Armed Forces of the Republic of Kazakhstan

- Ground Forces
  - Rocket and Artillery Forces
- Air Defense Forces
- Naval Forces
- Air Assault Forces
- Special Operations Forces

National Guard
Border Service
State Security Service
Territorial Troops

=== Kenya ===
Kenya Defence Forces

- Army
- Air Force
- Navy

=== Korea ===
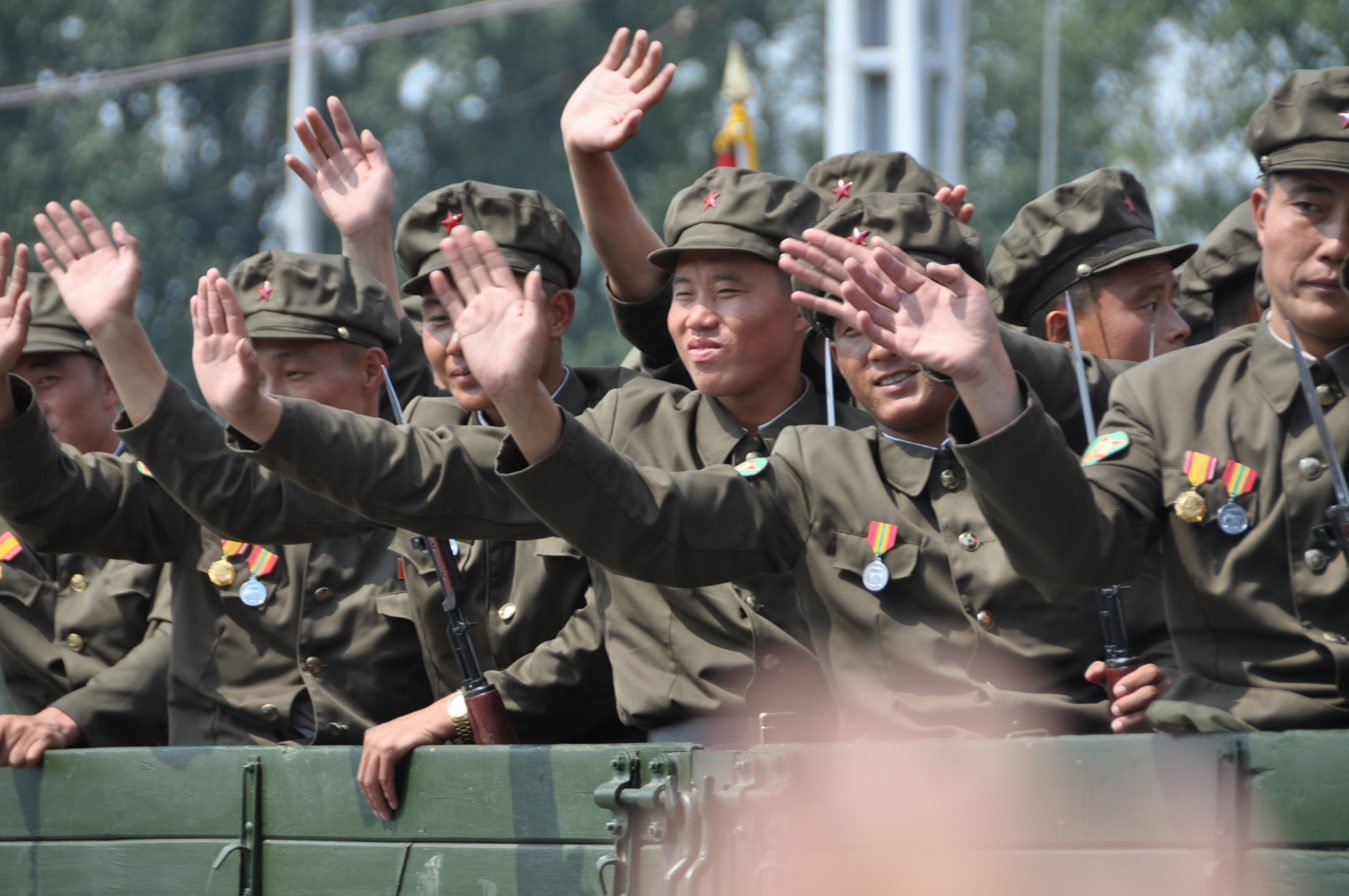
Worker-Peasant Red Guards in Pyongyang during the 2013 Day of the Foundation of the Republic.

North Korea

- Korean People's Army
  - Ground Force
  - Air Force
  - Navy
  - Strategic Force
  - Special Operation Force
  - Missile Administration
- Reserve Military Training Units
- Worker-Peasant Red Guards

South Korea

- Republic of Korea Armed Forces
  - Army
  - Air Force
  - Navy
    - Marine Corps

=== Kuwait ===
Kuwait Military Forces

- Army
- Air Force
- Naval Force
- National Guard

=== Kyrgyzstan ===
Armed Forces of the Republic of Kyrgyzstan

- Air Force
- Army
- National Guard
- State Border Guard Service
- Internal Troops

== L ==
=== Laos ===
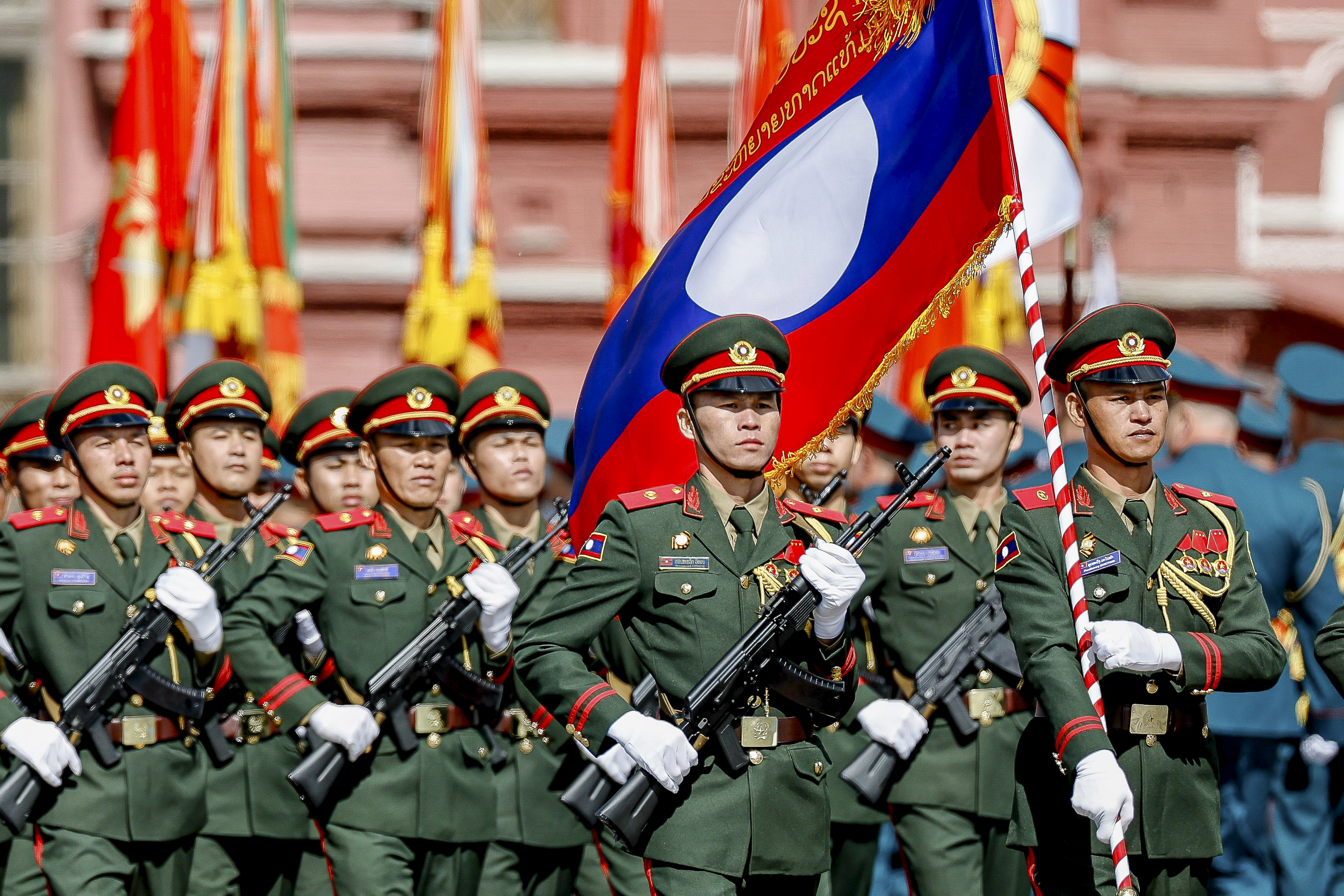
Lao People's Armed Forces on Red Square in Moscow during the Victory Day parade on 9 May 2025

Lao People's Armed Forces

- Army
- Air Force
- Navy

=== Latvia ===
Latvian National Armed Forces

- Land Forces
- Naval Forces
- Air Force
- National Guard

=== Lebanon ===
Lebanese Armed Forces

- Army
- Air Force
- Navy
- Special Operations Command
- Republican Guard

=== Lesotho ===
Lesotho Defence Force

- Army
- Air Wing

=== Liberia ===
Members of the Liberian National Guard at the inauguration of President William Tolbert in 1976

Armed Forces of Liberia

- 23rd Infantry Brigade
- Air Wing
- Coast Guard

=== Libya ===
Libyan Armed Forces - (Government of National Unity)

- Army
- Air Force
- Navy
- Coast Guard

Libyan Arab Armed Forces - (House of Representatives)

- Ground forces
- Air Force
- Navy
- Coast Guard

=== Lithuania ===
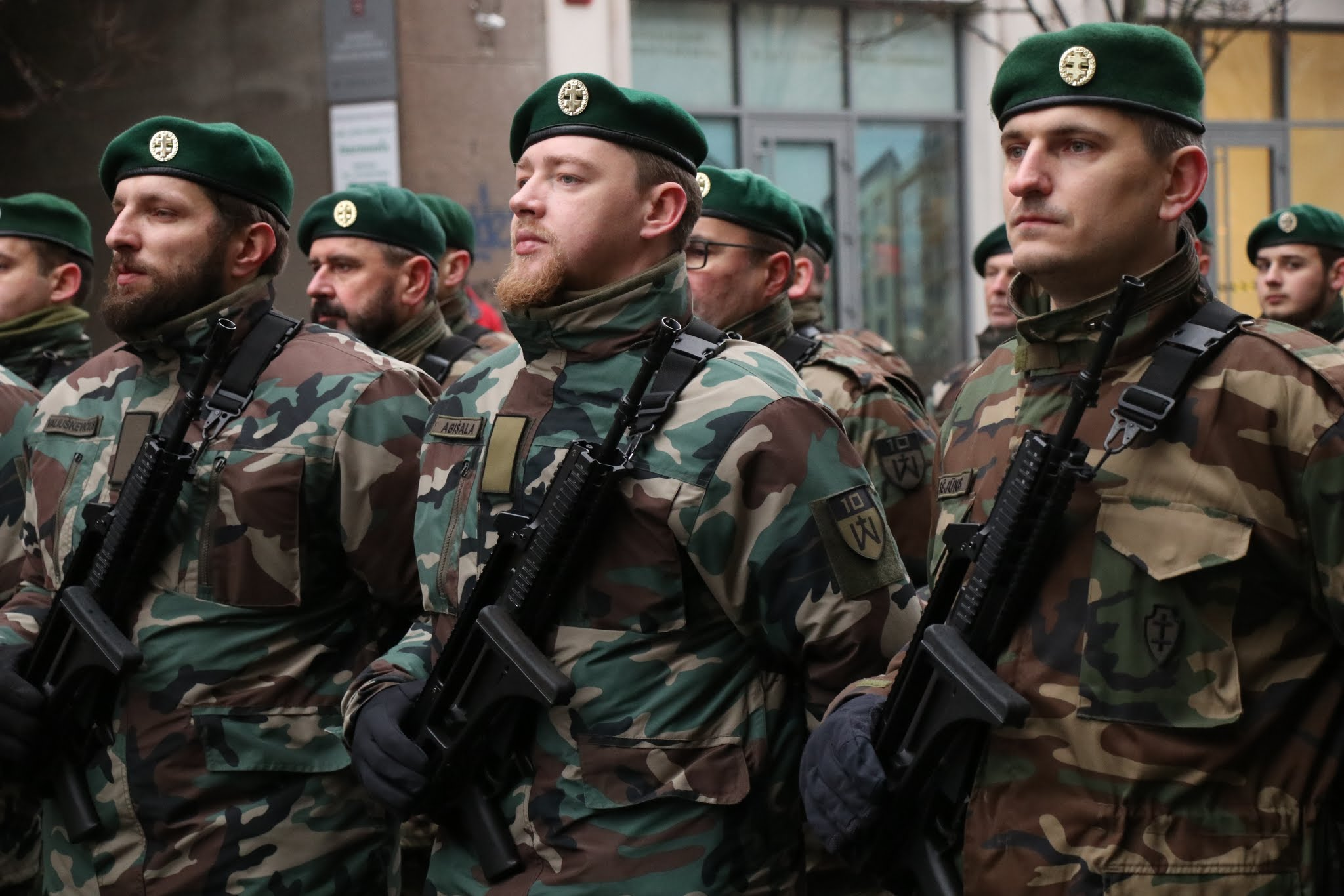
Lithuanian Riflemen's Union Combat Members formation

Lithuanian Armed Forces

- Land Force
- Air Force
- Naval Force
- Special Operations Force
- Volunteer Forces

Riflemen's Union
Public Security Service
State Border Guard Service

=== Luxembourg ===
Luxembourg Armed Forces

== M ==
=== Madagascar ===
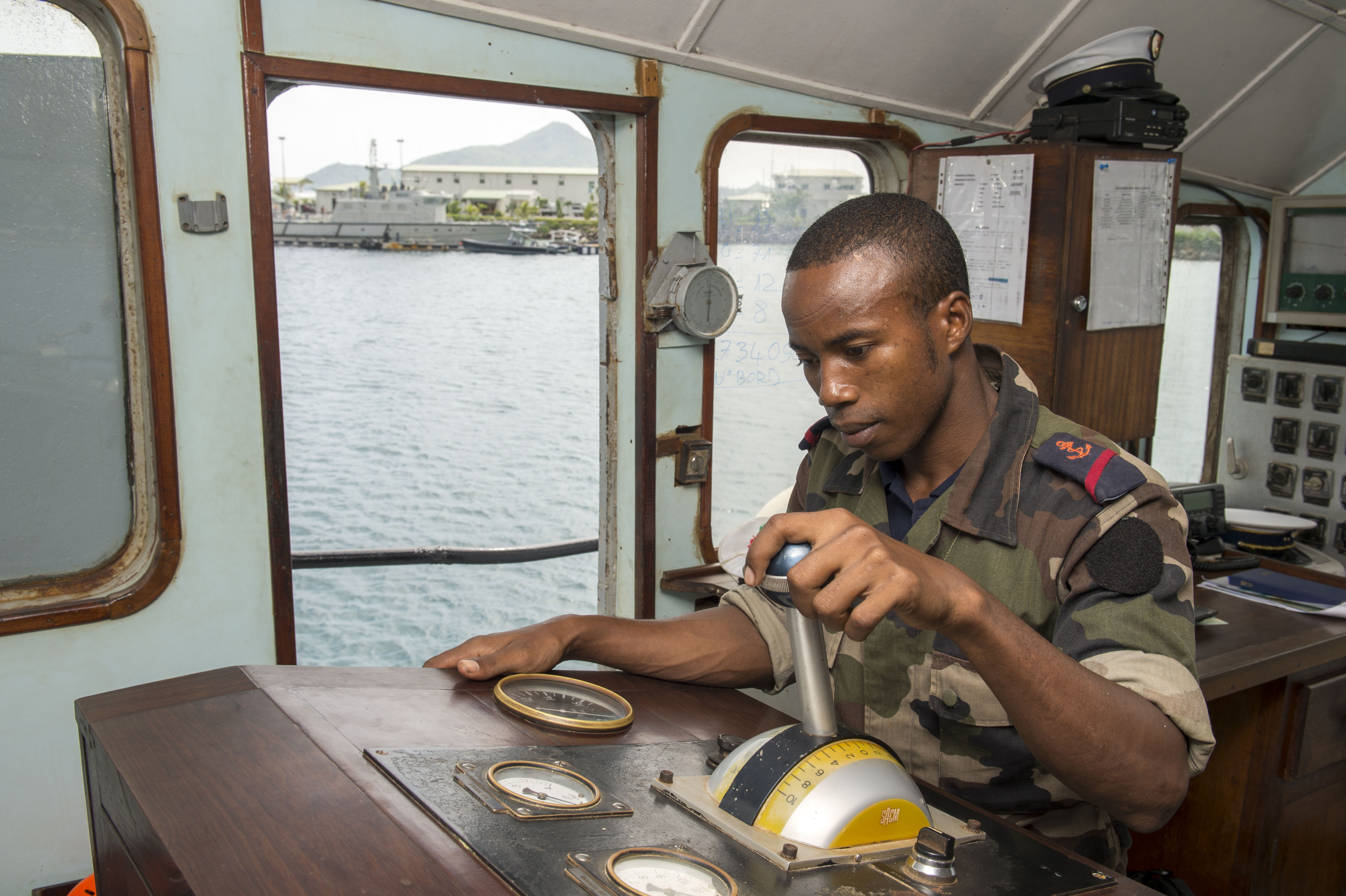
Madagascan sailor on the bridge of the offshore patrol vessel RC Trozona

Madagascar Armed Forces

- Air Force
- Navy
- Army
- National Gendarmerie

=== Malawi ===
Malawian Defence Force

- Army
- Maritime Force
- Air Force

=== Malaysia ===
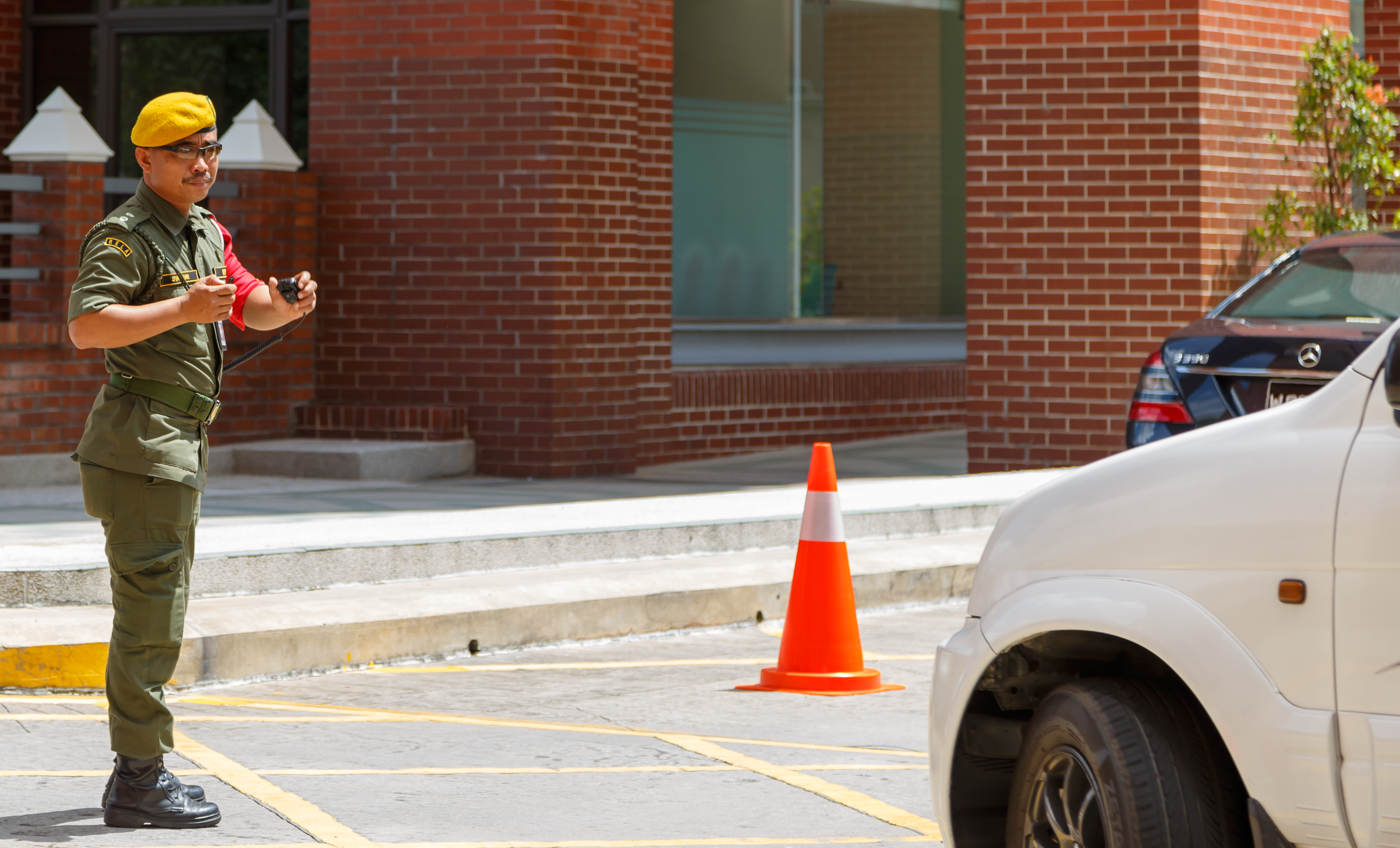
Member of Malaysia Volunteers Corps.

Malaysian Armed Forces

- Army
- Air Force
- Navy

Johor Military Forces
Malaysian Maritime Enforcement Agency
Malaysia Volunteers Corps Department

=== Maldives ===
Maldives National Defence Force

- Coast Guard
- Air Corps
- Marine Corps
- Special Forces

=== Mali ===
Malian Armed Forces

- Army
- Air Force
- National Gendarmerie
- National Guard

=== Malta ===
Armed Forces of Malta

- 1st Regiment
- Air Wing
- Maritime Squadron

=== Mauritania ===
Armed Forces of Mauritania

- Army
- Navy
- Air Force
- National Gendarmerie
- National Guard

=== Mexico ===
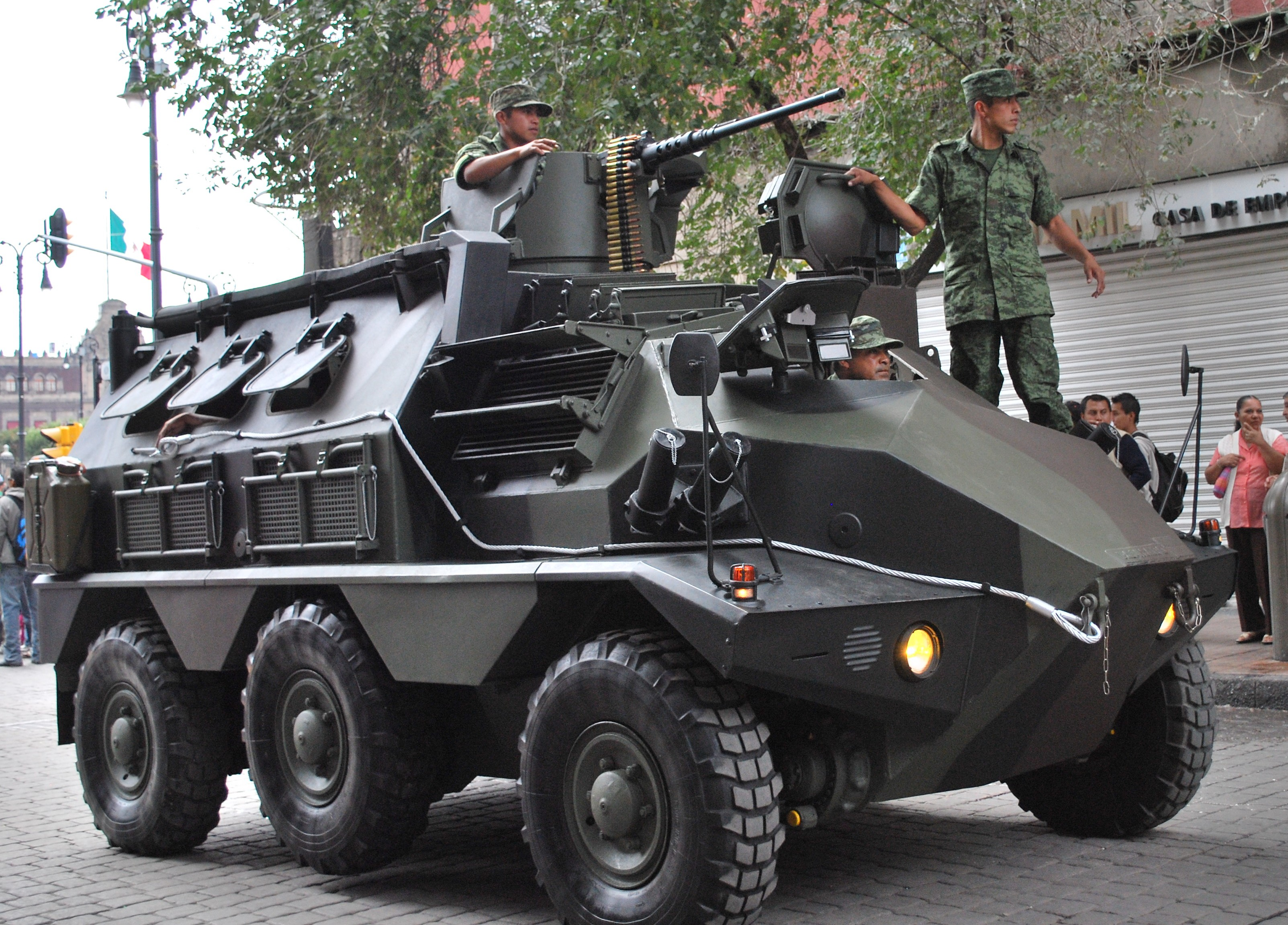
The Mexican Armed Forces, the second-largest military in North America, have been primarily engaged in the Mexican drug war since 2006.

Mexican Armed Forces

- Army
- Air Force
- Navy
- National Guard

=== Moldova ===
Armed Forces of the Republic of Moldova

- National Army
  - Ground Forces
  - Air Force
- Carabinieri

=== Monaco ===
Public Services (Monaco)

- Compagnie des Carabiniers
- Corps des Sapeurs-Pompiers

=== Mongolia ===
Mongolian Armed Forces

- Ground Force
- Air Force
- Construction and Engineering Forces

Border Protection
Internal Troops
Agency of Court Decision

=== Montenegro ===
Armed Forces of Montenegro

- Ground Army
- Navy
- Air Force

=== Morocco ===
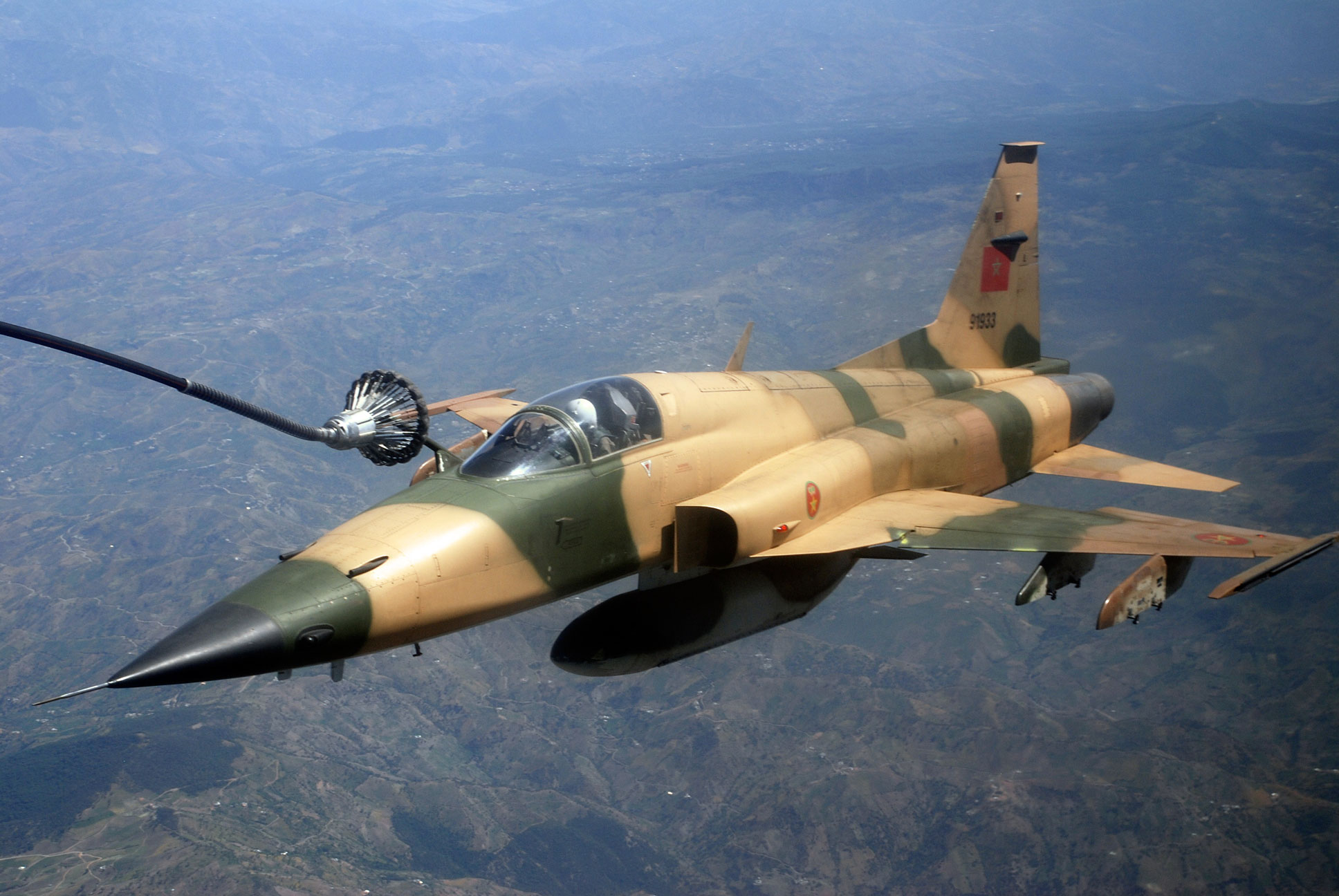
A Moroccan F-5E during mid-air refueling

Royal Moroccan Armed Forces

- Army
- Navy
- Air Force
- Gendarmerie
- Royal Guard

Auxiliary Forces

=== Mozambique ===
Mozambique Defence Armed Forces

- Land Forces
- Naval Command
- Air Force
- Mozambique Militia

=== Myanmar ===
Tatmadaw

- Army
- Air Force
- Navy
- Coast Guard
- Police Force
- Guard Forces
- People's Militia Units

== N ==
=== Namibia ===
Namibian Defence Force

- Army
- Navy
  - Marine Corps
- Air Force

=== Netherlands ===
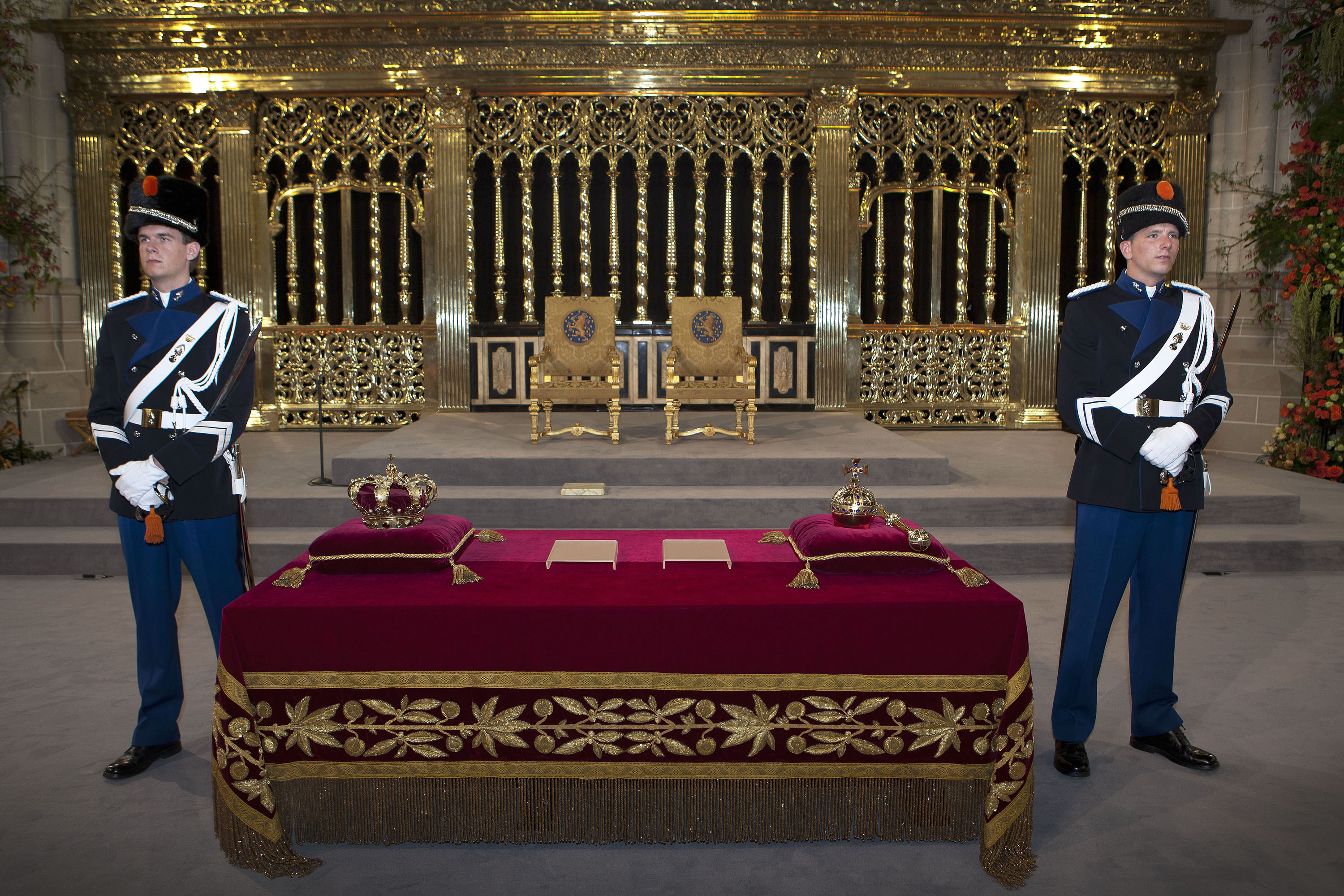
Two marechaussee guards protecting the Dutch Crown Jewels.

Netherlands Armed Forces

- Navy
  - Marine Corps
- Army
- Air and Space Force
- Marechaussee

=== Nepal ===
Nepalese Armed Forces

- Army
- Army Air Service

Armed Police Force

=== New Zealand ===
New Zealand Defence Force

- Army
- Air Force
- Navy

=== Nicaragua ===
Nicaraguan Armed Forces

- Army
- Navy
- Air Force

=== Niger ===
Niger Armed Forces

- Army
- Air Force
- National Gendarmerie
- National Guard

=== Nigeria ===
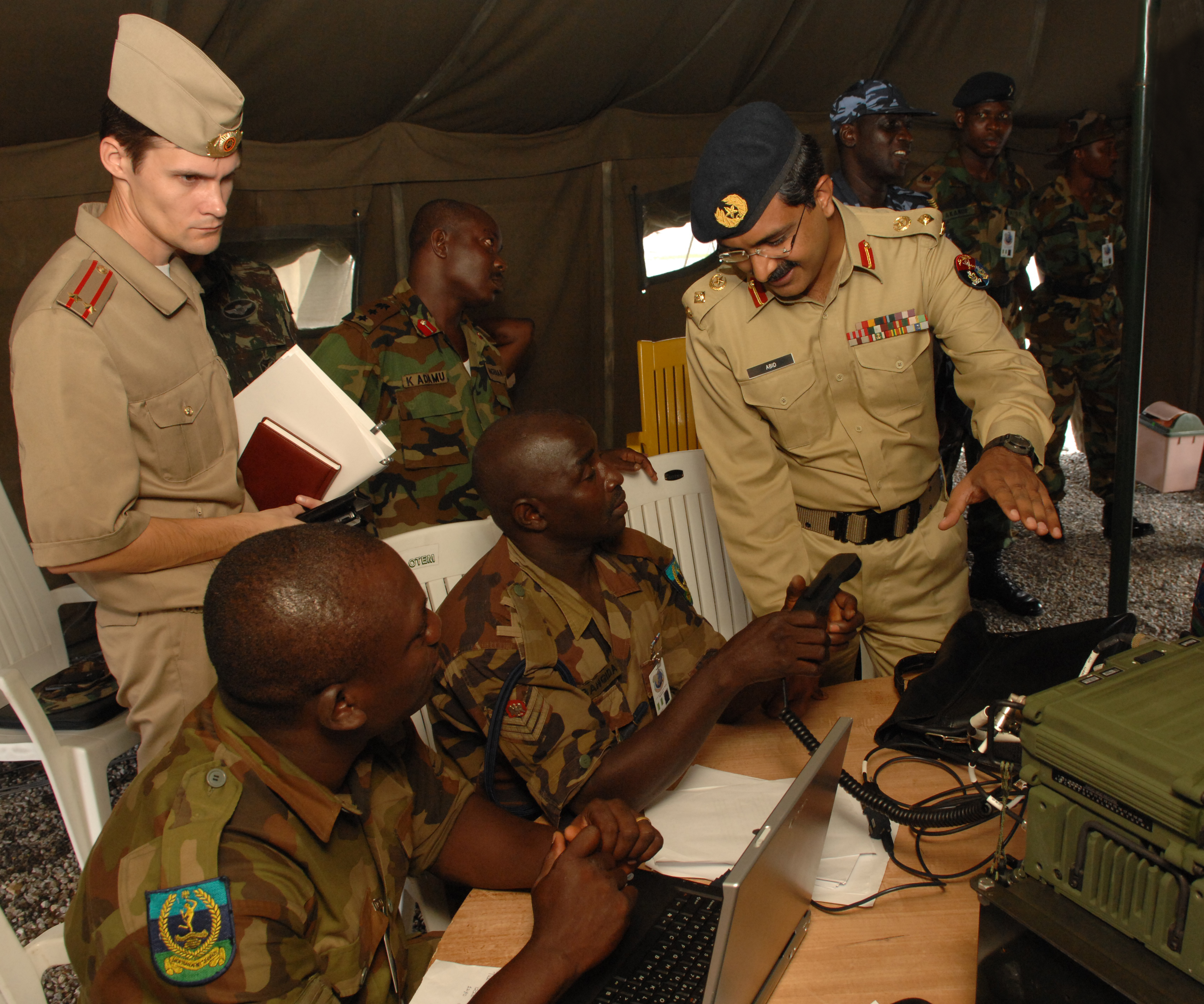
Defence attachés from Russia and Pakistan visit the communications tent at the Nigerian Air Force base during Africa Endeavor 2008

Nigerian Armed Forces

- Army
- Air Force
- Navy

=== North Macedonia ===
Army of the Republic of North Macedonia

- 1st Mechanized Infantry Brigade
- Air Brigade
- Special Operations Regiment

=== Norway ===
Norwegian Armed Forces

- Army
- Air Force
- Navy
- Cyber Defence Force
- Home Guard

== O ==
=== Oman ===
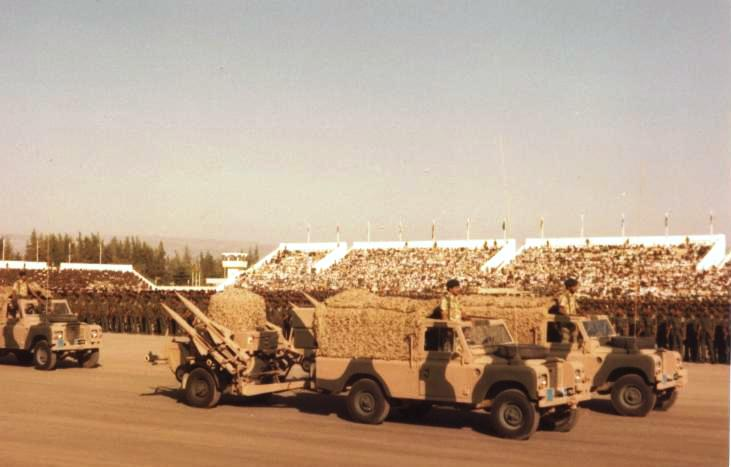
Prior to 2022 Russian invasion of Ukraine and 2023 Israel-Gaza war, Oman spent the highest percentage of GDP of its military of any nation.

Sultan of Oman's Armed Forces

- Royal Air Force of Oman
- Royal Army of Oman
- Royal Navy of Oman
- Royal Guard of Oman
- Sultan's Special Force

== P ==
=== Pakistan ===
Pakistan Armed Forces

- Army
  - National Guard
- Air Force
- Navy

Civil Armed Forces

- Pakistan Rangers
- Frontier Corps
- Federal Constabulary
- Coast Guards
- Gilgit-Baltistan Scouts

Strategic Plans Division Force
Maritime Security Agency

=== Palestine ===
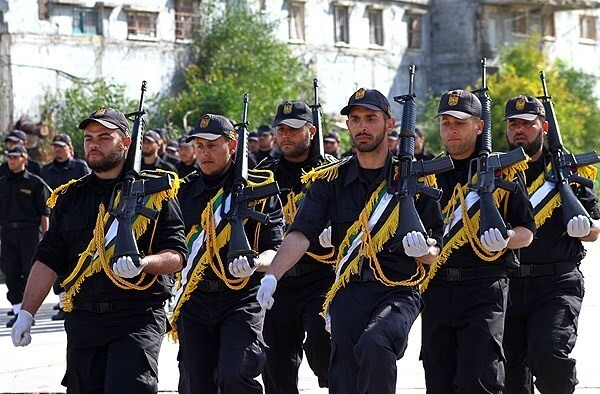
Palestinian National Security Forces exercise in Gaza in 2012.

Palestinian Security Services (West Bank)

- National Security Forces
  - General Security
  - Air Police
  - Naval Police
  - Military Liaison
  - Military Intelligence
- Civil Police Force
- Preventive Security
- Presidential Guard
- General Intelligence

=== Papua New Guinea ===
Papua New Guinea Defence Force

- Land Element
- Air Element
- Maritime Element

=== Paraguay ===
Armed Forces of Paraguay

- Army
- Air Force
- Navy

=== Peru ===
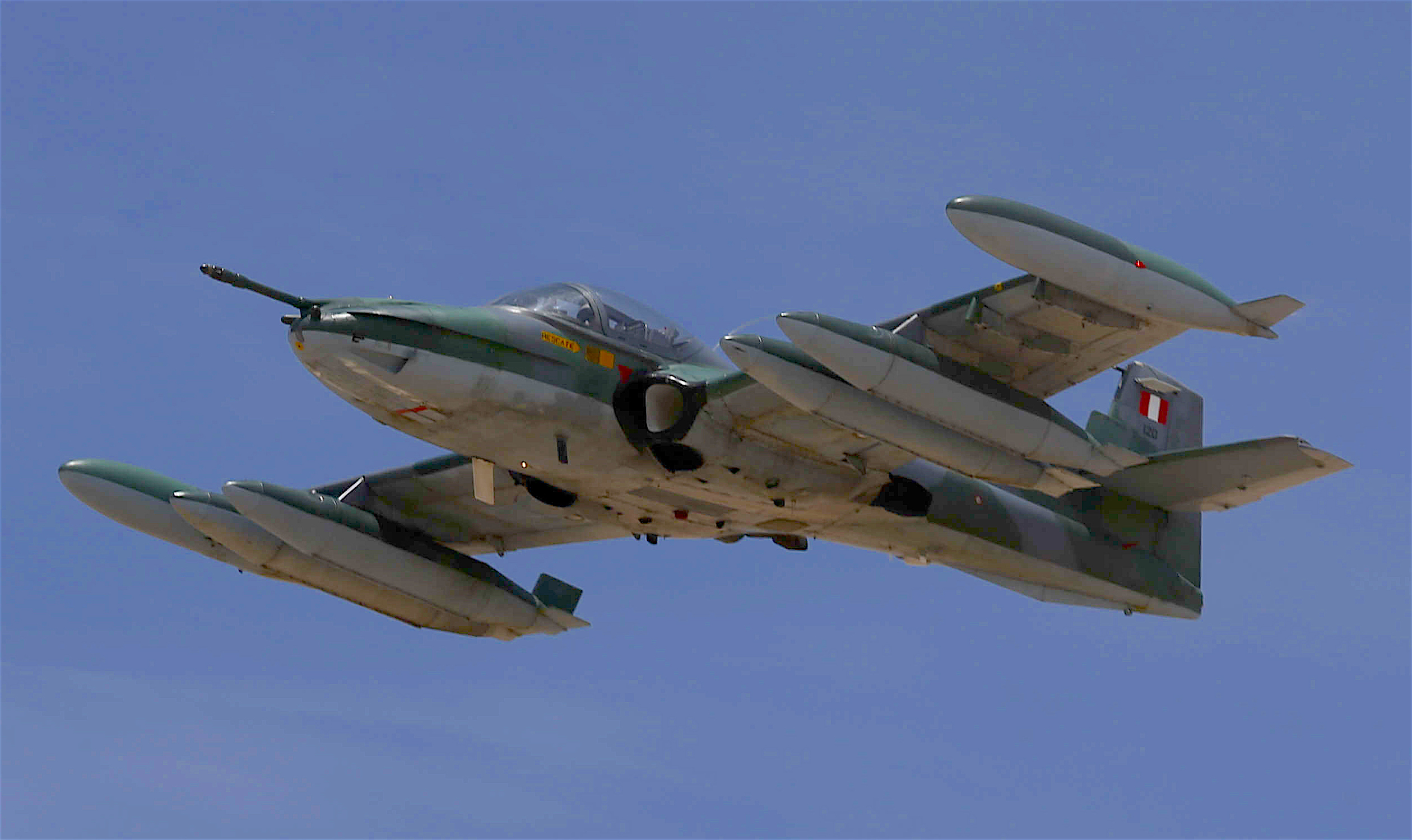
Peruvian Cessna A-37 Dragonfly in 2015

Peruvian Armed Forces

- Joint Command
- Army
- Air Force
- Navy

=== Philippines ===
Armed Forces of the Philippines

- Army
- Air Force
- Navy
  - Marine Corps
- Coast Guard

=== Poland ===
Polish Armed Forces

- Land Forces
- Air Force
- Navy
- Special Forces
- Territorial Defence Force

=== Portugal ===
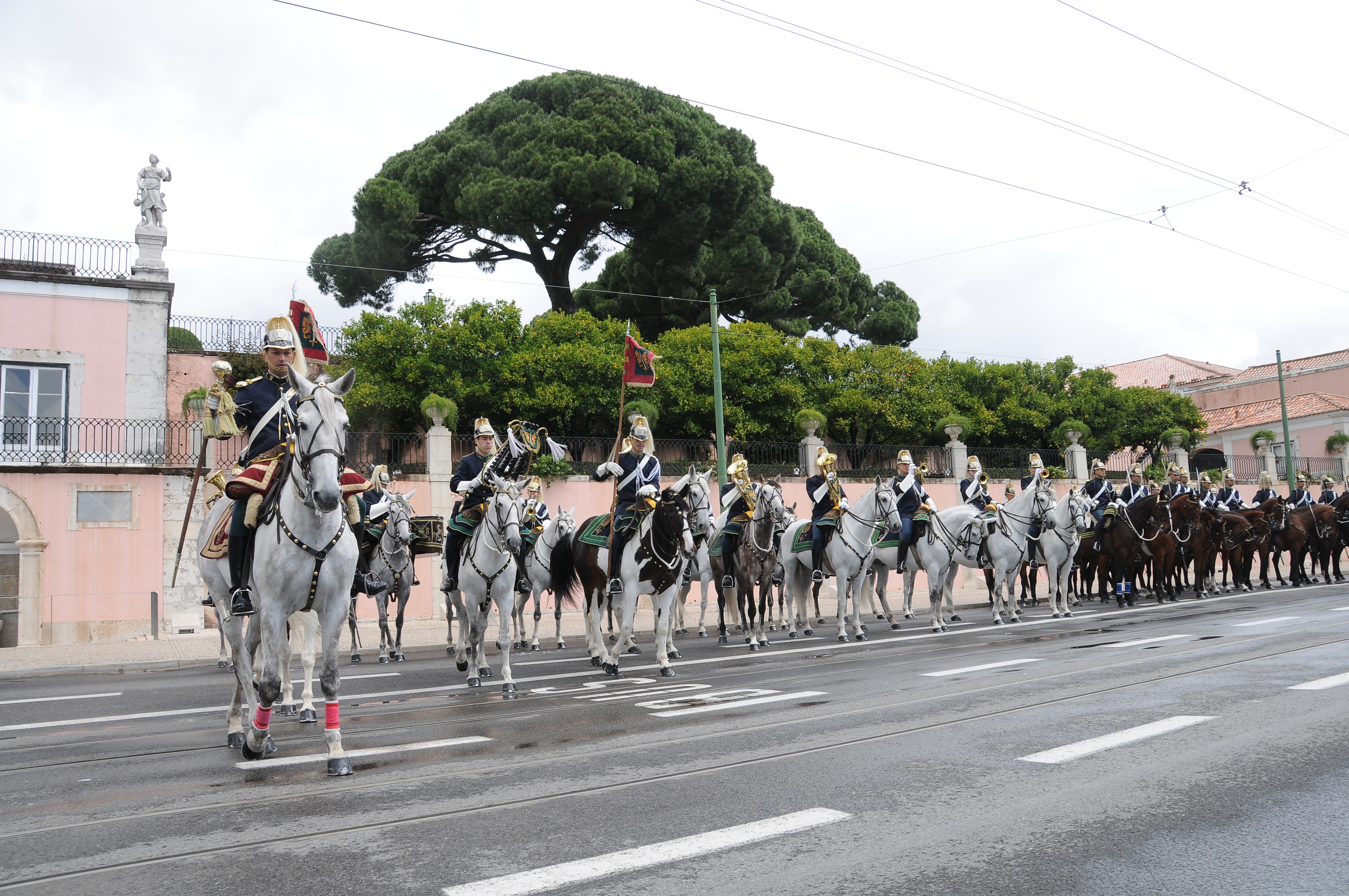
National Republican Guard cavalry at the changing of the guard of the Presidencial Palace of Belém.

Portuguese Armed Forces

- Army
- Navy
- Air Force

National Republican Guard

== Q ==
=== Qatar ===
Qatar Armed Forces

- Emiri Land Force
- Emiri Air Force
- Emiri Navy
- Amiri Guard

== R ==
=== Romania ===
Romanian Armed Forces

- Land Forces
- Air Force
- Naval Forces

Gendarmerie
General Inspectorate for Emergency Situations

- Military Firefighters Corps

=== Russia ===
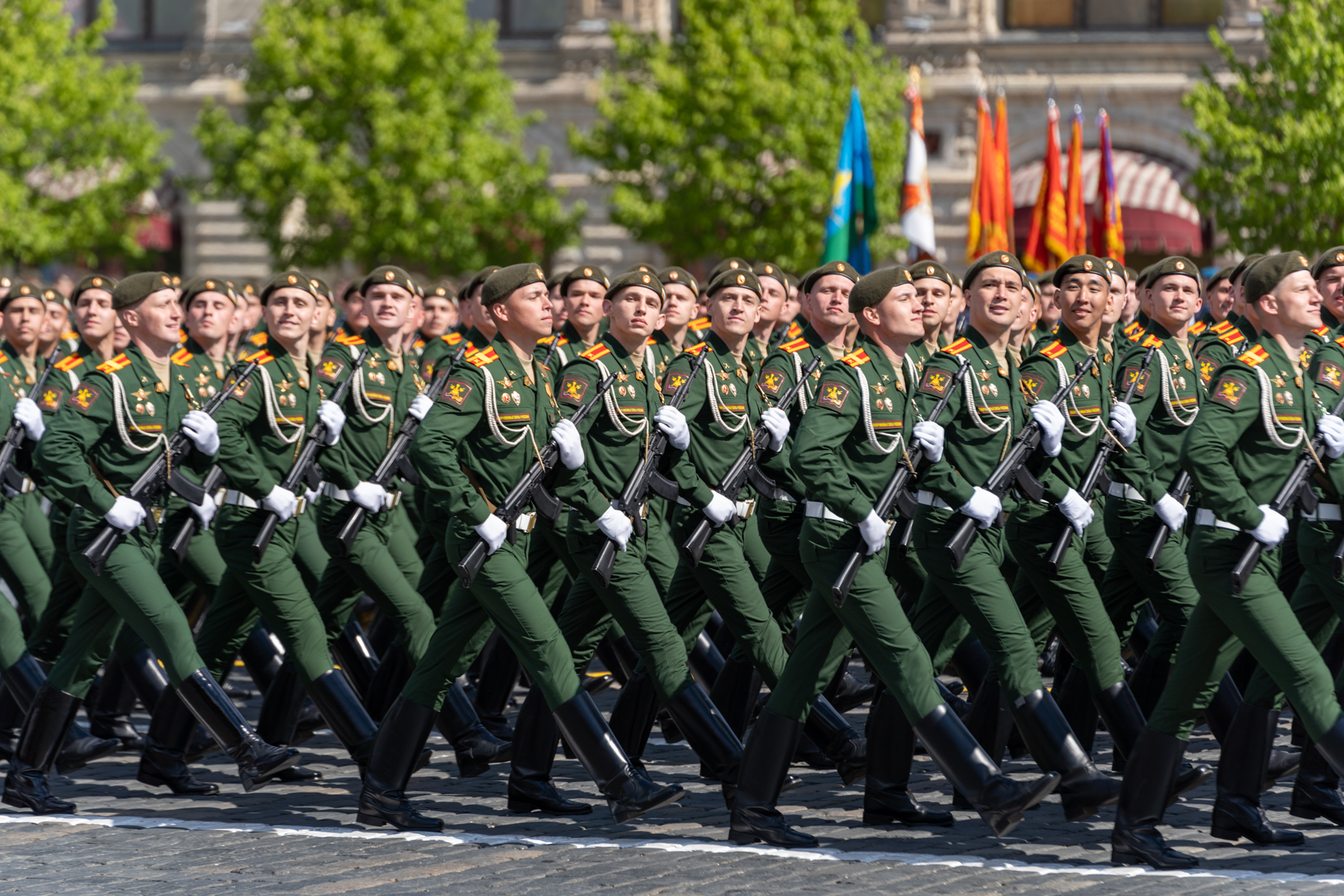
The Russian Armed Forces are among the largest and most well-funded militaries in the world.

Armed Forces of the Russian Federation

- Ground Forces
- Navy
- Aerospace Forces
  - Air Force
  - Space Forces
- Strategic Rocket Forces
- Airborne Forces
- Unmanned Systems Forces
- Special Operations Forces
- Logistical Support
  - Road Troops
  - Railway Troops
- Territorial defense

National Guard of Russia

- Special Purpose Mobile Unit
- Special Rapid Response Unit

Registered Cossacks of the Russian Federation

=== Rwanda ===
Rwandan Defence Forces

- Land Forces
  - Marine Unit
- Air Force
- Reserve Force

== S ==
=== Saint Kitts and Nevis ===
Saint Kitts and Nevis Defence Force

- Regiment
- Coast Guard

=== San Marino ===
Sammarinese Armed Forces

- Guard of the Great and General Council
- Uniformed company of the militias
- Guard of the Rock
  - Guard of the Rock Uniformed Core
  - Guard of the Rock Company of Artillery
- Corps of Gendarmerie

=== Sao Tome and Principe ===
Armed Forces of São Tomé and Príncipe

- Army
  - National Guard
  - Presidential Guard
- Coast Guard
  - Marine Corps

=== Saudi Arabia ===
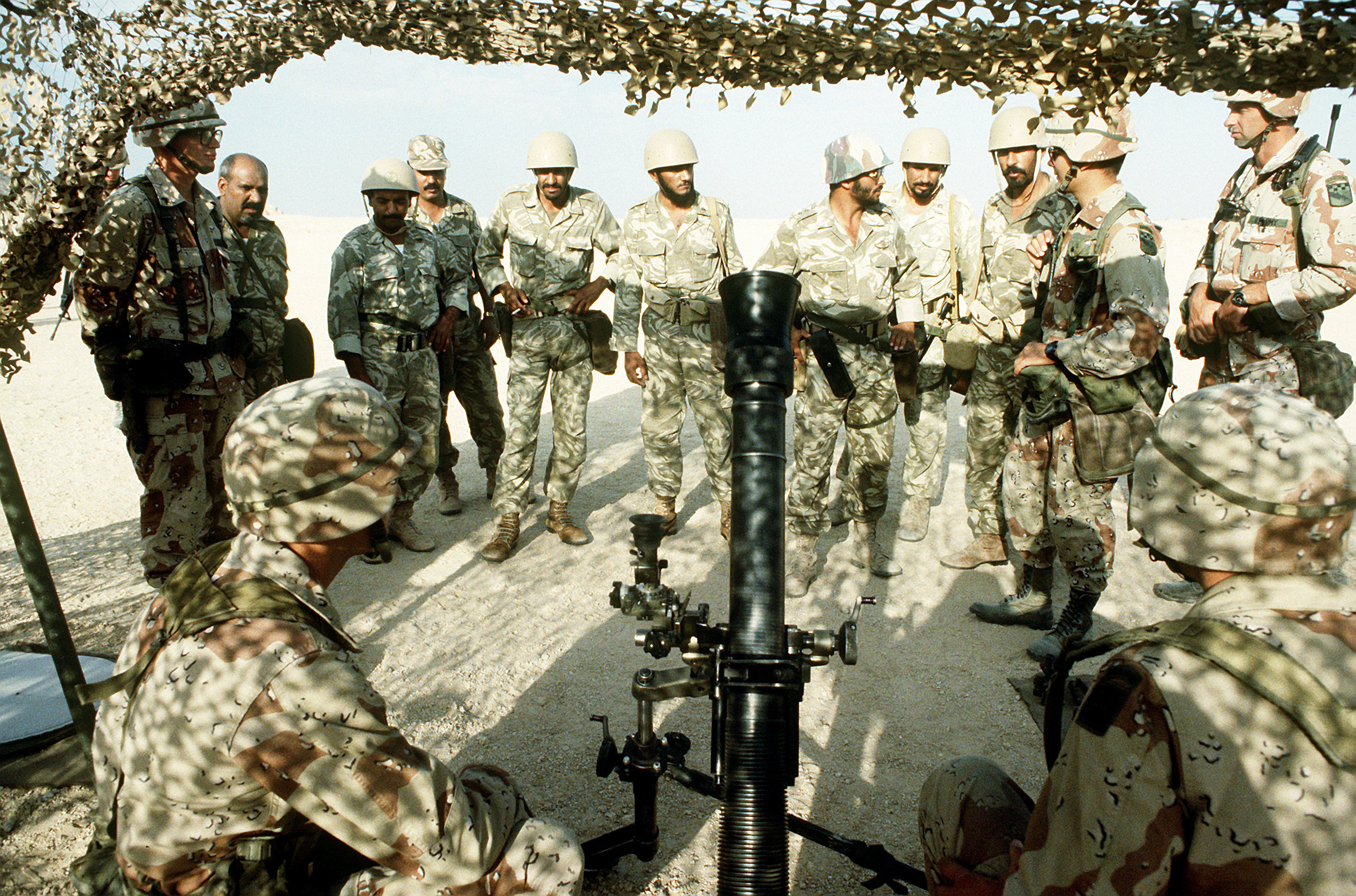
Saudi Arabia has among the largest military budgets in the world. In this picture, Saudi Arabian soldiers receive mortar training from American soldiers.

Royal Saudi Arabian Military Forces

- Saudi Arabian Armed Forces
  - Land Forces
  - Air Force
  - Naval Forces
  - Air Defense Forces
  - Strategic Missile Force
- National Guard
- Royal Guard
- Border Guards
- Emergency Force
- Special Security Forces
- Special Security Unit

=== Senegal ===
Armed Forces of Senegal

- Army
- Navy
- Air Force
- National Gendarmerie

=== Serbia ===
Serbian Armed Forces

- Army
- Air Force and Air Defence

=== Seychelles ===
Seychelles People's Defence Force

- Land Force Command
- Coast Guard
- Air Force

=== Sierra Leone ===
Republic of Sierra Leone Armed Forces

- Army
- Navy
- Air Force

=== Singapore ===
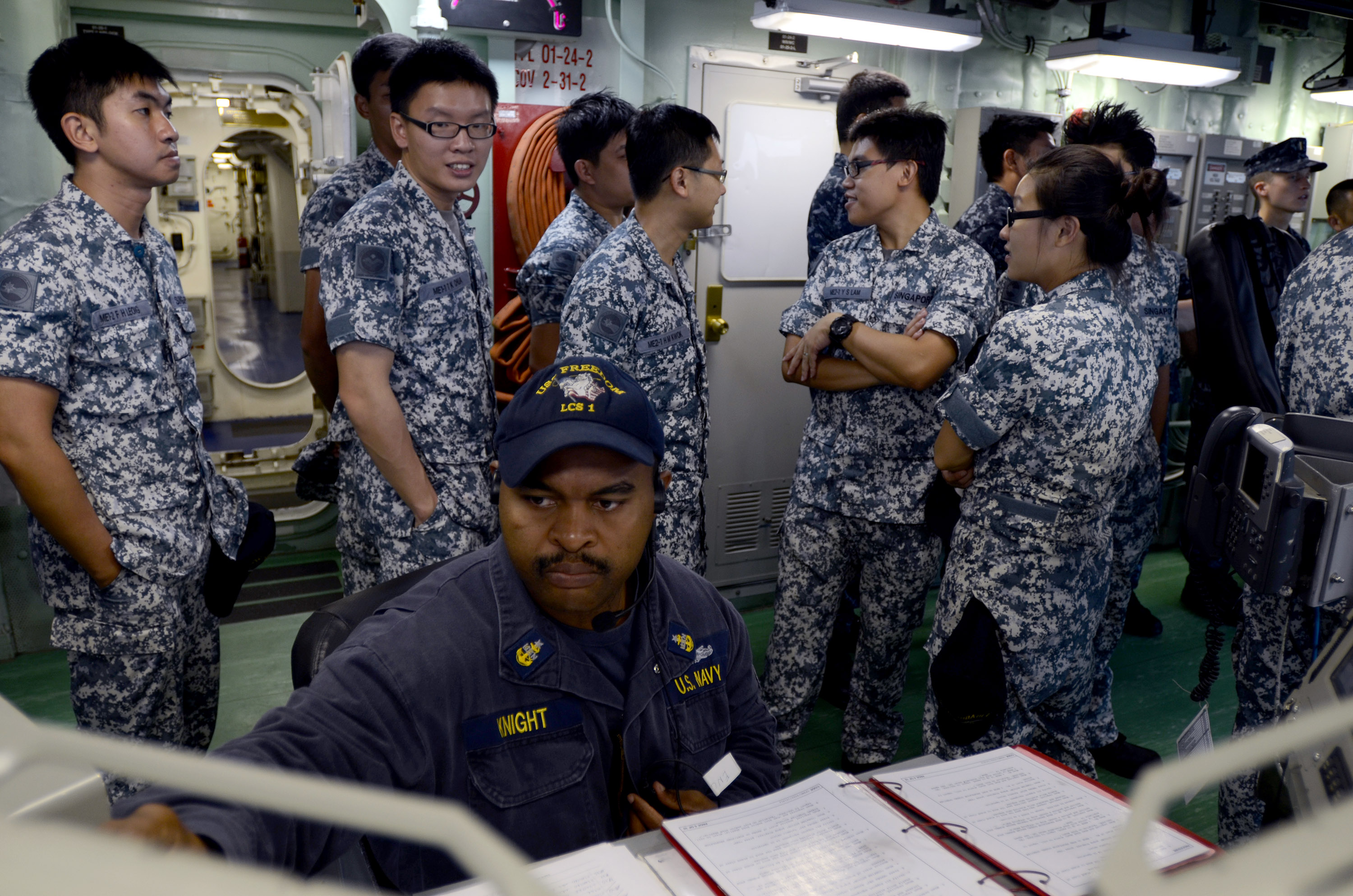
Singaporean sailors tour the USS Freedom.

Singapore Armed Forces

- Army
- Navy
- Air Force
- Digital and Intelligence Service
- Volunteer Corps

=== Slovakia ===
Slovak Armed Forces

- Ground Forces
- Air Force

=== Slovenia ===
Slovenian Armed Forces

- Ground Force
- Air Force and Air Defence
- Navy

=== Somalia ===
Somali Armed Forces

- National Army
- Navy
- Air Force

=== South Africa ===
South African National Defence Force

- Army
- Air Force
- Navy
- Military Health Service

=== South Sudan ===
South Sudan People's Defense Forces

- Ground Force
- Air Force and Air-Defense
- Riverine Unit

=== Spain ===
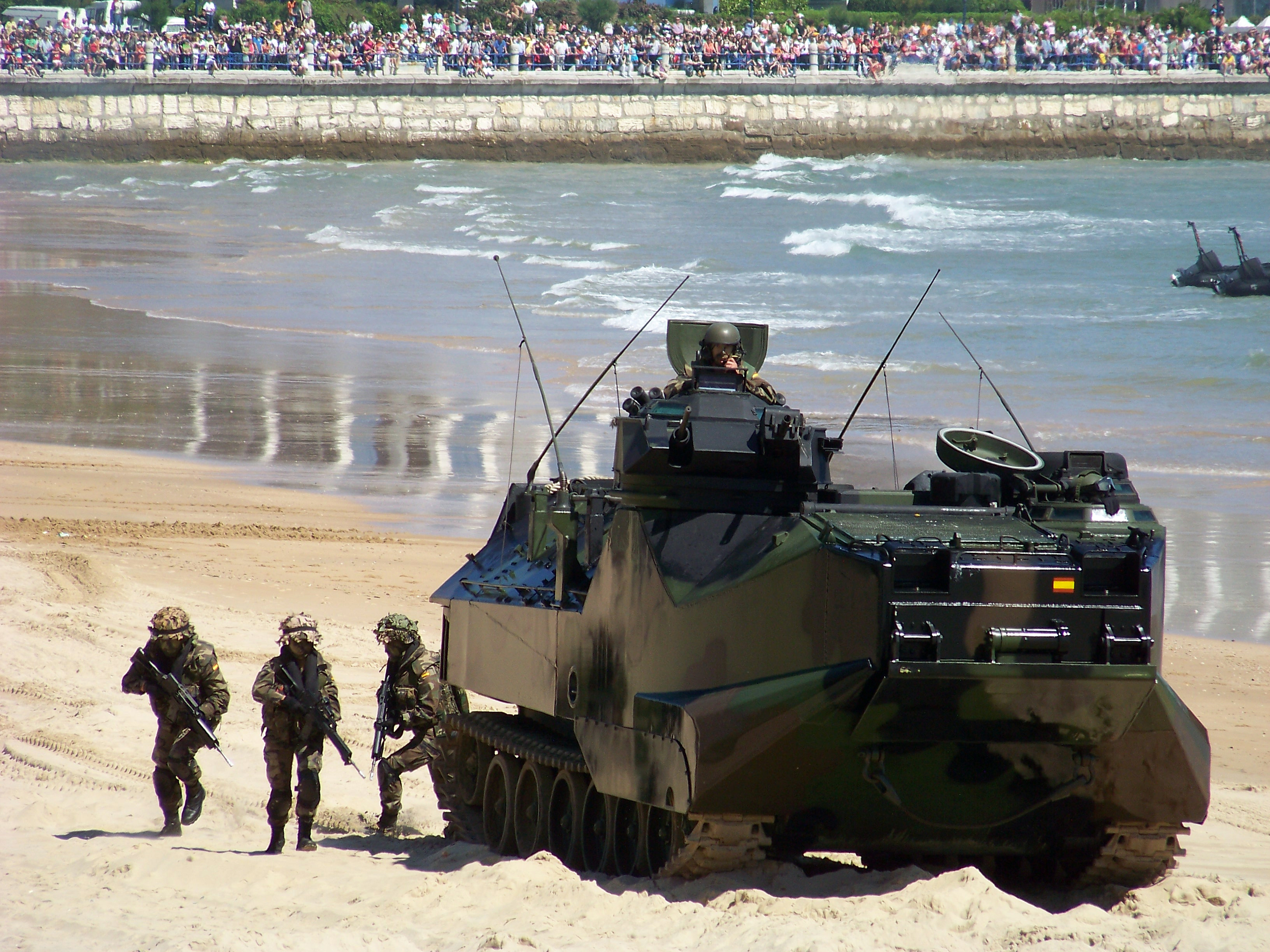
The Spanish Armed Forces contain the oldest military units in the world, including a regiment of the Spanish Army operating continuously since 1248.

Spanish Armed Forces

- Army
- Air and Space Force
- Navy
  - Marine Infantry
- Royal Guard
- Military Emergencies Unit
- Common Corps

Civil Guard

=== Sri Lanka ===
Sri Lanka Armed Forces

- Army
- Navy
- Air Force
- Coast Guard
- Civil Security Force

=== Sudan ===
Sudanese Armed Forces

- Army
- Navy
- Air Force
- Republican Guard

=== Suriname ===
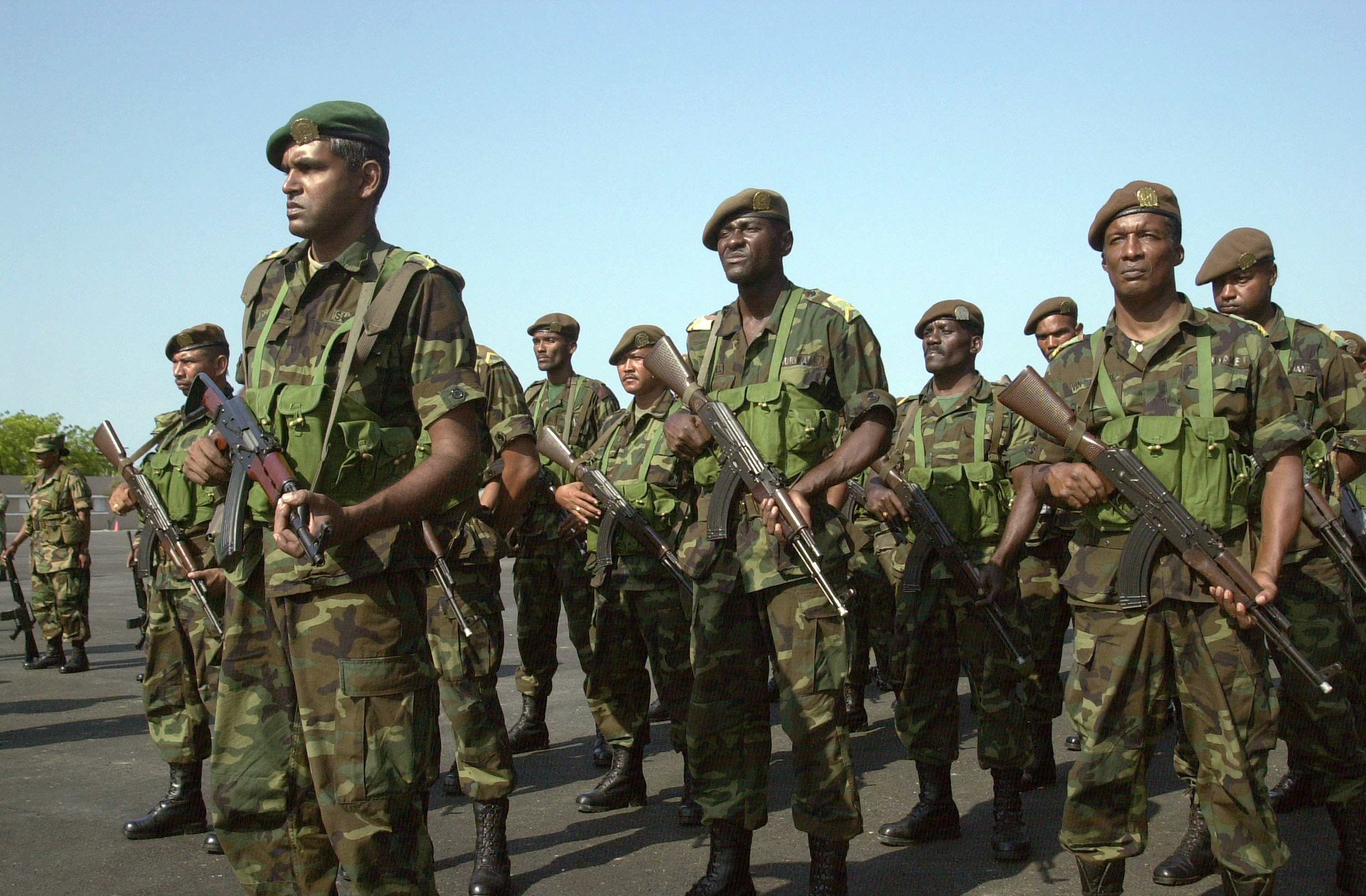
Surinamese soldiers at the Tradewinds 04 Multinational Training Exercise in the Dominican Republic 2004.

Suriname National Army

- Land Forces
- Air Force
- Coast Guard

=== Swaziland ===
Umbutfo Eswatini Defence Force

- Army
- Air Force

=== Sweden ===
Swedish Armed Forces

- Army
- Air Force
- Navy
- Home Guard

=== Switzerland ===
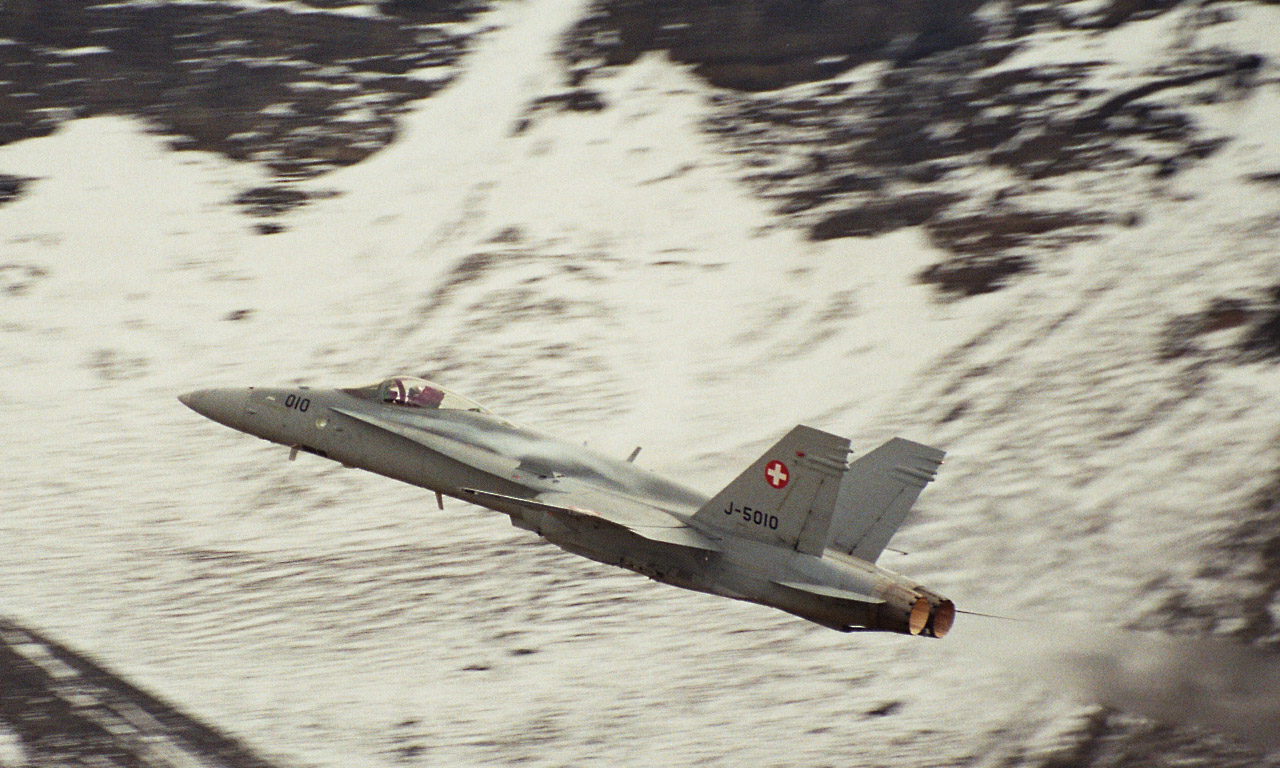
Because of Switzerland's long history of neutrality, the Swiss Armed Forces have not been involved in foreign wars since the early 19th century, but do participate in international peacekeeping missions.

Swiss Armed Forces

- Land Forces
- Air Force

=== Syria ===
Syrian Armed Forces

- Army
- Air Force
- Navy

== T ==
=== Tajikistan ===
Armed Forces of the Republic of Tajikistan

- Ground Forces
- Mobile Forces
- National Guard
- Air Force
- Border Troops
- Internal Troops

=== Tanzania ===
Tanzania People's Defence Force

- Army
- Air Force Command
- Naval Command

=== Thailand ===
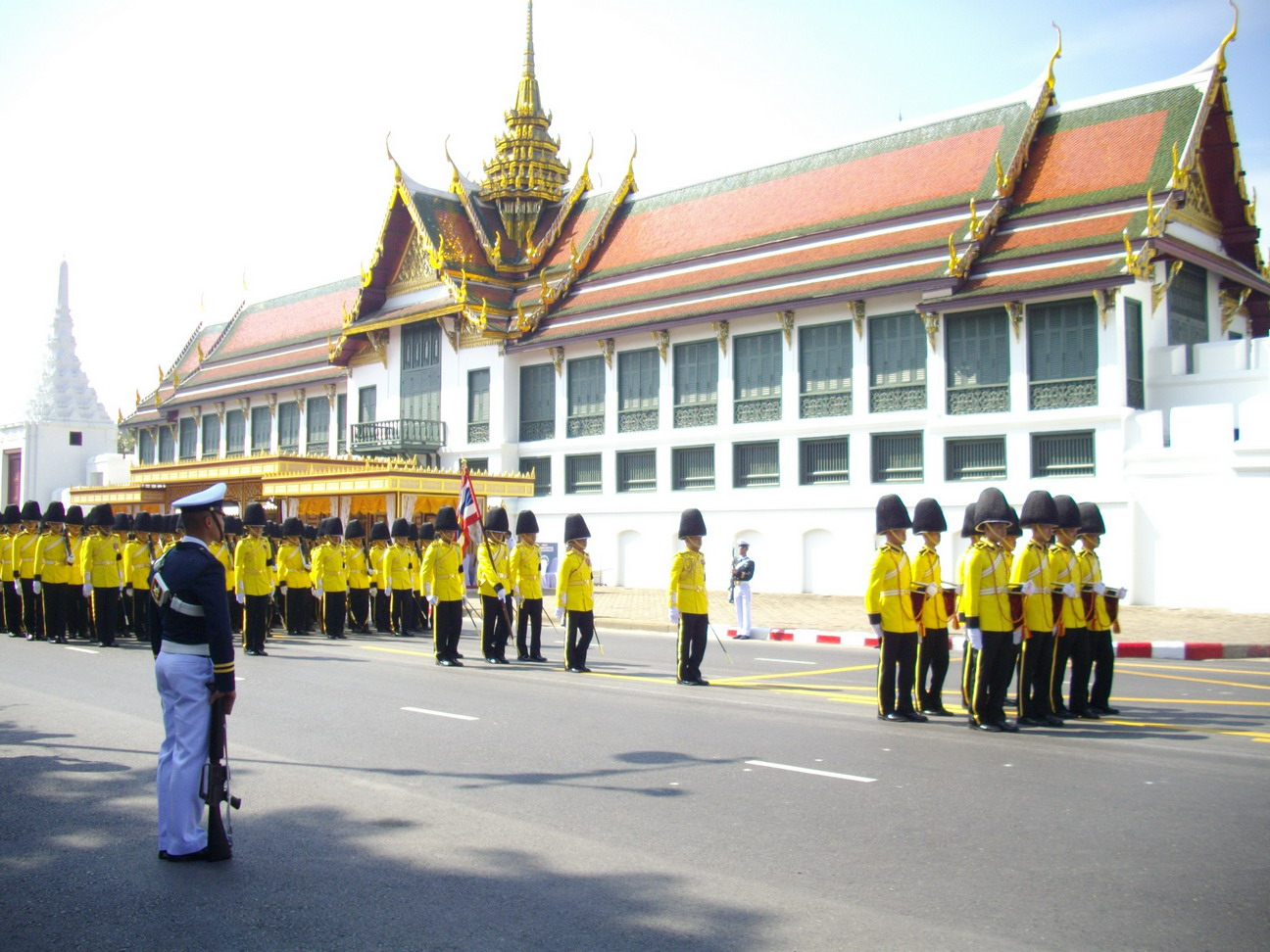
The 1st Marine Battalion, King's Guard from the Royal Thai Marine Corps, in the procession of princess Galyani Vadhana's urn.

Royal Thai Armed Forces

- Army
- Air Force
- Navy
  - Marine Corps
- Thahan Phran

Volunteer Defense Corps

=== Togo ===
Togolese Armed Forces

- Army
- Air Force
- Navy
- National Gendarmerie

=== Tonga ===
His Majesty's Armed Forces (Tonga)

- Land Force
- Maritime Force
- Air Wing

=== Trinidad and Tobago ===
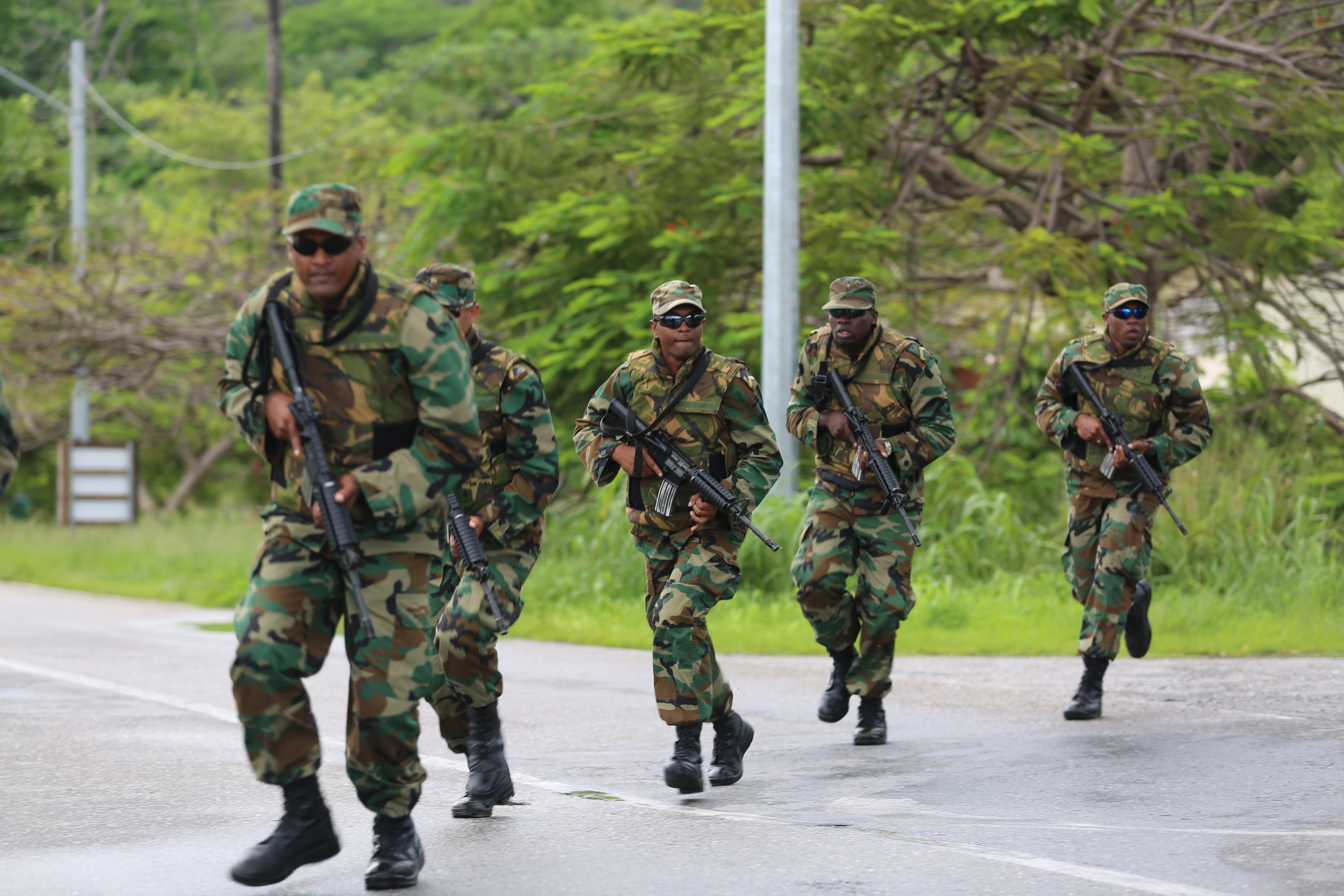
Soldiers of the Trinidad and Tobago Regiment during exercise Tradewinds 17.

Trinidad and Tobago Defence Force

- Regiment
- Coast Guard
- Air Guard
- Defence Force Reserves

=== Tunisia ===
Tunisian Armed Forces

- Army
- Air Force
- Navy

National Guard

=== Turkey ===
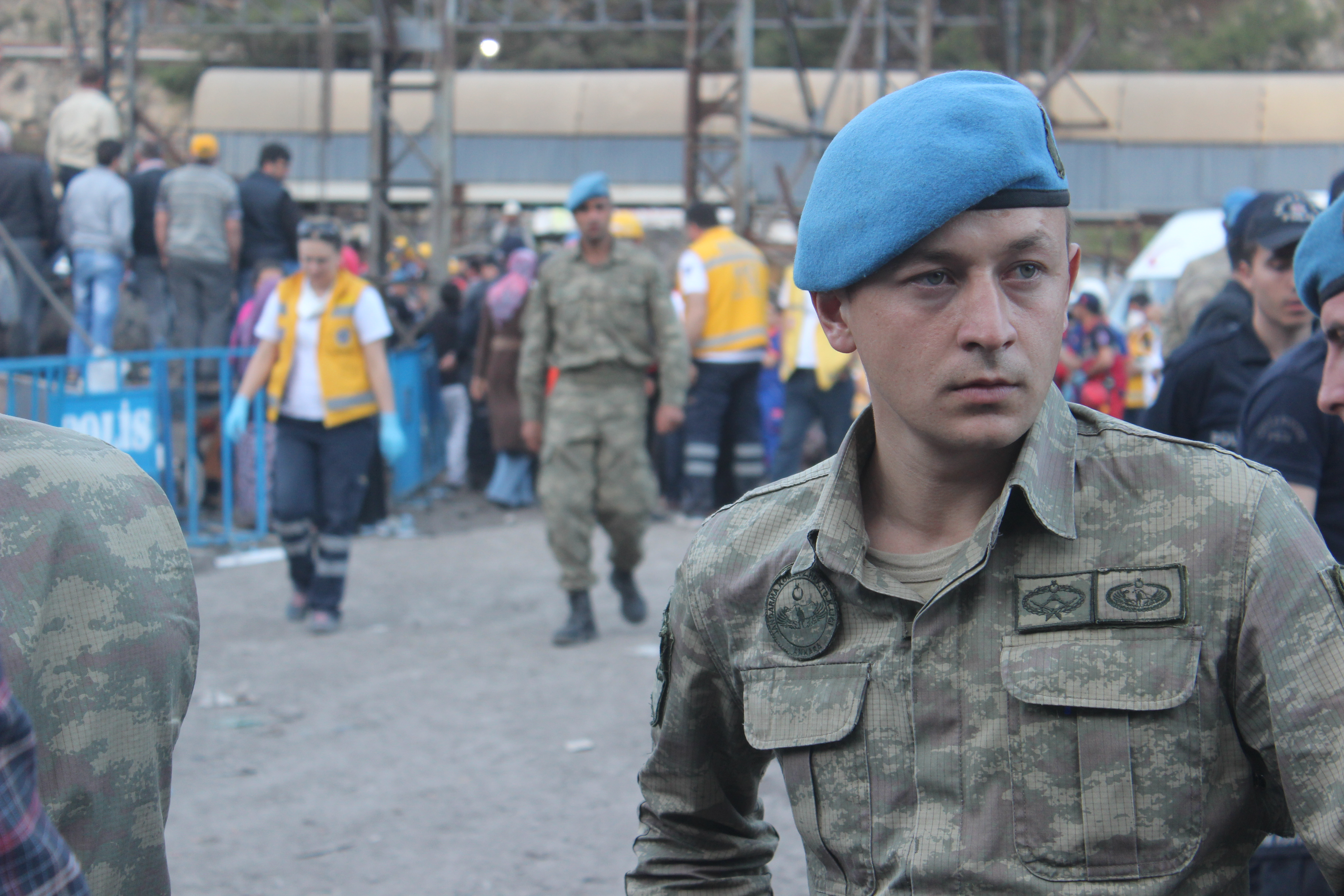
Turkish Gendarmerie personnel during the Soma mine disaster in 2014.

Turkish Armed Forces

- Land Forces
- Air Force
- Naval Forces

Gendarmerie
Coast Guard

=== Turkmenistan ===
Armed Forces of Turkmenistan

- Air Force
- Ground Forces
- Naval Forces
- State Border Service
- Internal Troops
- National Guard

== U ==
=== Uganda ===
Uganda People's Defence Force

- Land Force
- Air Force
- Special Forces Command
- Reserve Forces

=== Ukraine ===
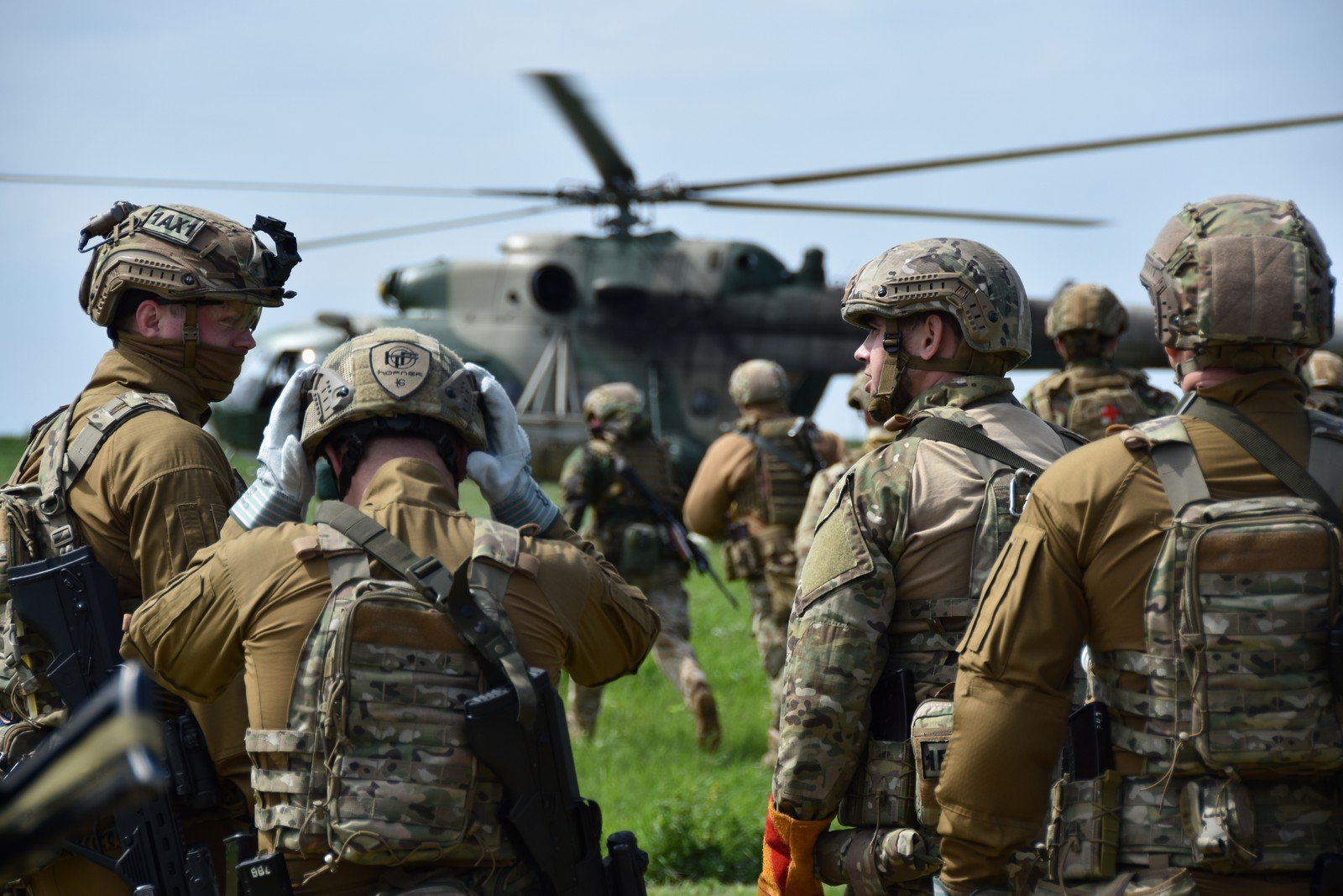
Ukraine spends a higher percentage of its GDP on military funding than any other nation.

Armed Forces of Ukraine

- Ground Forces
- Air Force
- Navy
- Marine Corps
- Air Assault Forces
- Special Forces
- Territorial Defense Forces
- Unmanned Systems Forces
- Medical Forces
- Support Forces
- Logistics Forces
- Communications and Cybersecurity Troops
- Assault Forces

=== United Arab Emirates ===
United Arab Emirates Armed Forces

- Army
- Navy
- Air Force
- Presidential Guard
- National Guard

=== United Kingdom ===
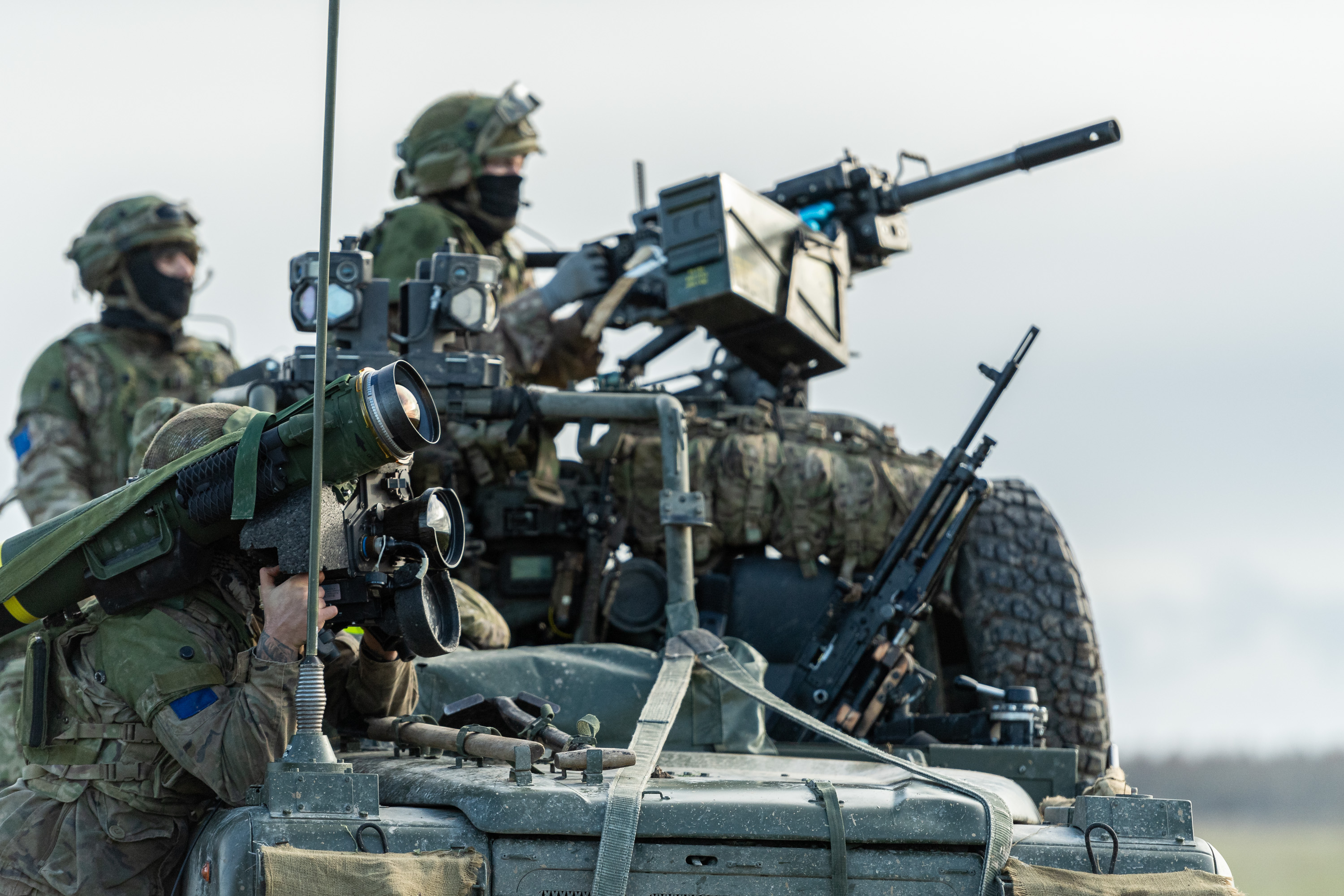
The United Kingdom operates bases in an estimated 15-20 foreign nations, the second most of any military after only the United States.

British Armed Forces

- Army
- Air Force
- Navy
- Marines

=== United States ===
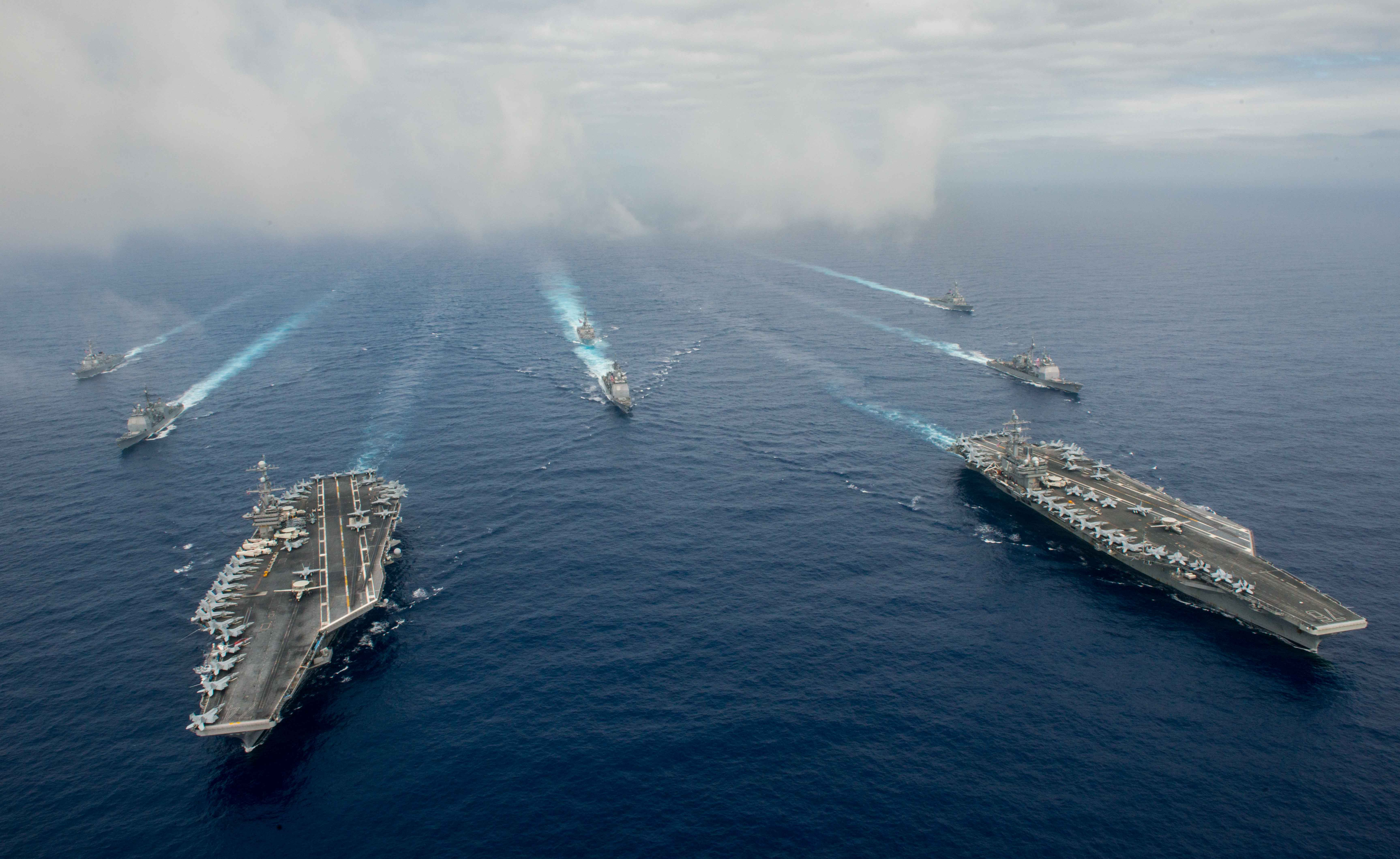
The United States Military is generally the most powerful military in the world.

United States Armed Forces

- Army
- Marine Corps
- Navy
- Air Force
- Space Force
- Coast Guard
- National Guard Bureau

State defense forces

=== Uruguay ===
Armed Forces of Uruguay

- National Army
- National Navy
- Air Force

=== Uzbekistan ===
Armed Forces of the Republic of Uzbekistan

- Ground Forces
- Air and Air Defence Forces
- National Guard
- Border Troops
  - River Force

== V ==
=== Vatican City ===
Military of the Vatican City

- Corps of Gendarmerie
- Pontifical Swiss Guard

=== Venezuela ===
Bolivarian National Armed Forces

- Strategic Command Operations
- Bolivarian Army
- Bolivarian Military Aviation
- Bolivarian Navy
- Bolivarian National Guard
- Bolivarian Militia

=== Vietnam ===
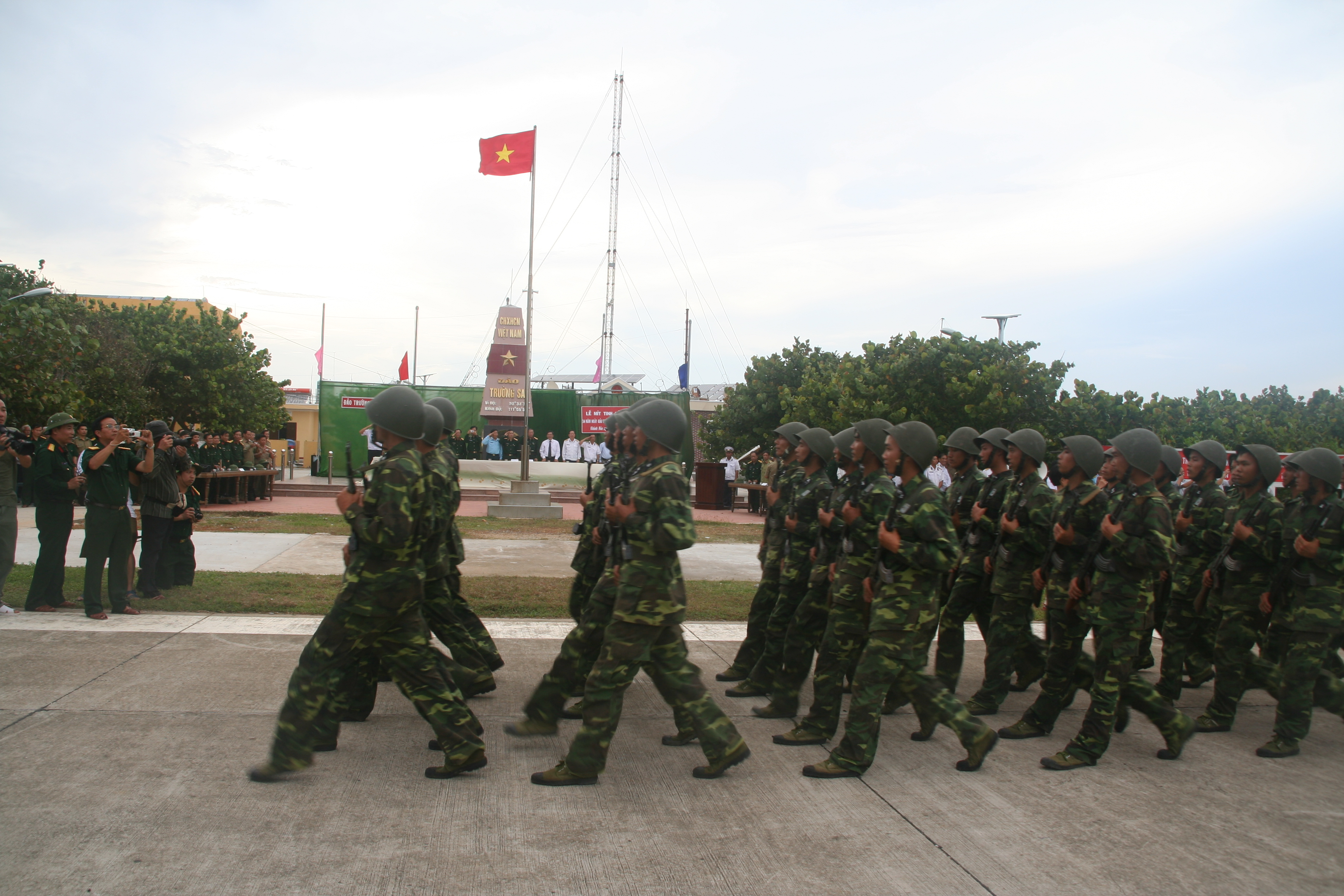
Vietnam Naval Infantry in Spratly Islands in 2009

Vietnam People's Armed Forces

- People's Army of Vietnam
  - Ground Force
  - Navy
  - Air Defence - Air Force
  - Border Guard
  - Coast Guard
  - Artillery - Missile Command
  - Cyberspace Operations Command
  - Ho Chi Minh Mausoleum Protection Command
- People's Public Security
- Militia and Self-Defence Force

== Y ==
=== Yemen ===
Yemeni Armed Forces (PLC)

- National Army
- Air Force
- Navy
- Border Guard Forces
- Strategic Reserve Forces

Yemeni Armed Forces (SPC)

- Army
- Air Force
- Navy
- Unmanned Aviation Forces

== Z ==
=== Zambia ===
Zambian Defence Force

- Army
- Air Force
- National Service

=== Zimbabwe ===
Zimbabwe Defence Forces

- National Army
- Air Force

== List of militaries of disputed countries ==
=== Abkhazia ===
Abkhazian Armed Forces

- Army
- Air Force
- Navy

=== Kosovo ===
Kosovo Security Force

- Land Force Command
- National Guard Command
- Logistics Command
- Training and Doctrine Command

=== Northern Cyprus ===
Security Forces Command

- Combatant command
- Aviation
- Coast Guard
- Police

=== Syria ===
Paramilitary Forces

- Khabur Guards

=== Sahrawi Arab Democratic Republic ===
Sahrawi People's Liberation Army

=== Somaliland ===
Somaliland Armed Forces

- Army
- Coast Guard
- Police Force
- Immigration and Border Control
- Custodial Corps

=== South Ossetia ===
Armed Forces of South Ossetia

=== Taiwan (Republic of China) ===
Republic of China Armed Forces

- Army
- Air Force
- Navy
  - Marine Corps
- Military Police
- Armed Forces Reserve

=== Transnistria ===
Armed Forces of Transnistria

== See also ==
- List of countries by number of military and paramilitary personnel
- List of countries without armed forces
- List of militaries that recruit foreigners
- List of armies by country
- List of navies
- List of air forces
- List of gendarmeries
- List of space forces, units, and formations
- List of military special forces units
- List of active rebel groups
- List of ongoing armed conflicts
- Military branch
