= TRNC Coast Guard Command =

Coast guard of Northern Cyprus

- KKTC Sahil Güvenlik Komutanlığı
- Motto: You are a sailor, you are a soldier, you wait for the Turkish homeland
- Founded: 1978
- Service branches: Coast Guard
- Headquarters: Kyrenia, Northern Cyprus
- Website: https://mucahit.gov.ct.tr/GenelBilgiler/SahilGuvenlik

Personnel
- Active personnel: 238 Staff manning 36 Coast Guard Boats

Industry
- Foreign suppliers: Turkey

Related articles
- History: Turkish Resistance Organisation (TMT)

The TRNC Coast Guard Command (Turkish: KKTC Sahil Güvenlik Komutanlığı) is responsible for defending the Turkish Republic of Northern Cyprus against any attack from the sea. This force was established in 1976. It is affiliated with the Security Forces Command. It is an armed law enforcement agency serving in the coastal areas of the Turkish Republic of Northern Cyprus. It is the only element of the Security Forces Command at sea.

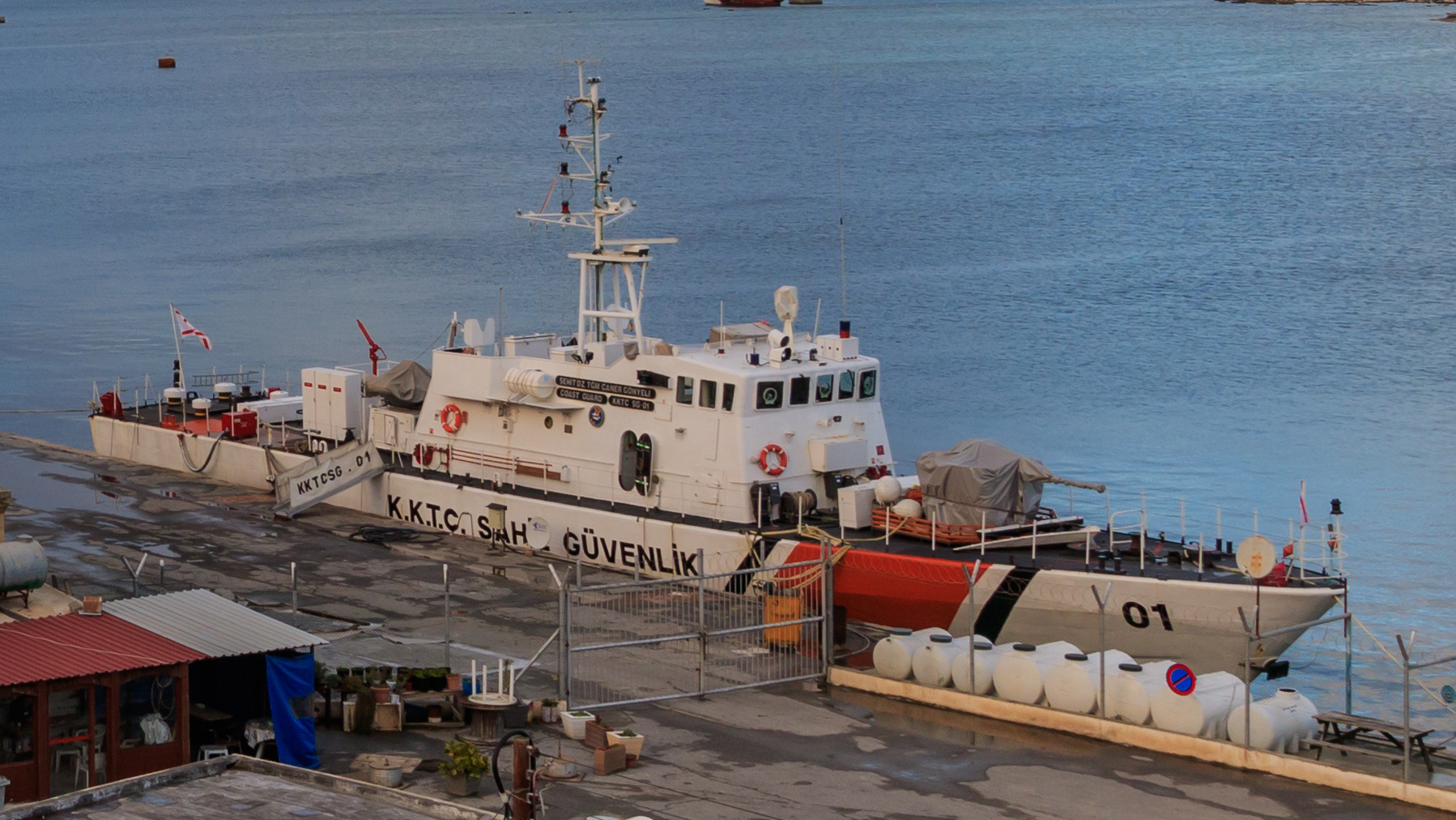
80 class KKTCSG-01 at the Port of Famagusta

== Equipment ==
Class	Quantity	Displacement	Origin
Patrol vessels
80 class	4	195 tons	Turkey
Ares 42 Hector	3	13 tons	Turkey
Ares 35 FPB	6	11.85 tons	Turkey
Landing craft mechanized
KKTCSG-301/303	2	113.4 tons	United States/Turkey

== See also ==
- Cyprus Turkish Peace Force Command
- Directorate General for Police
- TRNC Special Task Force Command
- Aviation Unit Command
