= TRNC Special Task Force Command =

Special Task Force Command (Turkish: Özel Görev Kuvveti Komutanlığı — ÖGKK) is special force unit within the Security Forces Command of the Turkish Republic of Northern Cyprus. Unit consisting of officers of different classes and ranks, non-commissioned officers, special officers and elite soldiers who have been selected and trained in all kinds of terrain and climatic conditions against the elimination of internal and external threats. ÖGKK was established in 1992, directly affiliated with the Security Forces Command.

== See also ==
- Security Forces Command
- Cyprus Turkish Peace Force Command KTBK
- TRNC Coast Guard Command
- Directorate General for Police
