= List of space forces, units, and formations =

This is a list of space forces, units, and formations that identifies the current and historical antecedents and insignia for the military space arms of countries fielding a space component, whether an independent space force, multinational commands, joint command, or as a part of another military service.

== Independent space forces ==
Country	Current	Service Indigenous name	Former	Established
China		People's Liberation Army Aerospace Force		2024
China		People's Liberation Army Strategic Support Force Space Systems Department		2015–2024
China		People's Liberation Army General Armaments Department		1998–2016
United States		United States Space Force		2019
United States		Air Force Space Command		1982–2019
United States		Space Command		1982–1985
United States		Strategic Air Command		1963–1984 (Note: Established as an Air Force major command in 1946. Gained Defense Meteorological Satellite Program in 1963 and Aerospace Defense Command's space forces in 1980. Transferred space forces to Space Command from 1982 to 1984)
United States		Aerospace Defense Command		1976–1980 (Note: Missile warning and space surveillance activities moved into Strategic Air Command in 1980)
United States		Fourteenth Aerospace Force (Aerospace Defense Command)		1968–1980 (Note: Fourteenth Aerospace Force inactivated in 1976 and space responsibilities centralized directly under Aerospace Defense Command)
United States		9th Aerospace Defense Division (Air Defense Command)		1961–1968
United States		Air Defense Command		1960–1961 (Note: Established as an Air Force major command in 1946. Gained space and missile warning responsibility in 1960)
United States		Air Force Security Service		1955–1964 (Note: Transferred missile surveillance radars to Air Defense Command in 1964–1966)
United States		Space and Missile Systems Center (Air Force Materiel Command)		1992–2001 (Note: Transferred to Air Force Space Command in 2001)
United States		Space Systems Division (Air Force Systems Command)		1989–1992 (Note: Launch mission transferred to Air Force Space Command in 1990)
United States		Space Division (Air Force Systems Command)		1979–1989
United States		Space and Missile Systems Organization (Air Force Systems Command)		1967–1979
United States		Space Systems Division (Air Force Systems Command)		1961–1967
United States		Air Force Ballistic Missile Organization (Air Research and Development Command)		1957–1961
United States		Western Development Division (Air Research and Development Command)		1954–1957
United States		Air Research and Development Command		1950–1954
United States		Air Materiel Command		1947–1951 (Note: Space and missile program transferred to Air Research and Development Command in 1950)
United States		United States Army Air Forces		1945–1947 (Note: Space and missile program started in 1945 and space mission claimed in 1946)

== Air and space forces ==
Country	Current	Service Indigenous name	Former	Established
Colombia		Colombian Aerospace Force		2023
France		French Space Command (French Air and Space Force)		2019
France		Joint Space Command (French Air Force)		2010–2019
Iran		Iranian Space Command (Islamic Revolutionary Guard Corps Aerospace Force)		2020
Netherlands		Royal Netherlands Air and Space Force		2025
Russia (1992–present); Commonwealth of Independent States (1991–1992); Soviet Union (1955–1991)		Russian Space Forces (Russian Aerospace Forces)		2015 (Note: Missile interceptors moved into the Aerospace Forces' Air and Missile Defense Forces)
Russia (1992–present); Commonwealth of Independent States (1991–1992); Soviet Union (1955–1991)		Russian Space Command (Russian Aerospace Defence Forces)		2011–2015 (Note: Aerospace Defence Forces merged air defense and the Space Force's missile defense and space assets into one service)
Russia (1992–present); Commonwealth of Independent States (1991–1992); Soviet Union (1955–1991)		Russian Space Forces		2001–2011
Russia (1992–present); Commonwealth of Independent States (1991–1992); Soviet Union (1955–1991)		Russian Strategic Rocket Forces		1997–2001
Russia (1992–present); Commonwealth of Independent States (1991–1992); Soviet Union (1955–1991)		Military Space Forces		1992–1997 (Note: Merged into the Strategic Rocket Forces in 1997)
Russia (1992–present); Commonwealth of Independent States (1991–1992); Soviet Union (1955–1991)		Rocket and Space Defence Troops (Russian Air Defence Forces)		1992–1997 (Note: Rocket and Space Defence Troops moved into the Strategic Rocket Forces, while aviation and air defense forces merged into the Russian Air Force in 1997)
Russia (1992–present); Commonwealth of Independent States (1991–1992); Soviet Union (1955–1991)		Anti-Ballistic Missile and Anti-Space Defense Forces (Soviet Air Defense Forces)		1967–1992
Russia (1992–present); Commonwealth of Independent States (1991–1992); Soviet Union (1955–1991)		Chief Directorate of Space Assets (Soviet Ministry of Defence)		1986–1992
Russia (1992–present); Commonwealth of Independent States (1991–1992); Soviet Union (1955–1991)		Main Directorate of Space Assets (Soviet Armed Forces General Staff)		1982–1986
Russia (1992–present); Commonwealth of Independent States (1991–1992); Soviet Union (1955–1991)		Main Directorate of Space Assets (Soviet Strategic Rocket Forces)		1970–1982
Russia (1992–present); Commonwealth of Independent States (1991–1992); Soviet Union (1955–1991)		Central Directorate of Space Assets (Soviet Strategic Rocket Forces)		1964–1970
Russia (1992–present); Commonwealth of Independent States (1991–1992); Soviet Union (1955–1991)		3rd Department of the Main Missile Directorate of the Ministry of Defence		1960–1964
Russia (1992–present); Commonwealth of Independent States (1991–1992); Soviet Union (1955–1991)		Artillery of the Supreme High Command Reserve		1955–1959
Spain		Spanish Air and Space Force		2022

== Joint and multinational space commands ==
Country	Current	Service Indigenous name	Former	Established
Australia		Defence Space Command		2022
Canada; United States		North American Aerospace Defense Command		1981
Canada; United States		North American Air Defense Command		1960–1981 (Note: Established as a command in 1958. Gained space and missile warning responsibility in 1960)
India		Defence Space Agency		2018
Italy		Space Operations Command		2020
Mexico		Mexican Secretariat of National Defense		2019
NATO		NATO Space Centre (Allied Air Command)		2020
NATO		Allied Air Command		2013
Peru		National Commission for Aerospace Research and Development (Peruvian Ministry of Defense)		1974
South Korea		Agency for Defense Development (Republic of Korea Ministry of National Defense)		1970
Spain		Instituto Nacional de Técnica Aeroespacial		1942
United Kingdom		United Kingdom Space Command (Royal Air Force)		2021
United Kingdom		United Kingdom Strategic Command		2019–2021
United Kingdom		Joint Forces Command		2012–2019
United States		United States Space Command		2019
United States		Joint Force Space Component Command (U.S. Strategic Command)		2017–2019
United States		Joint Functional Component Command for Space (U.S. Strategic Command)		2006–2017
United States		Joint Space Operations (U.S. Strategic Command)		2005–2006
United States		United States Strategic Command		2002–2005
United States		United States Space Command		1985–2002
United States		Aerospace Defense Command		1975–1986 (Note: Specified combatant command from 1975 to 1986)
United States		Continental Air Defense Command		1960–1975
United States		Advanced Research Projects Agency		1958–1959

== Service space units and formations ==
Country	Current	Service Indigenous name	Former	Established
Australia		Australian Space Operations Centre and No. 1 Remote Sensor Unit RAAF (Royal Australian Air Force)		2015
Brazil		Aerospace Operations Command (Brazilian Air Force)		2017
Canada		3 Canadian Space Division (Royal Canadian Air Force)		2022
Germany		Bundeswehr Space Command (German Air Force)		2021
Germany		Air and Space Operations Centre (German Air Force)		2020
Germany		Space Situational Awareness Center (German Air Force)		2009
Greece		Space Operations Command (Hellenic Air Force)		2026
Iran		Islamic Republic of Iran Air Force		2021
Israel		Space Branch (Israeli Air Force)		1988
Japan		Space Operations Group (Japan Air Self Defense Force)		2020
Luxembourg		Luxembourg Army		2017
New Zealand		Royal New Zealand Air Force		2025
North Korea		Korean People's Army Air Force		2023 (Note: the Korean People's Army Air and Anti-Air Force also became a space force, decades from its founding in 1946, with the launch of the Malligyong-1)
Pakistan		Space Command (Pakistan Air Force)		2021
South Africa		South African Space Command Section (South African Air Force)		2024
South Korea		Republic of Korea Air Force		2021 (Note: the Republic of Korea Air Force launches its space ops center from its HQ)
Thailand		Royal Thai Air Force		2020
Turkey		Space Command Reconnaissance Satellites Command; Air and Space Force Development Center		2005
United Kingdom		No. 23 Squadron (Royal Air Force)		2021
United Kingdom		1001 Signal Unit (Royal Air Force)		1966–2003 (Note: Skynet operations assumed by Airbus Defence and Space)
United States		Army Space and Missile Defense Command		1997
United States		Army Space and Strategic Defense Command		1992–1997
United States		Army Space Command		1988–2003 (Note: Subordinated to Army Space and Strategic Defense Command in 1992)
United States		Army Space Agency		1986–1988
United States		Army Space Planning Group		1985–1986
United States		Army Staff Program Element at Air Force Space Command		1984–1985
United States		Army Strategic Defense Command		1985–1992
United States		Ballistic Missile Defense Organization		1974–1985
United States		Safeguard program		1969–1974
United States		Sentinel program		1967–1969
United States		Nike–X Project Office		1964–1967
United States		Nike–Zeus Project Office (Army Missile Command)		1962–1964
United States		Army Ballistic Missile Agency (Army Ordnance Missile Command)		1956–1961 (Note: Space and rocket program transferred to NASA becoming the Marshall Space Flight Center)
United States		Army Ordnance Corps		1950–1956
United States		Army Ordnance Department		1945–1950 (Note: Ballistic missile program started in 1945)
United States		Army Information Systems Command		1984–1988 (Note: Defense Satellite Communications System transferred to Army Space Command)
United States		Army Communications Command		1973–1984
United States		Army Strategic Communications Command		1964–1973 (Note: Activated to run the Defense Satellite Communications System)
United States		Army Signal Corps		1958–1964 (Note: Communication and weather satellite projects started in 1958)
United States		Marine Corps Forces Space Command		2020
United States		Marine Corps Forces Strategic Command		2002–2020
United States		Navy Space Command / Tenth Fleet		2020
United States		Fleet Cyber Command / Tenth Fleet		2010–2020
United States		Naval Network Warfare Command		2002–2010 (Note: Subordinated to Fleet Cyber Command/Tenth Fleet)
United States		Naval Space Command		1983–2002
United States		Naval Astronautics Group		1962–1983 (Note: Subordinated to Naval Space Command in 1983. Renamed the Naval Satellite Operations Center in 1990)
United States		Naval Space Surveillance Center		1960–1983 (Note: Subordinated to Naval Space Command in 1983. Later transferred to Air Force Space Command's 20th Space Control Squadron in 2004)
United States		Naval Information Warfare Systems Command		2019
United States		Space and Naval Warfare Systems Command		1985–2019
United States		Naval Electronic Systems Command		1966–1985
United States		Naval Air Systems Command		1964–1974 (Note: Astronautics programs transferred to Naval Electronic Systems Command in 1974)
United States		Naval Material Command		1966–1974 (Note: Astronautics programs transferred to Naval Electronic Systems Command in 1974)
United States		Bureau of Naval Weapons		1962–1965 (Note: Range operations transferred to Navy Material Command and astronautics programs transferred to Naval Air Systems Command in 1966)
United States		Bureau of Ships		1961–1964 (Note: Assumed responsibility for satellite communications in 1961; responsibilities transferred to Naval Air Systems Command in 1964)
United States		Project Vanguard (Naval Research Laboratory)		1955–1958 (Note: Turned over to NASA in 1958 and became the core of Goddard Space Flight Center)
United States		Naval Research Laboratory		1944–1955 (Note: Space science and rocketry program started in 1944)
United States		First Air Force (Air Combat Command)		2021
United States		United States Coast Guard Research and Development Center		2018
Vietnam		Vietnam Air Defence - Air Force		2022

== See also ==
- List of air forces
- List of armies by country
- List of militaries by country
- List of navies
- Ranks and insignia of space forces
