= Hayri Ündül =

Turkish military officer (1929–2014)

- Born: 1929; Muğla, Turkey
- Died: 25 November 2014 (aged 84–85); İzmir, Turkey
- Education: Turkish Military Academy
- Military career
- Allegiance: Turkey
- Branch: Turkish Land Forces
- Rank: Lieutenant general
- Other work: Undersecretary of the Turkish National Intelligence Agency

Hayri Ündül (1929 – 25 November 2014) was a Turkish military officer who served as the director of the National Intelligence Organization between 1986 and 1988.

== Early life and education ==
He was born in Muğla in 1929. He was a graduate of the Turkish Military Academy.

== Career ==
Ündül was promoted to brigadier general in 1976 after serving in various posts in the Turkish Armed Forces, including Cyprus Turkish Peace Forces Command during the 1974 intervention of the Turkish military. He was the first commander of the Security Forces Command based in Kyrenia, Cyprus, which he held between 1976 and 1978. He became a major general in 1980 and rose to the rank of lieutenant general in 1985. Then he was appointed as the commander of the 7th Corps.

Ündül served as director of the National Intelligence Organization between 5 September 1986 and 29 August 1988. After this post he was named as the undersecretary of the Ministry of National Defense and retired from this position.

== Death ==
Ündül died of respiratory failure at his home in İzmir on 25 November 2014. Next day, he was buried in Muğla.
