= List of armies by country =

This is a list of Armies of the countries of the World.

== List of armies by country ==
Country	Army	Founded	Endonym	Ref.
Abkhazia	Abkhazia Army	1992; 34 years ago	Abkhaz: Абџьарирқәу Амҷқәа Аԥсны, romanized: Abd̂ʹarirķəu Amc̦ķəa Aṕsny	
Afghanistan	Islamic National Army	1722; 304 years ago	Pashto: افغان ملي پوځ, romanized: Afǧān millí pawź	
Albania	Albanian Land Force	2000; 26 years ago	Albanian: Forca Tokësore të Republikës së Shqipërisë	
Algeria	Algerian Land Forces	1962; 64 years ago	Arabic: القوات البرية الجزائرية	
Angola	Angolan Army	1974; 52 years ago	Portuguese: Exército	
Antigua and Barbuda	Antigua and Barbuda Regiment	1995; 31 years ago	—N/a	
Argentina	Argentine Army	1810; 216 years ago	Spanish: Ejército Argentino	
Armenia	Armenian Ground Forces	1992; 34 years ago	Armenian: Հայաստանի ցամաքային ուժեր, romanized: Hayastani ts’amak’ayin uzher	
Australia	Australian Army	1901; 125 years ago	—N/a	
Austria	Austrian Land Forces	1920; 106 years ago	German: Landstreitkräfte	
Azerbaijan	Azerbaijani Land Forces	1918; 108 years ago	Azerbaijani: Azərbaycan Silahlı Qüvvələri Quru Qoşunları	
Bahrain	Royal Bahraini Army	1969; 57 years ago	Arabic: الجيش البحريني, romanized: al-jayš al-baḥraynī	
Bangladesh	Bangladesh Army	1971; 55 years ago	Bengali: বাংলাদেশ সেনাবাহিনী, romanized: Baṅladex Sēnābāhinī	
Barbados	Barbados Regiment	1902; 124 years ago	—N/a	
Belarus	Belarusian Ground Forces	1992; 34 years ago	Belarusian: Сухапутныя войскі Рэспублікі Беларусь, romanized: Suxopútnyj vójski Respúblika Bjelarúsʹ	
Belgium	Belgian Army	1830; 196 years ago	Dutch: Landmacht, French: Force Terrestre	
Belize	Belize Defence Force	1978; 48 years ago	—N/a	
Benin	Benin Army	1960; 66 years ago	French: Armée de Terre	
Bhutan	Royal Bhutan Army	1958; 68 years ago	Dzongkha: བསྟན་སྲུང་དམག་སྡེ་, romanized: bStan-srung dmag-sde	
Bolivia	Bolivian Army	1810; 216 years ago	Spanish: Ejército de Bolivia	
Bosnia and Herzegovina	Bosnian Ground Forces	2006; 20 years ago	Serbo-Croatian: Oružane snage	
Botswana	Botswana Ground Force	1977; 49 years ago	—N/a	
Brazil	Brazilian Army	1822; 204 years ago	Brazilian Portuguese: Exército Brasileiro	
Brunei	Royal Brunei Land Force	1961; 65 years ago	Malay: Tentera Darat Diraja Brunei	
Bulgaria	Bulgarian Land Forces	1878; 148 years ago	Bulgarian: Сухопътни войски на България, romanized: Sukhopŭtni vojskí na Bǎlgárija	
Burkina Faso	Burkina Faso Ground Force	1961; 65 years ago	French: L'Armée de Terre	
Burundi	Burundi Army	2005; 21 years ago	French: L'Armée de Terre	
Cambodia	Royal Cambodian Army	1953; 73 years ago	Khmer: កងទ័ពជើងគោក, romanized: kɑɑng tŏəp cəəng koŭk	
Cameroon	Cameroon Army	1960; 66 years ago	French: Armée de terre	
Canada	Canadian Army	1855; 171 years ago	French: Armée canadienne	
Cape Verde	Cape Verdean National Guard	1975; 51 years ago	Portuguese: Guarda National	
Central African Republic	Central African Ground Forces	1960; 66 years ago	French: Armée de Terre	
Chad	Chadian Ground Forces	1960; 66 years ago	French: Armée de terre tchadienne	
Chile	Chilean Army	1810; 216 years ago	Spanish: Ejército de Chile	
China (PRC)	People's Liberation Army Ground Force	1927; 99 years ago	Chinese: 中国人民解放军陆军; pinyin: Zhōngguó Rénmín Jiěfàngjūn Lùjūn	
Colombia	Colombian National Army	1819; 207 years ago	Spanish: Ejército Nacional de Colombia	
Comoros	Comorian Army	1997; 29 years ago	French: Armée de Terre	
Democratic Republic of the Congo	Land Forces of the Democratic Republic of the Congo	1961; 65 years ago	French: Forces du Terrestres	
Republic of the Congo	Congolese Army	1960; 66 years ago	French: Force terrestre congolaise	
Ivory Coast	Ivorian army	1961; 65 years ago	French: Armée de terre	
Croatia	Croatian Army	1991; 35 years ago	Croatian: Hrvatska kopnena vojska	
Cuba	Cuban Revolutionary Army	1959; 67 years ago	Spanish: Ejército Revolucionario	
Cyprus	Cypriot Ground Forces	1964; 62 years ago	Greek: Εθνοφυλακή, romanized: Ethnofylakí	
Czech Republic	Czech Land Forces	1993; 33 years ago	Czech: Pozemní síly Armády České republiky	
Denmark	Royal Danish Army	1614; 412 years ago	Danish: Hæren	
Djibouti	Djiboutian Army	1977; 49 years ago	French: Armée de terre	
Dominican Republic	Dominican Army	1844; 182 years ago	Spanish: Ejército de República Dominicana	
East Timor	Timor-Leste Army	2001; 25 years ago	Portuguese: Componente Terrestre; Tetun: Komponente Terrestre	
Ecuador	Ecuadorian Army	1830; 196 years ago	Spanish: Ejército Ecuatoriano	
Egypt	Egyptian Army	1820; 206 years ago	Arabic: القوات البرية المصرية	
El Salvador	Salvadoran Army	1824; 202 years ago	Spanish: Ejército Salvadoreño	
Equatorial Guinea	Army of Equatorial Guinea	1992; 34 years ago	Spanish: Ejército de Tierra de Guinea Ecuatorial	
Eritrea	Eritrean Army	1991; 35 years ago		
Estonia	Estonian Land Forces	1918; 108 years ago	Estonian: Maavägi	
Eswatini	Eswatini Army	1979; 47 years ago		
Ethiopia	Ethiopian Army	1987; 39 years ago		
Fiji	Fiji Infantry Regiment	1920; 106 years ago	—N/a	
Finland	Finnish Army	1918; 108 years ago	Finnish: Maavoimat/Swedish: Armén	
France	French Army	1420; 606 years ago	French: Armée de Terre	
Gabon	Gabonese Army	1960; 66 years ago	French: Armée de terre gabonaise	
Gambia	Gambian National Army	1965; 61 years ago	—N/a	
Georgia	Georgian Land Forces	1991; 35 years ago	Georgian: საქართველოს სახმელეთო ძალები, romanized: Sakartvelos sakhmeleto dzalebi	
Germany	German Army	1955; 71 years ago	German: Deutsches Heer	
Ghana	Ghana Army	1959; 67 years ago	—N/a	
Greece	Hellenic Army	1828; 198 years ago	Greek: Ελληνικός Στρατός, romanized: Ellinikós Stratós	
Guatemala	Guatemalan Army	1823; 203 years ago	Spanish: Fuerzas de Tierra del Ejército de Guatemala	
Guinea	People's Army of Guinea	1958; 68 years ago	French: Armée de terre	
Guinea-Bissau	Guinea-Bissau Army	1964; 62 years ago		
Guyana	Guyanese Army	1966; 60 years ago	—N/a	
Haiti	Haitian Army	2011; 15 years ago	French: Armée d'Haïti	
Honduras	Honduran Army	1825; 201 years ago	Spanish: Ejército de Honduras	
Hungary	Hungarian Ground Forces	1990; 36 years ago	Hungarian: Magyar Szárazföldi Haderő	
India	Indian Army	1950; 76 years ago	ISO: Bhāratīya Sēnā	
Indonesia	Indonesian Army	1945; 81 years ago	Indonesian: Tentara Nasional Indonesia Angkatan Darat	
Iran	Islamic Republic of Iran Ground Forces	1811; 215 years ago	Persian: نیروی زمینی ارتش جمهوری اسلامی ایران, romanized: Niruye Zaminiye Arteše Jomhuriye Eslâmiye Irân	
Iran	Ground Forces of the Islamic Revolutionary Guard Corps	1985; 41 years ago	Persian: نیروی زمینی سپاه پاسداران انقلاب اسلامی, romanized: Niroye Zamini Sepah Pasdaran Enghalab Eslami	
Iraq	Iraqi Ground Forces	1921; 105 years ago	Arabic: القوة البرية العراقية	
Ireland	Irish Army	1922; 104 years ago	Irish: an tArm	
Israel	Israeli Ground Forces	1948; 78 years ago	Hebrew: זְרוֹעַ הַיַּבָּשָׁה, romanized: z'róa hibshá	
Italy	Italian Army	1861; 165 years ago	Italian: Esercito Italiano	
Jamaica	Jamaica Defence Force	1926; 100 years ago	—N/a	
Japan	Japan Ground Self-Defense Force	1954; 72 years ago	Japanese: 陸上自衛隊, romanized: Rikujō Jieitai	
Jordan	Royal Jordanian Army	1920; 106 years ago	Arabic: القوّات البرية الاردنيّة	
Kazakhstan	Kazakh Ground Forces	1992; 34 years ago	Kazakh: Қазақстан Құрлық әскерлері, romanized: Qazaqstan Qūrlyq äskerlerı	
Kenya	Kenya Army	1964; 62 years ago	—N/a	
North Korea	Korean People's Army Ground Force	1947; 79 years ago	Korean: 조선인민군 륙군; Hanja: 朝鮮人民軍 陸軍	
South Korea	Republic of Korea Army	1948; 78 years ago	Korean: 대한민국 육군; Hanja: 大韓民國陸軍	
Kosovo	Kosovo Security Force	2009; 17 years ago	Albanian: Forca e Sigurisë së Kosovës	
Kuwait	Kuwait Army	1949; 77 years ago	Arabic: القوة البرية الكويتية	
Kyrgyzstan	Kyrgyz Army	2017; 9 years ago	Kyrgyz: Кыргызстандын Кургактагы Аскерлер	
Laos	Lao People's Army	1975; 51 years ago		
Latvia	Latvian Land Forces	1991; 35 years ago	Latvian: Sauszemes spēki	
Lebanon	Lebanese Ground Forces	1945; 81 years ago	Arabic: الجيش اللبناني	
Lesotho	Lesotho Army	1978; 48 years ago		
Liberia	23rd Infantry Brigade (Liberia)	1908; 118 years ago		
Libya	Libyan Ground Forces	2011; 15 years ago	Arabic: الجيش الليبي	
Lithuania	Lithuanian Land Force	1990; 36 years ago	Lithuanian: Lietuvos sausumos pajėgos	
Luxembourg	Luxembourg Army	1881; 145 years ago	Luxembourgish: Lëtzebuerger Arméi	
Madagascar	Malagasy Army	1960; 66 years ago	French: Armée de terre	
Malawi	Malawi Army	1964; 62 years ago	—N/a	
Malaysia	Malaysian Army	1933; 93 years ago	Malay: Tentera Darat Malaysia	
Mali	Malian Army	1960; 66 years ago	French: Armee de Terre	
Malta	Armed Forces of Malta	1973; 53 years ago	Maltese: Forzi Armati ta' Malta	
Mauritania	Mauritanian National Army	1960; 66 years ago	Arabic: القوات البرية الموريتانية; French: Armée de terre mauritanienne	
Mexico	Mexican Army	1884; 142 years ago	Spanish: Ejército Mexicano	
Moldova	Moldovan Ground Forces	1991; 35 years ago	Romanian: Forțele Terestre ale Republicii Moldova	
Monaco	Prince's Company of Carabiniers	1817; 209 years ago	Monégasque: Cumpagnia d'i Carrabiniei d'u Prìncipu	
Mongolia	Mongolian Ground Force	1992; 34 years ago	Mongolian: Монгол Улсын Зэвсэгт хүчний Хуурай замын цэрэг, romanized: Mongol Ulsyn Zevsegt hüchniy Huurai zamyn tsereg	
Montenegro	Montenegrin Ground Army	2006; 20 years ago	Montenegrin: Kopnena vojska Crne Gore; Копнена војска Црне Горе	
Morocco	Royal Moroccan Army	1956; 70 years ago	Arabic: الجيش الملكي المغربي	
Mozambique	Mozambican Army	1994; 32 years ago	Portuguese: Forças terrestres	
Myanmar	Myanmar Army	1945; 81 years ago	Burmese: တပ်မတော်(ကြည်း), romanized: Tatmadaw (Kyi)	
Namibia	Namibian Army	1990; 36 years ago	—N/a	
Nepal	Nepali Army	1768; 258 years ago	Nepali: नेपाली सेना, romanized: Nepālī Senā	
Netherlands	Royal Netherlands Army	1814; 212 years ago	Dutch: Koninklijke Landmacht	
New Zealand	New Zealand Army	1845; 181 years ago	Māori: Ngāti Tūmatauenga	
Nicaragua	Nicaraguan Army	1979; 47 years ago	Spanish: Ejército de Nicaragua	
Niger	Niger Army	1961; 65 years ago	French: L'armée de terre	
Nigeria	Nigerian Army	1963; 63 years ago	—N/a	
North Macedonia	Army of the Republic of North Macedonia	1992; 34 years ago	Macedonian: Армија на Република Северна Македонија, APCM, romanized: Armija na Republika Severna Makedonija	
Northern Cyprus	Northern Cyprus Army	1976; 50 years ago	Turkish: Güvenlik Kuvvetleri Komutanlığı	
Norway	Norwegian Army	1628; 398 years ago	Norwegian: Hæren	
Oman	Royal Army of Oman	1907; 119 years ago	Arabic: القوات المسلحة السلطانية العُمانية	
Pakistan	Pakistan Army	1947; 79 years ago	Urdu: پاکستان فوج, romanized: Pākistān Fãuj	
Palestine	Palestine Liberation Army	1964; 62 years ago	Arabic: جيش التحرير الفلسطيني	
Palestine	Palestinian National Security Forces	1994; 32 years ago	Arabic: قوات الأمن الوطني الفلسطيني	
Papua New Guinea	Papua New Guinea Land Element	1973; 53 years ago	—N/a	
Paraguay	Paraguayan Army	1811; 215 years ago	Spanish: Ejército Paraguayo	
Peru	Peruvian Army	1821; 205 years ago	Spanish: Ejército del Perú	
Philippines	Philippine Army	1897; 129 years ago	Filipino: Hukbong Katihan ng Pilipinas	
Poland	Polish Land Forces	1918; 108 years ago	Polish: Wojska Lądowe	
Portugal	Portuguese Army	1139; 887 years ago	Portuguese: Exército Português	
Qatar	Qatari Emiri Land Force	1971; 55 years ago	Arabic: القوات البرية القطرية	
Romania	Romanian Land Forces	1859; 167 years ago	Romanian: Forțele Terestre Române	
Russia	Russian Ground Forces	1992; 34 years ago	Russian: Сухопу́тные войска́, romanized: Sukhopútnye Voyská	
Rwanda	Rwandan Army	1962; 64 years ago	Kinyarwanda: Ingabo z'u Rwanda, French: Forces rwandaises de défense, Swahili: Nguvu ya Ulinzi ya Watu wa Rwanda	
Sahrawi Arab Democratic Republic	Sahrawi People's Liberation Army	1972; 54 years ago	جيش التحرير الشعبي الصحراوي	
Saint Kitts and Nevis	Saint Kitts and Nevis Defence Force	1896; 130 years ago	—N/a	
San Marino	Sammarinese Armed Forces	1406; 620 years ago	Italian: Forze Armate Sammarinesi	
São Tomé and Príncipe	Army of São Tomé and Príncipe	1975; 51 years ago	Portuguese: Forças Armadas de São Tomé e Príncipe	
Saudi Arabia	Saudi Arabian Army	1745; 281 years ago	Arabic: القُوَّاتُ البَرِّيَّةُ المَلَكِيَّة السُّعُودِيَّة, romanized: Al-Quwwat al-Bariyah al-Malakiyah as-Su'udiyah	
Senegal	Senegalese Army	1960; 66 years ago	French: Armée de terre sénégalaise	
Serbia	Serbian Army	1808; 218 years ago	Serbian: Копнена војска Србије, romanized: Kopnena vojska Srbije	
Seychelles	Seychelles Army	1977; 49 years ago		
Sierra Leone	Sierra Leone Army	1961; 65 years ago	—N/a	
Singapore	Singapore Army	1957; 69 years ago	Malay: Tentera Singapura	
Slovakia	Slovak Ground Forces	1993; 33 years ago	Slovak: Pozemné sily Ozbrojených síl Slovenskej republiky	
Slovenia	Slovenian Ground Force	1991; 35 years ago	Slovene: Slovenska vojska	
Somalia	Somali National Army (Note: Somalia's official military forces are in disarray due to the continuing Civil war in the country. Several areas and factions have their own militaries.)	1960; 66 years ago	Somali: Ciidanka Xooga Dalka Soomaaliyeed; Arabic: الجيش الوطني الصومالي	
Somaliland	Somaliland National Army	1993; 33 years ago	Somali: Ciidanka Qaranka Somaliland	
South Africa	South African Army	1912; 114 years ago	Afrikaans: Suid-Afrikaanse Leër; Zulu: Ibutho Lempi laseNingizimu Afrika	
South Ossetia	South Ossetia Army	1992; 34 years ago		
South Sudan	South Sudan Army	2017; 9 years ago	—N/a	
Spain	Spanish Army	1492; 534 years ago	Spanish: Ejército de Tierra	
Sri Lanka	Sri Lanka Army	1881; 145 years ago	Sinhala: ශ්රී ලංකා යුද්ධ හමුදාව, romanized: Sri Lanka Yuddha Hamudawa	
Sudan	Sudanese Army	1925; 101 years ago		
Suriname	Surinamese Land Forces	1975; 51 years ago	Dutch: Surinaamse Landmacht	
Sweden	Swedish Army	1521; 505 years ago	Swedish: Armén	
Switzerland	Swiss Army	1815; 211 years ago	German: Schweizer Armee; French: Armée suisse; Italian: Esercito svizzero	
Syria	Syrian Army	1945; 81 years ago	Arabic: الجيش العربي السوري, romanized: al-Jaysh al-'Arabi as-Sūrī	
Taiwan (ROC)	Republic of China Army	1924; 102 years ago	Chinese: 中華民國陸軍; Tongyong Pinyin: Jhōnghuá Mínguó Lùjūn; Tâi-lô: Tiong-huâ-bîn-kok lio̍k-kun	
Tajikistan	Tajik Ground Forces	1993; 33 years ago	Tajik: Нерӯҳои заминии Тоҷикистон, romanized: Nerŭhoi zaminii Tojikiston	
Tanzania	Tanzanian Army	1964; 62 years ago		
Thailand	Royal Thai Army	1874; 152 years ago	Thai: กองทัพบกไทย, romanized: kong thap bok thai	
Togo	Togolese Army	1960; 66 years ago	French: Armée de terre togolaise	
Tonga	Tongan Land Force	1939; 87 years ago		
Transnistria	Transnistria Army	1991; 35 years ago		
Trinidad and Tobago	Trinidad and Tobago Regiment	1962; 64 years ago	—N/a	
Tunisia	Tunisian Army	1831; 195 years ago	Arabic: جيش البر التونسي	
Turkey	Turkish Land Forces	1920; 106 years ago	Turkish: Türk Silahlı Kuvvetleri	
Turkmenistan	Turkmen Ground Forces	1992; 34 years ago	Turkmen: Türkmenistanyň gury ýer güýçleri	
Uganda	Ugandan Land Forces	1902; 124 years ago	—N/a	
Ukraine	Ukrainian Ground Forces	1991; 35 years ago;	Ukrainian: Сухопутні війська Збройних сил України, romanized: Sukhoputni viiska Zbroinykh syl Ukrainy	
United Arab Emirates	United Arab Emirates Army	1951; 75 years ago		
United Kingdom	British Army	1660; 366 years ago	—N/a	
United States	United States Army	1775; 251 years ago	—N/a	
Uruguay	National Army of Uruguay	1811; 215 years ago	Spanish: Ejército Nacional	
Uzbekistan	Uzbek Ground Forces	1992; 34 years ago	Uzbek: O'zbekiston quruqlik qo'shinlari	
Vanuatu	Vanuatu Mobile Forces	1980; 46 years ago		
Vatican City	Pontifical Swiss Guard	1506; 520 years ago	Latin: Pontificia Cohors Helvetica	
Venezuela	Venezuelan Army	1810; 216 years ago	Spanish: Ejército Nacional de la República Bolivariana de Venezuela	
Vietnam	Vietnam People's Ground Force	1944; 82 years ago	Vietnamese: Lục quân Nhân dân Việt Nam	
Yemen	Yemeni Land Forces	1962; 64 years ago	Arabic: القوات البرية اليمنية	
Zambia	Zambian Army	1968; 58 years ago	—N/a	
Zimbabwe	Zimbabwe National Army	1980; 46 years ago		

== See also ==
- List of militaries by country
- List of air forces
- List of gendarmeries
- List of marines and similar forces
- List of navies
- List of space forces
- List of military special forces units
- list of national guards, home guards and militias
