= List of navies =

This is a list of navies by country.

== List ==
Country	Navy	Founded	Endonym	Ref.
Albania	Albanian Naval Force	1925; 101 years ago	Albanian: Forcat e Mbrojtes Detare Shqipetare	
Algeria	Algerian National Navy	1963; 63 years ago	Arabic: البحرية الوطنية الجزائرية, romanized: albahriat alwataniat aljazayiria	
Angola	Angolan Navy	1977; 49 years ago	Portuguese: Marinha de Guerra Angolana	
Antigua and Barbuda	Antigua and Barbuda Coast Guard	1981; 45 years ago		
Argentina	Argentine Navy	1810; 216 years ago	Spanish: Armada de la República Argentina	
Australia	Royal Australian Navy	1911; 115 years ago		
Azerbaijan	Azerbaijani Navy	1919; 107 years ago	Azerbaijani: Azərbaycan hərbi dəniz qüvvələri	
Bahamas	Royal Bahamas Defence Force	1980; 46 years ago		
Bahrain	Royal Bahraini Naval Force	1969; 57 years ago	Arabic: البحرية الملكية البحرينية, romanized: albahriat almalakiat albahraynia	
Bangladesh	Bangladesh Navy	1971; 55 years ago	Bengali: বাংলাদেশ নৌ বাহিনী, romanized: Bānlādēśa naubāhinī	
Barbados	Barbados Coast Guard	1979; 47 years ago		
Belgium	Belgian Navy	1831; 195 years ago	Dutch: Marinecomponent; French: Composante Marine	
Belize	Belize Coast Guard	2005; 21 years ago		
Benin	Benin Navy	1978; 48 years ago	French: Forces navales béninoises	
Bolivia	Bolivian Navy	1963; 63 years ago	Spanish: Fuerza Naval Boliviana	
Brazil	Brazilian Navy	1822; 204 years ago	Portuguese: Marinha do Brasil	
Brunei	Royal Brunei Navy	1965; 61 years ago	Malay: Tentera Laut Diraja Brunei	
Bulgaria	Bulgarian Navy	1899; 127 years ago	Bulgarian: Военноморски сили на Република България, romanized: Voennomorski sili na Republika Balgariya	
Cambodia	Royal Cambodian Navy	1953; 73 years ago	Khmer: កងទ័ពជើងទឹក, romanized: Kângtoăp Cheung Tœ̆k	
Cameroon	Cameroon Navy	1960; 66 years ago	French: Marine nationale	
Canada	Royal Canadian Navy	1910; 116 years ago	French: Marine royale canadienne	
Cape Verde	Cape Verdean Coast Guard	1975; 51 years ago	Portuguese: Guarda Costeira	
Cayman Islands	Cayman Islands Coast Guard	2021; 5 years ago		
Chile	Chilean Navy	1817; 209 years ago	Spanish: Armada de Chile	
China	People's Liberation Army Navy	1949; 77 years ago	Chinese: 中国人民解放军海军; pinyin: Zhōngguó Rénmín Jiěfàngjūn Hǎijūn	
Republic of China (Taiwan)	Republic of China Navy	1924; 102 years ago	Chinese: 中華民國海軍; pinyin: Zhōnghuá Mínguó Hǎijūn	
Colombia	Colombian National Navy	1823; 203 years ago	Spanish: Armada Nacional de Colombia	
Comoros	Comorian Navy	1997; 29 years ago	French: Garde-côtes	
Democratic Republic of the Congo	Navy of the Democratic Republic of the Congo	1960; 66 years ago	French: Marine Nationale	
Republic of the Congo	(Republic of the Congo) Congolese Navy	1960; 66 years ago	French: Marine Nationale	
Costa Rica	Costa Rican Coast Guard	1949; 77 years ago	Spanish: Guardia Civil	
Croatia	Croatian Navy	1991; 35 years ago	Croatian: Hrvatska Ratna Mornarica	
Cuba	Cuban Revolutionary Navy	1963; 63 years ago	Spanish: Marina de Guerra Revolucionaria	
Cyprus	Cyprus Navy	1964; 62 years ago	Greek: Ναυτική Διοίκηση Κύπρου, romanized: Naftikí Dioíkisi Kýprou; Turkish: Kıbrıs Deniz Kuvvetleri	
Northern Cyprus	(Northern Cyprus) TRNC Coast Guard Command	1978; 48 years ago	Turkish: KKTC Sahil Güvenlik Komutanlığı	
Denmark	Royal Danish Navy	1510; 516 years ago	Danish: Søværnet	
Djibouti	Djiboutian Navy	1979; 47 years ago	French: Marine Nationale Djiboutienne, lit. 'Djiboutian National Navy' Arabic: البحرية الجيبوتية, romanized: Al-Baḥriyya al-Jībūtiyya	
Dominican Republic	Dominican Navy	1844; 182 years ago	Spanish: Armada de República Dominicana	
Ecuador	Ecuadorian Navy	1832; 194 years ago	Spanish: Armada del Ecuador	
Egypt	Egyptian Navy	1967; 59 years ago	Arabic: البحرية المصرية, romanized: El-Quwwāt el-Bahareya el-Miṣriyya	
El Salvador	Navy of El Salvador	1951; 75 years ago	Spanish: Fuerza Naval de El Salvador	
Equatorial Guinea	Navy of Equatorial Guinea	1968; 58 years ago	Spanish: Marina de guerra	
Eritrea	Eritrean Navy	1961; 65 years ago		
Estonia	Estonian Navy	1918; 108 years ago	Estonian: Merevägi	
Ethiopia	Ethiopian Navy	1955; 71 years ago		
Fiji	Republic of Fiji Navy	1975; 51 years ago		
Finland	Finnish Navy	1918; 108 years ago	Finnish: Suomen merivoimat Swedish: Finländska marinen	
France	French Navy	1624; 402 years ago	French: Marine Nationale	
Gabon	Gabonese Navy	1960; 66 years ago	French: Marine Nationale	
Gambia	Gambian Navy	1965; 61 years ago		
Georgia	Coast Guard of Georgia	1998; 28 years ago	Georgian: საქართველოს სანაპირო დაცვა, romanized: sakartvelos sanap'iro datsva	
Germany	German Navy	1956; 70 years ago	German: Deutsche Marine	
Ghana	Ghana Navy	1959; 67 years ago		
Greece	Hellenic Navy	1828; 198 years ago	Greek: Πολεμικό Ναυτικό, romanized: Polemikó Naftikó	
Grenada	Coast Guard of Grenada	1974; 52 years ago		
Guatemala	Guatemalan Navy	1959; 67 years ago	Spanish: Armada de Guatemala	
Guinea	Navy of Guinea-Conakry	1958; 68 years ago	French: Marine de guerre	
Guinea-Bissau	(Guinea-Bissau) Guinean Navy	1973; 53 years ago	Portuguese: Marinha Nacional Popular	
Guyana	Guyanese Coast Guard	1966; 60 years ago		
Haiti	(Haiti) Haitian Coast Guard	2011; 15 years ago	French: Commissariat des Gardes-Côtes d'Haïti	
Honduras	Honduran Navy	1976; 50 years ago	Spanish: Fuerza Naval de Honduras	
Hungary	Hungarian River Guard	1945; 81 years ago	Hungarian: Folyamőr Ezred	
Iceland	Icelandic Coast Guard	1926; 100 years ago	Icelandic: Landhelgisgæsla Íslands	
India	Indian Navy	1612; 414 years ago	Hindi: भारतीय नौसेना, romanized: bhaarateey nausena	
Indonesia	Indonesian Navy	1945; 81 years ago	Indonesian: Tentara Nasional Indonesia Angkatan Laut	
Iran	Islamic Republic of Iran Navy	1923; 103 years ago	Persian: نیروی دریایی ارتش جمهوری اسلامی ایران, romanized: Niru-ye Daryâ'i-ye Artesh-e Jomhuri-ye Eslâmi-ye Irân	
Iran	Islamic Revolutionary Guard Corps Navy	1985; 41 years ago	Persian: نیروی دریایی سپاه پاسداران انقلاب اسلامی, romanized: niru-ye daryâyi-e sepâh-e pâsdârân-e enghelâb-e eslâmi	
Iraq	Iraqi Navy	1937; 89 years ago	Arabic: البحرية العراقية, romanized: albahriat aleiraqia	
Ireland	Irish Naval Service	1946; 80 years ago	Irish: An tSeirbhís Chabhlaigh	
Israel	Israeli Navy	1948; 78 years ago	Hebrew: חיל הים הישראלי, romanized: Ḥeil HaYam HaYisraeli	
Italy	Italian Navy	1861; 165 years ago	Italian: Marina Militare	
Ivory Coast	(Ivory Coast) Ivorian Navy	1960; 66 years ago	French: Marine Nationale	
Jamaica	Jamaica Defence Force Coast Guard	1963; 63 years ago		
Japan	Japan Maritime Self-Defense Force	1954; 72 years ago	Japanese: 海上自衛隊, romanized: Kaijō Jieitai	
Jordan	Royal Jordanian Navy	1951; 75 years ago	Arabic: القوة البحرية الاردنية, romanized: alquat albahriat alardinia	
Kazakhstan	Kazakh Naval Forces	1993; 33 years ago	Kazakh: Қазақстан Әскери-теңіз күштері, romanized: Qazaqstan Äskeri-teñız küşterı	
Kenya	Kenya Navy	1964; 62 years ago	Swahili: Jeshi la Wanamaji	
Kuwait	Kuwait Navy	1961; 65 years ago	Arabic: القوة البحرية الكويتية, romanized: Al-Quwwat Al-Bahriyah Al-Kuwaitiyah	
Laos	(Laos) Lao People's Navy	1975; 51 years ago		
Latvia	Latvian Naval Forces	1919; 107 years ago	Latvian: Latvijas Jūras Spēki	
Lebanon	Lebanese Navy	1950; 76 years ago	Arabic: القوات البحرية اللبنانية, romanized: Al-qūwātu al-Baḥriyya al-Lubnāniyya	
Liberia	(Liberia) Liberian National Coast Guard	1959; 67 years ago		
Libya	Libyan Navy	1962; 64 years ago	Arabic: القوات البحرية الليبية, romanized: alquaat albahriat alliybia	
Lithuania	Lithuanian Naval Force	1935; 91 years ago	Lithuanian: Lietuvos Karinės Jūrų Pajėgos	
Madagascar	Madagascar Navy	1960; 66 years ago	Malagasy: Tafika andranomasina French: Marine de Madagascar	
Malawi	Malawi Marine Unit	1978; 48 years ago		
Malaysia	Royal Malaysian Navy	1934; 92 years ago	Malay: Tentera Laut Diraja Malaysia	
Maldives	Maldivian Coast Guard	1980; 46 years ago		
Malta	Maritime Squadron of the Armed Forces of Malta	1970; 56 years ago	Maltese: Skwadra Marittima tal-Forzi Armati ta' Malta	
Mauritania	Mauritanian Navy	1966; 60 years ago	Arabic: القوات البحرية, romanized: alquaat albahria	
Mauritius	National Coast Guard of Mauritius	1968; 58 years ago	Morisyen: Gad Kòt Nasyonal; French: Marine Mauricienne	
Mexico	Mexican Navy	1821; 205 years ago	Spanish: Armada de México	
Montenegro	Montenegrin Navy	2006; 20 years ago	Montenegrin: Mornarica Vojske Crne Gore	
Morocco	Royal Moroccan Navy	1960; 66 years ago	Arabic: البحرية الملكية المغربية, romanized: alquaat albahriat almalakiat almaghribia	
Mozambique	Mozambique Navy	1994; 32 years ago	Portuguese: Marinha de Guerra de Moçambique	
Myanmar	Myanmar Navy	1947; 79 years ago	Burmese: တပ်မတော် (ရေ), romanized: Tapma.tau (ray)	
Namibia	Namibian Navy	2004; 22 years ago		
The Netherlands	Royal Netherlands Navy	1488; 538 years ago	Dutch: Koninklijke Marine	
(Netherlands) Dutch Caribbean	(Netherlands) Dutch Caribbean Coast Guard	1996; 30 years ago	Dutch: Kustwacht Caribisch Gebied	
New Zealand	Royal New Zealand Navy	1941; 85 years ago	Māori: Te Taua Moana o Aotearoa	
Nicaragua	Nicaraguan Navy	1980; 46 years ago	Spanish: Fuerza Naval del Ejercito de Nicaragua	
Nigeria	Nigerian Navy	1956; 70 years ago		
North Korea	Korean People's Navy	1946; 80 years ago	Korean: 조선인민군 해군; MR: Chosŏn inmin'gun haegun	
North Macedonia	Macedonian Lake Patrol Police	1991; 35 years ago	Macedonian: Македонска езерска полиција	
Norway	Royal Norwegian Navy	1814; 212 years ago	Norwegian: Sjøforsvaret	
Oman	Royal Navy of Oman	1970; 56 years ago	Arabic: بحرية عمان السلطانية, romanized: bihriat euman alsultania	
Pakistan	Pakistan Navy	1947; 79 years ago	Urdu: پاکستان بحریہ, romanized: Pākistān Bāhrí'a	
Palestine	(Palestine) Palestinian Naval Police	1995; 31 years ago	Arabic: الشرطة البحرية, romanized: alshurtat albahria	
Panama	(Panama) National Aeronaval Service	2008; 18 years ago	Spanish: Servicio Nacional Aeronaval	
Papua New Guinea	Papua New Guinea Maritime Element	1973; 53 years ago		
Paraguay	Paraguayan Navy	1811; 215 years ago	Spanish: Armada Paraguaya	
Peru	Peruvian Navy	1821; 205 years ago	Spanish: Marina de Guerra del Perú	
Philippines	Philippine Navy	1898; 128 years ago	Tagalog: Hukbong Dagat ng Pilipinas; Spanish: Fuerza Naval de Filipinas	
Poland	Polish Navy	1918; 108 years ago	Polish: Marynarka Wojenna RP	
Portugal	Portuguese Navy	1317; 709 years ago	Portuguese: Marinha Portuguesa	
Qatar	Qatari Emiri Navy	1971; 55 years ago	Arabic: البحرية الأميري القطرية, romanized: Al-Bahriyah Al-Amiriyah Al-Qatariyah	
Romania	Romanian Naval Forces	1860; 166 years ago	Romanian: Forţele Navale Române	
Russia	Russian Navy	1696; 330 years ago	Russian: Военно-морской флот Российской Федерации, romanized: Voyenno-morskoy flot Rossiyskoy Federatsii	
São Tomé and Príncipe	São Tomé and Príncipe Coast Guard	1968; 58 years ago	Portuguese: Guarda Costeira	
Saudi Arabia	(Saudi Arabia) Royal Saudi Naval Forces	1957; 69 years ago	Arabic: البَحْريَّة الْمَلكيَّة السُّعُودِيَّة, romanized: Al-Quwwat al-Bahriyah al-Arabiyah as-Su'udiyah	
Senegal	(Senegal) Senegalese Navy	1975; 51 years ago	French: Armée de mer	
Seychelles	Seychelles Coast Guard	1992; 34 years ago		
Serbia	Serbian River Flotilla	1915; 111 years ago	Serbian: Речна флотила, romanized: Rečna flotila	
Sierra Leone	Sierra Leone Navy	1981; 45 years ago		
Singapore	Republic of Singapore Navy	1967; 59 years ago	Malay: Angkatan Laut Republik Singapura	
Slovenia	Slovenia Navy	1993; 33 years ago	Slovene: Slovenska Mornarica	
Somalia	Somali Navy	1964; 62 years ago	Somali: Ciidamada Badda Soomaaliyeed	
South Africa	South African Navy	1922; 104 years ago	Afrikaans: Suid-Afrikaanse Vloot	
South Korea	Republic of Korea Navy	1945; 81 years ago	Korean: 대한민국 해군; RR: Daehanminguk haegun	
Spain	Spanish Navy	1479; 547 years ago	Spanish: Armada Española	
Sri Lanka	Sri Lanka Navy	1950; 76 years ago	Sinhala: ශ්‍රී ලංකා නාවික හමුදාව, romanized: Sri Lanka Navika Hamudawa	
Saint Kitts and Nevis	Saint Kitts and Nevis Coast Guard	1896; 130 years ago		
Saint Vincent and the Grenadines	Saint Vincent and the Grenadines Coast Guard	1980; 46 years ago		
Sudan	Sudanese Navy	1962; 64 years ago	Arabic: الحرس الجمهوري, romanized: alharas aljumhuriu	
Suriname	Suriname Navy	1977; 49 years ago		
Sweden	Swedish Navy	1522; 504 years ago	Swedish: Kungliga flottan	
Switzerland	(Switzerland) Swiss Lakes Flotilla	1941; 85 years ago	German: Motorbootkompanie	
Syria	Syrian Navy	1950; 76 years ago	Arabic: الْبَحْرِيَّةُ الْعَرَبِيَّةُ السُّورِيَّةُ, romanized: al-Baḥrīyah al-ʿArabīyah as-Sūrīyah	
Tanzania	Tanzania Naval Command	1971; 55 years ago	Swahili: Kamandi ya Jeshi la Majini	
Thailand	Royal Thai Navy	1887; 139 years ago	Thai: กองทัพเรือไทย, romanized: kong thap ruea thai	
Timor-Leste	(Timor-Leste) East Timorese Navy	2002; 24 years ago	Portuguese: Componente Naval das F-FDTL	
Togo	Togolese Navy	1960; 66 years ago	French: Marine Nationale	
Tonga	Tongan Navy	1973; 53 years ago		
Trinidad and Tobago	Trinidad and Tobago Coast Guard	1962; 64 years ago		
Tunisia	Tunisian National Navy	1956; 70 years ago	French: Marine nationale tunisienne	
Turkey	Turkish Navy	1920; 106 years ago	Turkish: Türk Deniz Kuvvetleri	
Turkmenistan	Turkmen Naval Forces	1992; 34 years ago	Turkmen: Türkmenistanyň Harby-deňiz Güýçleriis	
Ukraine	Ukrainian Navy	1992; 34 years ago	Ukrainian: Військово-морські сили Збройних сил України, romanized: Viysʹkovo-morsʹki syly Zbroynykh syl Ukrayiny	
United Arab Emirates	United Arab Emirates Navy	1971; 55 years ago	Arabic: البحرية الامارات العربية المتحدة, romanized: al-Baḥrīyah alamarat alearabiat almutahida	
United Kingdom	Royal Navy	1546; 480 years ago		
United States	United States Navy	1775; 251 years ago		
Uruguay	National Navy of Uruguay	1817; 209 years ago	Spanish: Armada Nacional de Uruguay	
Uzbekistan	Uzbek River Force	1992; 34 years ago	Uzbek: Amudaryo daryo floti	
Venezuela	Bolivarian Navy of Venezuela	1811; 215 years ago	Spanish: Armada Bolivariana de Venezuela	
Vietnam	Vietnam People's Navy	1955; 71 years ago	Vietnamese: Hải quân Nhân dân Việt Nam	
Yemen	Yemeni Navy	1990; 36 years ago	Arabic: القوات البحرية اليمنية, romanized: alquaat albahriat alyamania	

== See also ==
- Command of the sea
- Coast guards
- Maritime republics
- Maritime power
- Thalassocracy
- List of militaries by country
- List of armies by country
- List of aircraft carriers
- List of air forces
- List of space forces, units, and formations
- List of gendarmeries
- List of submarine classes in service
- List of naval ship classes in service
- Navies of landlocked countries
- List of countries by level of military equipment
