= Radio Güven =

Radios station in Cyprus

Radio Güven Radyo Güven
- Nicosia; Northern Cyprus
- Frequencies: 89.2, 90.4 and 90.8 MHz

Programming
- Languages: Turkish, with emergency broadcasts also in English and Greek
- Format: News/Talk, Full-service
- Affiliations: Security Forces Command (GKK)

History
- First air date: 1 August 2002

Links
- Website: radyoguven.gov.ct.tr

Radio Güven , or Radyo Güven, is an FM radio station in Northern Cyprus operated by the Security Forces Command (GKK). The station began broadcasting on 1 August 2002 and broadcasts on 89.2, 90.4 and 90.8 FM.

The station broadcasts via 5-kilowatt transmitters located at Selvili Tepe, Kantara and Atak Tepe, providing coverage across Northern Cyprus and reaching nearby areas.

In 2017, Radio Güven was selected as the best radio station in Northern Cyprus at the KKTC–Turkey "Yılın En İyileri" awards.
