= Commander of Security Forces Command =

The Commander of Security Forces Command (Turkish: Güvenlik Kuvvetleri komutanları) is the highest-ranking military officer of the Security Forces Command of the Turkish Republic of Cyprus. The current commander is Major General İlker Görgülü.

== List of commanders ==
No.	Name	Beginning	Finish
1	Brigadier General Hayri Ündül	September 10, 1976	August 29, 1978
2	Major General Atilla Erdogan	August 26, 1978	August 21, 1980
3	Brigadier General Kemal Yavuz	August 21, 1980	August 24, 1982
4	Brigadier General Hikmet Köksal	August 24, 1982	August 22, 1984
5	Brigadier General Yusuf Selçuk Saka	August 22, 1984	August 14, 1986
6	Brigadier General Bilgi Büyükünal	August 14, 1986	August 20, 1988
7	Brigadier General Ali Yalçın	August 20, 1988	August 17, 1990
8	Brigadier General Erdoğan Dirik	August 17, 1990	August 17, 1992
9	Brigadier General Yaşar Spor	August 17, 1992	August 19, 1994
10	Brigadier General Ismail Koçman	August 19, 1994	August 25, 1996
11	Brigadier General Hasan Peker Günal	August 25, 1996	August 21, 1998
12	Brigadier General Ali Nihat Özeyranlı	August 21, 1998	August 17, 2000
13	Brigadier General Galip Mendi	August 17, 2000	August 16, 2002
14	Brigadier General Necmettin Baykul	August 17, 2002	August 18, 2004
15	Major General Tevfik Özkılıç	August 18, 2004	August 9, 2006
16	Major General Mehmet Eröz	August 9, 2006	August 19, 2008
17	Major General Abdullah Recep	August 19, 2008	August 17, 2010
18	Major General Mehmet Daysal	August 17, 2010	August 10, 2012
19	Major General Baki Kavun	August 10, 2012	August 10, 2014
20	Major General Ilyas Bozkurt	August 10, 2014	August 10, 2015
21	Major General Erhan Uzun	August 10, 2015	August 10, 2016
22	Major General Yılmaz Yıldırım	August 10, 2016	August 10, 2017
23	Brigadier General Tevfik Algan	August 19, 2017	August 22, 2019
24	Brigadier General Altan Er	August 22, 2019	August 4, 2020
25	Major General Zorlu Topaloğlu	August 4, 2020	August 10, 2023
26	Major General Osman Aytac	August 10, 2023	August 9, 2024
27	Major General İlker Görgülü	August 9, 2024	Present

== List of deputy commanders ==
No.	Name	Beginning	Finish
1	Brigadier General Salih Cengaver Cem	August 30, 2005	August 30, 2008
2	Brigadier General Mehmet Soganci	August 30, 2010	August 23, 2013
3	Brigadier General Erdinç Korkuter	August 30, 2013	August 10, 2016
4	Brigadier General Cemal Volkan	August 30, 2016	August 30, 2019
5	Brigadier General Ibrahim Dagman	August 30, 2019	August 30, 2021
5	Brigadier General Kadir Bayraklı	August 30, 2021	August 30, 2024
6	Brigadier General Mehmet Ali Akbaş	August 30, 2024	On duty
