= Space Directorate =

- Hebrew: מנהלת החלל
- Active: February 2024
- Country: Israel
- Branch: Israeli Air Force
- Role: Space warfare

The Space Directorate (Hebrew: מנהלת החלל) is the space warfare unit of the Israel Defense Forces established in February 2024. The Directorate is administered by the Israeli Air Force.

== See also ==
- List of space forces, units, and formations
- Israel Space Agency
