= Aviation Unit Command =

Turkish military unit

- Havacılık Birlik Komutanlığı
- Founded: 1976
- Headquarters: Boğaz, Girne
- Website: www.mucahit.gov.ct.tr

Industry
- Foreign suppliers: Turkey

Related articles
- History: Turkish Resistance Organisation (TMT)

The Aviation Unit Command (Turkish: Havacılık Birlik Komutanlığı) is responsible for defending the Turkish Republic of Northern Cyprus in the land borders, territorial waters and airspace, as well as the international sea and airspace of the Eastern Mediterranean, and to carry out search and rescue missions in these regions. It is part of the Security Forces Command.
