= South African Space Command Section =

The South African Space Command Section (SASCS) is a space command of the South African Air Force. The establishment of the SASCS was announced in September 2022 by Lieutenant General Wiseman Mbambo at the Air and Space Power Symposium. The SASCS was announced to help manage and coordinate all defence-related space activities in collaboration with the South African National Space Agency (SANSA) and other government agencies. Following the announcement, a Space Command Integrated Planning Team (SCIPT) was established to help launch the command section, which was coordinated with the National Earth Observation Space Secretariat (NEOSS), SANSA, the Department of Science and Innovation (DSI) and the Council for Scientific and Industrial Research (CSIR). The SCIPT also collaborated with the Space Operations Command of the Italian Armed Forces. The command section was formally launched on 17 September 2024, with Major General Lancelot Mathebula announced as the first leader of the command section.
