= Security Forces Command =

Military and security force of Northern Cyprus

- Güvenlik Kuvvetleri Komutanlığı
- Coat of arms of the Security Forces Command
- Motto: "Always and Everywhere" (Turkish: "Her Zaman ve Her Yerde")
- Founded: 1 August 1976 (as successor to TMT, active since 1958)
- Service branches: Aviation Unit Command; Coastal Guard Command; Directorate General for Police
- Headquarters: Boğaz, Girne
- Website: www.mucahit.gov.ct.tr

Leadership
- Commander: Major Gen. İlker Görgülü

Personnel
- Military age: 18
- Conscription: 8 to 15 months
- Active personnel: ~15,000 (including conscripts)
- Reserve personnel: ~26,000

Industry
- Foreign suppliers: Turkey (primary supplier)

Related articles
- History: Turkish Resistance Organisation (TMT)

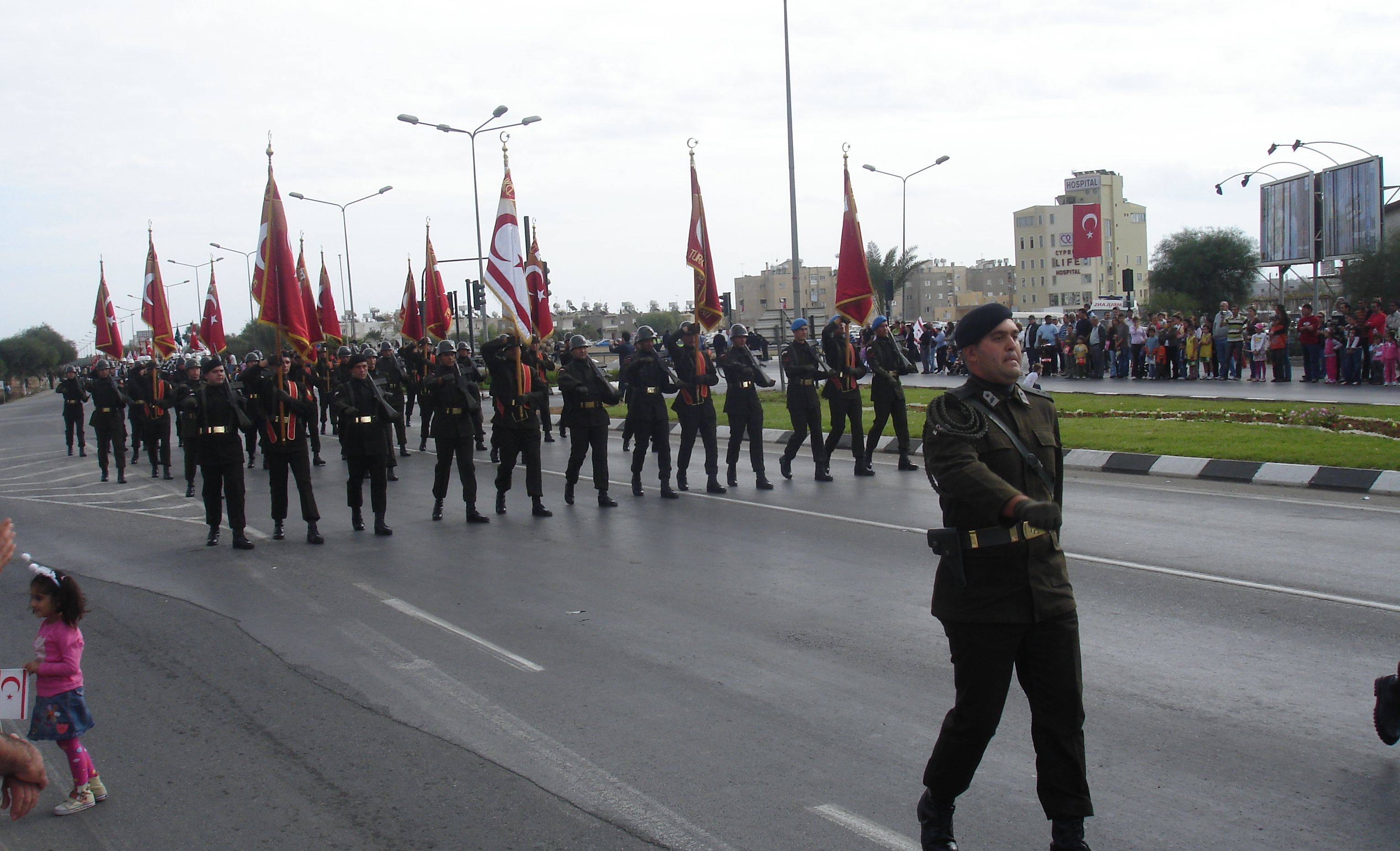
Turkish Cypriot soldiers of the Security Forces Command perform during the 2007 Republic Day parade.

The Security Forces Command (Turkish: Güvenlik Kuvvetleri Komutanlığı, GKK) is the military and security force of the Turkish Republic of Northern Cyprus (TRNC), a de facto state recognized only by Turkey.

It is a 15,000 strong force primarily made up of conscripted Turkish Cypriot males between the ages of 18 and 40. It is a combined arms force, with land, air and naval arms, plus police and fire elements.

This force is supplemented by the 17,500–30,000 strong Turkish military forces in Northern Cyprus stationed on the island.

== History ==
The Republic of Cyprus' constitution provided for a bi-communal army (i.e. Greek Cypriot and Turkish Cypriot) on a 60/40 per cent basis. The Cyprus army composed by both main Cypriot ethnic groups was created in 1960 yet was dismantled in the scope of the interethnic conflict 1963-4. Since then, both communities have maintained their independent armed forces. Even before independence, the Turkish Cypriot community (and similarly the Greek Cypriot community) maintained its own paramilitary force (the Türk Mukavemet Teşkilatı or TMT), trained and equipped by the Turkish Army (ibid). In 1967 this force was renamed the Mücahit ("Mujahideen"), and in 1975 the Mücahit was renamed the Turkish Cypriot Security Force. In 1974, Turkey led an invasion of Cyprus with the aim of protecting the Turkish minority population after a Greek-inspired coup brought a threat of union of the island with Greece. Since then there have been no major fighting in Cyprus and the island continues to be divided.

== Organization ==
The Turkish Cypriot Security Force is under the command of an officer of the Turkish Army. The officer is appointed by the Turkish Armed Forces and holds the rank of major general, whereas the head of the Turkish military forces in Northern Cyprus holds a higher rank as lieutenant general. According to observers a large part of its budget was covered by the Turkish army, upon which it depended for training and equipment. It is also believed that the majority of its officers came from the ranks of the Turkish Army officer corps on temporary leave from their regular duties and its operations were controlled by the Turkish army.

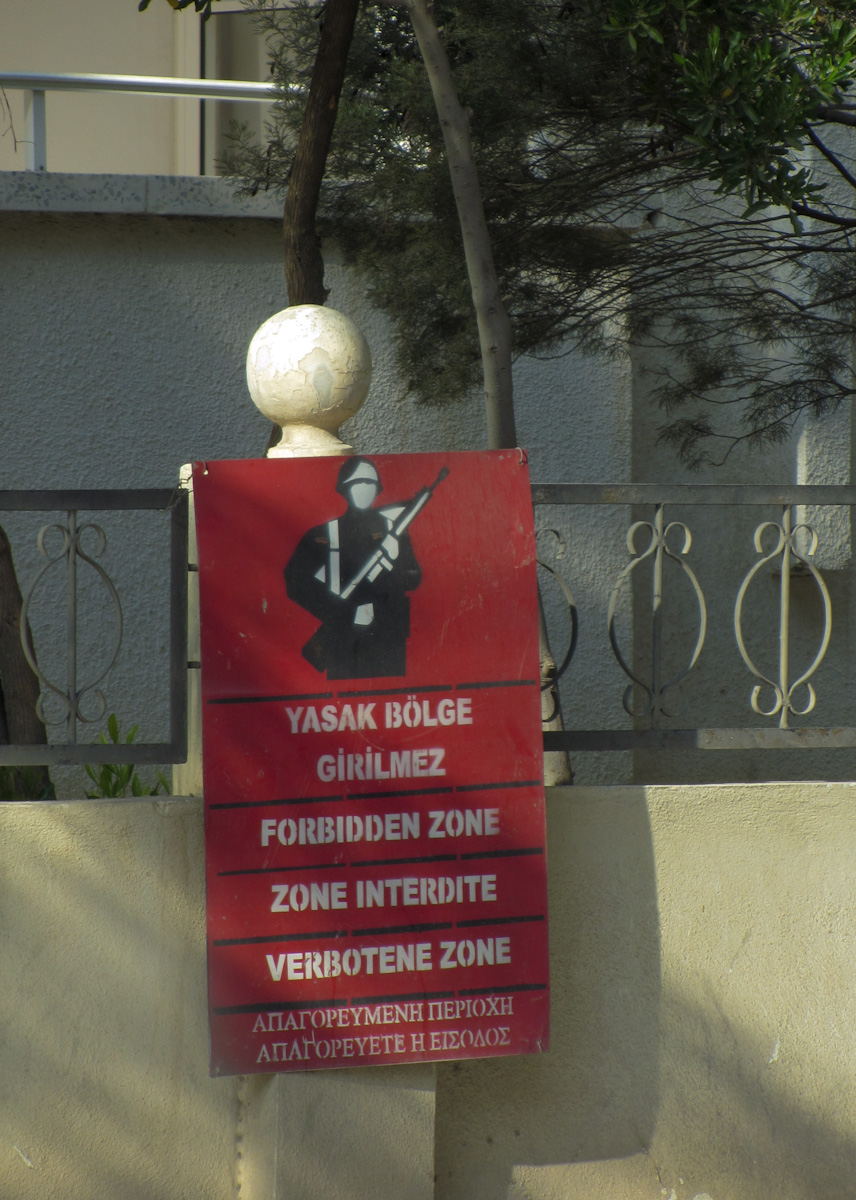
A restricted military zone warning sign installed by the Security Forces Command (GKK) in Northern Cyprus. The sign prohibits entry and photography in Turkish, Greek, and English.

=== Structure ===
It includes 4 Infantry Regiments, one artillery battalion, Special Task Force Command and the Coast Guard Command, two regiments of which are expedition and the other two are mobile. In addition, the TRNC Police Organization is included in the Security Forces. The organization is as follows:

Combatant commands: 1st Infantry Regiment, Girne & Lefka; 2nd Infantry Regiment - (reserve) , Güzelyurt; 3rd Infantry Regiment - (reserve) , Myrtou; 4th Infantry Regiment, Gazimağusa; Artillery Battalion; Erenköy Defence Detachment	Support commands: TRNC Aviation & CSAR Unit Command; Logistics Support Command; Special Task Force Command, ÖGKK; Air Defence & UAV command, Incekum & Geçitkale Air Base; CBRN Defence & Security Command; Directorate General for Police, includes the Fire and Rescue Service under security forces command.; Police Special Operation Department TRNC PGM; Central Prison Garrison & Prison Officer Command; TRNC Coast Guard Command; GKK Band Team	Headquarters service units: Main Branch & Mobilization Branch Directorate; Personnel Command; Intelligence Command; Operations Command; General Planning & Principles Command; Communications & IT Command; Press Office & Radyo Güven; TRNC Police School Directorate

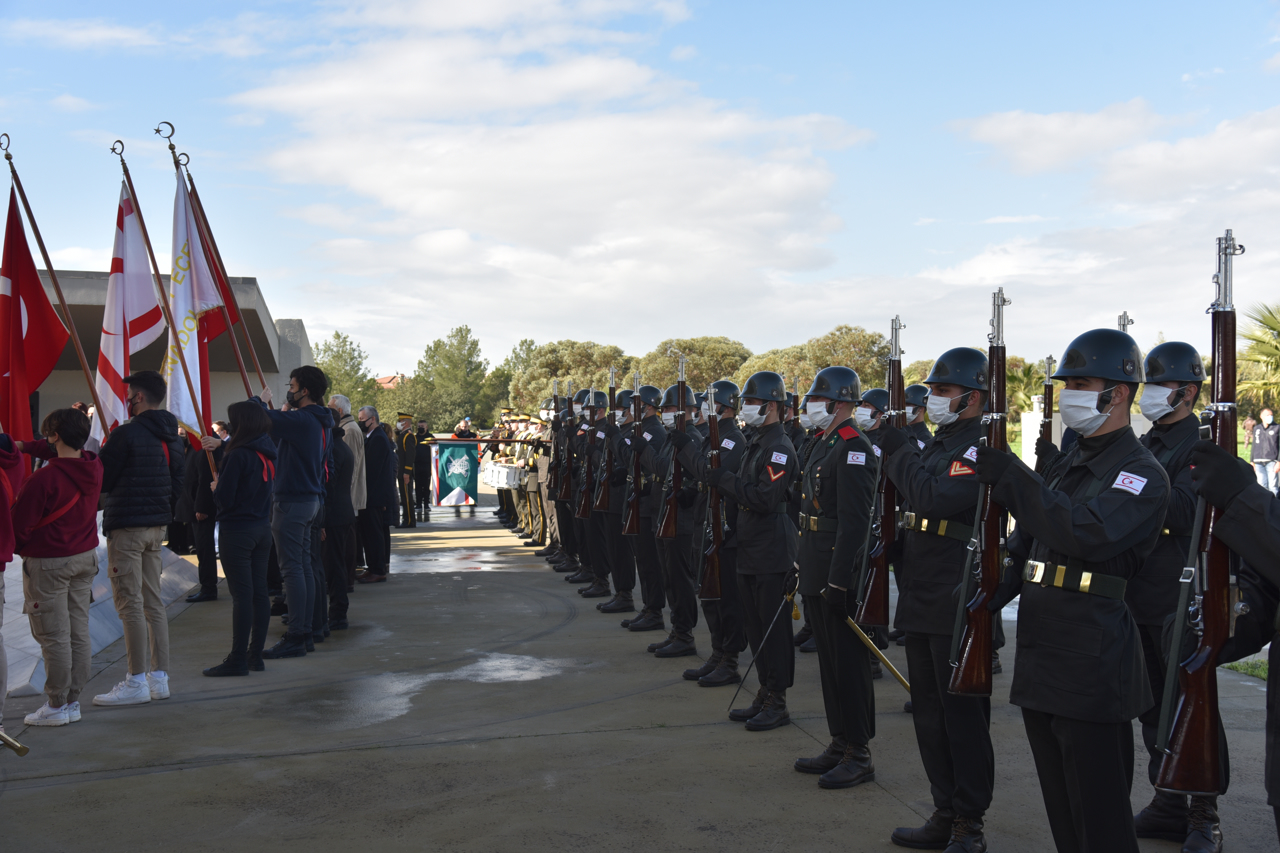
Turkish Cypriot Soldiers.

== Media and Public Relations ==
The Security Forces Command operates its own institutional public media networks to maintain communication, broadcast official defense announcements, and provide cultural programming to the Turkish Cypriot community. These media operations are structurally managed under the command's press and public relations branches:

- Radio Güven (Radyo Güven): Established on 1 August 2002, it serves as the official radio broadcasting station of the command. Operating via 5-kilowatt transmitters at Selvili Tepe, Kantara, and Atak Tepe, the station provides wide coverage across Cyprus and the southern coasts of Turkey. It broadcasts news, public interest programs, and military recruitment announcements.
- Güven TV: The television broadcasting division of the command, which focuses on producing documentaries regarding military history, regional security updates, and national ceremonies in Northern Cyprus.

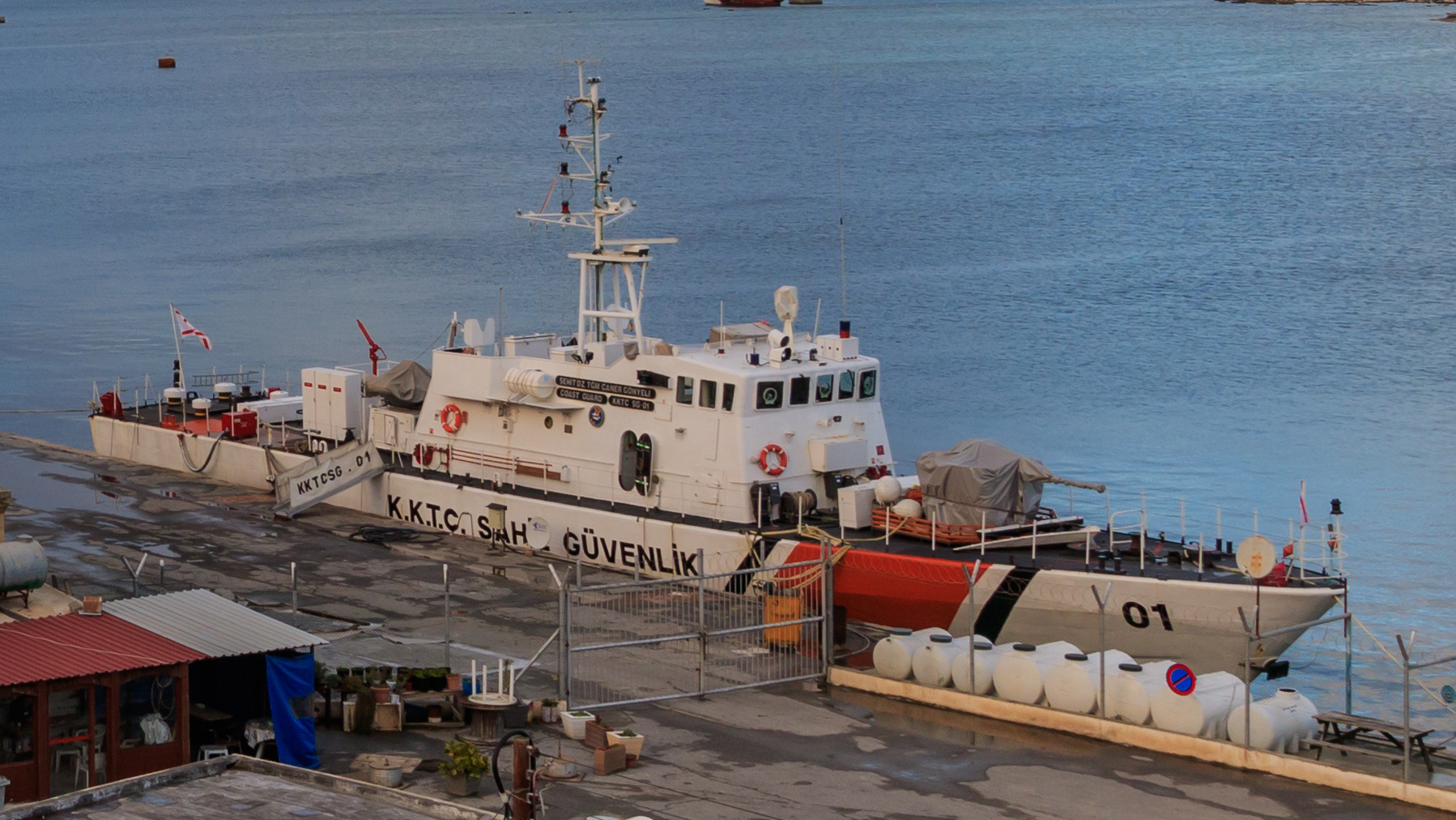
80 class KKTCSG-01 at the Port of Famagusta

== Strength ==
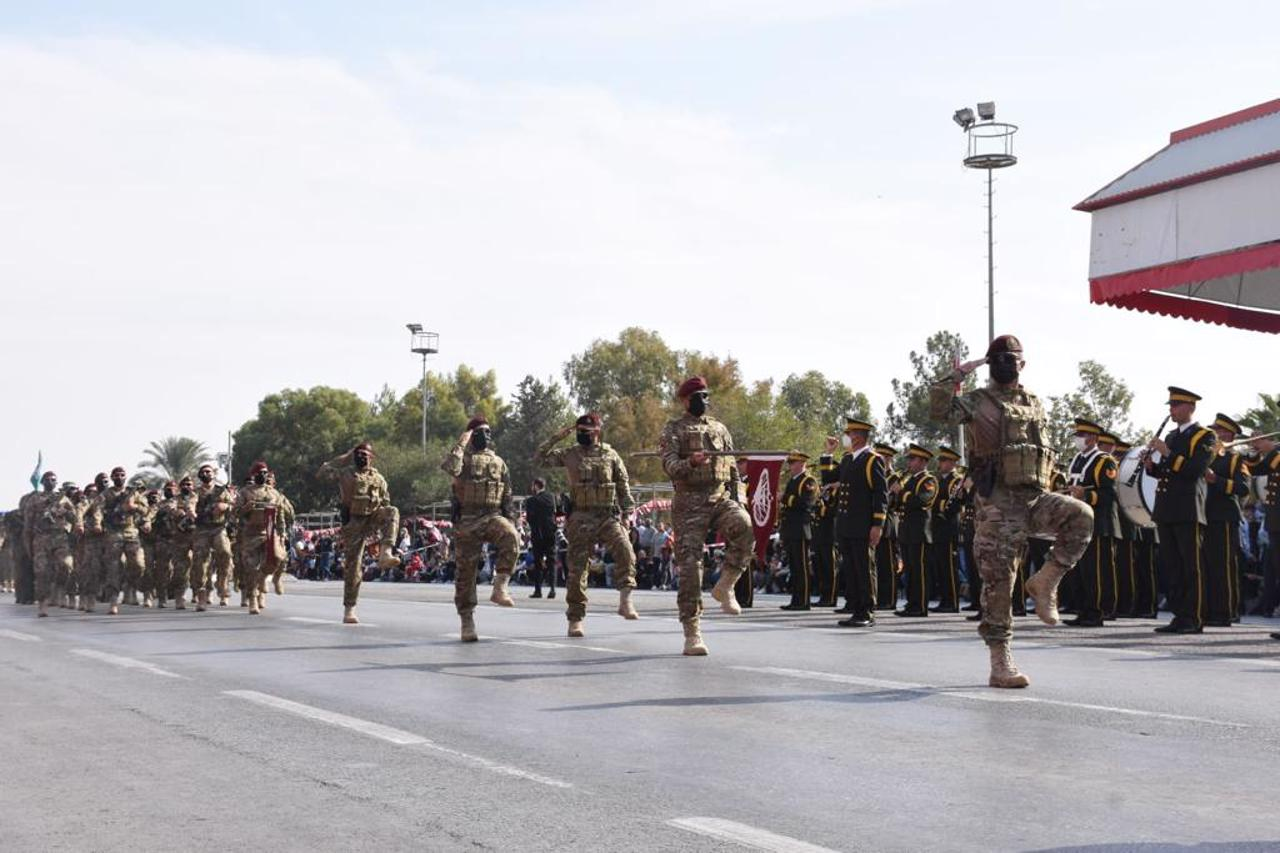
ÖGKK Commandos Passage Ceremony.

As of 2009, the strength of this force was believed to be about 9,000. It was organized into fifteen battalions in two brigades, infantry battalions armed with light weapons plus some artillery units equipped with mortars, ATGM's and MANPADS

Turkish Cyprus's Coast Guard has 36 vessels. The flagship fleet of the command consists of four main vessels of the Turkish Coast Guard Type 80 class (such as KKTC SG-01), which were constructed between 1997 and 2000 and have been in active service since 2000. In terms of armament, these vessels are equipped with one 40mm/70 caliber gun and two 12.7mm machine guns. The rest of the naval inventory is composed of fast attack crafts, rapid intervention boats, and dedicated search and rescue (SAR) vessels.

In March, 2023, Turkish Cyprus's Coast Guard started to operate TRNC SG-110 (BOĞAZ), TRNC SG-111 (LEFKE) and TRNC SG-112 (SERDARLI) modern assault boats.

== Equipment ==
The Security Forces Command (GKK) and its structurally attached division, the Police General Directorate (PGM), primarily utilize military hardware, small arms, and tactical vehicles supplied by or produced in cooperation with the Turkish Armed Forces (TSK).

=== Pistols ===
Name	Image	Type	Origin	Notes
Yavuz 16		Semi-automatic pistol	Italy Turkey	Standard issue sidearm for military personnel and regular police officers. Produced by GİRSAN/MKE based on the Beretta 92 platform.
Sarsılmaz SAR 9		Semi-automatic pistol	Germany Turkey	Modern striker-fired polymer pistol, adopted as a next-generation standard sidearm for officers and frontline tactical units.
Canik TP9		Semi-automatic pistol	Germany Turkey	Widely deployed by the Police General Directorate (PGM) Special Operations (Özel Harekat) and VIP protection details.

=== Small Arms ===
Name	Image	Type	Origin	Notes
Heckler & Koch G3		Battle rifle	Turkey / Germany	G3 Standard service rifle for conscripts. Manufactured by Makine ve Kimya Endüstrisi (MKE). G3A7 and G3A7A1 variants in use. some fitted MKE T-40
MKE MPT		Assault rifle	Germany Turkey	Modern service rifle utilized by professional personnel and officers. 76 and 55 variants in use. Also some marksman rifle variants.
KCR-556		Assault rifle	Turkey	Modern 5.56mm assault rifle employed by specialized units and commando groups.
HK33A4		Assault rifle	West Germany Turkey / Germany	Produced under license by MKE; used by frontline operational units.
MP5		Submachine gun	West Germany Turkey / Germany	Standard submachine gun for police tactical units (Özel Harekat) and VIP security details. MP5A2, MP5A3, MP5SD3 and MP5K variants are in use.
MG3		General-purpose machine gun	West Germany Turkey / Germany	Standard squad-level automatic weapon, produced under license by MKE.
FN Minimi		Light machine gun	Belgium	Utilized by special forces units (CSAR) for high-mobility squad fire support.

=== Heavy Weapons and Guided Missiles ===
Name	Image	Type	Origin	Notes
MILAN		Anti-tank guided missile	France / West Germany / Germany	Main wire-guided anti-armor defense system deployed by infantry battalions.
RPG-7		Rocket-propelled grenade	Soviet Union	Standard shoulder-fired anti-tank rocket launcher. Some PSRL-1 variants in use by SF units.
M72 LAW		Anti-tank weapon	United States / Turkey	Light, disposable anti-tank rocket launcher used for immediate armor defense. HAR66 variant in use.
MKE Mortars		Mortar	Turkey	60mm commando, 81mm,HY-12 and 120mm caliber variants manufactured by MKE for indirect infantry fire support.
FIM-92 Stinger		MANPADS	United States / Turkey	Man-portable low-altitude air defense system, partially produced under license in Turkey by ROKETSAN.
AGS-17		Automatic grenade launcher	Soviet Union / East Germany	30mm automatic grenade launcher mounted on Otokar Akrep armored vehicles, utilized by infantry battalions for heavy, rapid fire support.

=== Vehicles and Aviation ===
Name	Image	Type	Origin	Notes
Otokar Land Rover		Tactical vehicle	Turkey / United Kingdom	Built under license by Otokar. Widely used for border patrols, internal security, and command roles. Also some Engerek variants in use.
Mercedes Unimog		Military truck	Turkey / West Germany	Produced by Mercedes-Benz Türk.
BMC Tactical Trucks		Military truck	Turkey	Heavy logistical trucks (such as BMC 185-09/245-16) used for troop movement and supply transport.
BMC Vuran / BMC Amazon		MRAP / Armored personnel carrier	Turkey	Mine-resistant armored vehicles deployed by tactical military units and the Police General Directorate (PGM) Special Operations (Özel Harekat) for internal security operations.
Otokar Cobra & Akrep		Infantry mobility vehicle	Turkey	Light armored vehicle used for reconnaissance, rapid response, and tactical police support. I & II variant in use.
AS532 Cougar		Utility helicopter	France; European Union / Turkey	Operated for tactical transport, search and rescue (CSAR), and medical evacuation, integrated within the GKK aviation wing in coordination with the Turkish Army KTBK command.

== Military ranks of Turkish Republic of Northern Cyprus ==
The Security Forces Command is structurally a division-sized formation comprising approximately 15,000 active personnel. Since the Turkish Republic of Northern Cyprus does not possess its own independent military academy (Harbiye), its officer corps is trained in Turkey at the Turkish Military Academy. Consequently, the commander of the force traditionally holding the rank of Major General along with other high-ranking commanders and generals, are appointed directly from the cadres of the Turkish Armed Forces (TSK).

In terms of military heraldry and uniform regulations, the rank insignia and design structure utilized by the Security Forces Command are historically modeled after the rank system used by the Turkish Armed Forces during the 1938–1947 period.

=== Commissioned officer ranks ===
The rank insignia of commissioned officers.

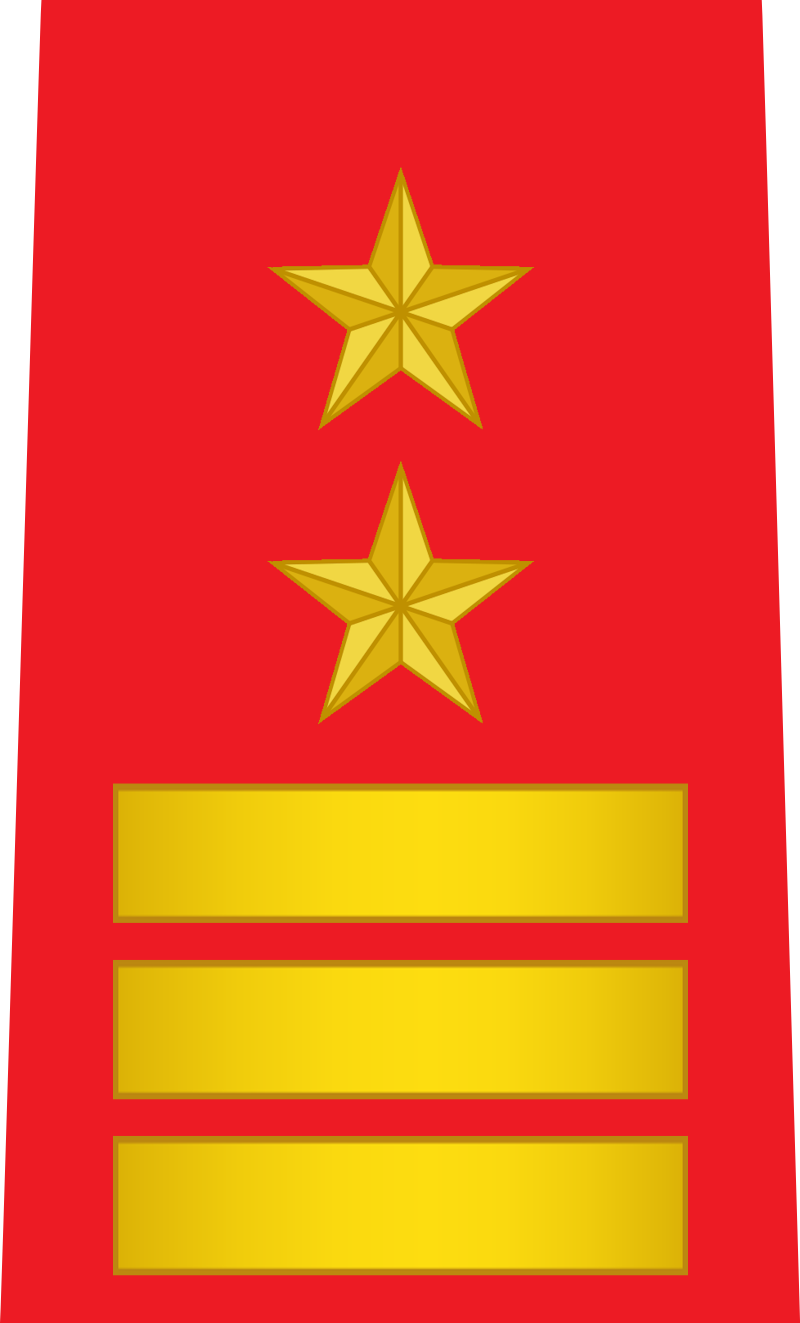
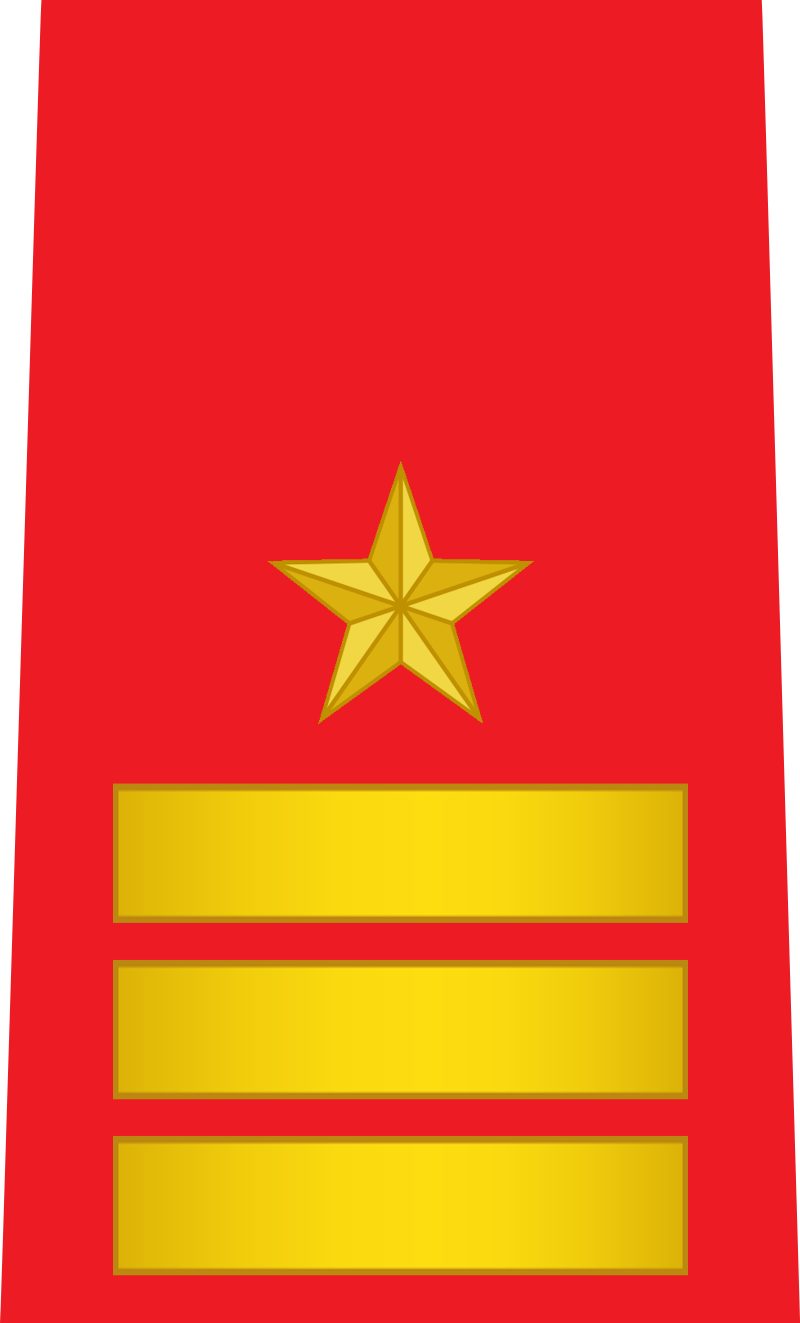
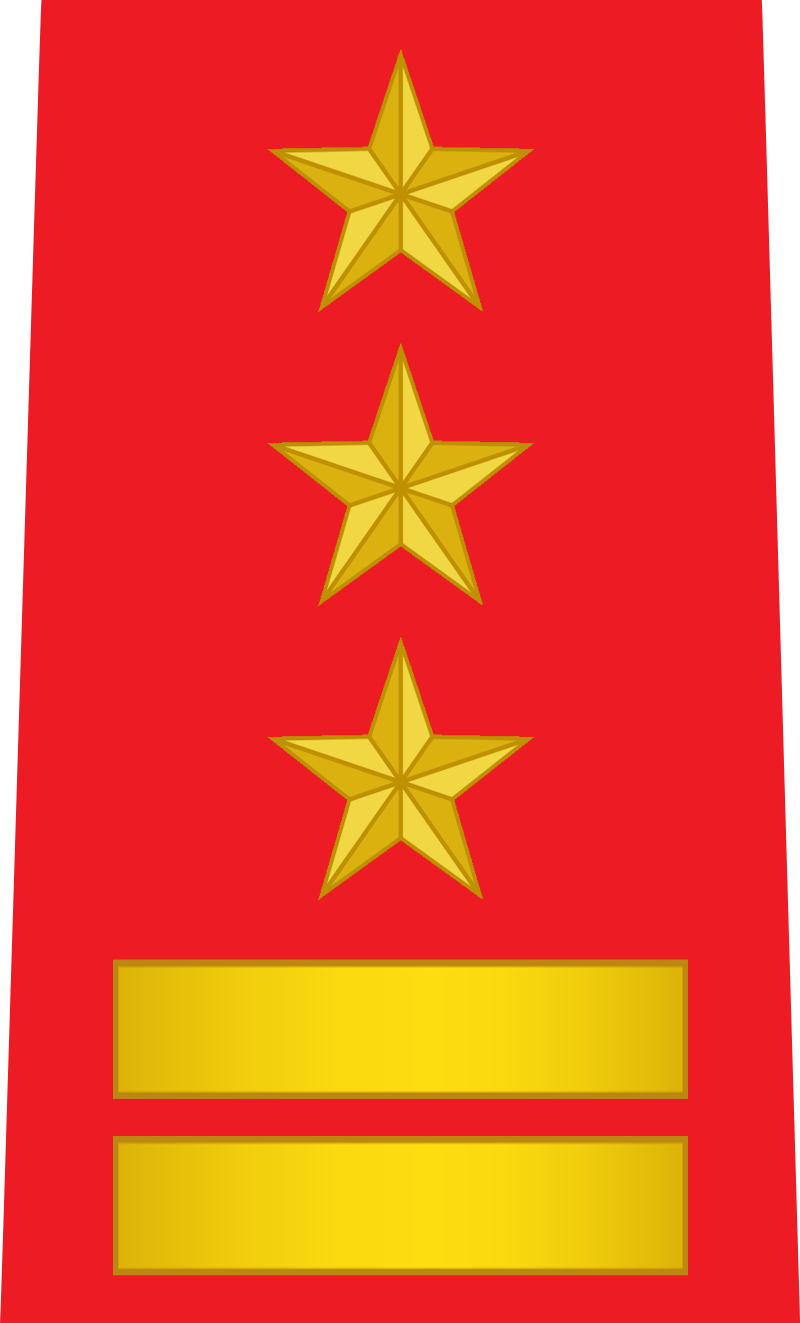
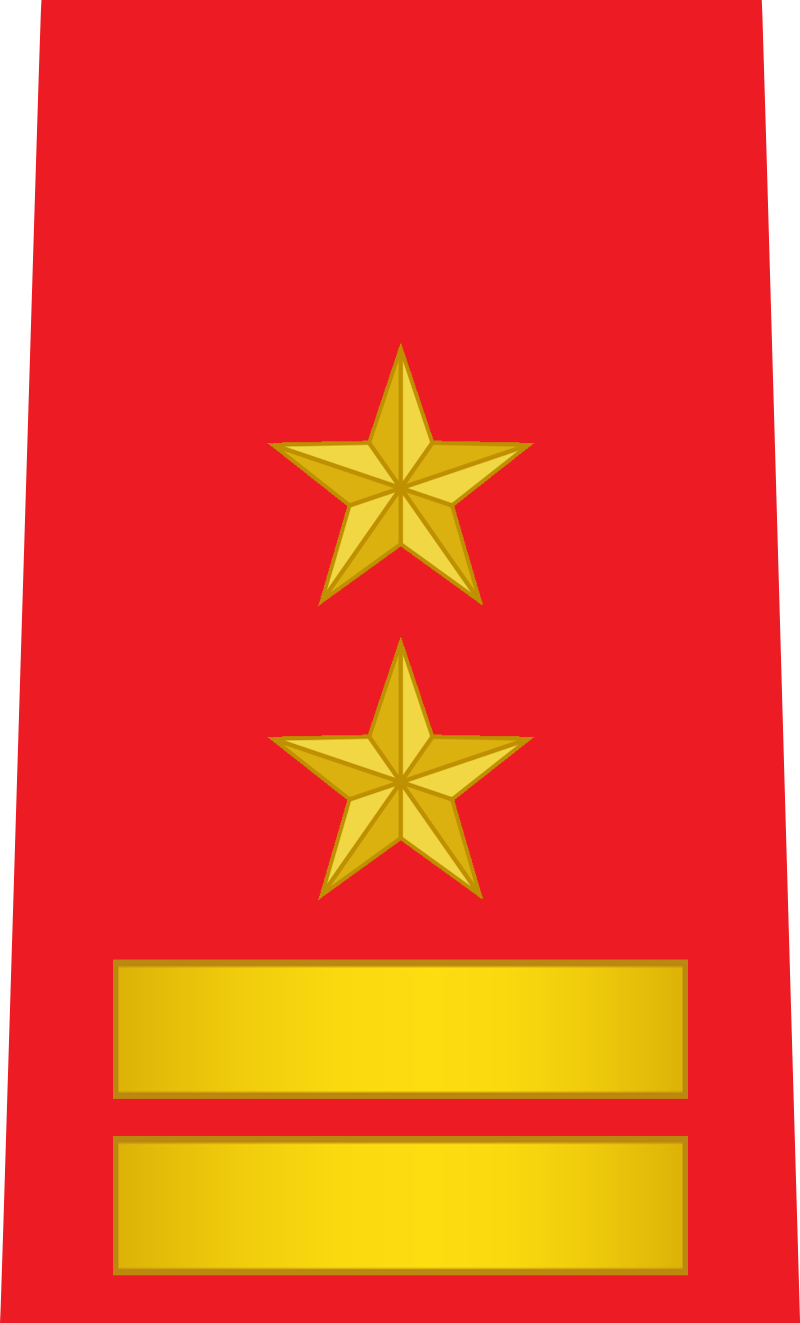
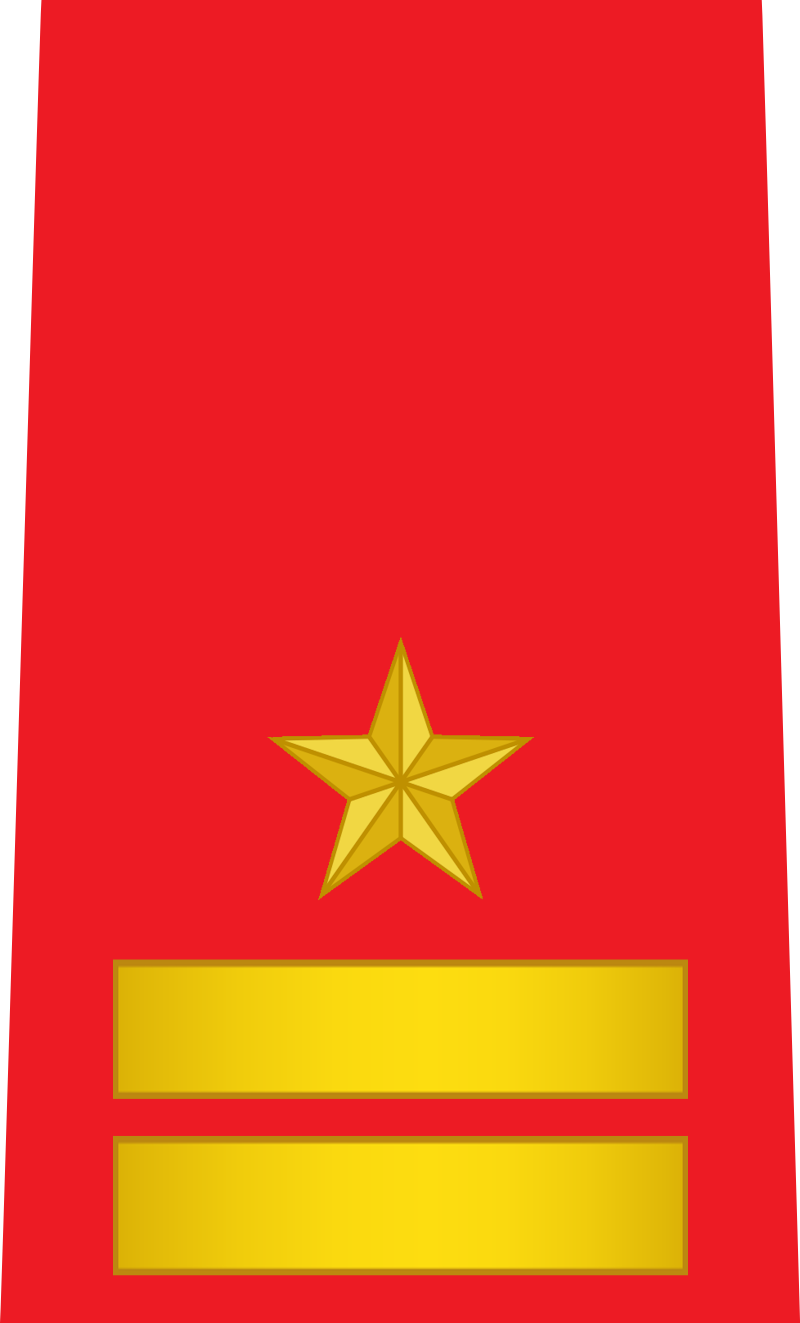
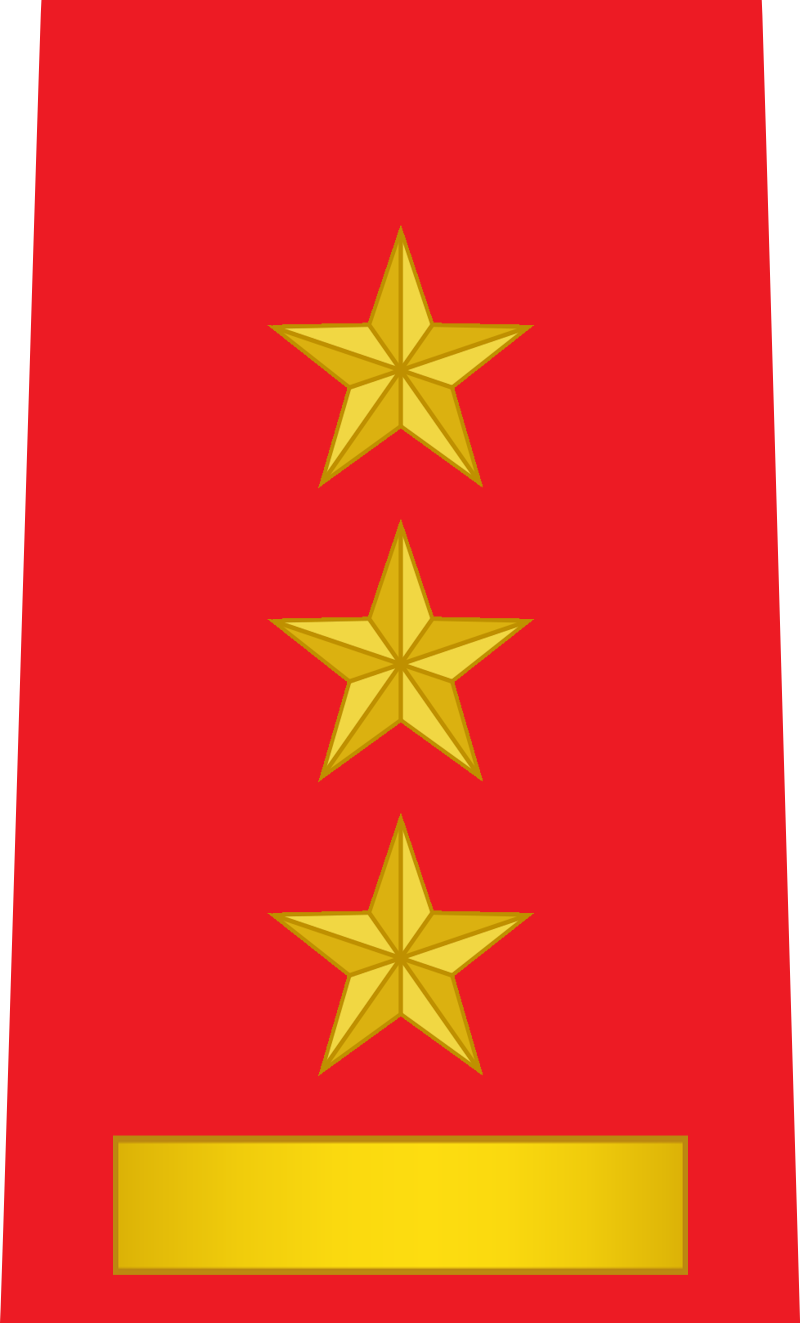
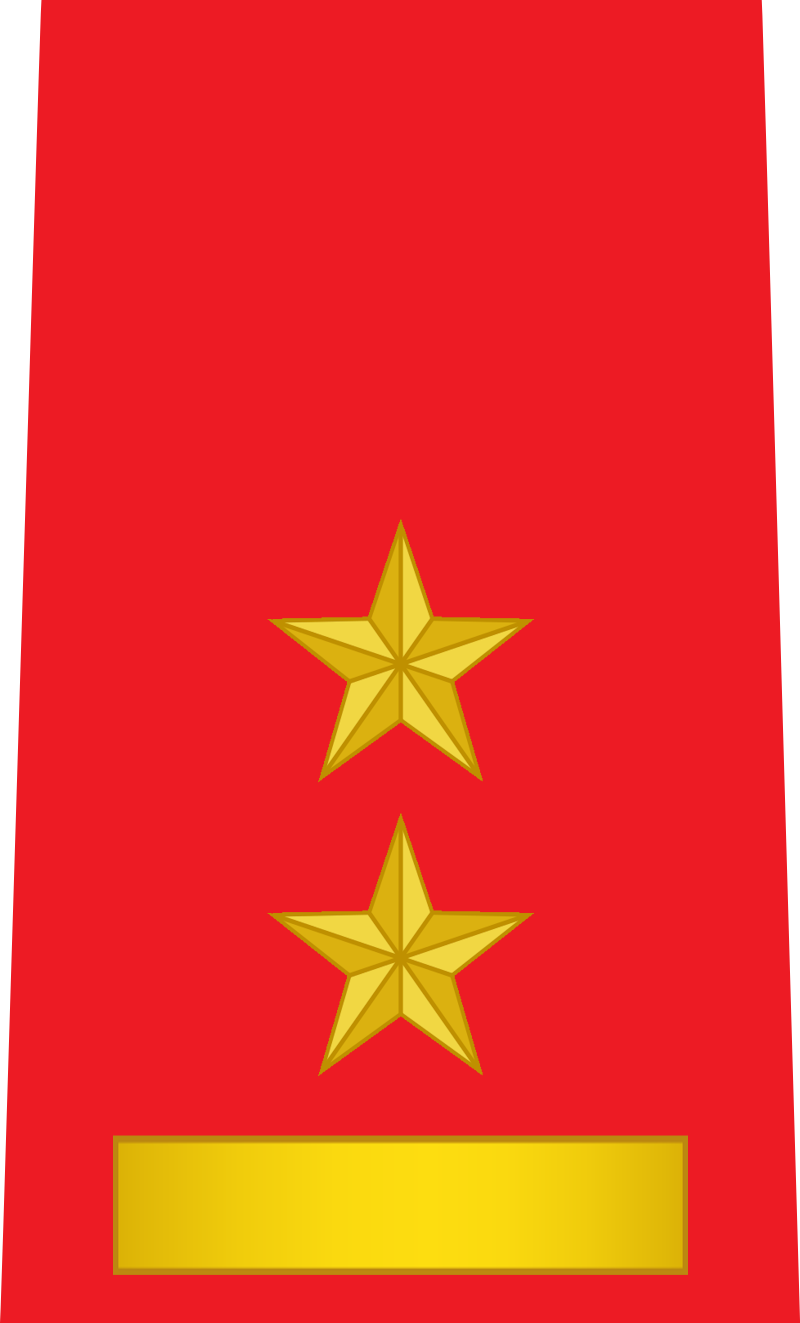
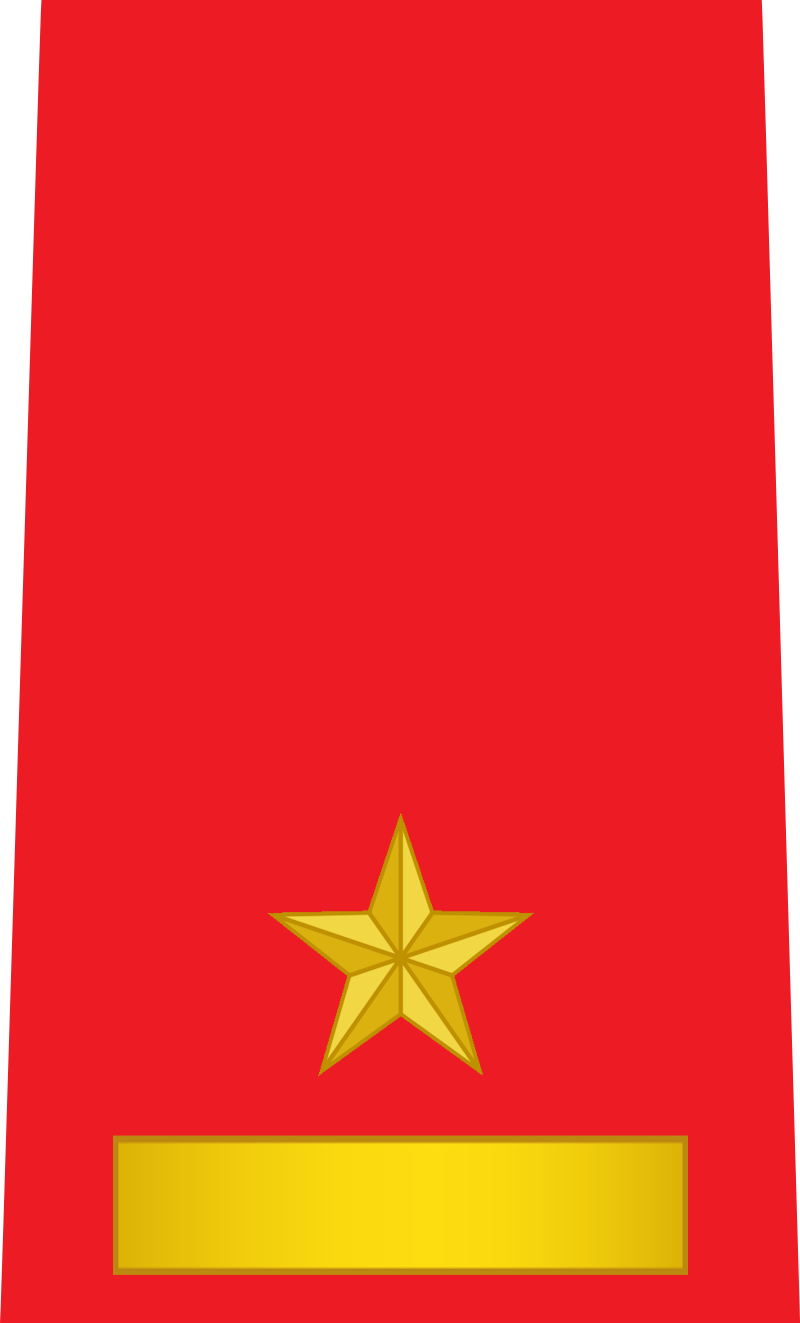
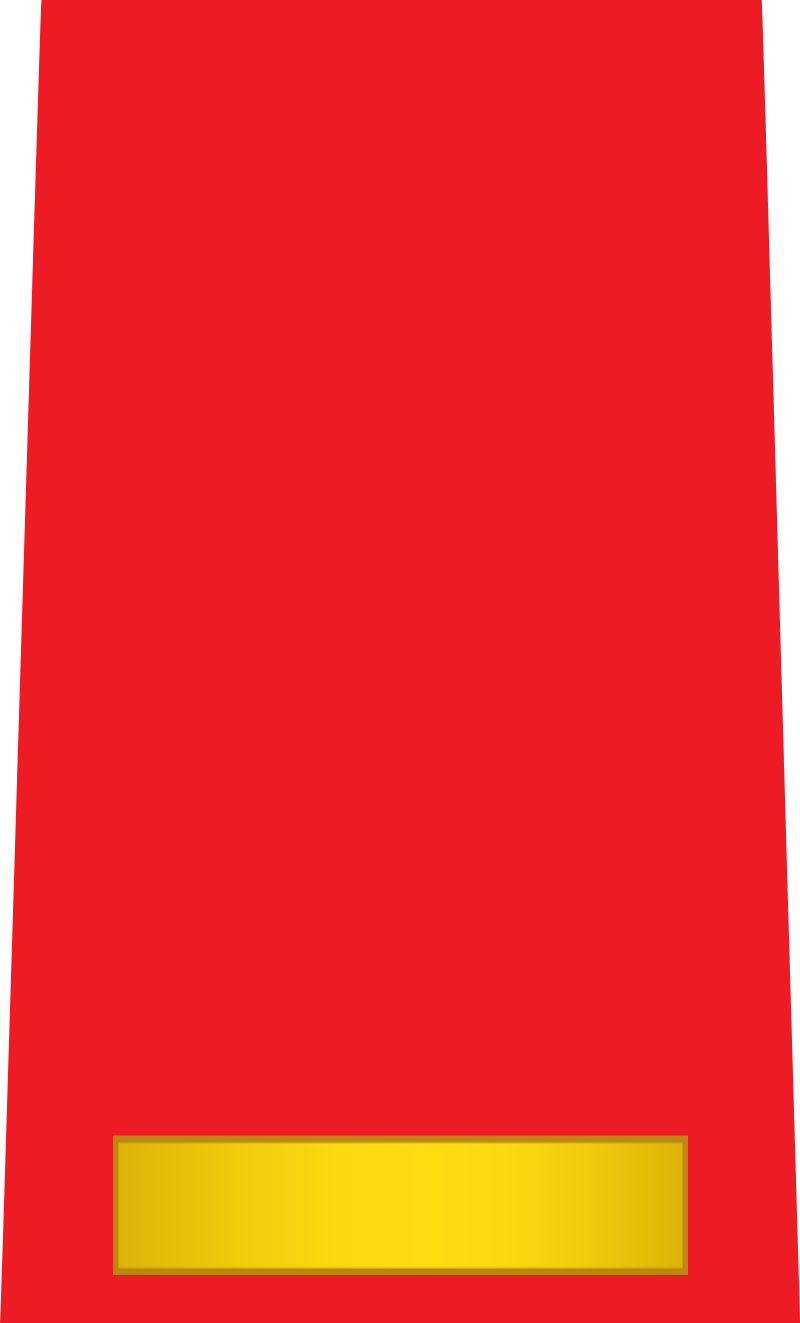
Rank group	General / flag officers		Senior officers			Junior officers
Northern Cypriot; Security Forces Command
Northern Cypriot; Security Forces Command	Tümgeneral (Major general)	Tuğgeneral (Brigadier general)	Albay (Colonel)	Yarbay (Lieutenant colonel)	Binbaşı (Major)	Yüzbaşı (Captain)	Üsteğmen (First lieutenant)	Teğmen (Second lieutenant)	Asteğmen (Sub-lieutenant)

=== Other ranks ===
The rank insignia of non-commissioned officers and enlisted personnel.

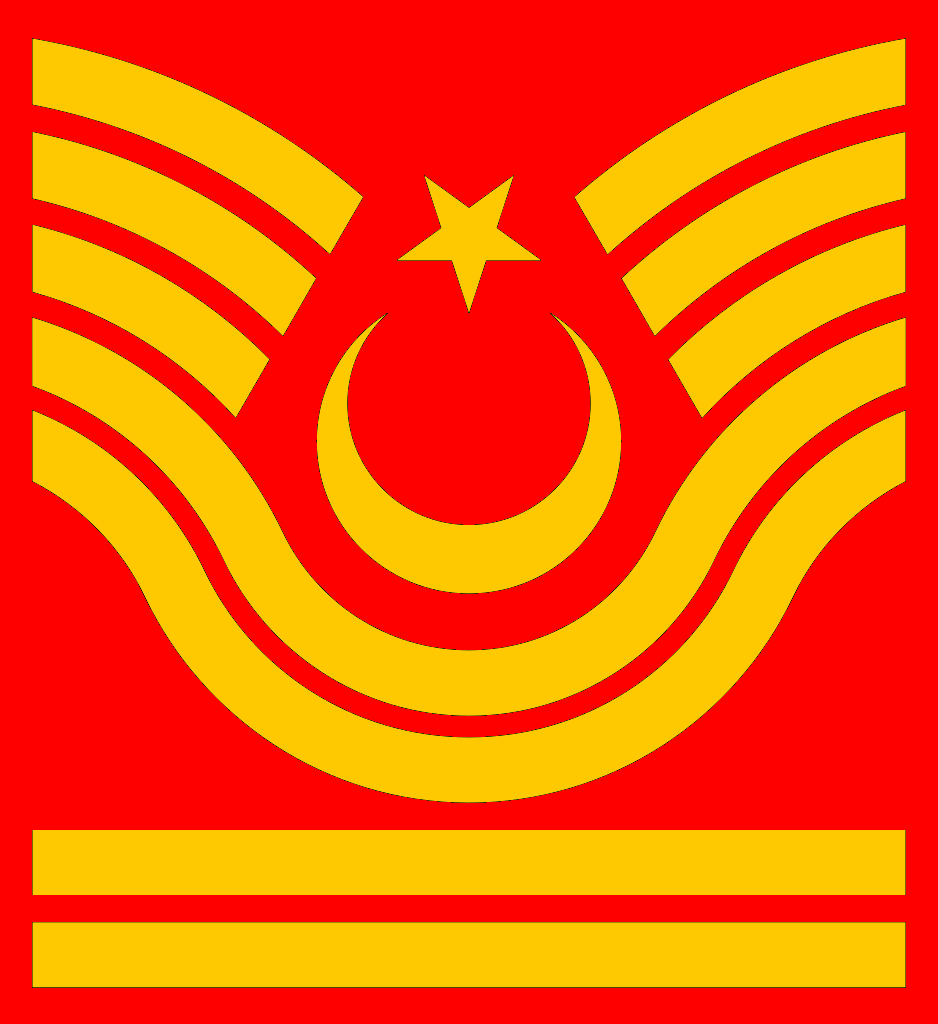
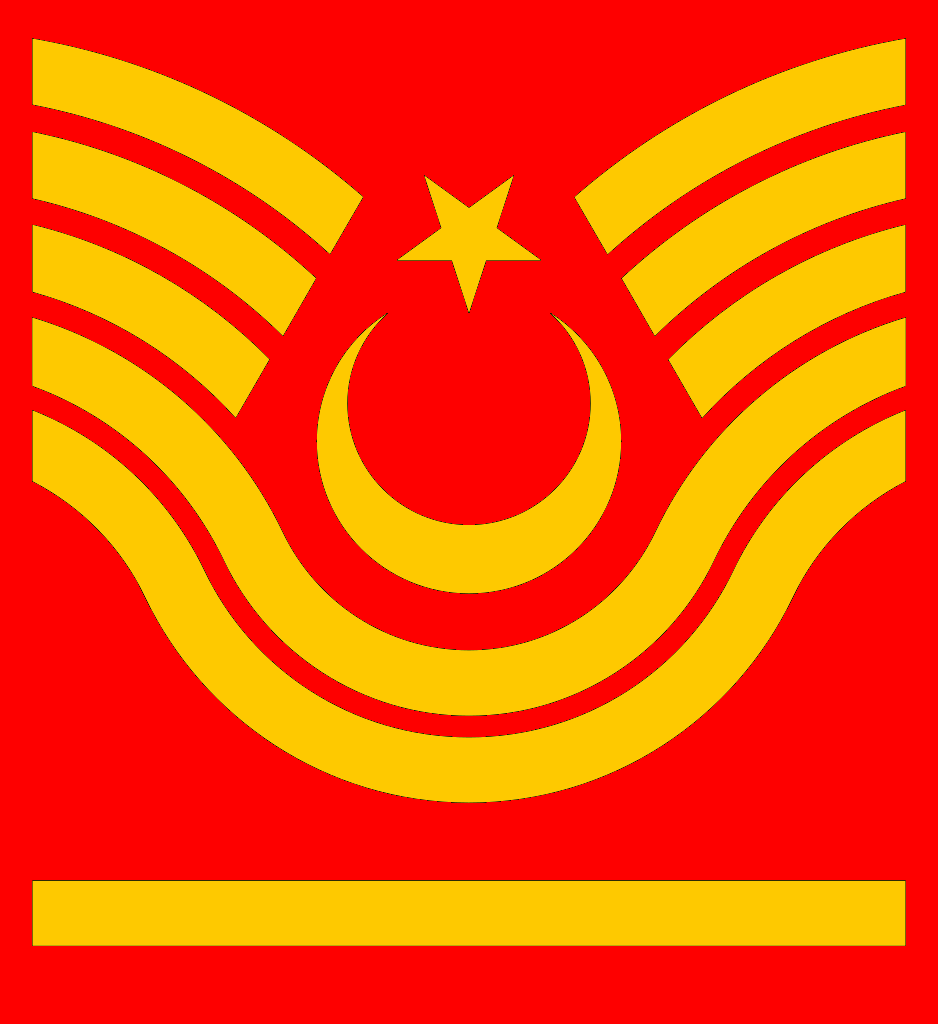
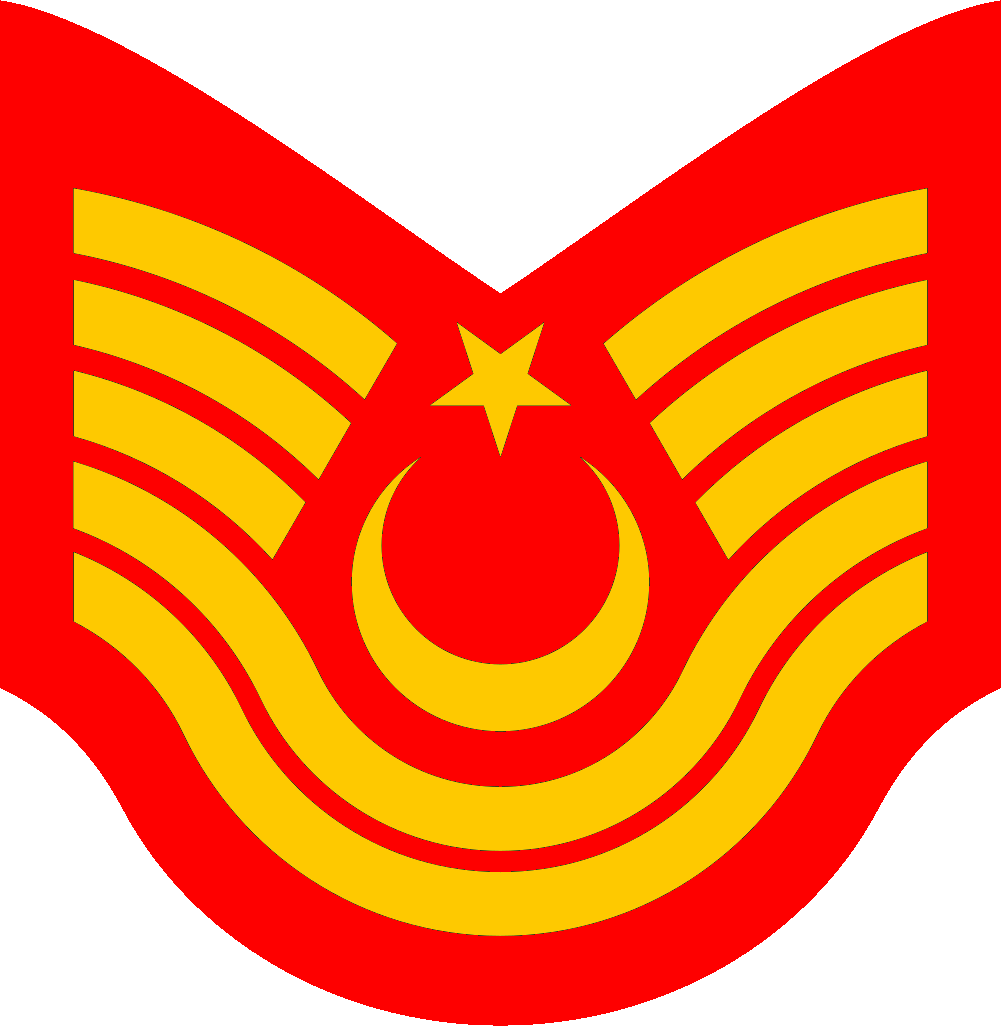
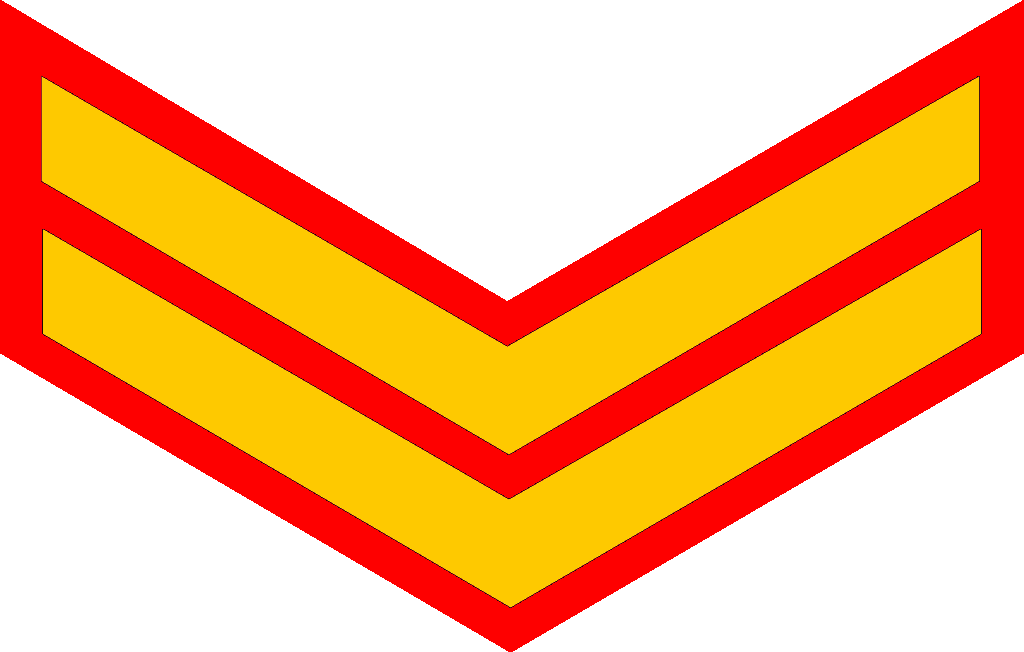
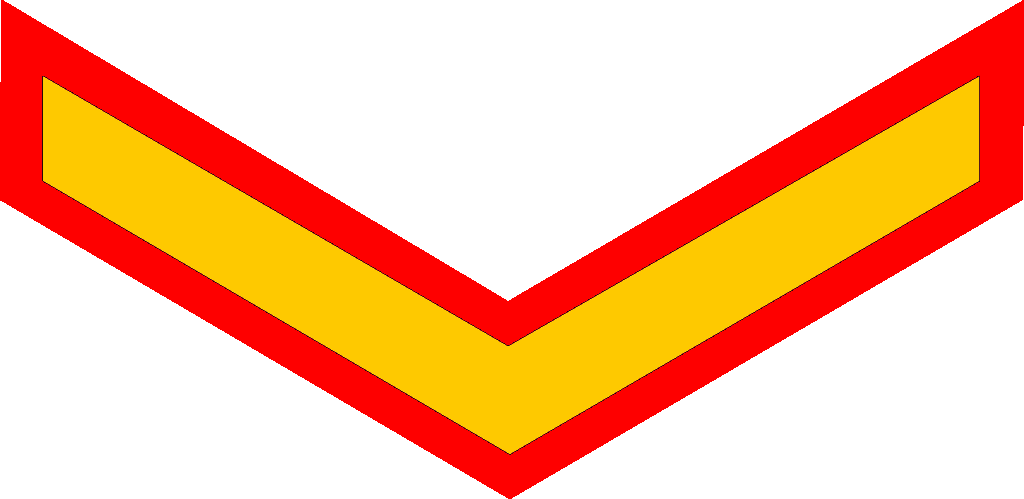
Rank group	Senior NCOs						Junior NCOs		Enlisted
Northern Cypriot; Security Forces Command									No insignia
Northern Cypriot; Security Forces Command	Astsubay kıdemli baş çavuş (Command sergeant major)	Astsubay baş çavuş (Sergeant major)	Astsubay kıdemli üst çavuş (Master sergeant)	Astsubay üst çavuş (Sergeant first class)	Astsubay kıdemli çavuş (Staff sergeant)	Astsubay çavuş (Sergeant)	Çavuş (Corporal)	Onbaşı (Lance corporal)	Er (Private)

== Compulsory military service ==
Military service is compulsory for all male citizens of the Turkish Republic of Northern Cyprus under the framework of the TRNC Military Law (Askerlik Yasası). Conscripts are generally called up for enlistment at the age of 18 or 19 after completing their secondary education.

The duration of compulsory service varies based on the conscript's educational qualifications:

- Standard conscripts (those without a higher education degree) typically fulfill a service period of 15 months.
- University graduates have the option to serve as reserve officers (Asteğmen) for 12 months, or complete a shortened service of 8 months as standard conscripts.

Special legal provisions exist for Turkish Cypriot citizens residing abroad. Under the paid military service (Bedelli askerlik) scheme, individuals who have lived and worked abroad for a legally specified duration can shorten their active service to a brief basic training period (typically a few weeks) by paying a designated exemption fee to the government. Conscientious objection is currently not legally recognized under TRNC law, and failure to report for duty is subject to judicial penalties.

== See also ==
- Cyprus Turkish Peace Force Command
- Cypriot National Guard
- Hellenic Force in Cyprus
- Directorate General for Police
