= Port of Famagusta =

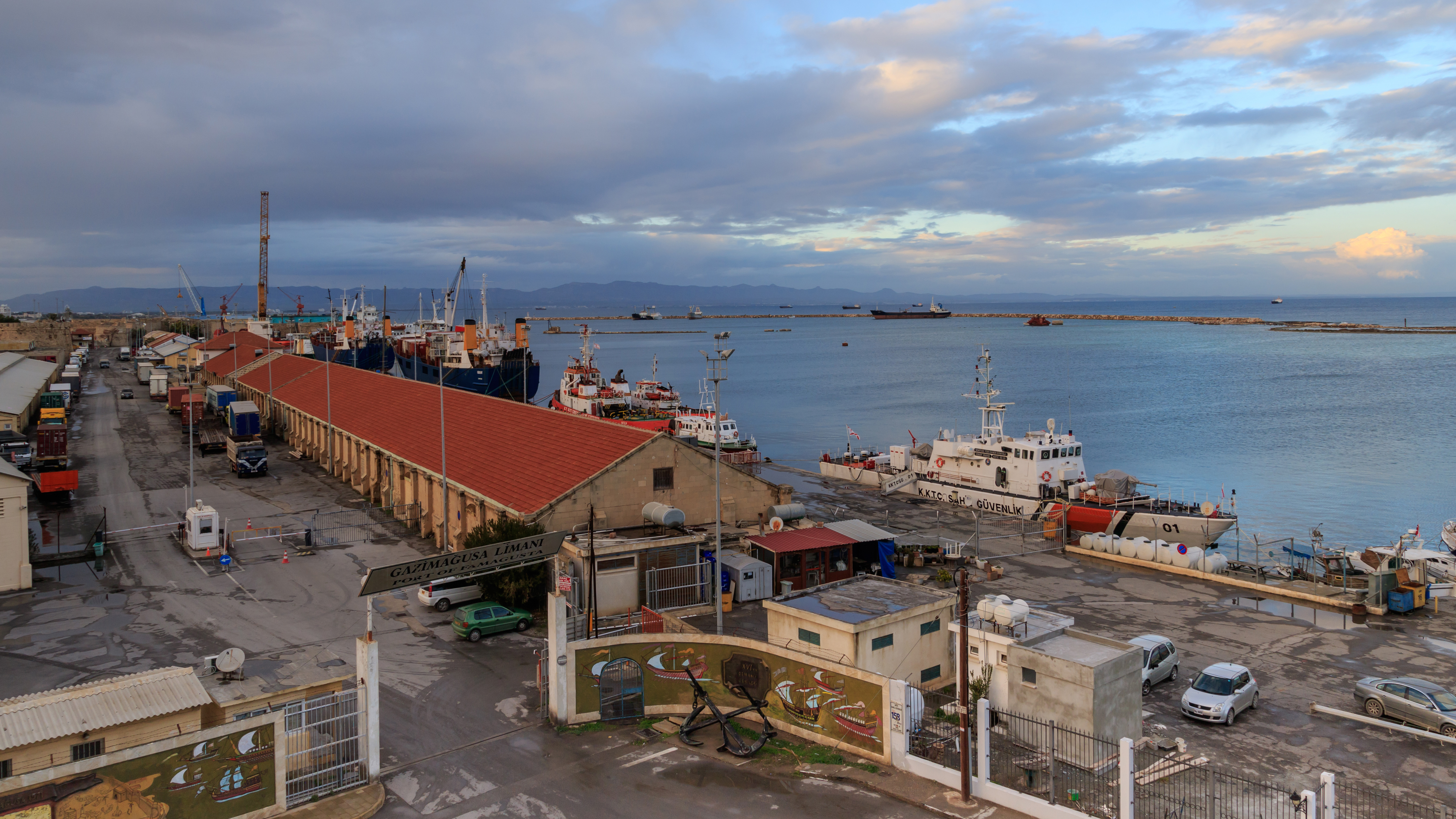
- The port of Famagusta
- Interactive map of Port of Famagusta
- Location in Cyprus

Location
- Location: Cyprus
- Coordinates: 35°08′N 33°57′E

The Port of Famagusta is a seaport in Famagusta, Cyprus. There is a free zone ("Famagusta Free Zone") in the port.

The port is under the de facto control of Northern Cyprus. The ports of Northern Cyprus are not registered to the International Maritime Organization (IMO).

The port is open to international vessel traffic.
