= Directorate General for Police =

Law-enforcement and fire-rescue service of Northern Cyprus

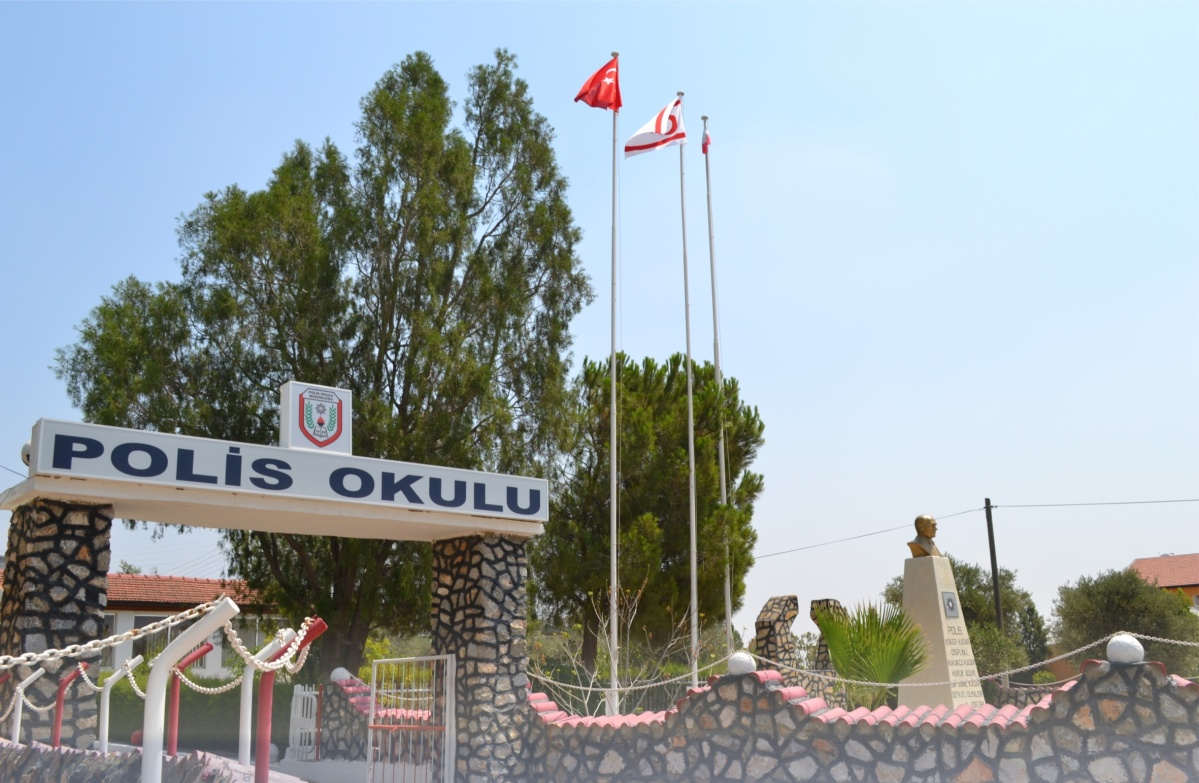
TRNC Police School Directorate

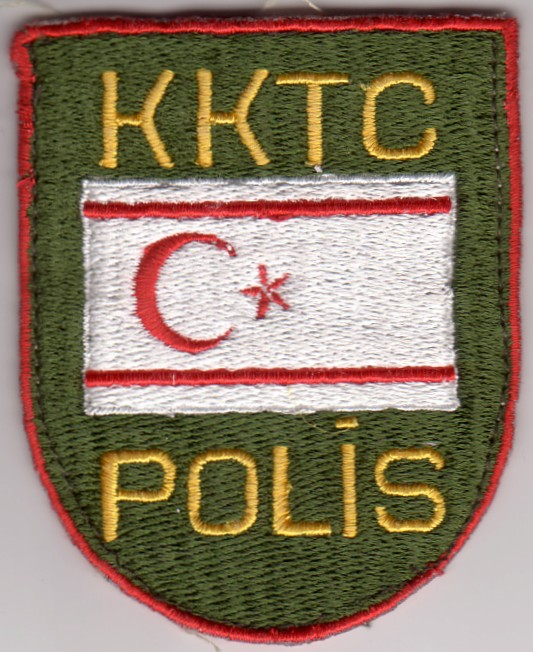
old police coat of arms

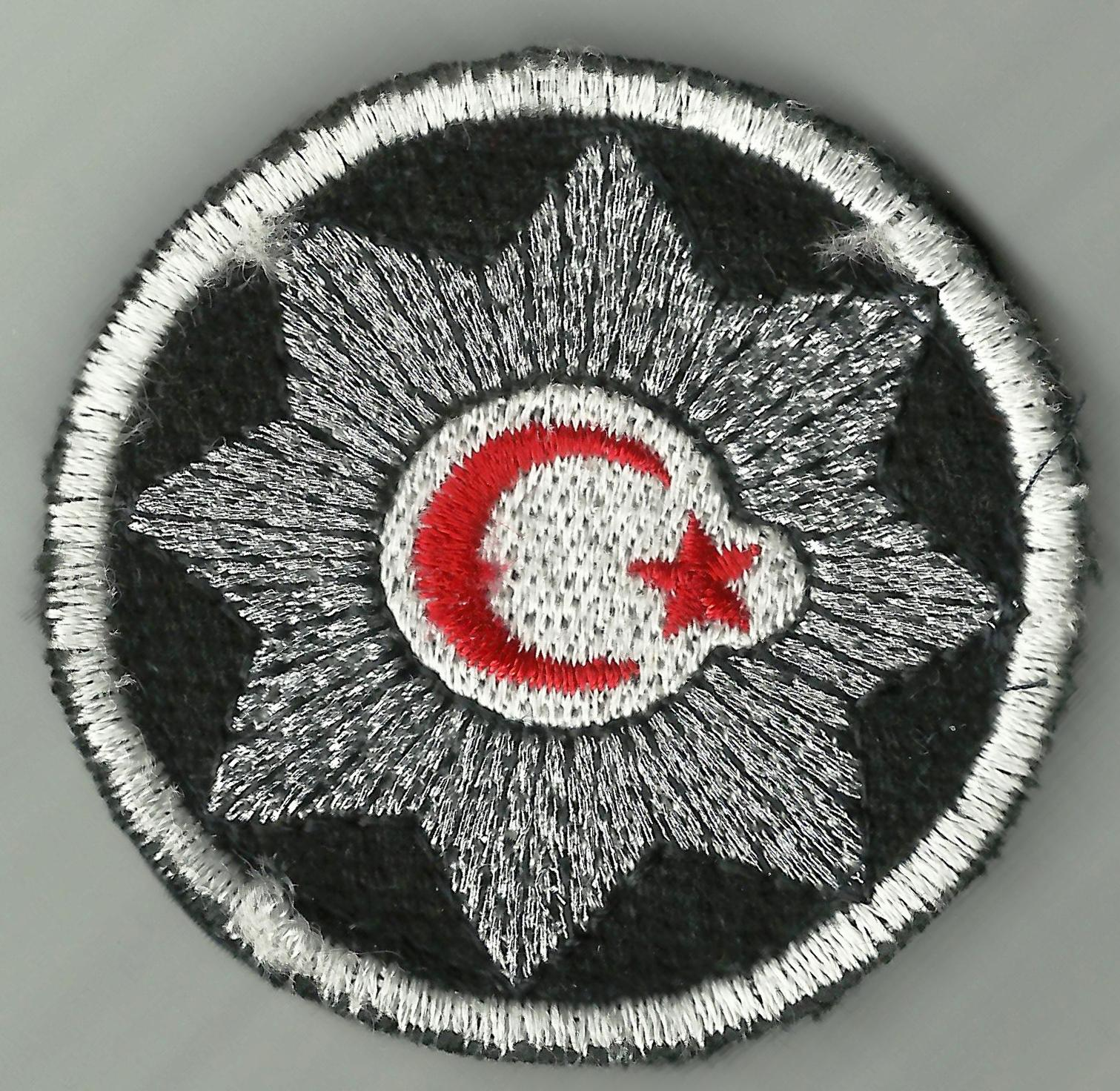
Old police patch

The Directorate General for Police (DGP) (Turkish: Polis Genel Müdürlüğü) is the police and fire-rescue organization of Northern Cyprus. This agency is part of the Security Forces Command, making it technically a gendarmerie.

== History ==
The roots of DGP goes back to Ottoman Police (1571). Two years after the transfer of administration of Cyprus to the United Kingdom in 1878, the Cyprus Military Police was founded. In 1936, the word "Military" was removed from the name and it became "Cyprus Police", which lasted until 1960. Following the independence of the Republic of Cyprus from the United Kingdom in 1960, organisation of policing was separated between the Cyprus Police and the Gendarme. In 1960, the Cyprus Police numbered 1019, with 604 Greek Cypriot and 415 Turkish Cypriot officers. The Cyprus Police Firearms Unit had 125 Greek Cypriots and 56 Turkish Cypriots out of a total 181 officers.

Between 1 April 1955 and 1974, the EOKA killed over 40 Turkish Cypriot policemen.

After the collapse of the partnership government in 1963, the Turkish Cypriot police and gendarmes formed the police organization "Directorate General for Police" (DGP). Following the Turkish Invasion of Cyprus in 1974, this then became Turkish Republic of Northern Cyprus Directorate General for Police (TRNC DGP).

TRNC Special Operation Department is police tactical unit of the TRNC DGP.

== Police School ==
Police School of Northern Cyprus is a member of International Association of Police Academies (INTERPA).

== Branches ==
- Directorate General for Police
  - Administrative Police Department
  - Directorate of Judicial Police
  - Traffic Directorate
  - Police School Directorate
  - Immigration Directorate
  - Administrative Affairs and Personnel Affairs Directorate
  - Communication and Information Technologies Directorate
  - Political Police Department
  - Narcotics and Smuggling Prevention Directorate
  - R&D Directorate
  - Supervisory Board
  - Financial Police
  - Executive assistant
  - Police band
  - TRNC Special Operation Department

== Directorates ==
- Provincial Directorates
- Lefkosa Police Department
- Girne Police Department
- Güzelyurt Police Department
- İskele Police Department
- Famagusta Police Department

== Ranks ==
The General Directorate of Police uses the rank system consisting of nine classes.

Director				Inspector			Officer
1st Class Police General Director (PGM)	2. Class; Police General Manager I / II. Vice (PGM)	3rd Class Police Director (Md)	4th grade Police Deputy Director (Md / Mv)	5th grade Police Chief Inspector (B / Müf)	6th grade Police Inspector (Muf)	7th grade Police Assistant Inspector (M / Mv)	8th grade Police Sergeant (PÇ)	9th grade Police officer (PM)

Civilian service officers working within the General Directorate of Police use the rank system consisting of four degrees.

Civil Service Officer
IV. Degree Civil Service Officer	III. Degree Civil Service Officer	II. Degree Civil Service Officer	I.Degree Civil Service Officer
