= Myriade =

European miniaturized satellite platform

Myriade is a European miniaturized satellite platform developed by EADS Astrium and CNES. EADS Astrium offers the Myriade bus under the commercial name Astrosat-100. CNES began developing Myriade in 1998, as a continuation of the Proteus program.

== Description ==
Myriade satellites are cube-shaped, measuring 60 cm along one side, and weigh between 100 and 200 kg. The control system is a Transputer T805 with 1 Gigabit of memory and capable of 5 MIPS. It interfaces with FPGA and PIC microcontrollers that control onboard equipment over an i2c bus. Power is provided by one steerable gallium arsenide solar array. Communication is by two S band transceivers, offering downlink rates of up to 400 kbit/s, and an optional X band system with downlink rates of 18-72 Mbit/s.

== Launched Myriade satellites ==
The first Myriade based system was Demeter (Detection of Electro-Magnetic Emissions Transmitted from Earthquake Regions), launched in June 2004.

Since then, missions have included:

- PARASOL, a French-built Earth observing research satellite - launched in December 2004.
- Essaim, a French military reconnaissance microsatellite constellation - launched in December 2004.
- Spirale, a demonstrator system which includes two 120 kilograms (260 lb) microsatellites - launched in February 2009.
- Picard, dedicated to the simultaneous measurement of the absolute total and spectral solar irradiance, the diameter and solar shape, and to probing the Sun's interior - launched in June 2010.
- ELISA : ELISA 1, ELISA 2, ELISA 3 and ELISA 4 are a suite of French military satellites - launched on December 17, 2011.
- MICROSCOPE, ministallite designed to test the weak equivalence principle to two orders of magnitude better than can be achieved by ground-based experiments. Launched in 25 April 2016.
- TARANIS, launched in November 2020 but experienced launch failure (due to rocket) and did not achieve orbit.
