= 100 Year Starship =

Grant project to work toward achieving interstellar travel

The 100 Year Starship project (100YSS) was a one-year joint U.S. Defense Advanced Research Projects Agency (DARPA) and National Aeronautics and Space Administration (NASA) effort "to take the first step in the next era of space exploration—a journey between the stars". The study explored development of a viable and sustainable model for persistent, long-term, private-sector investment into the myriad of disciplines needed to make interstellar space travel practicable and feasible. The goal was to examine what it would take — organizationally, technically, sociologically and ethically — to develop the ability to send humans to another star within 100 years. The study culminated in a $500,000 grant awarded to a consortium under the lead of the Dorothy Jemison Foundation for Excellence, which led to the creation of an independent organization inheriting the name 100 Year Starship from DARPA. Annual 100YSS symposia were organized from 2011 to 2015, and again in 2023.

== Origin ==
The 100 Year Starship study was conceived in the summer of 2010 by the director of the DARPA Tactical Technology Office, David Neyland, as an effort seeded by DARPA to develop a viable and sustainable model for persistent, long-term, private-sector investment into the myriad of disciplines needed to make long-distance space travel practicable and feasible. The study was intended to foster a rebirth of a sense of wonder among students, academia, industry, researchers and the general population to consider "why not" and to encourage them to tackle whole new classes of research and development related to all the issues surrounding long duration, long distance spaceflight. DARPA suggested that such research might benefit the Department of Defense and NASA, as well as the private and commercial sector. This was similar to how science fiction spurred generations of scientists and engineers to follow the career paths they did, as an avenue to capture the imagination of people who normally wouldn't think of doing research and development and tag them with something they would be excited about. The inspiration for 100YSS was the Robert Heinlein 1956 science fiction novel, Time for the Stars, in which the Long Range Foundation created technologies that took generations to deliver, but eventually benefited the entire species. Neyland assigned the Tactical Technology Office's Paul Eremenko to be the program manager and study coordinator for 100YSS. Eremenko convinced NASA Ames Research Center director Pete Worden to collaborate with DARPA on the project. DARPA funded the effort with $1M and NASA Ames provided $100k of support funding. DARPA intended to begin the yearlong 100YSS study on 1/11/11, with a gathering of visionaries for strategic planning, followed by a commercial request for proposals in the summer of 2011, then an international symposium in the fall of 2011 and finally an award of a research foundation grant in late 2011. However, Worden preempted DARPA and prematurely announced the nascent study prior to internal government coordination, at San Francisco's Long Conversation conference in October 2010. This caused considerable issue within government circles and forced DARPA to immediately follow-up with an early press release from Eremenko.

== 100YSS Strategic Planning Session ==
On January 10 & 11, 2011, DARPA gathered 30 scientists, entrepreneurs and science fiction writers in a two-day by-invitation-only brainstorming session in northern California, at Cavallo Point, near San Francisco, to chart the course for the 100 Year Starship study. The agenda consisted of cycling through the "why, what, and how" to create an organization that could sustain research that could lead to the creation of a starship in roughly 100 years.

Non-affiliated attendees included:

- Elizabeth Bear (science fiction writer)
- Jim Benford (Microwave Sciences)
- Peter Diamandis (Xprize Foundation, facilitator for the 100YSS Strategic Planning Session)
- Lou Friedman (Planetary Society [retired])
- Joe Haldeman (science fiction writer)
- Barbara Marx Hubbard (Foundation for Conscious Evolution)
- Mae Jemison (Former Astronaut, active in various educational endeavors)
- Harry Kloor (Chief science advisor for the X Prize organization)
- Marc Millis (Tau Zero Foundation)
- Alexander Rose (Long Now Foundation)
- Jack Sarfatti (StarDrive.org)
- Dan Sherkow (Global Universal Entertainment)
- Jill Tarter (Search for Extraterrestrial Intelligence – SETI Inst.)
- Jacques Vallée (Euro-America Ventures & Co-developer of ARPANET [led to Internet])
- Craig Venter (J. Craig Venter Institute, first to sequence the human genome)
- Claudia Welss (Assistant to Barbara Marx Hubbard)

DARPA attendees:

- David Neyland (Progenitor of 100YSS, director of the DARPA Tactical Technology Office)
- Paul Eremenko (coordinator and program manager for 100YSS)
- Roger Hall (DARPA space systems program manager)

NASA attendees:

- Pete Worden (NASA-Ames Director)
- Jay Falker (NASA-HQ & NIAC lead)
- Rachel Hoover (NASA-Ames, Public Affairs)
- Peter Klupar (NASA-Ames)
- Larry Lemke (NASA-Ames)
- Creon Levit (NASA-Ames – assigned to lead this 100-yr study)
- Lisa Lockyer (NASA-Ames)
- Alex MacDonald (NASA-Ames)
- Dawn McIntosh (NASA-Ames – on temporary assignment to DARPA for 100YSS)
- Alen Weston (NASA-Ames)
- Matt Daniels (NASA-Ames & Stanford PhD student)

A majority of participants agreed on three immediate-term issues associated with the creation of a new organization or foundation of this nature: intellectual property (IP), credibility, and leadership and governance.

== 100YSS Request for Information and Solicitation ==
On May 3, 2011, DARPA released a Request for Information (RFI) seeking ideas for an organization, business model and approach appropriate for a self-sustaining investment vehicle in support of the 100 Year Starship Study.

Attributes of interest in the RFI included:

- Long-term survivability over a century-long time horizon;
- Self-governance, independent of government participation or oversight;
- Self-sustainment, independent of government funding; and
- Relevance to the goal of moving humanity toward the goal of interstellar travel, including related technological, biological, social, economic, and other issues.

Respondents to the RFI needed to describe an organization and approach for the establishment and operation of the 100 Year Starship research entity (or foundation):

- Organizational structure;
- Governance mechanism;
- Investment strategy and criteria; and
- Business model for long-term self-sustainment.

DARPA received over 150 responses to the RFI.

The RFI was followed on August 26, 2011 by formal solicitation for award of a grant. To meet the needs of the August 26th solicitation DARPA planned to award in the late fall 2011 a single entity, organization or foundation a grant for initial startup, operating expenses and initial intellectual property.

== 100 Year Starship Symposia ==
On June 15, 2011, DARPA announced the 100 Year Starship Study Public Symposium, organized by DARPA's Tactical Technology Office director, David Neyland, with NASA Ames serving as execution agent. DARPA planned to encourage dialog about "all the aspects of interstellar flight ... hoping that ethicists, lawyers, science fiction writers, technologists and others, will participate." DARPA contended that the "useful, unanticipated consequences of such research – benefits from improved propulsion to energy storage and life support – can ultimately benefit the Department of Defense and to NASA, as well as the private and commercial sector."

DARPA and NASA solicited papers for the symposium on topics including:

- Time-Distance Solutions [propulsion, time/space manipulation and/or dilation, near speed of light navigation, faster than light navigation, observations and sensing at near speed of light or faster than light]
- Education, Social, Economic and Legal Considerations [education as a mission, who goes, who stays, to profit or not, economies in space, communications back to earth, political ramifications, round-trip legacy investments and assets left behind]
- Philosophical, and Religious Considerations [why go to the stars, moral and ethical issues, implications of finding habitable worlds, implications of finding life elsewhere, implications of being left behind]
- Biology and Space Medicine [physiology in space, psychology in space, human life suspension (e.g., cryogenic), medical facilities and capabilities in space, on-scene (end of journey) spawning from genetic material]
- Habitats and Environmental Science [to have gravity or not, space and radiation effects, environmental toxins, energy collection and use, agriculture, self-supporting environments, optimal habitat sizing]
- Destinations [criteria for destination selection, what do you take, how many destinations and missions, probes versus journeys of faith]
- Communication of the Vision [storytelling as a means of inspiration, linkage between incentives, payback and investment, use of movies, television and books to popularize long term research and long term journeys]

Three days prior to the start of the Symposium, then director of DARPA, Dr. Regina E. Dugan, and her deputy, Dr Kaighan (Ken) Gabriel, discussed the plan and intent of the symposium with Neyland and requested he cancel the entire event. Neyland explained how visible and public it was, with world travelers already en route to attend. He suggested that cancelling would have a more negative impact than letting it happen. Dugan and Gabriel agreed to let the symposium proceed, but required removal of all DARPA and NASA logos and emblems, as well as curtailing participation by DARPA personnel. They also insisted that no public video, audio recordings or photography would be allowed, and no proceedings or papers would be officially published.

The symposium was held in Orlando, Florida, from September 30 to October 2, 2011. It included presentations on the technology, biology, physics, philosophy, sociology, and economics of interstellar flight. More than 500 papers were submitted and more than 700 people attended. Select papers from the conference were published in the Journal of the British Interplanetary Society.

Neyland, who orchestrated the one-year starship study, provided the welcome and introduction at the Symposium, but no other DARPA personnel spoke. No high-level NASA officials spoke at the symposium either, other than Pete Worden, director of the NASA Ames Research Center in California, whom Neyland described as a "co-conspirator" and who was often regarded as a maverick in the space agency.

In 2012, after the Jemison Foundation was named as the winner of the DARPA 100YSS grant, it organized the second symposium in Houston. Papers on many subjects related to interstellar flight and organizational foundations were presented. In 2013 and 2014 symposia were held in Houston, and a fifth in November 2015. The sixth symposium was held in Nairobi, Kenya from January 31-February 4, 2023.

== 100YSS Intellectual Property ==
By design, DARPA invested in the instruments of intellectual property to support the eventual selection of an organization to carry the 100YSS vision forward. DARPA established and copyrighted the 100YSS.org website and trademarked the original names, acronyms, logos and artwork. At the award of the 100YSS grant, 100YSS intellectual property rights and trademarks were passed in perpetuity to the new 100YSS organization.

== Foundation ==
The 100 Year Starship study was the name of the one-year DARPA project to explore development of a viable and sustainable model for persistent, long-term, private-sector investment into the myriad of disciplines needed to make interstellar space travel practicable and feasible. The outcome of the study was the selection of an organization to carry the vision forward. The winning bid was the Dorothy Jemison Foundation for Excellence, partnering with Icarus Interstellar and the Foundation for Enterprise Development, led by the American physician and former NASA astronaut Mae Jemison. In 2012, the consortium was awarded a $500,000 grant for further work. The new organization was granted the 100YSS intellectual property from DARPA and maintained the organizational name 100 Year Starship. It was planned that the Dorothy Jemison Foundation for Excellence would team up with Icarus Interstellar, where the latter would work on the technical challenges of 100YSS.

After the Jemison Foundation was named as the winner of the grant, it organized the second symposium in Houston. Papers on many subjects related to interstellar flight and organizational foundations were presented. In 2013 and 2014 symposia were also held in Houston, and a fifth was held in Austria in November 2015.

== Canopus Awards ==
=== 2015 Canopus Awards ===
In 2015, the 100 Year Starship project hosted its first Canopus Awards for excellence in interstellar writing. The winners were announced October 30, 2015, at the symposium:

- Previously Published Long-Form Fiction (40,000 words or more): InterstellarNet: Enigma by Edward M. Lerner (FoxAcre). ISBN 978-1936771646
- Previously Published Short-Form Fiction (1,000–40,000 words): "The Waves" by Ken Liu (Asimov's 12/12)
- Original Fiction (1,000–5,000 words): "Everett's Awakening" by Yelcho (i.e., R. Buckalew)
- Original Nonfiction (1,000–5,000 words): "Finding Earth 2.0 from the Focus of the Solar Gravitational Lens" by Louis Friedman and Slava Turyshev

=== 2017 Canopus Awards ===
A second Canopus Award competition was run in 2017. The winners were:

- Previously Published Long-Form Fiction (40,000 words or more): The Three-Body Problem, by Liu Cixin, translated by Ken Liu (published by Tor)
- Previously Published Short-Form Fiction (1,000–40,000 words): "Slow Bullets" by Alastair Reynolds (published by Tachyon Publications)
- Previously Published Nonfiction (1,000–40,000 words): Welcome to Mars: Making a Home on the Red Planet, by Buzz Aldrin and Marianne Dyson (published by National Geographic)
- Original Fiction (1,000–5,000 words): "The Quest for New Cydonia" by Russell Hemmell
- Original Nonfiction (1,000–5,000 words): "Microbots—The Seeds of Interstellar Civilization" by Robert Buckalew
- Original College Writing (1,000–5,000 words): "A Kingdom of Ends" by Ryan Burgess

=== 2023 Canopus Awards ===
A third Canopus Award competition has been announced for 2023. A new category, "Original Local Short-form Fiction," open to continental African writers, was introduced for the 2023 award. The finalists, by category, are:

- Published Long-Form Fiction:
  - Escaping Exodus by Nicky Drayden (published by HarperVoyager)
  - Light Chaser by Peter F. Hamilton and Gareth L. Powell (published by Tor)
  - Sweep of Stars by Maurice Broaddus (published by Tor)
  - Braking Day by Adam Oyebanji (published by DAW)
  - Project Hail Mary by Andy Weir (published by Ballantine Books)
  - Sentient by Jeff Lemire and Gabriel Hernandez Walta (published by TKO)
- Published Short-Form Fiction:
  - "Drift-Flux" by Wole Talabi (published in AfroSFv3)
  - "Verisya" by Mari Ness (published in Daily Science Fiction)
  - "Repairs at the Beijing West Space Elevator" by Alex Shvartsman (published in Analog Science Fiction & Fact)
  - "A Sun Will Always Sing" by Karin Lowachee (published in TheVerge.com)
  - "Generations" by Osahon Ize-Iyamu (published in Bikes Not Rockets)
  - "The Hind" by Kevin J. Anderson and Rick Wilber (published in Asimov's Science Fiction)
  - "Tau Ceti Said What?" by Jack McDevitt (published in Asimov's Science Fiction)
- Published Long-Form Nonfiction:
  - A Traveler's Guide to the Stars by Les Johnson (published by Princeton University Press)
  - Extraterrestrial by Avi Loeb (published by Mariner Books)
  - Imagined Life by James Trefil and Michael Summers (published by Smithsonian Books)
  - The Case for Space: How the Revolution in Spaceflight Opens Up a Future of Limitless Possibility by Robert Zubrin (published by Prometheus)
  - Starship Citizens: Indigenous Principles for 100 Year Interstellar Voyages by Dawn Marsden (published by Wood Lake Publishing)
- Published Short-Form Nonfiction:
  - "Language Development During Interstellar Travel" by A. McKenzie and J. Punske (published in Acta Futura)
  - "Artificial Intelligence for Interstellar Travel" by Andreas M. Hein and Stephen Baxter (published in the Journal of the British Interplanetary Society)
  - "Navigation and Star Identification for an Interstellar Mission" by Paul McKee, Jacob Kowalski, and John A. Christian (published in Acta Astronautica)
  - "Joining the 'Galactic Club': What Price Admission? A Hypothetical Case Study of the Impact of Human Rights on a Future Accession of Humanity to Interstellar Civilization Networks" by Michael Bohlander (published in Futures)
  - "Migrating Extraterrestrial Civilizations and Interstellar Colonization: Implications for SETI and SETA" by Irina K. Romanovskaya (published in the International Journal of Astrobiology)
- Published Digital Presentation:
  - Space Haven by Bugbyte LTD. (published by Bugbyte LTD.)
  - The Outer Worlds by Obsidian Entertainment (published by Private Division)
  - Ixion by Bulwark Studios (published by Kasedo Games)
  - Colony Ship by Iron Tower Studio (published by Iron Tower Studio)
  - The Sights of Space: A Voyage to Alien Worlds by MelodySheep (published by MelodySheep)
  - The Fermi Paradox by Anomaly Games (published by Anomaly Games)
- Original Short-Form Fiction:
  - "Tess 16201c" by Faith Guptill
  - "Ortygia" by Scott Jessop
  - "The Interlopers" by Robert Buckalew
  - "We Should Have Guessed" by Terry Franklin
  - "The Living Archaeologist" by Jamiella Brooks
- Original Local Short-Form Fiction:
  - "Gumbojena" by Chioniso Tsikisayi (Zimbabwe)
  - "Space Frenemies" by Oluwatoyin Magbagbeola (Nigeria)
  - "One More Chance" by Chioma Mildred Okonkwo (Nigeria)
- "Incubation" by Amadin Ogbewe (Nigeria)

== Criticism ==
The 100 Year Starship was named in 2012 by U.S. Senator Tom Coburn as one of the 100 most wasteful government spending projects. Coburn specifically cited a 100 Year Starship workshop that included one session, titled "Did Jesus Die for Klingons Too?" that debated the implications for Christian philosophy should life be found on other planets.

== See also ==
- Breakthrough Starshot
- Effect of spaceflight on the human body
- Health threat from cosmic rays
- Human spaceflight
- Interstellar probe
- Interstellar travel
- Nuclear propulsion
