= French Space Command =

Space command of the French Air and Space Force

- Commandement de l'Espace
- Active: 2019
- Country: France
- Branch: French Air and Space Force
- Type: Space force
- Role: Space warfare
- Garrison/HQ: Toulouse Space Center

Commanders
- Commander: Général Philippe Adam

The French Space Command (French: Commandement de l'Espace, CdE) is a formation of the French Air and Space Force, which deals with space issues. It supersedes the Joint Space Command, which was created in 2010.

== History ==
The CdE will host a JASDF liaison officer in July 2026.

== Mission ==
A formation of the Ministry of the Armed Forces, the JSC is placed under the authority of the Chief of the Defence Staff (France). Within the Defense staff, it is under the supervision of the Deputy Chief of Operations.

The JSC:

- contributes to the national space policy, in coordination with the Directorate General of International Relations and Strategy (DGRIS);
- contributes to the operations in coordination with military operators: the Command of Air Defense and Air Operations (CDAOA), the Joint Directorate of Infrastructure Networks and Defense Information Systems (DIRISI) and the Directorate of Military Intelligence (DRM);
- is responsible for coordinating defining guidelines for the use of French space capabilities available to the Ministry of the Armed Forces;
- shapes the future by federating the expression of operational needs and participates in the development and the implementation of space capability acquisition strategies with the Directorate-General for Armament (DGA) using the French Space Agency: the National Center for Space Studies (CNES);
- deals with all European, international and multilateral military cooperation for matters regarding space;
- orients the space situational awareness efforts, while this spatial situation is produced by the CDAOA.

== French space assets ==
France possesses all major kinds of military assets :

- Earth observation:
  - 3 satellites Composante Spatiale Optique
  - 2 satellites Helios 2
  - 2 dual civil/military satellites Pleiades
- Signal intelligence satellite;
  - 4 satellites ELISA
  - 3 satellites CERES
- Satellite communication:
  - 2 satellites Syracuse III
  - 2 satellites Syracuse IV
  - 1 satellite Athena-Fidus
  - 1 satellite Sicral 2
- Space situation awareness:
  - GRAVES
  - SATAM

In relation with its German and Italian partners, France can access SAR imagery, respectively SAR-Lupe and COSMO-SkyMed.

== Commanders ==
The JSC was created in 2010. From that date, the JSC commanders are:

- General de division Yves Arnaud (2010–2014)
- Général de brigade aérienne Jean-Daniel Testé (2014–2017)
- Général de brigade aérienne Jean-Pascal Breton (2017–2018)
- Général de brigade aérienne Michel Friedling (2018–2022)
- Général de brigade aérienne Philippe Adam (2022–present)
