= VDD =

VDD may refer to:

- VDD (voltage), V_{DD}, the label of an IC power supply pin
- A version description document according to MIL-STD-498
- Software development processes value-driven design
- Virtual device driver (disambiguation)
- Voluntary death by dehydration, a suicide method employing terminal dehydration
- Vendor Due Diligence
- VIDAS D-dimer
