= Space command =

Type of military organization

A space command is a military organization with responsibility for space operations and warfare. A space command is typically a joint organization or organized within a larger military branch and is distinct from a fully independent space force. The world's first space command, the United States' Air Force Space Command was established in 1982 and later became the United States Space Force in 2019.

== History ==
In the United States and the Soviet Union, the early military space programs were managed by individual military services. In the United States, the Air Force and its various major commands were responsible for military space operations, however Air Defense Command was responsible for the majority of space operations. In 1967, it was redesignated Aerospace Defense Command to emphasize its increased space role. Following the inactivation of Aerospace Defense Command in 1980, U.S. space forces were briefly organized under Strategic Air Command, before being organized into Space Command, which was activated in 1982. Space Command, which was the first space command in the world, was redesignated Air Force Space Command in 1985 to distinguish it from the joint U.S. Space Command. The Army and Navy, both possessing smaller space capabilities, both had their own space commands, with Naval Space Command activated in 1983 and Army Space Command activated in 1988.

Soviet space forces were organized under the Strategic Rocket Forces' Central Directorate of Space Assets, which was activated in 1964, before being upgraded to the Main Directorate of Space Assets in 1970. The Soviet Air Defense Forces' Anti-Ballistic Missile and Anti-Space Defense Forces were activated in 1967 and remained a part from the Strategic Missile Forces' space forces.

In 1959, fearing U.S. Air Force dominance of the military space program, the United States Navy's chief of naval operations, Admiral Arleigh Burke, proposed the creation of a Defense Astronautical Agency to manage U.S. military space operations. The proposal of a joint space command did not come to pass until 1985, when United States Space Command was activated to manage U.S. military space activities, overseeing Air Force Space Command, Naval Space Command, and Army Space Command. The Soviet Union also rose the profile of their space forces, moving the Main Directorate of Space Assets from the Strategic Missile Forces to the Soviet Armed Forces General Staff in 1982, before upgrading it into the Chief Directorate of Space Assets and placing it directly in the Ministry of Defence in 1986. In 1981, the U.S.–Canadian North American Air Defense Command was redesignated as the North American Aerospace Defense Command, emphasizing its space role.

Following the collapse of the Soviet Union, the Soviet space forces were reorganized into Russia's Military Space Forces and the Russian Air Defence Forces' Rocket and Space Defence Troops. In 1997, both were merged into the Strategic Rocket Forces, before being split out in 2001 as the Russian Space Forces, which was an independent troops, but not a full independent service. U.S. Army space forces also underwent reorganization, with the Army Space Command being merged with its missile defense forces to form Army Space and Strategic Defense Command in 1992, being redesignated as Army Space and Missile Defense Command in 1997.

With the September 11 Attacks, U.S. space forces were sidelined with the change in focus to the war on terror. In 2002, U.S. Space Command was inactivated and its joint space responsibilities were transferred to United States Strategic Command and Naval Space Command was inactivated, transferring most of its capabilities to Air Force Space Command. Starting in 2005, U.S. Strategic Command began to organize its space forces semi–independently, first as Joint Space Operations, then in 2006 as the Joint Functional Component Command for Space, and in 2017 the Joint Force Space Component Command. In 2019, the United States reestablished United States Space Command, and in 2020, reorganized Air Force Space Command into the United States Space Force, becoming a full independent military branch, with Space Operations Command, reorganized as United States Space Force Combat Forces Command in 2025, serving as its primary space command. To support U.S. Space Command, in 2020 the Navy created Navy Space Command, with United States Tenth Fleet as its operational arm, out of Fleet Cyber Command.

Recognizing the growing importance of space operations, France created the Joint Space Command within the French Air Force in 2010 to manage its space capabilities, reorganizing it into the French Space Command as part of a larger transformation of the French Air Force into the French Air and Space Force in 2019. Russia also reorganized their Space Forces, merging together their Space Forces and air defense elements of the Russian Air Force to form the Russian Aerospace Defense Forces in 2011, moving the space elements into the Aerospace Defense Forces' Russian Space Command. In 2015, it reorganized its space forces again, merging the Russian Air Force and Russian Aerospace Defense Forces to form the Russian Aerospace Forces and recreating the Russian Space Forces as a sub-branch, replacing the Russian Space Command. In 2015, the People's Liberation Army also centralized their space forces as part of the new Strategic Support Force's Space Systems Department. In 2018, India centralized its space forces in a tri-service Defence Space Agency, which is expected to become a full command in the coming years. In 2020, Iran also unveiled their own Space Command under the Islamic Revolutionary Guard Corps Aerospace Force. In 2020, NATO also established a Space Centre as part of Allied Air Command. In 2021, the British Armed Forces established United Kingdom Space Command as a joint command under the leadership of the Royal Air Force, taking over space responsibilities from United Kingdom Strategic Command. In 2021, the Royal Australian Air Force Chief of Air Force announced the intended creation of an Australian Space Command.

== List of space commands ==
- (Australia) Space Command (Australian Defence Force integrated tri-service headquarters within Joint Capabilities Group (JCG))
- Space Operations Group (part of the Japan Air Self-Defense Force)
- (Brazil) Aerospace Operations Command (part of the Brazilian Air Force)
- (Canada) (United States) North American Aerospace Defense Command (multinational command)
- (China) Space Systems Department (part of the People's Liberation Army Strategic Support Force)
- (France) French Space Command (part of the French Air and Space Force)
- (India) Defence Space Agency (Indian Armed Forces joint command)
- (Iran) Iranian Space Command (part of the Islamic Revolutionary Guard Corps Aerospace Force)
- (Italy) Space Operations Command (Italian Armed Forces joint command)
- NATO Space Centre (part of Allied Air Command)
- (Russia) Russian Space Forces (part of the Russian Aerospace Forces)
- United Kingdom Space Command (British Armed Forces joint command)
- United States Space Command (United States Armed Forces joint command)
  - United States Space Force Combat Forces Command (part of the United States Space Force)
  - Army Space and Missile Defense Command (part of the United States Army)
  - Navy Space Command (part of the United States Navy)
Emblems of various space commands

Shield of North American Aerospace Defense Command

Emblem of the French Space Command

Current seal of United States Space Command

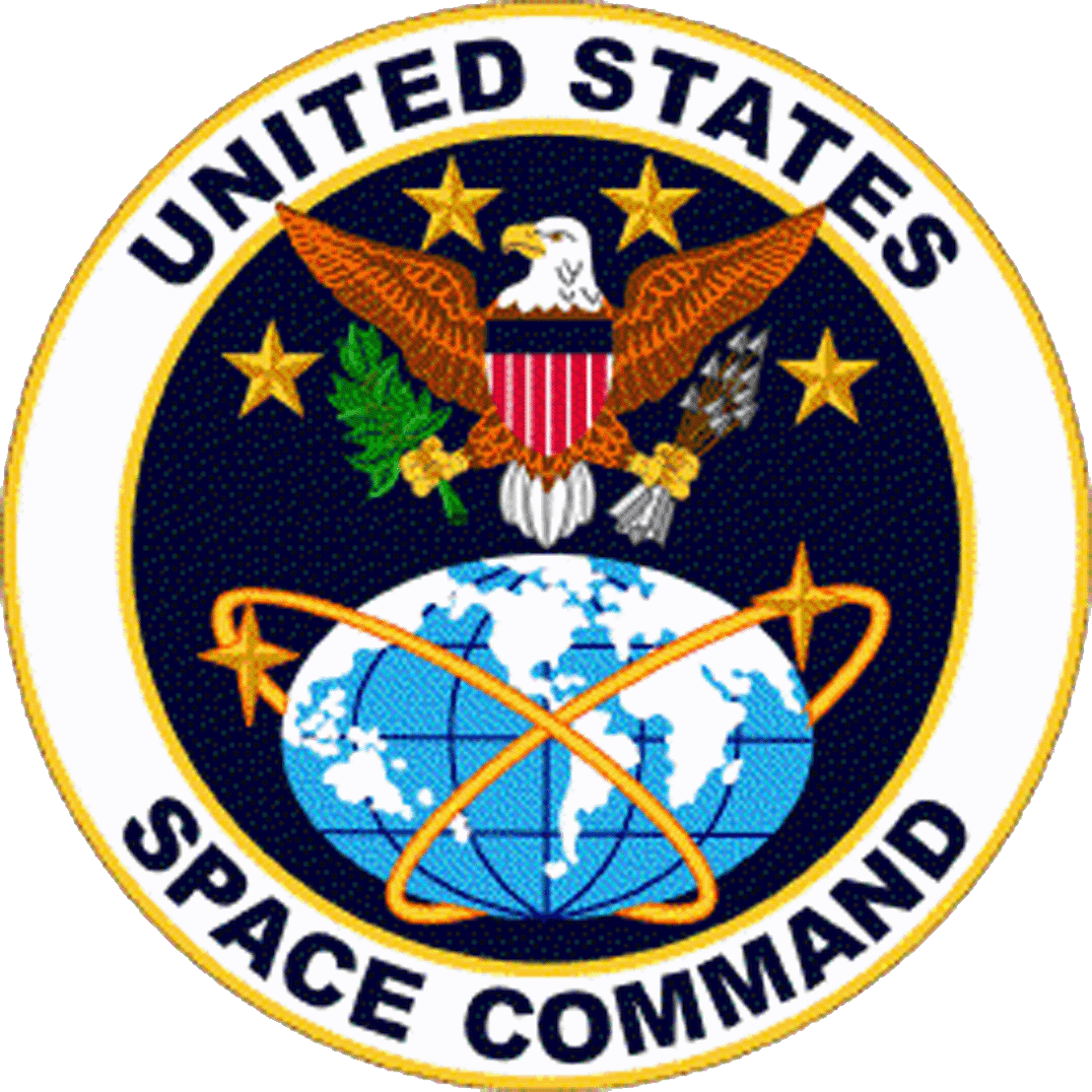
Former seal of United States Space Command
(1985–2002)

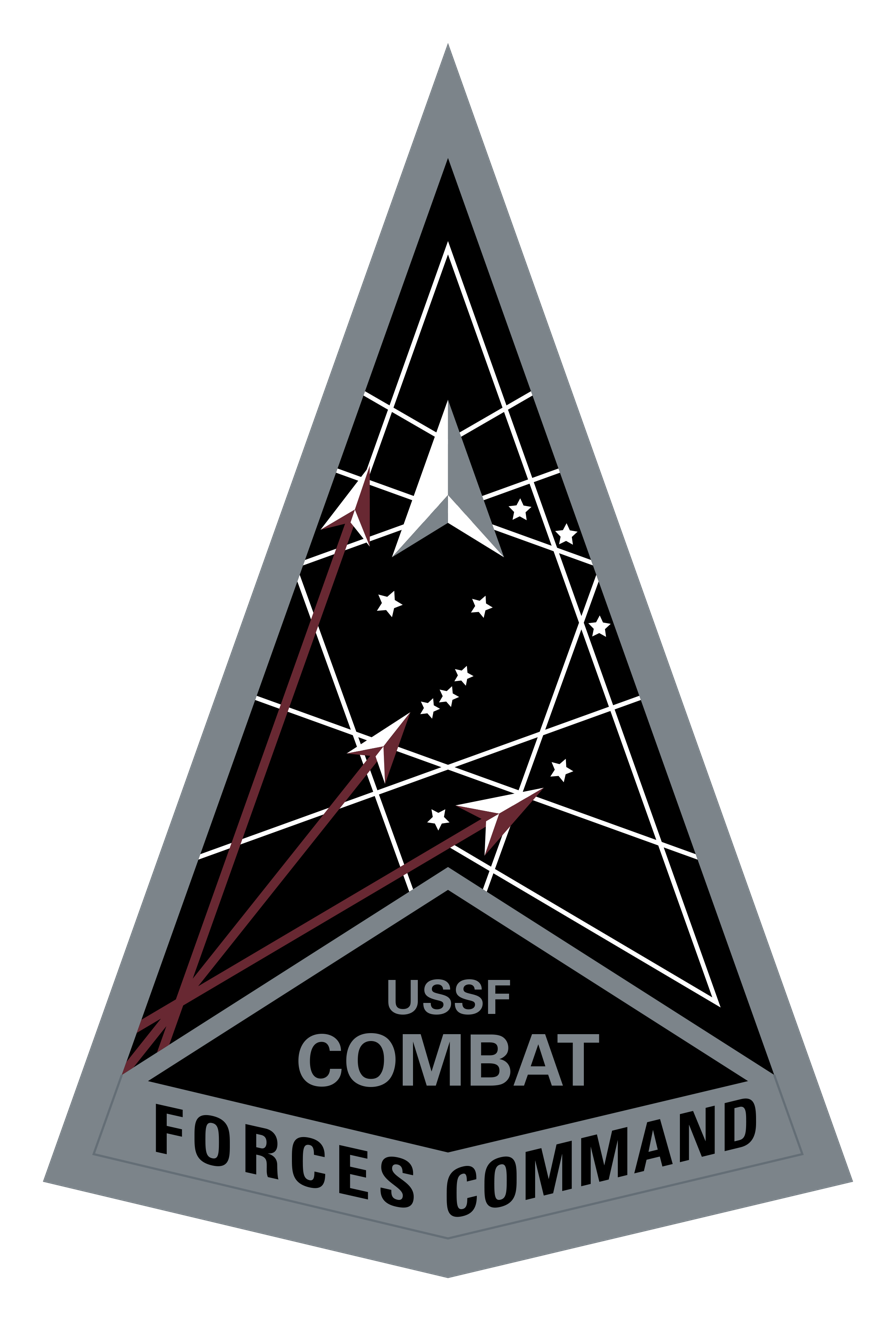
Emblem of United States Space Force Combat Forces Command

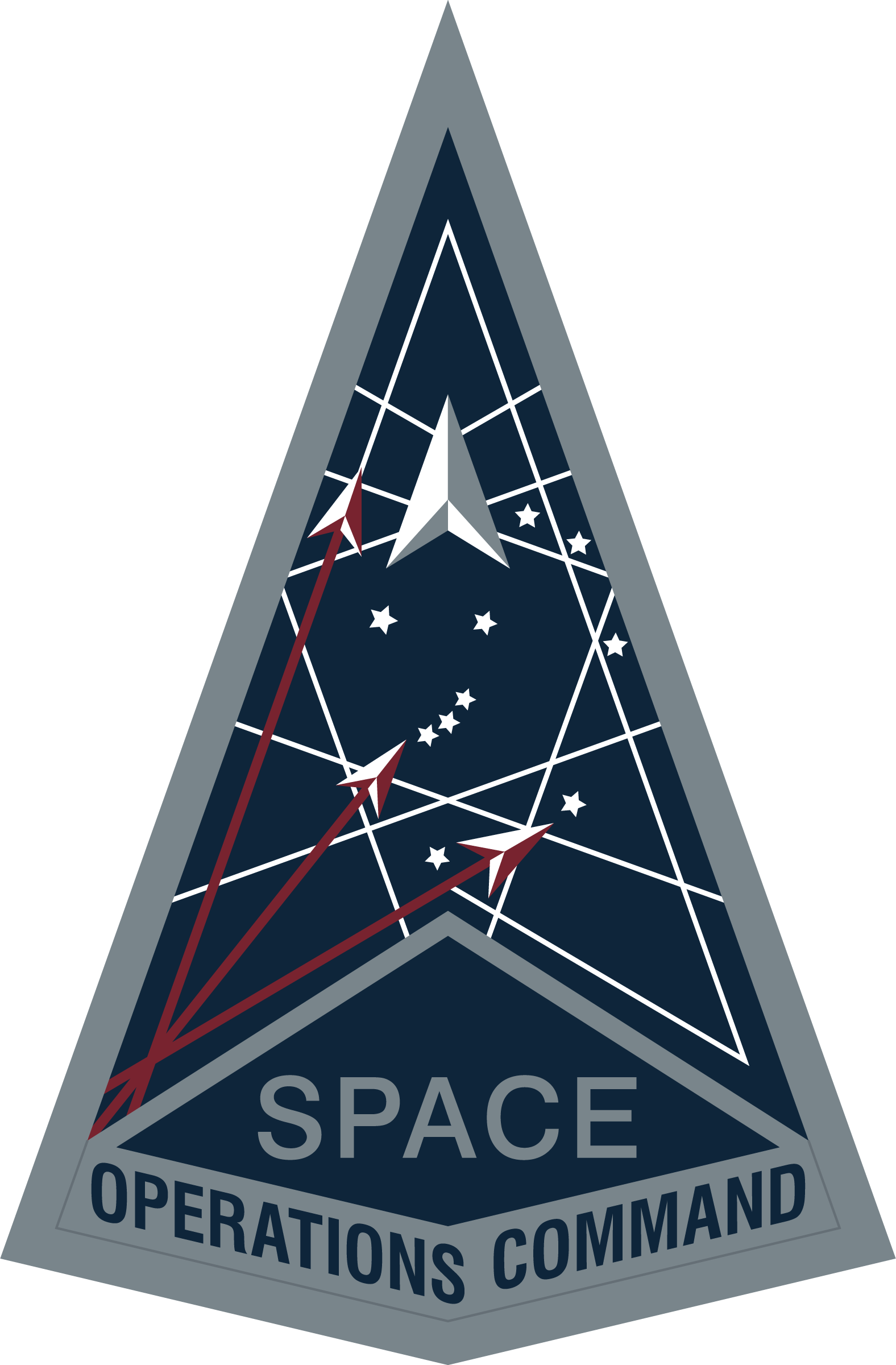
Former emblem of U.S. Space Force Space Operations Command (2020–2025)

Shield of U.S. Air Force Space Command
(1982–2019)

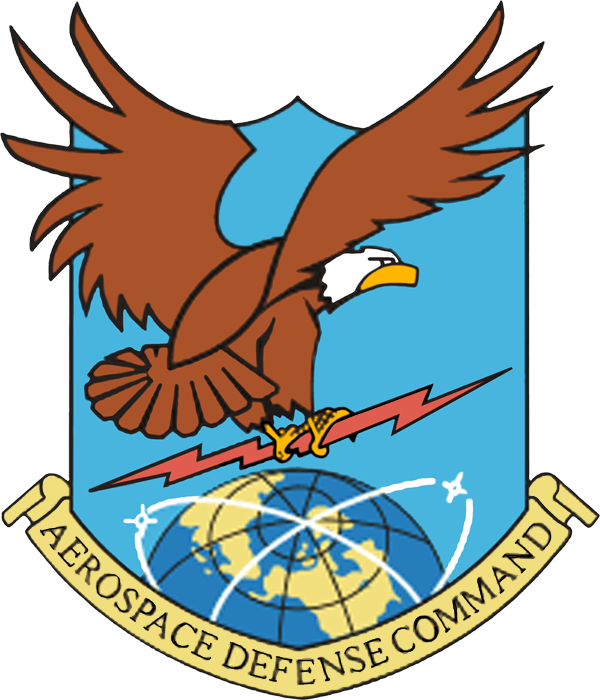
Shield of U.S. Air Force Aerospace Defense Command
(1967–1980)

Shoulder sleeve insignia of U.S. Army Space and Missile Defense Command

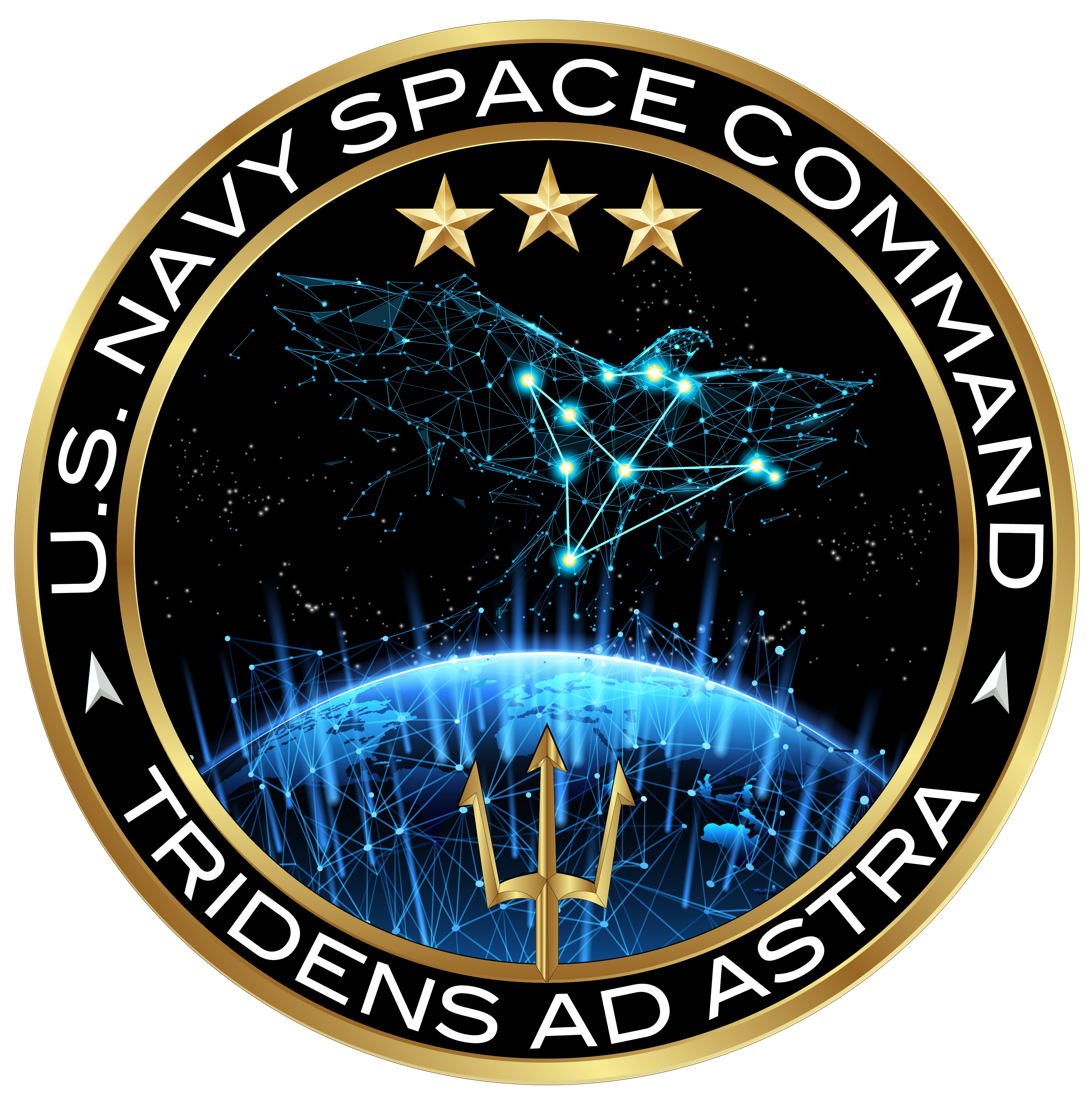
Seal of U.S. Navy Space Command

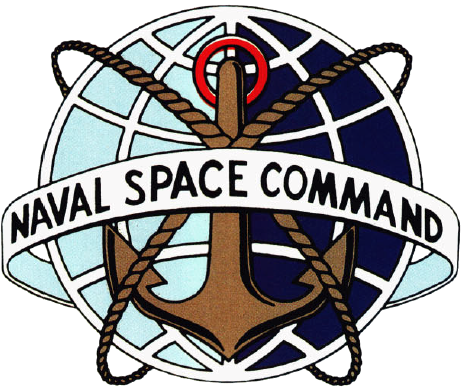
Seal of U.S. Naval Space Command
(1983–2002)

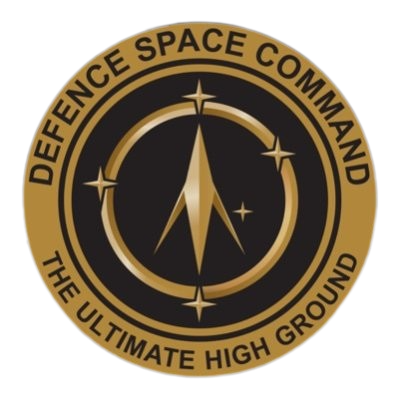
Insignia of the Australian Defence Space Command

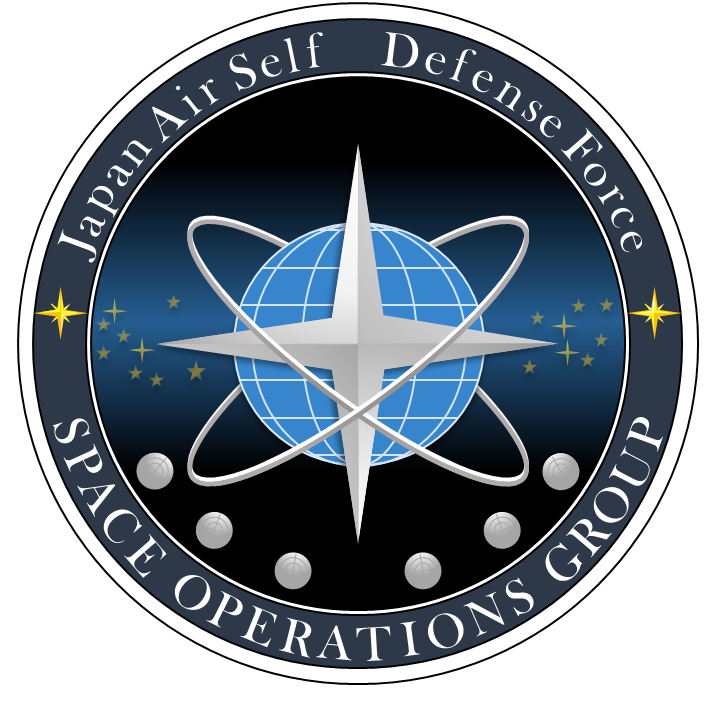
Emblem of the Japanese Space Operations Group

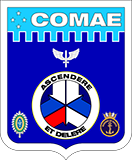
Emblem of the Brazilian Space Command

Emblem of the Russian Space Forces

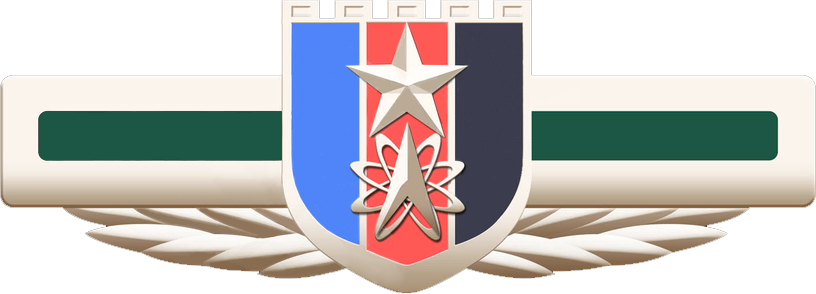
Emblem of the Chinese Strategic Space Forces

== See also ==
- Space force
