= Small satellite =

Satellites of low mass and size, usually under 1200 kg

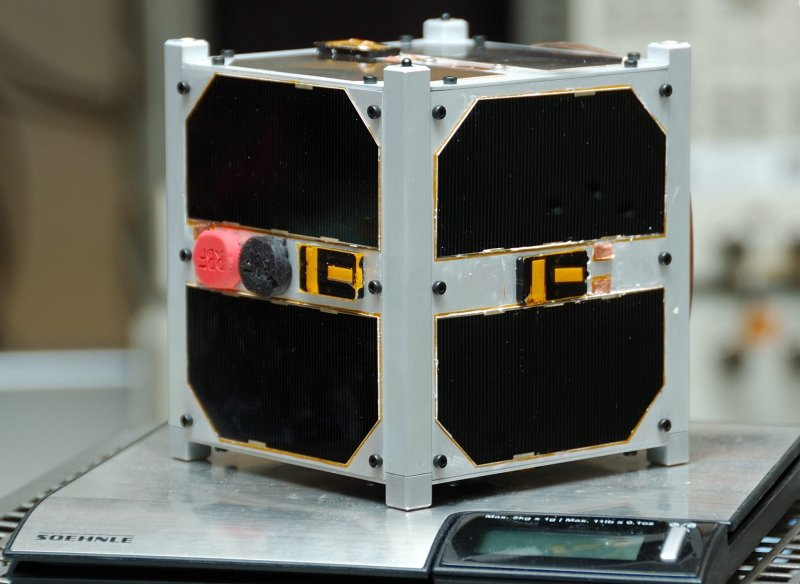
ESTCube-1 1U CubeSat

A small satellite, miniaturized satellite, or smallsat, is a satellite of low mass and size, usually under 1,200 kg (2,600 lb). While all such satellites can be referred to as "small", different classifications are used to categorize them based on mass. Satellites can be built small to reduce the large economic cost of launch vehicles and the costs associated with construction. Miniature satellites, especially in large numbers, may be more useful than fewer, larger ones for some purposes – for example, gathering of scientific data and radio relay. Technical challenges in the construction of small satellites may include the lack of sufficient power storage or of room for a propulsion system.

== Rationales ==
Group name	Mass (kg)
Extra Heavy satellite	> 7,000
Heavy satellite	5,001 to 7,000
Large satellite	4,201 to 5,000
Intermediate satellite	2,501 to 4,200
Medium satellite	1,201 to 2,500
Small satellite	601 to 1,200
Mini satellite	201 to 600
Micro satellite	11 to 200
Nano satellite	1.1 to 10
Pico satellite	0.1 to 1
Femto satellite	<0.1

One rationale for miniaturizing satellites is to reduce the cost; heavier satellites require larger rockets with greater thrust that also have greater cost to finance. In contrast, smaller and lighter satellites require smaller and cheaper launch vehicles and can sometimes be launched in multiples. They can also be launched 'piggyback', using excess capacity on larger launch vehicles. Miniaturized satellites allow for cheaper designs and ease of mass production.

Another major reason for developing small satellites is the opportunity to enable missions that a larger satellite could not accomplish, such as:

- Constellations for low data rate communications
- Using formations to gather data from multiple points
- In-orbit inspection of larger satellites
- University-related research
- Testing or qualifying new hardware before using it on a more expensive spacecraft

== History ==
The nanosatellite and microsatellite segments of the satellite launch industry have been growing rapidly in the 2010s. Development activity in the 1–50 kg (2.2–110.2 lb) range has been significantly exceeding that in the 50–100 kg (110–220 lb) range.

In the 1–50 kg range alone, fewer than 15 satellites were launched annually in 2000 to 2005, 34 in 2006, then fewer than 30 launches annually during 2007 to 2011. This rose to 34 launched in 2012 and 92 launched in 2013.

European analyst Euroconsult projects more than 500 smallsats being launched in 2015–2019 with a market value estimated at US$7.4 billion.

By mid-2015, many more launch options had become available for smallsats, and rides as secondary payloads had become both greater in quantity and easier to schedule on shorter notice.

In a surprising turn of events, the U.S. Department of Defense, which had for decades procured heavy satellites on decade-long procurement cycles, is making a transition to smallsats in the 2020s. In January 2023, the office of space acquisition and integration indicated a desire to move away from large satellites, with small satellites being procured for DoD needs in all orbital regimes, regardless of "whether it's LEO MEO or GEO" while aiming for procurements in under three years. The smaller satellites are deemed to be harder for an enemy to target, as well as providing more resilience through redundancy in the design of a large distributed network of satellite assets.

In 2021, the first autonomous nanosatellites, part of the Adelis-SAMSON mission, designed and developed by the Technion and Rafael in Israel were launched into space. In 2023, SpaceX launched a 20cm quantum communication nano satellite developed by the Tel Aviv University, it is the world's first quantum communication satellite. TAU's nanosatellite is designed to form a quantum communication network as well as communicate with Earth through an optical ground station.

== Classification groups ==
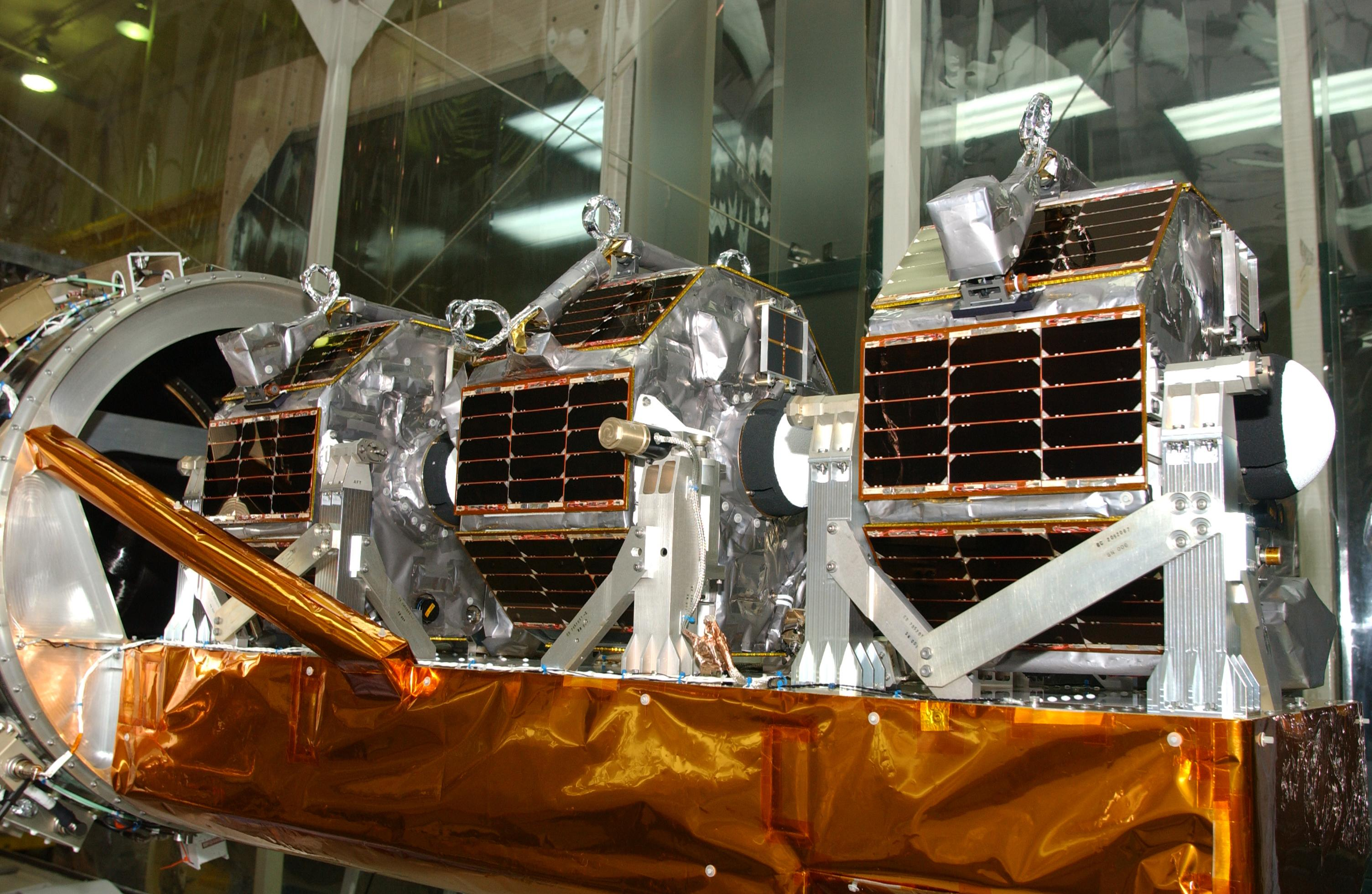
Three microsatellites of Space Technology 5

=== Small satellites ===
The term "small satellite", or sometimes "minisatellite", often refers to an artificial satellite with a wet mass (including fuel) between 100 and 500 kg (220 and 1,100 lb), but in other usage has come to mean any satellite under 500 kg (1,100 lb).

Small satellite examples include Demeter, Essaim, Parasol, Picard, MICROSCOPE, TARANIS, ELISA, SSOT, SMART-1, Spirale-A and -B, and Starlink satellites.

==== Small satellite launch vehicle ====
Although smallsats have traditionally been launched as secondary payloads on larger launch vehicles, a number of companies began development of launch vehicles specifically targeted at the smallsat market. In particular, with larger numbers of smallsats flying, the secondary payload paradigm does not provide the specificity required for many small satellites that have unique orbital and launch-timing requirements.

Some USA-based private companies that at some point in time have launched smallsat launch vehicles commercially:

- Orbital Sciences Corporation's Pegasus (rocket)
- Rocket Lab's Electron (300 kg)
- Virgin Orbit's LauncherOne (500 kg)
- Astra's Rocket 3.3 (100 kg)
- Firefly Aerospace's Firefly Alpha

=== Microsatellites ===
The term "microsatellite" or "microsat" is usually applied to the name of an artificial satellite with a wet mass between 10 and 100 kg (22 and 220 lb). However, this is not an official convention and sometimes those terms can refer to satellites larger than that, or smaller than that (e.g., 1–50 kg (2.2–110.2 lb)). Sometimes, designs or proposed designs from some satellites of these types have microsatellites working together or in a formation. The generic term "small satellite" or "smallsat" is also sometimes used, as is "satlet".

Examples: Astrid-1 and Astrid-2, as well as the set of satellites currently announced for LauncherOne (below)

In 2018, the two Mars Cube One microsats—massing just 13.5 kg (30 lb) each—became the first CubeSats to leave Earth orbit for use in interplanetary space. They flew on their way to Mars alongside the successful Mars InSight lander mission. The two microsats accomplished a flyby of Mars in November 2018, and both continued communicating with ground stations on Earth through late December. Both went silent by early January 2019.

==== Microsatellite launch vehicle ====
A number of commercial and military-contractor companies are currently developing microsatellite launch vehicles to perform the increasingly targeted launch requirements of microsatellites. While microsatellites have been carried to space for many years as secondary payloads aboard larger launchers, the secondary payload paradigm does not provide the specificity required for many increasingly sophisticated small satellites that have unique orbital and launch-timing requirements.

In July 2012, Virgin Orbit announced LauncherOne, an orbital launch vehicle designed to launch "smallsat" primary payloads of 100 kg (220 lb) into low Earth orbit, with launches projected to begin in 2016. Several commercial customers have already contracted for launches, including GeoOptics, Skybox Imaging, Spaceflight Industries, and Planetary Resources. Both Surrey Satellite Technology and Sierra Nevada Space Systems are developing satellite buses "optimized to the design of LauncherOne". Virgin Orbit has been working on the LauncherOne concept since late 2008, and as of 2015, is making it a larger part of Virgin's core business plan as the Virgin human spaceflight program has experienced multiple delays and a fatal accident in 2014.

In December 2012, DARPA announced that the Airborne Launch Assist Space Access program would provide the microsatellite rocket booster for the DARPA SeeMe program that intended to release a "constellation of 24 micro-satellites (~20 kg (44 lb) range) each with 1-m imaging resolution." The program was cancelled in December 2015.

In April 2013, Garvey Spacecraft was awarded a US$200,000 contract to evolve their Prospector 18 suborbital launch vehicle technology into an orbital nanosat launch vehicle capable of delivering a 10 kg (22 lb) payload into a 250 km (160 mi) orbit to an even-more-capable clustered "20/450 Nano/Micro Satellite Launch Vehicle" (NMSLV) capable of delivering 20 kg (44 lb) payloads into 450 km (280 mi) circular orbits.

The Boeing Small Launch Vehicle is an air-launched three-stage-to-orbit launch vehicle concept aimed to launch small payloads of 45 kg (100 lb) into low Earth orbit. The program is proposed to drive down launch costs for U.S. military small satellites to as low as US$300,000 per launch ($7,000/kg) and, if the development program was funded, as of 2012 could be operational by 2020.

The Swiss company Swiss Space Systems (S3) announced plans in 2013 to develop a suborbital spaceplane named SOAR that would launch a microsat launch vehicle capable of putting a payload of up to 250 kg (550 lb) into low Earth orbit.

The Spanish company PLD Space was born in 2011 with the objective of developing low cost launch vehicles called Miura 1 and Miura 5 with the capacity to place up to 150 kg (330 lb) into orbit.

=== Nanosatellites ===
Launched nanosatellites as of December 2023

The term "nanosatellite" or "nanosat" is applied to an artificial satellite with a wet mass between 1 and 10 kg (2.2 and 22.0 lb). Designs and proposed designs of these types may be launched individually, or they may have multiple nanosatellites working together or in formation, in which case, sometimes the term "satellite swarm" or "fractionated spacecraft" may be applied. Some designs require a larger "mother" satellite for communication with ground controllers or for launching and docking with nanosatellites. Over 2300 nanosatellites have been launched as of December 2023.

A CubeSat is a common type of nanosatellite, built in cube form based on multiples of 10 cm × 10 cm × 10 cm, with a mass of no more than 1.33 kilograms (2.9 lb) per unit. The CubeSat concept was first developed in 1999 by a collaborative team of California Polytechnic State University and Stanford University, and the specifications, for use by anyone planning to launch a CubeSat-style nanosatellite, are maintained by this group.

With continued advances in the miniaturization and capability increase of electronic technology and the use of satellite constellations, nanosatellites are increasingly capable of performing commercial missions that previously required microsatellites. For example, a 8 kg (18 lb) 6U CubeSat standard has been proposed to enable a satellite constellation of 35 Earth-imaging satellites to replace a constellation of five 156 kg (344 lb) Earth-imaging satellites. As costs lower and production times shorten, nanosatellites are becoming increasingly feasible ventures for companies.

Some examples of nanosatellites are the ExoCube (CP-10), ArduSat, and SPROUT. Nanosatellite developers and manufacturers include EnduroSat, GomSpace, NanoAvionics, NanoSpace, Spire, Surrey Satellite Technology, NovaWurks, Dauria Aerospace, Planet Labs and Reaktor.

==== Nanosat market ====
In the ten years of nanosat launches prior to 2014, only 75 nanosats were launched. Launch rates picked up substantially when in the three-month period from November 2013–January 2014 94 nanosats were launched.

One challenge of using nanosats has been the economic delivery of such small satellites to anywhere beyond low Earth orbit. By late 2014, proposals were being developed for larger spacecraft specifically designed to deliver swarms of nanosats to trajectories that are beyond Earth orbit for applications such as exploring distant asteroids.

==== Nanosatellite launch vehicle ====
With the emergence of the technological advances of miniaturization and increased capital to support private spaceflight initiatives in the 2010s, several startups have been formed to pursue opportunities with developing a variety of small-payload Nanosatellite Launch Vehicle (NLV) technologies.

NLVs proposed or under development include:

- Virgin Orbit LauncherOne upper stage, intended to be air-launched from WhiteKnightTwo similar to how the SpaceShipTwo spaceplane is launched.
- Ventions' Nanosat upper stage.
- Nammo/Andøya North Star (polar orbit–capable launcher for a 10 kg (22 lb) payload)
- As of April 2013, Garvey Spacecraft (now Vector Launch) is evolving their Prospector 18 suborbital launch vehicle technology into an orbital nanosat launch vehicle capable of delivering a 10 kg (22 lb) payload into a 250 km (160 mi) orbit.
- Generation Orbit is developing an air-launched rocket to deliver both nanosats and sub-50 kg microsats to low Earth orbit.

Actual NS launches:

- NASA launched three satellites on 21 April 2013 based on smart phones. Two phones use the PhoneSat 1.0 specification and the third used a beta version of PhoneSat 2.0
- ISRO launched 14 nanosatellites on 22 June 2016, two for Indian universities and 12 for the United States under the Flock-2P program. This launch was performed during the PSLV-C34 mission.
- ISRO launched 103 nanosatellites on 15 February 2017. This launch was performed during the PSLV-C37 mission.

=== Picosatellites ===
The term "picosatellite" or "picosat" (not to be confused with the PicoSAT series of microsatellites) is usually applied to artificial satellites with a wet mass between 0.1 and 1 kg (0.22 and 2.2 lb), although it is sometimes used to refer to any satellite that is under 1 kg in launch mass. Again, designs and proposed designs of these types usually have multiple picosatellites working together or in formation (sometimes the term "swarm" is applied). Some designs require a larger "mother" satellite for communication with ground controllers or for launching and docking with picosatellites.

Picosatellites are emerging as a new alternative for do-it-yourself kitbuilders. Picosatellites are currently commercially available across the full range of 0.1–1 kg (0.22–2.2 lb). Launch opportunities are now available for $12,000 to $18,000 for sub-1 kg picosat payloads that are approximately the size of a soda can.

=== Femtosatellites ===
The term "femtosatellite" or "femtosat" is usually applied to artificial satellites with a wet mass below 100 g (3.5 oz). Like picosatellites, some designs require a larger "mother" satellite for communication with ground controllers.

Three prototype "chip satellites" were launched to the ISS on Space Shuttle Endeavour on its final mission in May 2011. They were attached to the ISS external platform Materials International Space Station Experiment (MISSE-8) for testing. In April 2014, the nanosatellite KickSat was launched aboard a Falcon 9 rocket with the intention of releasing 104 femtosatellite-sized chipsats, or "Sprites". In the event, they were unable to complete the deployment on time due to a failure of an onboard clock and the deployment mechanism reentered the atmosphere on 14 May 2014, without having deployed any of the 5-gram femtosats. ThumbSat is another project intending to launch femtosatellites in the late 2010s. ThumbSat announced a launch agreement with CubeSat in 2017 to launch up to 1000 of the very small satellites.

In March 2019, the CubeSat KickSat-2 deployed 105 femtosats called "ChipSats" into Earth orbit. Each of the ChipSats weighed 4 grams. The satellites were tested for 3 days, and they then reentered the atmosphere and burned up.

== Technical challenges ==
Small satellites usually require innovative propulsion, attitude control, communication and computation systems. Larger satellites usually use monopropellants or bipropellant combustion systems for propulsion and attitude control; these systems are complex and require a minimal amount of volume to surface area to dissipate heat. These systems may be used on larger small satellites, while other micro/nanosats have to use electric propulsion, compressed gas, vaporizable liquids such as butane or carbon dioxide or other innovative propulsion systems that are simple, cheap and scalable.

Small satellites can use conventional radio systems in UHF, VHF, S-band and X-band, although often miniaturized using more up-to-date technology as compared to larger satellites. Tiny satellites such as nanosats and small microsats may lack the power supply or mass for large conventional radio transponders, and various miniaturized or innovative communications systems have been proposed, such as laser receivers, antenna arrays and satellite-to-satellite communication networks. Few of these have been demonstrated in practice.Electronics need to be rigorously tested and modified to be "space hardened" or resistant to the outer space environment (vacuum, microgravity, thermal extremes, and radiation exposure). Miniaturized satellites allow for the opportunity to test new hardware with reduced expense in testing. Furthermore, since the overall cost risk in the mission is much lower, more up-to-date but less space-proven technology can be incorporated into micro and nanosats than can be used in much larger, more expensive missions with less appetite for risk.

== Collision safety ==
Small satellites are difficult to track with ground-based radar, so it is difficult to predict if they will collide with other satellites or human-occupied spacecraft. The U.S. Federal Communications Commission has rejected at least one small satellite launch request on these safety grounds.

== Commercial and rideshare capabilities ==
Historically utilized for India's national communication and meteorological satellites (such as the INSAT and GSAT series), the GSLV has undergone significant technical modifications to increase its competitiveness in the global commercial launch market. With the operational success of the indigenous Cryogenic Upper Stage (CUS), ISRO's commercial arm, NewSpace India Limited (NSIL), has begun manifesting international secondary payloads on GSLV missions.

=== Multi-Satellite Adapters and OTV Integration ===
To accommodate the growing demand for SmallSat launches, ISRO has integrated high-capacity payload fairings (specifically the 4-meter ogive version) and multi-satellite adapters on the GSLV Mk II. These systems allow the vehicle to carry several independent payloads to Geosynchronous Transfer Orbit (GTO) or Sun-synchronous orbit (SSO) in a single mission.

As part of this commercial expansion, the GSLV's mission profiles have evolved to support the integration of third-party Orbital Transfer Vehicles (OTVs). These vehicles, such as the Momentus Vigoride bus or D-Orbit's ION Satellite Carrier, are designed to interface with the GSLV's standard 937mm or 1194mm adapters. By utilizing an OTV, secondary payloads launched on the GSLV can perform autonomous proximity operations and achieve precise orbital slots that differ from the primary satellite's drop-off point, enhancing the vehicle's flexibility for "last-mile" orbital delivery.

== Commercial and rideshare capabilities ==
Historically utilized for India's national communication and meteorological satellites (such as the INSAT and GSAT series), the GSLV has undergone significant technical modifications to increase its competitiveness in the global commercial launch market. With the operational success of the indigenous Cryogenic Upper Stage (CUS), ISRO's commercial arm, NewSpace India Limited (NSIL), has begun manifesting international secondary payloads on GSLV missions.

=== Multi-Satellite Adapters and OTV Integration ===
To accommodate the growing demand for SmallSat launches, ISRO has integrated high-capacity payload fairings (specifically the 4-meter ogive version) and multi-satellite adapters on the GSLV Mk II. These systems allow the vehicle to carry several independent payloads to Geosynchronous Transfer Orbit (GTO) or Sun-synchronous orbit (SSO) in a single mission.

As part of this commercial expansion, the GSLV's mission profiles have evolved to support the integration of third-party Orbital Transfer Vehicles (OTVs). These vehicles, such as the Momentus Vigoride bus or D-Orbit's ION Satellite Carrier, are designed to interface with the GSLV's standard 937mm or 1194mm adapters. By utilizing an OTV, secondary payloads launched on the GSLV can perform autonomous proximity operations and achieve precise orbital slots that differ from the primary satellite's drop-off point, enhancing the vehicle's flexibility for "last-mile" orbital delivery.

=== Secondary Payload Manifests ===
Recent GSLV missions, including the GSLV-F14 and F15, have demonstrated the vehicle's ability to maintain high orbital injection accuracy (within ±0.1° inclination). This precision is critical for commercial customers who require "hosted payload" services, where sensors remain attached to the upper stage or an OTV for the duration of the mission to utilize the host vehicle's power and telemetry systems.

== See also ==
- Canadian Advanced Nanospace eXperiment Program
- CanSat
- DRAGONSat picosatellite
- Micro air vehicle
- N-Prize
- Nanosatellite Launch System
- Satellite formation flying
- SPHERES
- Student Space Exploration & Technology Initiative
- Hayasat-1
- University Nanosatellite Program
- AMSAT Amateur Satellite Corp.
- PocketQube
- Rocket Lab
