= SSOT =

SSOT may refer to:

- Single source of truth in information systems
- State Sponsors of Terrorism, United States Department of State designation
- SSOT (satellite), a Chilean Earth imaging satellite
