= List of military flags =

This is a list of current flags flown by the armed forces of sovereign states worldwide. The flags in this list represent either the whole national military of a given state, or a specific branch of it.

== Albania ==
Organization	Organization type	Flag	Notes
Albanian Land Forces	Army		2010–present
Albanian Naval Forces	Navy		2010–present
Albanian Air Force	Air force		2010–present

== Algeria ==
Organization	Organization type	Flag	Notes
Algerian National Navy	Navy		

== Antigua and Barbuda ==
Organization	Organization type	Flag	Notes
Antigua and Barbuda Coast Guard	Coast guard		

== Argentina ==
Organization	Organization type	Flag	Notes
Argentine National Gendarmerie	National guard		
Argentine Naval Prefecture	National coast guard		

== Australia ==
Organization	Organization type	Flag	Notes
Royal Australian Army	Army		
Royal Australian Navy	Navy		
Royal Australian Air Force	Air force		
Australian Defence Force	Military		

== Bangladesh ==
Organization	Organization type	Flag	Notes
Bangladesh Armed Forces	Military		
Bangladesh Army	Army		
Bangladesh Navy	Navy		
Bangladesh Air Force	Air force		
Bangladesh Coast Guard	Coast guard		

== Belarus ==
Organization	Organization type	Flag	Notes
Armed Forces of Belarus	Military		
Belarusian Ground Forces	Army		
Belarusian Air Force	Air force		

== Belgium ==
Organization	Organization type	Flag	In use
Belgian Land Component	Army		1982–present
Belgian Navy	Navy		
Belgian Air Component	Air force		

== Brazil ==
Organization	Organization type	Flag	In use
Brazilian Army	Army		1987–present
Brazilian Marine Corps	Marines		1931–present
Brazilian Navy	Navy		
Brazilian Air Force	Air Force		1999-present

== Canada ==
Organization	Organization type	Flag	In use
Canadian Armed Forces	Military		
Canadian Army	Army		2016–present
Royal Canadian Navy	Navy		
Royal Canadian Air Force	Air force		

Former flags

Organization	Organization type	Flag	Notes
Canadian Army	Army		1939–1944
Canadian Mobile Command / Canadian Land Force Command	Army		1968–1998
Canadian Army	Army (limited use)		2013–2016

== Colombia ==
Organization	Organization type	Flag	Notes
Colombian Armed Forces	Military		
Colombian Army	Army		
Colombian Navy	Navy		
Colombian Aerospace Force	Aerospace force		
Colombian Marine Infantry	Marines		

== People’s Republic of China ==
Organization	Organization type	Flag	Notes
People's Liberation Army	Military		
People's Liberation Army Ground Force	Army		
People's Liberation Army Navy	Navy		
People's Liberation Army Air Force	Air force		
People's Liberation Army Rocket Force	Strategic forces		
People's Armed Police	Police forces		

== Egypt ==
Organization	Organization type	Flag	Notes
Egyptian Air Defense Command	Air defence force		
Egyptian Air Force	Air force		
Egyptian Navy	Navy		
Egyptian Army	Army		

== Finland ==
Organization	Organization type	Flag	In use
Finnish Defense Forces	Military		1918–present
Finnish Navy	Navy		1918–present
Finnish Air Force	Air force		1918–present
Finnish Army	Army		1918–present
Finnish Border Guard	Border guard		1918–present

== France ==
Organization	Organization type	Flag	In use
French Defense Forces	Military		
French Navy	Navy		
French Air and Space Force	Air force		
French Army	Army		

== Estonia ==
Organization	Organization type	Flag	Notes
Estonian Defense Forces	Military		
Estonian Land Forces	Army		
Estonian Navy	Navy		

== Georgia ==
Organization	Organization type	Flag	Notes
Georgian Land Forces	Army		
Coast Guard of Georgia	Coast guard		
Aviation and Air Defense command	Air force		

Former flags

Organization	Organization type	Flag	Used
Georgian Navy	Navy		2004–2009
Georgian Navy	Navy		1997–2004
Georgian Air Force	Air force		2004–2010

== Germany ==
Organization	Organization type	Flag	Notes
Bundeswehr	Military		
German Army	Army		
German Navy	Navy		
German Air Force	Air force		

Former flags

Organization	Organization type	Flag	Notes
Wehrmacht	Military		1938–1945
Heer	Army		
Kriegsmarine	Navy		

== Hungary ==
Organization	Organization type	Flag	Notes
Hungarian Defence Forces	Military		
Hungarian Ground Forces	Army		
Hungarian River Guard	Navy		
Hungarian Air Force	Air Force		

== India ==
Organization	Organization type	Flag	Notes
Indian Armed Forces	Military		
Indian Army	Army		
Indian Navy	Navy		
Indian Air Force	Air force		
Indian Coast Guard	Coast guard		

Former flags

Organization	Organization type	Flag	Notes
British Indian Army	Army		
Royal Indian Navy	Navy		
Royal Indian Air Force	Air force		

== Indonesia ==
Organization	Organization type	Flag	Notes
Indonesian National Armed Forces	Military		
Indonesian Army	Army		
Indonesian Air Force	Air Force		
Indonesian Navy	Navy		

== Iran ==
Organization	Organization type	Flag	Notes
Islamic Republic of Iran Army	Military		
Islamic Republic of Iran Army Ground Forces	Army		
Islamic Republic of Iran Air Force	Air force		
Islamic Republic of Iran Navy	Navy		

== Iraq ==
Organization	Organization type	Flag	Notes
Iraqi Army	Army		
Iraqi Navy	Navy		

Former flags

Organization	Organization type	Flag	In use
Iraqi Navy	Navy		Until 2003

== Ireland ==
Organization	Organization type	Flag	Notes
Irish Defence Forces	Military		
Irish Naval Service	Navy		
Irish Air Corps	Air force		

== Israel ==
Organization	Organization type	Flag	In use
Israel Defense Forces	Military		1949–present
Israeli Navy	Navy		1948–present
Israeli Air Force	Air force		1991–present
Israeli Ground Forces	Ground forces		2021-present

== Italy ==
Organization	Organization type	Flag	In use
Italian Navy	Navy		

== Japan ==
Organization	Organization type	Flag	In use
Japan Self-Defense Forces and Japan Ground Self-Defense Force	Military and ground forces		1954–present
Japan Maritime Self-Defense Force	Navy		1954–present
Japan Air Self-Defense Force	Air force		1972–present
Japan Space Operations Squadron	Space force		2020–present

== Jordan ==
Organization	Organization type	Flag	Notes
Royal Jordanian Army	Ground forces		
Royal Naval Force	Navy		
Royal Jordanian Air Force	Air force		

== Kenya ==
Organization	Organization type	Flag	Notes
Kenya Defence Forces	Military		
Kenya Army	Ground forces		
Kenya Navy	Navy		
Kenya Air Force	Air force		

== Korea (North) ==
Organization	Organization type	Flag	Notes
Korean People's Army	Military		Flag is two-sided; obverse shown.
Korean People's Army Ground Force	Ground forces		Flag is two-sided; obverse shown.
Korean People's Navy	Navy		Flag is two-sided; obverse shown.
Korean People's Air Force	Air force		Flag is two-sided; obverse shown.
Korean People's Army Strategic Force	Strategic force		Flag is two-sided; obverse shown.
Korean People's Army Special Operation Force	Special force		Flag is two-sided; obverse shown.

Former flags

Organization	Organization type	Flag	In use
Korean People's Army	Military		1948
Korean People's Army	Military		1948–1961
Korean People's Army	Military		1961–1992
Korean People's Army	Military		1992–1993
Korean People's Army Ground Force	Ground force		1993–2023
Korean People's Navy	Navy		1993–2023
Korean People's Air Force	Air force		1993–2023
Korean People's Army Strategic Force	Strategic force		2018–2020
Korean People's Army Special Operation Force	Special force		2018–2020

== Korea (South) ==
Organization	Organization type	Flag	In use
Republic of Korea Armed Forces	Military		
Republic of Korea Army	Ground forces		
Republic of Korea Navy	Navy		1955–present
Republic of Korea Air Force	Air force		
Republic of Korea Marine Corps	Naval infantry (subordinate unit of the navy)		

== Lithuania ==
Organization	Organization type	Flag	Notes
Lithuanian Armed Forces	Military		
Lithuanian Army	Ground forces		
Lithuanian Air Force	Air force		
Lithuanian Navy	Navy		

== Malaysia ==
Organization	Organization type	Flags	Notes
Malaysian Army	Ground forces		
Royal Malaysian Navy	Navy		
Royal Malaysian Air Force	Air force		

== Mexico ==
Organization	Organization type	Flag	Notes
Mexican Army	Ground forces		
Mexican Navy	Navy		
Mexican Air Force	Air force		
Mexican Maritime Search and Rescue	Coast guard		
Mexican Naval Infantry Corps	Naval infantry		
Mexican Maritime Search and Rescue	Coast guard		

== Mongolia ==
Organization	Organization type	Flag	Notes
Mongolian Armed Forces	Military		
Mongolian Ground Force	Ground forces		

== Morocco ==
Organization	Organization type	Flag	Notes
Royal Moroccan Navy	Navy		
Royal Moroccan Air Force	Air force		

== Myanmar (Burma) ==
Organization	Organization type	Flag	Notes
Myanmar Armed Forces (Tatmadaw)	Military		
Myanmar Army	Army		
Myanmar Air Force	Air force		
Myanmar Navy	Navy		

== Maldives ==
Organization	Organization type	Flag	Notes
Maldives National Defence Force	Military		
MNDF Coast Guard	Coast Guard		
MNDF Marine Corps	Marines		
MNDF Air Corps	Air Force		

== Namibia ==
Organization	Organization type	Flag	Notes
Namibian Defense Force	Military		
Namibian Army	Army		
Namibian Air Force	Air force		
Namibian Navy	Navy		

== Netherlands ==
Organization	Organization type	Flag	Notes
Royal Netherlands Army	Army		
Royal Netherlands Navy	Navy		
Royal Netherlands Air Force	Air force		
Royal Marechaussee	gendarmerie force/military police		

== New Zealand ==
Organization	Organization type	Flag	Notes
Royal New Zealand Navy	Navy		
Royal New Zealand Air Force	Air force		

== Nigeria ==
Organization	Organization type	Flag	Notes
Nigerian Armed Forces	Military		
Nigerian Army	Ground forces		
Nigerian Navy	Navy		
Nigerian Air Force	Air force		

== Norway ==
Organization	Organization type	Flag	Notes
Norwegian Army	Army		
Royal Norwegian Navy	Navy		
Royal Norwegian Air Force	Air force		

== Pakistan ==
Organization	Organization type	Flag	Notes
Pakistan Armed Forces	Military		
Pakistan Army	Ground forces		
Pakistan Navy	Navy		
Pakistan Air Force	Air force		
Pakistan Coast Guards	Coast guard		

== Peru ==
Organization	Organization type	Flag	Notes
Peruvian Army	Ground forces		
Peruvian Navy	Navy		
Peruvian Air Force	Air force		

== Philippines ==
Organization	Organization type	Flag	Notes
Philippine Armed Forces	Military		
Philippine Army	Ground forces		
Philippine Navy	Navy		
Philippine Air Force	Air force		
Philippine Marine Corps	Naval infantry (subordinate unit of the navy)		

== Poland ==
Organization	Organization type	Flag	Notes
Polish Land Forces	Ground forces		
Polish Navy	Navy		
Polish Air Force	Air force		
Polish Special Forces	Special forces		

== Russia ==
Organization	Organization type	Flag	In use
Armed Forces of the Russian Federation	Military		
Russian Ground Forces	Army		
Russian Aerospace Forces	Air force		
Russian Navy	Navy		
Russian Airborne Troops	Airborne forces (subordinate branch of the air force)		
Strategic Rocket Forces	Strategic forces (subordinate branch of the army)		
Russian National Guard	Republican guard		2016–present

Former flags

Organization	Organization Type	Flag	In Use
Soviet Army	Army		1950s-1991
Soviet Navy	Navy		1950-1991
Soviet Air Forces	Air Force		1924-1991

== Saudi Arabia ==
Organization	Organization type	Flag	Notes
Armed Forces of Saudi Arabia	Military		
Saudi Arabian Army	Ground forces		
Royal Saudi Air	Air force		
Royal Saudi Navy	Navy		
Royal Saudi Air Defense	Air defense force		
Royal Saudi Strategic Missile	Strategic forces		
Saudi Arabian National Guard	National guard		
Saudi Arabian Border Guards	Border guards		
Saudi Royal Guard Regiment	Royal guard regiment		

== Serbia ==
Organization	Organization type	Flag	Notes
Serbian Armed Forces	Military		
Serbian Army	Ground forces		
Serbian Air Force	Air force		
Serbian River Flotilla	Navy		Subordinate unit of the army.

Former flags

Organization	Organization type	Flag	In use
Federal Yugoslav Navy / Serbia and Montenegro Navy	Navy		1992–2006

== Slovenia ==
Organization	Organization type	Flag	In use
Slovenian Armed Forces	Military		
Slovenian Navy	Navy		1996–present

== Somalia ==
Organization	Organization type	Flag	In use
Somali Armed Forces	Military		1960–present
Somali Navy	Navy		1960–present
Somali Air Force	Air Force		1960–present
Somali Police Force	Police		1960–present

== South Africa ==
Organization	Organization type	Flag	In use
South African National Defence Force	Military		2003–present
South African Army	Ground forces		2003–present
South African Air Force	Air force		2003–present
South African Navy	Navy		1994–present

Former flags

Organization	Organization type	Flag	Notes
South African National Defence Force	Military		1994–2003
South African Defence Force	Military		1981–1994
Union Defence Force / South African Defence Force	Military		1947–1981
South African Army	Ground forces		2002–2003
South African Army	Ground forces		1994–2002
South African Army	Ground forces		1973–1994
South African Army	Ground forces		1966–1973
South African Army	Ground forces		1951–1966
South African Air Force	Air force		1994–2003
South African Air Force	Air force		1982–1994
South African Air Force	Air force		1981–1982
South African Air Force	Air force		1967–1970
South African Air Force	Air force		1958–1967, 1970–1981
South African Air Force	Air force		1951–1958
South African Air Force	Air force		1940–1951
South African Air Force	Air force		1920–1940
South African Navy	Navy		1981–1994
South African Navy	Navy		1959–1981
South African Navy	Navy		1952–1959
South African Navy	Navy		1951–1952 (approved but not used)
South African Navy	Navy		1946–1951
South African Navy	Navy		1922–1946

== Sri Lanka ==
Organization	Organization type	Flag	In use
Sri Lanka Army	Ground forces		1972–present
Sri Lanka Navy	Navy		1972–present
Sri Lanka Air Force	Air Force		2000–present

== Sweden ==
Organization	Organization type	Flag	In use
Swedish Armed Forces	Military		
Swedish Navy	Navy		

== China (Republic of) ==
Organization	Organization type	Flag	Notes
Republic of China Army	Ground forces		
Republic of China Navy	Navy		
Republic of China Marine Corps	Naval infantry		
Republic of China Air Force	Air force		

== Thailand ==
Organization	Organization type	Flag	In use
Royal Thai Armed Forces	Military		1979–present
Royal Thai Army	Army		1979–present
Royal Thai Navy	Navy		1979–present
Royal Thai Air Force	Air force		1979–present

== Turkmenistan ==
Organization	Organization type	Flag	Notes
Turkmen Ground Forces	Army		
Turkmen Air Force	Air force		
Turkmen Naval Forces	Navy		

== Turkey ==
Organization	Organization type	Flag	Notes
Turkish Land Forces	Army		Rank flag of the Commander of the Turkish Land Forces
Turkish Air Force	Air force		Rank flag of the Commander of the Turkish Air Force
Turkish Naval Forces	Navy		Rank flag of the Commander of the Turkish Naval Forces

== United Arab Emirates ==
Organization	Organization type	Flag	In use
UAE Armed Forces	Military		
United Arab Emirates Air Force	Air force		
UAE Army	Army		

== Ukraine ==
Organization	Organization type	Flag	Notes
Ukrainian Armed Forces	Military	Raspberry color field with Armed Forces logo in the center.	2009–present
Ukrainian Ground Forces	Army	Raspberry color field with Ground Forces logo in the center.	2009–present
Ukrainian Air Force	Air force	Blue field with Air Force logo in the center.	2009–present
National Guard of Ukraine	Gendarmerie	Blue field with National Guard logo in the center.	2014–present
Ukrainian Security Service	Security forces	Raspberry color field with Security Service logo in the center.	2002–present
Ukrainian Navy	Navy	Blue cross on a white field with a Ukrainian flag in the canton.	2009–present
Sea Guard	Coast guard	Green cross with a miniature Ukrainian flag in the upper left corner.	2001–present

== United Kingdom ==
Organization	Organization type	Flag	Notes
British Army	Army		1938–present
Royal Navy	Navy		1864–present
Royal Air Force	Air force		
Royal Marines	Marines		
Royal Engineers	Engineers (subordinate branch of the army)		

== United States ==
Organization	Organization type	Flag	In use
United States Army	Army		1956–present
United States Navy	Navy		1959–present
United States Air Force	Air force		1951–present
United States Marine Corps	Marines		1939–present
United States Coast Guard	Coast guard		1964–present
United States Space Force	Space force		2019–present

Former flags

Organization	Organization type	Flag	In use
United States Marine Corps	Marines		1914–1939
United States Navy	Navy		1864–1959

== Uruguay ==
Organization	Organization type	Flag	Notes
Uruguayan National Army	Army		
Uruguayan Air Force	Air force		
Uruguayan National Navy	Navy		Also used as Naval Jack

== Uzbekistan ==
Organization	Organization Type	Flag	Notes
Armed Forces of the Republic of Uzbekistan	Military		Also this flag used Ministry of Defense
Uzbek Ground Forces	Army		
Uzbekistan Air and Air Defense Forces	Air Force		
Uzbek River Force	Navy		

== Venezuela ==
Organization	Organization type	Flag	Notes
Bolivarian Navy of Venezuela	Navy		
National Army of the Bolivarian Republic of Venezuela	Army		
Venezuelan National Bolivarian Military Aviation	Air force		
Bolivarian National Guard of Venezuela	National guard		
National Bolivarian Militia of Venezuela	Republican guard		

== Vietnam ==
Organization	Organization type	Flag	Notes
Vietnam People's Army	Military		
Vietnam People's Ground Force	Army		
Vietnam People's Air Force	Air force		
Vietnam People's Navy	Navy		
Vietnam People's Navy	Navy		Naval ensign
Vietnam Border Guard	Border guard		
Vietnam Coast Guard	Coast guard		

Former flags

Organization	Organization type	Flag	In use
Republic of Vietnam Military Forces	Military		1955–1975
Army of the Republic of Vietnam	Army		Until 1975
Republic of Vietnam Air Force	Air force		Until 1975
Republic of Vietnam Navy	Navy		Until 1975
Republic of Vietnam Marine Division	Marines (subordinate branch of the navy)		1968–1975

== See also ==
- Military colours, standards and guidons
