= CERES (satellite) =

French military satellite program

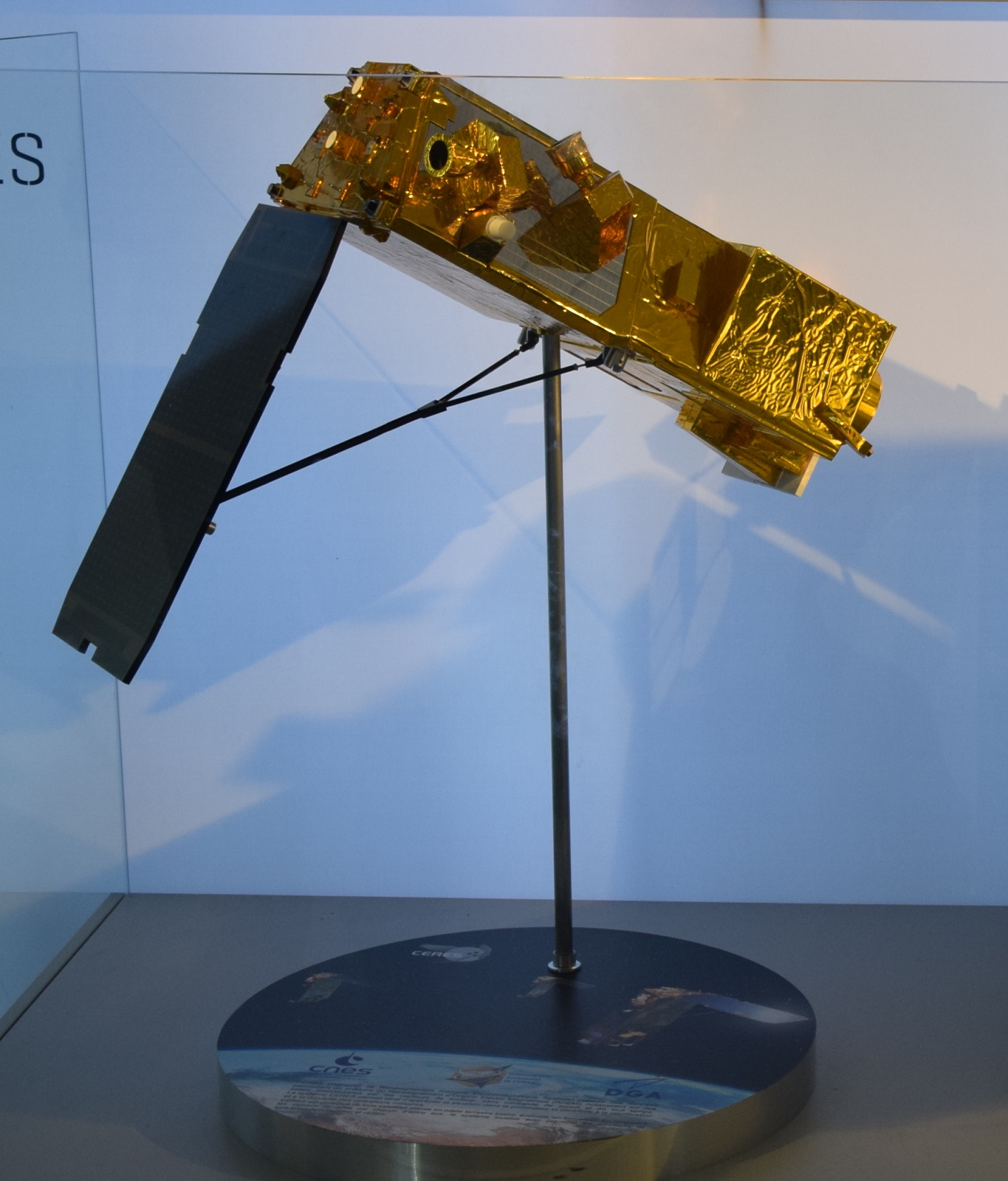
- CERES satellite
- Mission type: SIGINT
- Operator: CNES / DGA
- COSPAR ID: 2021-105A; 2021-105B; 2021-105C
- SATCAT no.: 49464; 49465; 49466

Spacecraft properties
- Bus: EliteBus
- Manufacturer: Thales Alenia Space (bus), Airbus Defence and Space (payload)
- Launch mass: 516 kg (1,138 lb) (each)

Start of mission
- Launch date: 16 November 2021, 09:27:55 UTC
- Rocket: Vega VV20
- Launch site: Centre Spatial Guyanais, Kourou, ELA-1
- Contractor: Arianespace

Orbital parameters
- Reference system: Geocentric orbit
- Regime: Semi-synchronous orbit
- Perigee altitude: 669 km (416 mi)
- Apogee altitude: 672 km (418 mi)
- Inclination: 75.00°
- Period: 90.00 minutes

CERES (CapacitÉ de Renseignement Électromagnétique Spatiale) is a French space-based electronic surveillance constellation designed to collect intelligence of electromagnetic origins anywhere in the world. Consisting of three formation-flying satellites, it was developed by Airbus Defence and Space and Thales Alenia Space under the management of the CNES for the French defence procurement agency (DGA).

Launched in November 2021, the satellites are expected to reach their final orbit, 700 km from Earth, after a few months and full operational capability by the end of 2022. Their purpose is to allow France to gather data that was previously inaccessible from land, sea, or airborne sensors, and for the French military to more quickly and effectively adapt to new operational scenarios. An all-weather system operational 24/7, the CERES constellation is notably capable of tracking, identifying and mapping enemy radars, air defenses and command centers.

The CERES replaced the ELISA demonstrator, a cluster of four satellites that were deorbited in the summer of 2021 after ten years of service.

== History ==
The collection of electromagnetic intelligence is a strategic tool for France. In order to master this technology, CNES has developed and launched the Essaim and ELISA. These demonstrators set the framework for an operational program called CERES. Like its predecessors, CERES is made up of satellites flying in formation (in close proximity to each other). It can pick up electromagnetic signals on the ground and is able to triangulate the position of transmitters, making the 3 satellites capable of detecting, locating and characterizing radar and telecommunication transmitters. Airbus Defence and Space is responsible for the integration of the complete system and the space segment comprising the three satellites, while Thales is responsible for the entire mission chain and system performance, from the onboard payload to the user ground segment. In addition, Thales Alenia Space has provided Airbus with the satellite platforms. The program cost is estimated at €450 million.

The three satellites forming CERES were to be placed in orbit in 2020 by a Vega rocket, which was ordered from Arianespace in January 2016. However, following an anomaly on a casing, which led to some additional work, it was announced in October 2019 that the launch of a first satellite scheduled for 2020 would be postponed to 2021. The launch took place on 16 November 2021, at 09:27:55 UTC, onboard of the Vega flight VV20, with all 3 satellites being sent instead of one. Full operational capability is expected to be reached by the end of 2022 but it was reported they were used operationally for the first time in spring 2022 in the context of the Russian invasion of Ukraine.

== See also ==
- Essaim
- ELISA
- Clouds and the Earth's Radiant Energy System (CERES) satellites
