= Space Operations Command (Italy) =

Italian Space Operations Command
- Comando delle Operazioni Spaziali
- Active: 2020 – present
- Country: Italy
- Branch: Ministry of Defence
- Type: Joint space command
- Role: Space warfare
- Part of: Joint Operations Command
- Garrison/HQ: Rome
- Motto: Hic sunt leones ("Here be lions")

Commanders
- Current commander: Gen. B. Luca Monaco

The Italian Space Operations Command (Italian: Comando delle Operazioni Spaziali, COS) is the joint space command of the Italian Armed Forces. It was established in 2020.

== History ==
At the end of 2019, the General Office for Space was established within the Defence Staff. In June 2020, the Space Operation Command was officially founded and General Luca Capasso was appointed at its head.

The Space Operation Command operates military satellites of Italy, such as Sicral 1B, Sicral 2, Athena-Fidus, OPTSAT-3000 and the COSMO-SkyMed. It is also working together with the Italian Navy to convert the aircraft carrier Giuseppe Garibaldi, which was expected to be dismantled in 2022, into a rocket launch platform.

== Commanders ==
- Gen. B. A. Luca Capasso (June 2020 - May 2022)
- Gen. B. Luca Monaco (May 2022 - )

== See also ==
- Italian Armed Forces
- Italian Air Force
- Italian Space Agency
