= TechSat-21 =

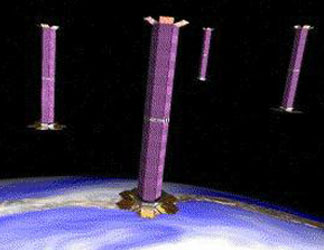
- Artist's rendition
- Mission type: Technology
- Operator: AFRL, STP, NASA

Spacecraft properties
- Manufacturer: MicroSat Systems
- Launch mass: 181 kilograms (399 lb)

Start of mission
- Launch date: Not launched
- Rocket: Atlas V 401
- Launch site: Cape Canaveral SLC-41

Orbital parameters
- Reference system: Geocentric
- Regime: Low Earth
- Perigee altitude: 560 kilometers (350 mi)
- Apogee altitude: 560 kilometers (350 mi)
- Inclination: 35.4& degrees
- Epoch: Planned

TechSat-21 (Technology Satellite of the 21st Century) was a small spacecraft developed by the U.S. Air Force Research Laboratory's Space Vehicles Directorate to test technology for formation flight of spacecraft which can rapidly change formation based on mission requirements. The project was canceled in 2003 due to numerous cost overruns.
