= MICROSCOPE =

Satellite for testing the principle of equivalence (2016–18)

- Mission type: Physics
- Operator: CNES
- COSPAR ID: 2016-025B
- SATCAT no.: 41457
- Website: https://microscope.cnes.fr/en/
- Mission duration: Planned: 2 years Final: 2 years, 5 months, 22 days

Spacecraft properties
- Bus: Myriade
- Manufacturer: CNES · Airbus
- Launch mass: 330 kg (728 lb)
- Dimensions: 138 × 104 × 158 cm (54 × 41 × 62 in)
- Power: 140 watts

Start of mission
- Launch date: 25 April 2016, 21:02:13 UTC
- Rocket: Soyuz ST-A (VS-14)
- Launch site: Guiana Space Centre ELS
- Contractor: Arianespace
- Entered service: 2 May 2016

End of mission
- Disposal: Decommissioned
- Deactivated: c. 18 October 2018

Orbital parameters
- Reference system: Geocentric
- Regime: Low Earth
- Semi-major axis: 7,090.9 km (4,406.1 mi)
- Eccentricity: 0.000167
- Perigee altitude: 711.6 km (442.2 mi)
- Apogee altitude: 713.9 km (443.6 mi)
- Inclination: 98.23°
- Period: 99.03 minutes
- Epoch: 5 December 2016, 21:17:20 UTC
Instruments
- T-SAGE: Twin-Space Accelerometer for Gravity Experiment
- DFACS: Drag-Free Attitude Control System
- CGPS: Cold Gas Propulsion System

The Micro-Satellite à traînée Compensée pour l'Observation du Principe d'Equivalence (Micro-Satellite with Compensated Drag for Observing the Principle of Equivalence, MICROSCOPE) is a 300-kilogram (660 lb) class minisatellite operated by CNES to test the universality of free fall (the equivalence principle) with a precision to the order of 10^{−15}, 100 times more precise than can be achieved on Earth. It was launched on 25 April 2016 alongside Sentinel-1B and other small satellites, and was decommissioned around 18 October 2018 after completion of its science objectives. The final report was published in 2022.

== Experiment ==
To test the equivalence principle (i.e. the similarity of free fall for two bodies of different composition in an identical gravity field), two differential accelerometers are used successively. If the equivalence principle is verified, the two sets of masses will be subjected to the same acceleration. If different accelerations have to be applied, the principle will be violated.

The principal experiment is the Twin-Space Accelerometer for Gravity Experiment (T-SAGE), built by ONERA and composed of two identical accelerometers and their associated, concentric cylindrical masses. One accelerometer serves as a reference and contains two platinum-rhodium alloy masses, while the other is the test instrument and contains two masses with different neutron–proton ratios: one mass of platinum-rhodium alloy and another mass of titanium-aluminium-vanadium alloy (TA6V). The masses are maintained within their test areas by electrostatic repulsion, designed to render them motionless with respect to the satellite.

It is necessary to create a thermally benign environment for the accelerometers. To that end, a Sun-synchronous orbit provides constant illumination; the experiments are mounted on the end of the satellite bus away from the Sun; and to maintain thermal isolation from the satellite itself, the modes of thermal connection were modelled and wire connections were minimised.

== Satellite control ==
The satellite employs a Drag-Free Attitude Control System (DFACS), also called the Acceleration and Attitude Control System (AACS), that uses a double-redundant primary and backup set of four microthrusters (sixteen total) to "fly" the satellite around the test masses. This system takes into account the dynamic forces acting on the spacecraft, including aerodynamic forces due to residual atmosphere, solar pressure forces due to photon impacts, electromagnetic forces within the Earth's magnetosphere, and gravitational forces in the Sun-Earth-Moon system.

== Launch ==
MICROSCOPE was successfully launched on 25 April 2016 at 21:02:13 UTC from the Guiana Space Centre outside Kourou, French Guiana. It was carried by a Soyuz ST-A booster with a Fregat-M upper stage. Other payloads on this flight were the European Space Agency's Sentinel-1B Earth observation satellite and three CubeSats: OUFTI-1 from the University of Liège, e-st@r-II from the Polytechnic University of Turin, and AAUSAT-4 from Aalborg University.

== Results ==
On 4 December 2017, the first results were published. The equivalence principle was measured to hold true within a precision of 10^{−15}, improving prior measurements by an order of magnitude.

== End of mission ==
After completing its mission goals and exhausting its supply of nitrogen fuel, the decommissioning of MICROSCOPE was announced on 18 October 2018. The spacecraft was first passivated, then two 4.5-metre (15 ft) IDEAS (Innovative DEorbiting Aerobrake System) inflatable booms were deployed to passively de-orbit the spacecraft by creating a higher drag profile. By these means MICROSCOPE is expected to re-enter Earth's atmosphere within 25 instead of 73 years.

== See also ==
- Tests of general relativity
- Timeline of gravitational physics and relativity
