= Value-driven design =

Systems engineering strategy

Value-driven design (VDD) is a systems engineering strategy based on microeconomics which enables multidisciplinary design optimization. Value-driven design is being developed by the American Institute of Aeronautics and Astronautics, through a program committee of government, industry and academic representatives. In parallel, the U.S. Defense Advanced Research Projects Agency has promulgated an identical strategy, calling it value-centric design, on the F6 Program. At this point, the terms value-driven design and value-centric design are interchangeable. The essence of these strategies is that design choices are made to maximize system value rather than to meet performance requirements.

This is also similar to the value-driven approach of agile software development where a project's stakeholders prioritise their high-level needs (or system features) based on the perceived business value each would deliver.

Value-driven design is controversial because performance requirements are a central element of systems engineering. However, value-driven design supporters claim that it can improve the development of large aerospace systems by reducing or eliminating cost overruns which are a major problem, according to independent auditors.

== Concept ==
Value-driven design creates an environment that enables and encourages design optimization by providing designers with an objective function and eliminating those constraints which have been expressed as performance requirements. The objective function inputs all the important attributes of the system being designed, and outputs a score. The higher the score, the better the design. Describing an early version of what is now called value-driven design, George Hazelrigg said, "The purpose of this framework is to enable the assessment of a value for every design option so that options can be rationally compared and a choice taken." At the whole system level, the objective function which performs this assessment of value is called a "value model." The value model distinguishes value-driven design from Multi-Attribute Utility Theory applied to design. Whereas in Multi-Attribute Utility Theory, an objective function is constructed from stakeholder assessments, value-driven design employs economic analysis to build a value model. The basis for the value model is often an expression of profit for a business, but economic value models have also been developed for other organizations, such as government.

To design a system, engineers first take system attributes that would traditionally be assigned performance requirements, like the range and fuel consumption of an aircraft, and build a system value model that uses all these attributes as inputs. Next, the conceptual design is optimized to maximize the output of the value model. Then, when the system is decomposed into components, an objective function for each component is derived from the system value model through a sensitivity analysis.

A workshop exercise implementing value-driven design for a GPS satellite was conducted in 2006, and may serve as an example of the process.

== History ==
The dichotomy between designing to performance requirements versus objective functions was raised by Herbert Simon in an essay called "The Science of Design" in 1969. Simon played both sides, saying that, ideally, engineered systems should be optimized according to an objective function, but realistically this is often too hard, so that attributes would need to be satisficed, which amounted to setting performance requirements. But he included optimization techniques in his recommended curriculum for engineers, and endorsed "utility theory and statistical decision theory as a logical framework for rational choice among given alternatives".

Utility theory was given most of its current mathematical formulation by von Neumann and Morgenstern, but it was the economist Kenneth Arrow who proved the Expected Utility Theorem most broadly, which says in essence that, given a choice among a set of alternatives, one should choose the alternative that provides the greatest probabilistic expectation of utility, where utility is value adjusted for risk aversion.

Ralph Keeney and Howard Raiffa extended utility theory in support of decision making, and Keeney developed the idea of a value model to encapsulate the calculation of utility. Keeney and Raiffa also used "attributes" to describe the inputs to an evaluation process or value model.

George Hazelrigg put engineering design, business plan analysis, and decision theory together for the first time in a framework in a paper written in 1995, which was published in 1998. Meanwhile, Paul Collopy independently developed a similar framework in 1997, and Harry Cook developed the S-Model for incorporating product price and demand into a profit-based objective function for design decisions.

The MIT Engineering Systems Division produced a series of papers from 2000 on, many co-authored by Daniel Hastings, in which many utility formulations were used to address various forms of uncertainty in making engineering design decisions. Saleh et al. is a good example of this work.

The term value-driven design was coined by James Sturges at Lockheed Martin while he was organizing a workshop that would become the Value-Driven Design Program Committee at the American Institute of Aeronautics and Astronautics (AIAA) in 2006. Meanwhile, value centric design was coined independently by Owen Brown and Paul Eremenko of DARPA in the Phase 1 Broad Agency Announcement for the DARPA F6 satellite design program in 2007. Castagne et al. provides an example where value-driven design was used to design fuselage panels for a regional jet.

== Value-based acquisition ==
Implementation of value-driven design on large government systems, such as NASA or European Space Agency spacecraft or weapon systems, will require a government acquisition system that directs or incentivizes the contractor to employ a value model. Such a system is proposed in some detail in an essay by Michael Lippitz, Sean O'Keefe, and John White. They suggest that "A program office can offer a contract in which price is a function of value", where the function is derived from a value model. The price function is structured so that, in optimizing the product design in accordance with the value model, the contractor will maximize its own profit. They call this system Value Based Acquisition.

== See also ==
- Systems engineering
- Decision theory
- Multidisciplinary optimization
