= SSOT (satellite) =

Chilean earth observation satellite

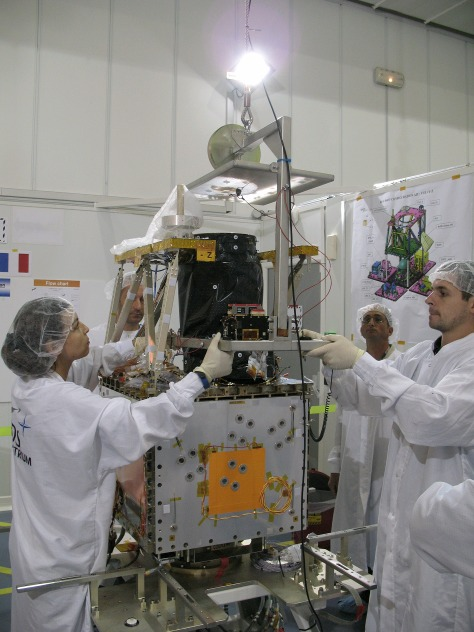
- Mission type: Earth imaging
- Operator: FACh
- COSPAR ID: 2011-076E
- SATCAT no.: 38011

Spacecraft properties
- Bus: Myriade
- Manufacturer: Airbus (formerly Astrium)
- Launch mass: 117 kilograms (258 lb)

Start of mission
- Launch date: 17 December 2011, 02:03:48 UTC
- Rocket: Soyuz-STA/Fregat
- Launch site: Kourou ELS
- Contractor: Arianespace

Orbital parameters
- Reference system: Geocentric
- Regime: Low Earth
- Perigee altitude: 629 kilometres (391 mi)
- Apogee altitude: 630 kilometres (390 mi)
- Inclination: 97.88 degrees
- Period: 97.17 minutes
- Epoch: 25 January 2015, 03:18:11 UTC

The Satellite System for Terrestrial Observation, Sistema Satelital para Observación de la Tierra (SSOT), also known as FASat-Charlie, is a Chilean satellite which was launched on December 16, 2011. The objective of the SSOT is to have a satellite system for the observation of Earth based on international cooperation.

The project was commissioned by the Ministry of Defense from the European space manufacturer EADS Astrium - based in Toulouse, France - and had an acquisition cost of 72.5 million dollars, according to the contract signed on July 25, 2008. The Soyuz rocket was used to put the satellite into orbit, which was launched in French Guiana from the spaceport of Kourou, currently used by the European Space Agency.

SSOT is a Miniaturized satellite built on the Myriade satellite bus by Astrium (now Airbus). It was part of a six-satellite payload along with Pléiades-HR 1, ELISA 1, ELISA 2, ELISA 3 and ELISA 4.

== Background ==
Prior to FASat-Charlie, Chile had two experiences with microsatellites. The first, FASat-Alfa, was launched on August 31, 1995. It did not manage to separate from its mother satellite, the Ukrainian Sich-1, and so the two remain in orbit. The failure was caused by a fault in the pyrotechnic system that allowed the separation and rupture of the spring that joined the two parts, and both are still monitored by NORAD. Three years after the initial failed attempt, FASat-Bravo launched. It became the first artificial Chilean satellite to orbit the Earth independently. In the third year of life, this satellite became inoperative due to power system failures that stopped its batteries from charging, and it became space junk.

== Function and Design ==
=== Civil Applications ===
According to a report carried out by national specialists, around 180 civil applications have been identified for the satellite relating to agriculture: precision agriculture, forestry, land use planning, mapping of urban areas, growth studies and land use, population dynamics, biomass from forestry, forest cadastres, border protection and monitoring of major works or catastrophes. From the captured images, urban growth, connectivity, tourism, forestry, environmental protection and agriculture can be regulated.

=== Design ===
FASat-Charlie is a small satellite made of silicon carbide, a material as hard as sapphire and less deformed than steel.

- Mass : 116 kilograms
- Speed : 7.5 kilometres per second .
- Telescope : It has a ground resolution of 1.45 m in panchromatic and 5.8 m in multispectral (visible and NIR spectrum). It delivers around 100 images per day, with a frequency of 3 days in a polar orbit, at a distance of 620 kilometres high.
- Expected operational life : ≥ 5 years

== See also ==
- 2011 in spaceflight
- FASat-Alfa
