= Paul Eremenko =

Technology executive

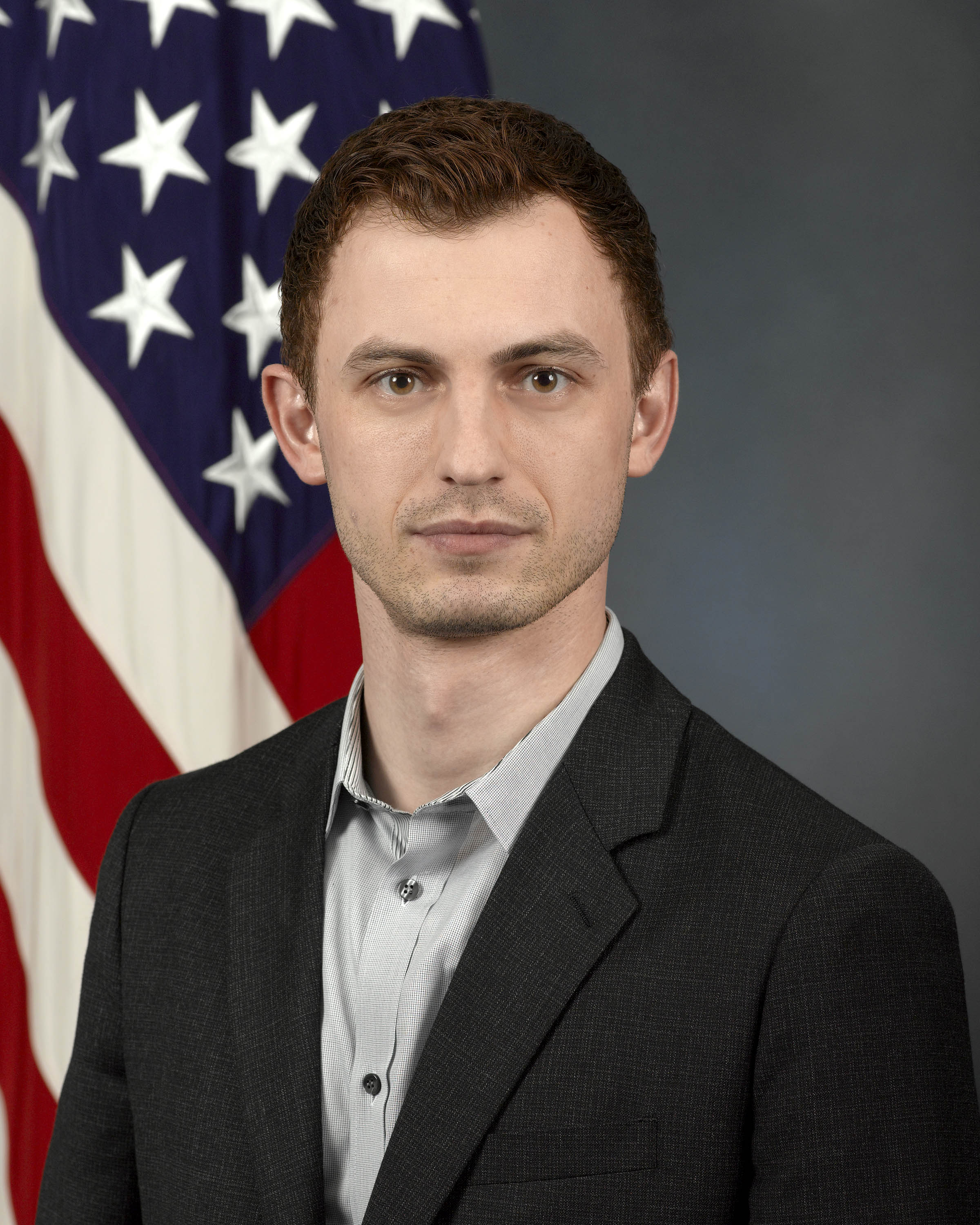
- Born: Pavlo Oleksandrovych Eremenko; 1979 (age 46–47); Lviv, Ukrainian SSR, Soviet Union (now Ukraine)
- Education: B.S. (aeronautics and astronautics), Massachusetts Institute of Technology. M.S. (aeronautics), California Institute of Technology. J.D. (law), Georgetown University.
- Occupations: Aerospace, Technology
- Years active: 2001–present
- Known for: Founding CEO of Airbus Silicon Valley Innovation Center; Project Ara at Google; DARPA; Adaptive Vehicle Make; Fractionated Spacecraft; Value-driven design 100 Year Starship
- Title: Former Chief Technology Officer of United Technologies Corporation

Paul Eremenko (born 1979, born Pavlo Oleksandrovych Eremenko) (Note: Ukrainian: Павло Олександрович Єременко, romanized: Pavlo Oleksandrovych Yeremenko) is a Ukrainian American innovator and technology executive. He was formerly the chief technology officer and senior vice president of United Technologies Corporation. Earlier, he served as the CTO of Airbus, and former CEO of Airbus Silicon Valley innovation center. He is a former Google executive and head of Google's Project Ara, an effort to create an open, modular smartphone platform. Eremenko was named one of the Top-10 Tech Leaders of 2015 in FORTUNE Magazine. Eremenko has also come out as a strong proponent of artificial intelligence and autonomy research. Eremenko has cited his desire to build a starship as the motivation underpinning his career.

== Early life ==
Eremenko was born in Lviv, Ukraine. His father is the Ukrainian mathematician Alexandre Eremenko. When he was 13, he and his parents emigrated to the United States.

== Education ==
Eremenko earned a bachelor's degree in Aeronautics and Astronautics from MIT, a Master's in Aeronautics from Caltech, and a J.D. degree from Georgetown University Law Center. He trained as a pilot at Aretz Airport near Purdue University.

== Career ==
=== Universal Hydrogen ===
On 23 September 2020, Eremenko announced Universal Hydrogen, a new business venture in aviation conversion systems for hydrogen fuel cells.

=== United Technologies Corporation ===
On 30 November 2017, Eremenko was named Senior Vice President and Chief Technology Officer, effective 1 January 2018. Eremenko will provide strategic leadership for the company's research, engineering and development activities in the global aerospace and building systems industries. He will also oversee the United Technologies Research Center. On 18 September 2019, he decided to leave UTC to pursue new opportunities.

=== Airbus Group ===
On 29 May 2015, Eremenko was named the founding CEO of Airbus Group Silicon Valley technology and business innovation center. In this capacity, he was responsible for establishing Airbus's Silicon Valley presence. Eremenko became Airbus Group CTO in July 2016 and left Airbus on 31 December 2017 citing pressures on his work-family life balance.

=== Google ===
At Google, Eremenko created and headed Project Ara, which seeks to democratize the mobile phone hardware ecosystem and to make the mobile internet accessible to the next five billion people. The project is also developing a production 3D printer to enable aesthetic customization of the modules that form the device. The ATAP division at Google aims to replicate the innovation model of the DARPA (Defense Advanced Research Projects Agency) in the private sector.

=== Motorola ===
Before moving to Google, Eremenko was Vice President of Advanced Technology at Motorola where he started Project Ara prior to Google's sale of Motorola Mobility to Lenovo, while retaining the project.

=== DARPA ===
Eremenko served as the Deputy Director and Acting Director of the Tactical Technology Office at DARPA, the office responsible for the agency's drones, robotics, X-planes, and satellite programs. While at DARPA, Eremenko developed and managed several projects, including an effort to revolutionize design and manufacture of complex military systems (such as vehicles and aircraft) called Adaptive Vehicle Make, the System F6 fractionated spacecraft program, and the 100 Year Starship. Eremenko was also responsible for a crowd-sourced military vehicle effort called XC2V which was said to revolutionize auto manufacturing.

At DARPA, Eremenko developed two education-themed efforts: DARPA's MENTOR program focused on building a manufacturing workforce, and InSPIRE which made the SPHERES robotic platform on the International Space Station accessible to high school students.

=== Booz Allen Hamilton ===
Eremenko started his career as an associate in the defense business segment of Booz Allen Hamilton, consulting in particular for DARPA, which he later joined.

== Controversies ==
Since Eremenko was responsible for DARPA's drone and robotics programs, he was asked in the 2013 Nova documentary Rise of the Drones whether he was concerned about the dangers of artificial intelligence, he replied "if you were to ask ... whether the Rise of the Machines-type scenario is a real concern ... my response would be, 'We should be so lucky.' In fact, if we could get little slivers of that kind of adaptive and cognitive capability into systems, that would be a very significant breakthrough, from where we stand today."

The 100 Year Starship, which Eremenko headed at DARPA, was named by U.S. Senator Tom Coburn as one of the 100 most wasteful government spending projects. Coburn specifically cited a 100 Year Starship workshop that included one session, entitled "Did Jesus die for Klingons too?" that debated the implications for Christian philosophy should life be found on other planets.

== Other work ==
Eremenko was one of the creators and early proponents of a systems engineering strategy for creating more flexible and adaptable products known as value-driven design.

== Personal life ==
Eremenko is the son of the Ukrainian-American mathematician Alexandre Eremenko and the great grandson of a Marshal of the Soviet Union Andrei Eremenko’s brother Semion. Paul Eremenko was one of the most senior aerospace industry executives who is openly gay.
