= Business value =

Broad term for all forms of value in businesses

In management, business value is an informal term that includes all forms of value that determine the health and well-being of the firm in the long run. Business value expands concept of value of the firm beyond economic value (also known as economic profit, economic value added, and shareholder value) to include other forms of value such as employee value, customer value, supplier value, channel partner value, alliance partner value, managerial value, and societal value. Many of these forms of value are not directly measured in monetary terms. According to the Project Management Institute, business value is the "net quantifiable benefit derived from a business endeavor that may be tangible, intangible, or both."

Business value often embraces intangible assets not necessarily attributable to any stakeholder group. Examples include intellectual capital and a firm's business model. The balanced scorecard methodology is one of the most popular methods for measuring and managing business value. See Business valuation.

== Philosophy ==
The concept of business value aligned with the theory that a firm is best viewed as a network of relationships both internal and external. These networks are sometimes called a value network. Each node in the network could be a stakeholder group, a resource, an organization, end-consumers, interest groups, regulators, or the environment itself. In a value network, value creation is viewed as a collaborative, creative, synergistic process rather than purely mechanistic or a result of command-and-control.

If the firm is viewed as a network of value creating entities, then the question becomes how does each node in the network contribute to overall firm performance and how does it behave and respond to its own interests. When the nodes are independent organizations (e.g., suppliers) or agents (e.g., customers), it is assumed that the firm is seeking a cooperative, win-win relationship where all parties receive value. Even when nodes in the network are not fully independent (e.g., employees), it is assumed that incentives are important and that those incentives go beyond direct financial compensation.

While it would be very desirable to translate all forms of business value to a single economic measure (e.g., discounted cash flow), many practitioners and theorists believe this is either not feasible or theoretically impossible. Therefore, advocates of business value believe that the best approach is to measure and manage multiple forms of value as they apply to each stakeholder group.

As yet, there are no well-formed theories about how the various elements of business value are related to each other and how they might contribute to the firm's long-term success. One promising approach is the business model, but these are rarely formalized.

== History ==
Peter Drucker was an early proponent of business value as the proper goal of a firm, especially that a firm should create value for customers, employees (especially knowledge workers), and distribution partners. His management by objectives was a goal setting and decision-making tool to help managers at all levels create business value. However, he was skeptical that the dynamics of business value could ever be formalized, at least not with current methods.

Michael Porter popularized the concept of the value chain.

== Components ==
=== Shareholder value ===
For a publicly traded company, shareholder value is the part of its capitalization that is equity as opposed to long-term debt. In the case of only one type of capital stock, this would roughly be the number of outstanding shares times current share price. Things like dividends augment shareholder value while issuing of shares (stock options) lower it. This shareholder value added should be compared to average/required increase in value, also known as cost of capital.

For a privately held company, the value of the firm after debt must be estimated using one of several valuation methods, such as discounted cash flow or others.

=== Customer value ===
Customer value is the value received by the end-customer of a product or service. End-customer can include a single individual (consumer) or an organization with various individuals playing different roles in the buying-consumption processes. Customer value is conceived variously as utility, quality, benefits, and customer satisfaction.

=== Employee knowledge ===
This is often an undervalued asset in companies and also the area where there is the most discord in reporting. Employees are the most valuable asset companies possess and the one we expect the most from, but often the one that receives the short end of the stick when it comes to values applied to them.

=== Channel partner value ===
The value a business underpins on partner relationships in the business. Partner value here stresses that it can be critical to a firms functioning. It ceases to exist or carry out business activities if partner value is diminished or lost.

== Strategies for creating business value ==
An increase or decline in business value that an action produces is traditionally measured in terms of customer satisfaction, revenue growth, profitability, market share, wallet share, cross-sell ratio, marketing campaign response rates, or relationship duration.

Based on Maslow's hierarchy of needs, consultants Bain and Company described potential actions as building blocks of value for consumers and businesses. In their business to consumer (B2C) study they identified 30 elements of value in four categories. Their companion work in the B2B space characterised five categories and 40 elements of value.

The authors use a pyramid infographic to illustrate the range of value elements in both B2C and B2B contexts. In the business-to-consumer (B2C) model, the value elements are grouped into four categories: functional, emotional, life-changing, and social impact. Among the 14 functional elements are saving time, reducing effort, lowering costs, and improving quality. In the business-to-business (B2B) model, the value elements are categorized into five groups: table stakes, functional value, ease of doing business, individual value, and inspirational value. Of the 40 elements identified in the B2B context, three fall under the inspirational value category—vision, hope, and social responsibility.

What makes the pyramids most useful to businesses is that research shows that being good with multiple elements pays off and drives customer loyalty, the most important value elements vary by industry, auditing value elements in one business versus competitors can help generate a market map and creating additional customer value can be achieved without major product overhaul. An understanding of what creates opportunities to maximise customer value can also help define a development path that maximises the probability of achieving business growth.

=== Business value of information technology ===
Various factors affect the business value impact of information technology (IT). The most important factor is the alignment between IT and business processes, organization structure, and strategy. At the highest levels, this alignment is achieved through proper integration of enterprise architecture, business architecture, process design, organization design, and performance metrics.

At the level of computing and communications infrastructure, the following performance factors constrain and partially determine IT capabilities:

- Usability
- Functionality
- Availability
- Reliability, recoverability
- Performance (throughput, response time, predictability, capacity, etc.)
- Security
- Agility

The term value-driven design was devised to describe the approach to planning business change (especially systems) based on the incremental improvements to business value - this is seen clearly in agile software development, where the goals of each iteration of product delivery are prioritised on what delivers highest business value drives.

== Criticisms ==
Business value is an informal concept and there is no consensus, either in academic circles or among management professionals, on its meaning or on its role in effective decision-making. The term could even be described as a "buzz word" used by various consultants, analyst firms, executives, authors, and academics.

Some critics believe that measuring economic value, economic profit, or shareholder value is sufficiently complete to guide decision-making. They regard all other forms of value as essentially intermediate to the ultimate goal of economic profit. Furthermore, if they do not contribute to economic profit, they are actually a distraction for the firm.

Other critics believe that extensive efforts to measure business value will be more of a distraction than a boon. For example, there is a fear that decision-makers will become confused if they have too many goals and measures that need to be accommodated.

== See also ==
- Customer value
- Economic profit
- Shareholder value
- Utility
