= Spirale =

Spirale is a French government programme to develop an early warning system which will use infrared satellite imagery to detect the flights of ballistic missiles during their boost phase, just after launch. SPIRALE is an acronym which stands for "Système Préparatoire Infra-Rouge pour l’ALErte", literally "infrared preparatory system for alert".

The demonstrator system includes two 120 kilograms (260 lb) microsatellites and an alert and monitoring ground segment. The satellites have been launched by Ariane 5 on 12 February 2009.
