= Demeter (satellite) =

French micro-satellite

DEMETER (Detection of Electro-Magnetic Emissions Transmitted from Earthquake Regions) was a French micro-satellite operated by CNES devoted to the investigation of the ionospheric disturbances due to seismic and volcanic activity. It was launched on 29 June 2004, on a quasi Sun-synchronous circular orbit with an inclination of about 98.23° and an altitude of about 710 km. The altitude was changed to about 660 km in December 2005.

Due to the specific orbit, DEMETER was always located either shortly before the local noon (10:30 local time) or local midnight (22:30 local time). The satellite performs 14 orbits per day and measures continuously between -65° and +65° of invariant latitude.

DEMETER observed an increase in ultra low frequency radio waves in the month before the 2010 Haiti earthquake. During the 2010 eruption of Mount Merapi, DEMETER noted anomalies in the ionosphere. Scientific operations ended December 9, 2010.

== Scientific Objectives ==
- To study the ionospheric disturbances in relation to the seismic activity and to examine the pre- and post-seismic effects
- To study the ionospheric disturbances in relation to the volcano activity
- To survey the ionospheric disturbances in relation to the anthropogenic activity
- To contribute to the understanding of the generation mechanism of these disturbances
- To give a global information on the Earth's electromagnetic environment

== Scientific Payload ==
- IMSC: three magnetic sensors from a few Hz up to 18 kHz
- ICE: three electric sensors from DC up to 3.5 MHz
- IAP: an ion analyzer
- ISL: a Langmuir probe by ESA, LPCE, and the Czech Institute of Atmospheric Physics of CAS
- IDP: an energetic particle detector

== Modes of Operation ==
Due to the limited capacity of the telemetry, there were two different modes of operation:

- During the "Survey mode", averaged data were collected all around the Earth. The telemetry flow in this mode was reduced by the on-board data processing to 25 kbit/s.
- During the "Burst mode", high-precision data were collected above the specific areas of interest, corresponding mostly to the seismic regions. The data bit rate in this mode was 1.7 Mbit/s.
