= Scott Jessop =

American Internet celebrity

- Born: Scott Jessop; 29 October 1977 (age 49)
- Occupations: Internet celebrity; blogger
- Years active: 2012-2024

YouTube information
- Channel: IamSkippy Scott Skippy Jessop
- Genre: Vlogs
- Subscribers: 35.5 thousand
- Views: 5.1 million
- Last updated: May 2, 2023
- Website: iamskippy.com

Scott Jessop, known by his online alias IamSkippy, (born 29 October 1977) is an American Internet celebrity. Jessop is known for his original appearance in the TLC TV Series, Virgin Diaries which he appeared on in 2012.

He uploads regular videos on his own YouTube channel about his life and showcasing dates that he regularly goes on. Jessop is also known for his work and appearance with the documentary film, Sundance Skippy.

As of November 2026, Jessop has not uploaded any new content since August 2024.

== Early life ==
Jessop was born in Orem, Utah. He was raised in a Mormon community. He is a graduate from Utah Valley University where he studied broadcast journalism.

== Career ==
In 2010, Jessop appeared as part of the documentary film, Sundance Skippy. In the film, Jessop would approach celebrities for photos. In 2023, Jessop released an update video to commemorate 20 years of him visiting the Sundance Film Festival, which is held in Utah, USA.

Scott first appeared on the TLC Original Series, Virgin Diaries. He appeared on the show about his own virginity and celibacy. He has mentioned through his YouTube channel that he is not an incel.

He has since grown his own online presence through videos on his YouTube channel.

Jessop has appeared on several podcasts including the H3 Podcast in 2020 and the Fresh&Fit Podcast in 2021.
