= Satellite formation flying =

Satellite formation flying is the coordination of multiple satellites to accomplish the objective of one larger, usually more expensive, satellite. Coordinating smaller satellites has many benefits over single satellites including simpler designs, faster build times, cheaper replacement creating higher redundancy, unprecedented high resolution, and the ability to view research targets from multiple angles or at multiple times. These qualities make them ideal for astronomy, communications, meteorology, and environmental uses.

== Types of formations ==
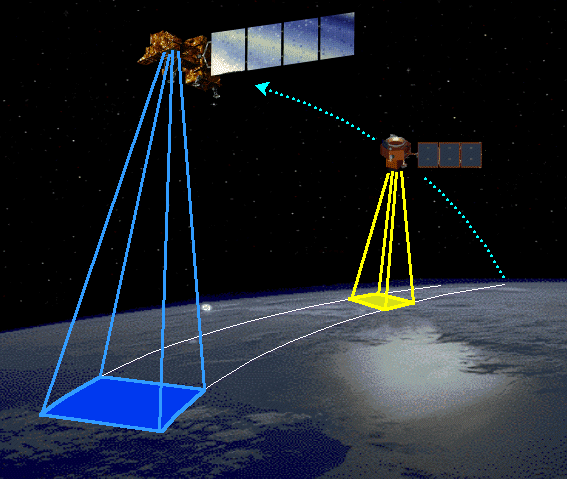
Landsat-7 being trailed by EO-1 covering the same area at different times

Depending on the application, there are three formations possible: trailing, cluster, and constellation.

- Trailing formations are formed by multiple satellites orbiting on the same path. Each one follows the previous one separated by a specific time interval to either view a target at different times, or obtain varied viewing angles of the target. Trailing satellites are especially suited for meteorological and environmental applications such as viewing the progress of a fire, cloud formations, and making 3D views of hurricanes. Notable pairs are GRACE and GRACE-Follow On satellites, Landsat 7 with EO-1, the "A-train" consisting of CALIPSO and CloudSat (among others), and Terra with Aqua.
- Cluster formations are formed by satellites in a dense (relatively tightly spaced) arrangement, such as twin satellites. These arrangements are best for high resolution interferometry and making maps of Earth. TechSat-21 was a suggested satellite model capable of operating in clusters. The proposed Laser Interferometer Space Antenna would require high-precision cluster flying.
- Constellation formations (satellite constellations) can be considered to be a number of satellites with coordinated ground coverage, operating together under shared control, synchronised so that they overlap well in coverage and complement rather than interfere with other satellites' important coverage

Usually, these formations are made up of numerous small satellites. A micro satellite weighs under 100 kg and a nano satellite weighs under 10kg. Magnetosheric Constellation, for instance, would be composed of 100 micro satellites.

This technology has become more viable thanks to the development of autonomous flying. With an onboard computer and this algorithm, satellites may autonomously position themselves into a formation. Previously, ground control would have to adjust each satellite to maintain formations. Now, satellites may arrive at and maintain formations with faster response time and have the ability to change the formation for varied resolution of observations. Also, satellites may be launched from different spacecraft and rendezvous on a particular path. This advance was made possible by Dave Folta, John Bristow, and Dave Quinn at NASA’s Goddard Space Flight Center (GSFC).

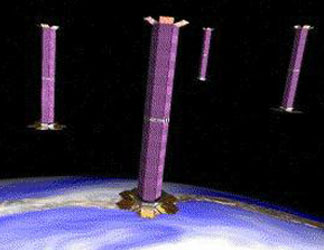
Cluster formation for the proposed TechSat-21 mission.

== See also ==
- Satellite constellation
- Fractionated spacecraft
- Magnetospheric Multiscale Mission
