= Virtual device driver =

- A device driver handling a virtual device.
- VxD, a type of Windows device driver running in 32-bit protected mode.
