= Picard (satellite) =

Solar science research satellite

- Mission type: Solar research
- Operator: CNES
- COSPAR ID: 2010-028A
- SATCAT no.: 36598

Spacecraft properties
- Bus: Myriade

Start of mission
- Launch date: 15 June 2010, 14:42:21 UTC
- Rocket: Dnepr
- Launch site: Dombarovsky, Site 370/13
- Contractor: ISC Kosmotras

End of mission
- Last contact: 4 April 2014 UTC

Orbital parameters
- Reference system: Geocentric
- Regime: Low Earth

PICARD is a satellite dedicated to the simultaneous measurement of the absolute total and spectral solar irradiance, the diameter and solar shape, and to the Sun's interior probing by the helioseismology method. These measurements obtained throughout the mission allow study of their variations as a function of solar activity. It launched, along with the Prisma spacecraft, on 15 June 2010 on a Dnepr launcher from Dombarovskiy Cosmodrome, near Yasny, Russia. The mission, originally planned for two years, ended on 4 April 2014.

== Objectives ==
The objectives of the PICARD mission are to improve humanity's knowledge of:

- the functioning of our star through new observations,
- the influence of the solar activity on the climate of the Earth.

== History ==
The PICARD mission was named after the French astronomer of the 17th century Jean Picard (1620–1682) who achieved the first accurate measurements of the solar diameter. These measurements are especially important as they were made during a period when the solar activity was minimum characterized by a sun nearly without sunspots between 1645 and 1710. This period was found by Gustav Spörer using sunspots observations gathered in Europe and this period is now named Maunder minimum. By comparing the diameter during the Maunder minimum and the diameter when the sun was active a variation has been found, leading to the still-unanswered question, "Are diameter and activity linked?" During this period in Europe, there was an unusually cold climate.

== Platform ==
PICARD used the Myriade microsatellite platform, developed by CNES to use as much as possible common equipment. This platform was designed for a total mass of about 120 kg mass at launch. Its attitude in space is maintained by using a star sensor, solar sensors, a magnetometer, gyrometers, several magnetic rods and reaction wheels. If an orbit control and orbit manoeuvres are needed, a hydrazine system may be used. The on-board management is centralised, and uses a 10 MIPS microprocessor T805. A mass memory is available for the data storage. The telemetry and telecommand used the CCSDS standard.

== Payload ==
The PICARD payload is composed of the following instruments:

- SOVAP (SOlar VAriability PICARD): composed of a differential radiometer and a bolometric sensor to measure the total solar irradiance (previously called solar constant),
- PREMOS (PREcision MOnitor Sensor): a set of 3 photometers to study the ozone formation and destruction, and to perform helioseismologic observations, and a differential radiometer to measure the total solar irradiance,
- SODISM (SOlar Diameter Imager and Surface Mapper): an imaging telescope accurately pointed and a CCD which allows measuring the solar diameter and shape with an accuracy of a few milliarc second, and to perform helioseismologic observations to probe the solar interior.
