= ELISA (satellite) =

Satellite

ELISA (ELectronic Intelligence by SAtellite) is a suite of four French military satellites launched on 17 December 2011 from Arianespace's Kourou spaceport in French Guiana. It consists of microsatellites ELISA 1 (or ELISA W11, COSPAR ID: 2011-076A), ELISA 2 (or ELISA E12, COSPAR ID: 2011-076D), ELISA 3 (or ELISA W23, COSPAR ID: 2011-076C), and ELISA 4 (or ELISA E24, COSPAR ID: 2011-076B)

The entire ELISA suite was launched on a single Soyuz ST-A launch vehicle, along with Pléiades-1 and SSOT. The ELISA program is a demonstrator meant to pave the way for a planned Signals intelligence constellation called CERES. The ELISA satellites are in a Low Earth orbit a few kilometers from each other to record radar and radio transmissions. Since 2014, they have been used as a pre-operational system.

The satellites are built around the Myriade microsatellite bus.

== See also ==
- ESSAIM - another French military SIGINT microsatellite project
- CERES - the follow-on French space-based SIGINT program
