= Essaim (satellite) =

Decommissioned French military satellite constellation

Essaim (swarm, in French) was a French military reconnaissance microsatellite constellation. Its main purpose was to collect and map signals intelligence around the world. The Direction générale de l'armement (DGA) described it as a "vacuum cleaner for [radio] waves".

== Description ==
Essaim was a constellation of four 120 kg microsatellites (one of which was a spare) in low Earth orbit (LEO). They were demonstration models which were supposed to last three years. They flew separated by a few hundreds of kilometers. Missions were designed by the Celar (Centre d'électronique de l'armement) in Bruz, near Rennes and were uploaded from CNES in Toulouse to the constellation. Collected data followed the same path in reverse order.

== Launch ==
The constellation was launched from Kourou, in French Guiana, by an Ariane 5 G+ launch vehicle on 18 December 2004. The flight was shared with Helios 2A and two other auxiliary payloads: Parasol and Nanosat 01.

Individual members of the constellation were Essaim 1 (COSPAR ID: 2004-049C), Essaim 2 (COSPAR ID: 2004-049D), Essaim 3 (COSPAR ID: 2004-049E) and Essaim 4 (COSPAR ID: 2004-049F).

== Decommissioning ==
ESSAIM disposal and passivation operations took place in October 2010. The satellites are expected to reenter within 15 to 19 years (2025-2029).

== See also ==
- ELISA (satellite)
