= Athena-Fidus =

French-Italian telecommunication satellite

- Mission type: Telecommunications
- Operator: DIRISI
- COSPAR ID: 2014-006B
- SATCAT no.: 39509
- Mission duration: 15 years (planned)

Spacecraft properties
- Bus: Spacebus-3000B2
- Manufacturer: Thales Alenia Space
- Launch mass: 3080 kg
- Power: 5000 watts

Start of mission
- Launch date: 6 February 2014, 21:30:00 UTC
- Rocket: Ariane 5 ECA
- Launch site: Centre Spatial Guyanais, ELA-3
- Contractor: Arianespace
- Entered service: 14 March 2014

Orbital parameters
- Reference system: Geocentric orbit
- Regime: Geostationary orbit
- Epoch: 14 March 2014

Transponders
- Band: Ka-band

Athena-Fidus (Access on theatres for European allied forces nations-French Italian dual use satellite) is a French-Italian telecommunication satellite providing high-throughput secure communications to both nation's armed forces and their emergency services. It was manufactured by Thales Alenia Space under the supervision of CNES, the Direction générale de l'armement (DGA) and the Italian Space Agency (ASI). It complements the lower-throughput but more secure Syracuse 3 satellites. The satellite has a wet mass of 3080 kg and was placed on geostationary orbit in 2014. Its expected lifetime is 15 years.

== Manufacturing ==
The manufacturing contract was awarded in February 2010 to Thales Alenia Space. The satellite bus is a Spacebus 4000B2, manufactured in Cannes Mandelieu Space Center.

== Launch ==
The satellite was launched by an Ariane 5 ECA rocket on 6 February 2014 during the VA217 mission. After some on-orbit tests, official satellite commissioning took place on 14 March 2014.

== Payload ==
Although this is a common program, each country operates its own share of the payload. The satellite provides an encrypted, 3 Gbit/s throughput, using mostly Ka-band links. It carries 14 antennas including 7 mobile spot antennas, enabling positioning of steerable 1750-km diameter spot beams over operational theaters requiring a high bandwidth. France owns five beams and Italy, two. The system will enable communication with deployable ground stations (420 for France), and with drones.

== Ground Segment ==
The ground segment for the French part of the capacity is called Comcept. Comcept will provide a network of fixed and deployable ground stations using full-IP (Internet Protocol) technology. The system includes high-data-rate (HDR) ground stations which are installed in a transportable shelter and provide a speed of approximately 10 Mbit/s. The Comcept system is provided by Airbus Defence and Space and Actia Sodielec.

== Russian espionage ==
On 7 September 2018, during a visit to the Toulouse Space Centre, the Ministry of the Armed Forces, Florence Parly, accused Russia of having committed "an act of espionage" in 2017 against the satellite to try to intercept secure communications.
