= Fractionated spacecraft =

Distributed modular satellite system

Artist's impression of a fractionated spacecraft

A fractionated spacecraft is a satellite architecture where the functional capabilities of a conventional monolithic spacecraft are distributed across multiple modules which interact through Wireless links. Unlike other aggregations of spacecraft, such as constellations and clusters, the modules of a fractionated spacecraft are largely heterogeneous and perform distinct functions corresponding, for instance, to the various subsystem elements of a traditional satellite.

== History ==
The term "fractionated spacecraft" appears to have been coined by Owen Brown and Paul Eremenko in a series of 2006 papers, which argue that a fractionated architecture offers more flexibility and robustness than traditional satellite design during mission operations, and during the design and procurement.

The idea dates back to at least a 1984 article by P. Molette. Molette's, and later analyses by Rooney, concluded that the benefits of fractionated spacecraft were outweighed by their higher mass and cost. By 2006, Brown and his collaborators claim that the option value of flexibility, the insurance value of improved robustness, and mass production effects will exceed any penalties, and make an analogy with distributed clusters of personal computers (PCs) which are overtaking supercomputers. A 2006 study by the Massachusetts Institute of Technology appears to have corroborated this latter view.

== Development ==

In 2007, DARPA, the Pentagon's advanced technology organization, issued an announcement soliciting proposals for a program entitled System F6, which aims to prove "the feasibility and benefits" of a fractionated satellite architecture through a space demonstration. The program appears to emphasize wireless networking as a critical technical enabler, along with econometric modeling to assess if and when the architecture is advantageous over conventional approaches

DARPA called for open-source development of the networking and communications protocols and interfaces for the fractionated spacecraft modules. This unusual step was presumably in an effort to proliferate the concept and mirror in space the development of the terrestrial Internet.

In 2008, DARPA announced that contracts for the preliminary development phase of the System F6 program were issued to teams headed by Boeing, Lockheed Martin, Northrop Grumman, and Orbital Sciences.

In December 2009 the second phase of the program was awarded to Orbital Sciences, along with IBM and JPL.

In February 2010, the European Space Agency (ESA) completed a study on fractionated satellites under the GSTP program.

On May 16, 2013, DARPA confirmed that they cancelled the Formation-flying Satellite Demo, which means that they closed the project.

ANDESITE is a fractionated spacecraft with 8 components, and was launched on June 13, 2020.

== Miscellaneous ==
Fractionating a communications satellite mission appears to be subject to U.S. patent 6,633,745, "Satellite cluster comprising a plurality of modular satellites".
