= Space Operations Group =

- 宇宙作戦群
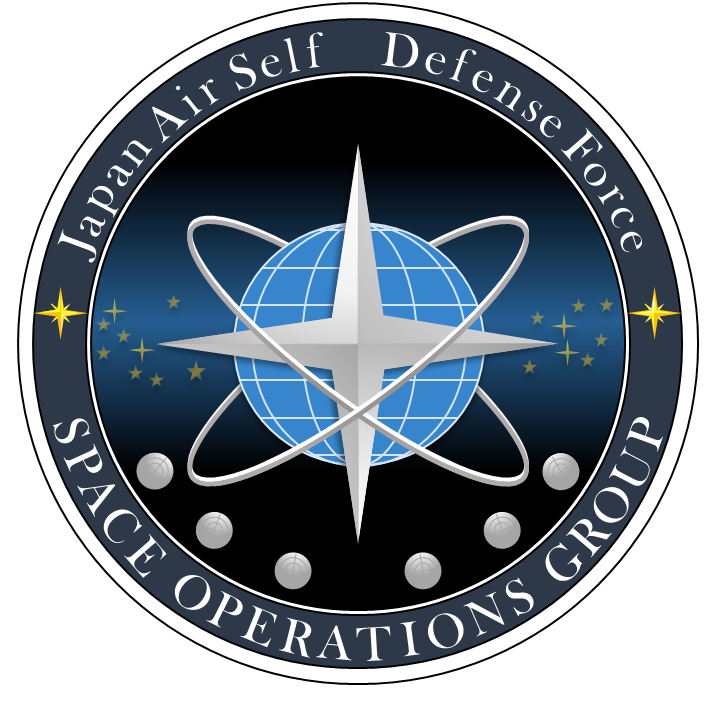
- SOG logo.
- Founded: 18 May 2020 (6 years)
- Country: Japan
- Branch: Japan Air Self-Defense Force
- Role: Space operations
- Headquarters: Fuchū Air Base

Insignia
- Flag

The Space Operations Group (宇宙作戦群, Uchū Sakusengun) is a unit of the Japan Air and Space Self-Defense Force (JASDF) based at Fuchu Air Base in Fuchu, Tokyo. It is responsible for Japan's space domain awareness, combining data from a sensor near Sanyo-Onoda in Yamaguchi Prefecture with information provided by the Japan Aerospace Exploration Agency (JAXA) and the United States Space Force. The group also supports other military units through satellite navigation and communications.

== History ==
The former Space Operations Squadron was established on 18 May 2020 in a ceremony held by the Japanese Ministry of Defense with 20 JASDF personnel. As of December 2022, the SOS have around 150 personnel. In FY 2020, the 2nd Space Operations Squadron was set up at Hōfu Air Field.

On March 17, 2022, the Space Operations Group was established with 150 airmen. The "Space Operations Command Center Operation Squadron" was established on March 18, 2022, with 30 airmen.

On March 16, 2023, the Space Operations Squadron was reorganized into the 1st Space Operations Squadron. The Space Systems Management Squadron was established with the 2nd Space Operations Squadron in the same month.

== Organization ==
The SOG is established with the following structure as of 2023:

- Space Operations Group Headquarters
- Space Operations Command Center Operation Squadron
- 1st Space Operations Squadron
- 2nd Space Operations Squadron
- Space System Management Squadron

== See also ==
- Space Delta 2
- Space Delta 8
