= 2016 in spaceflight =

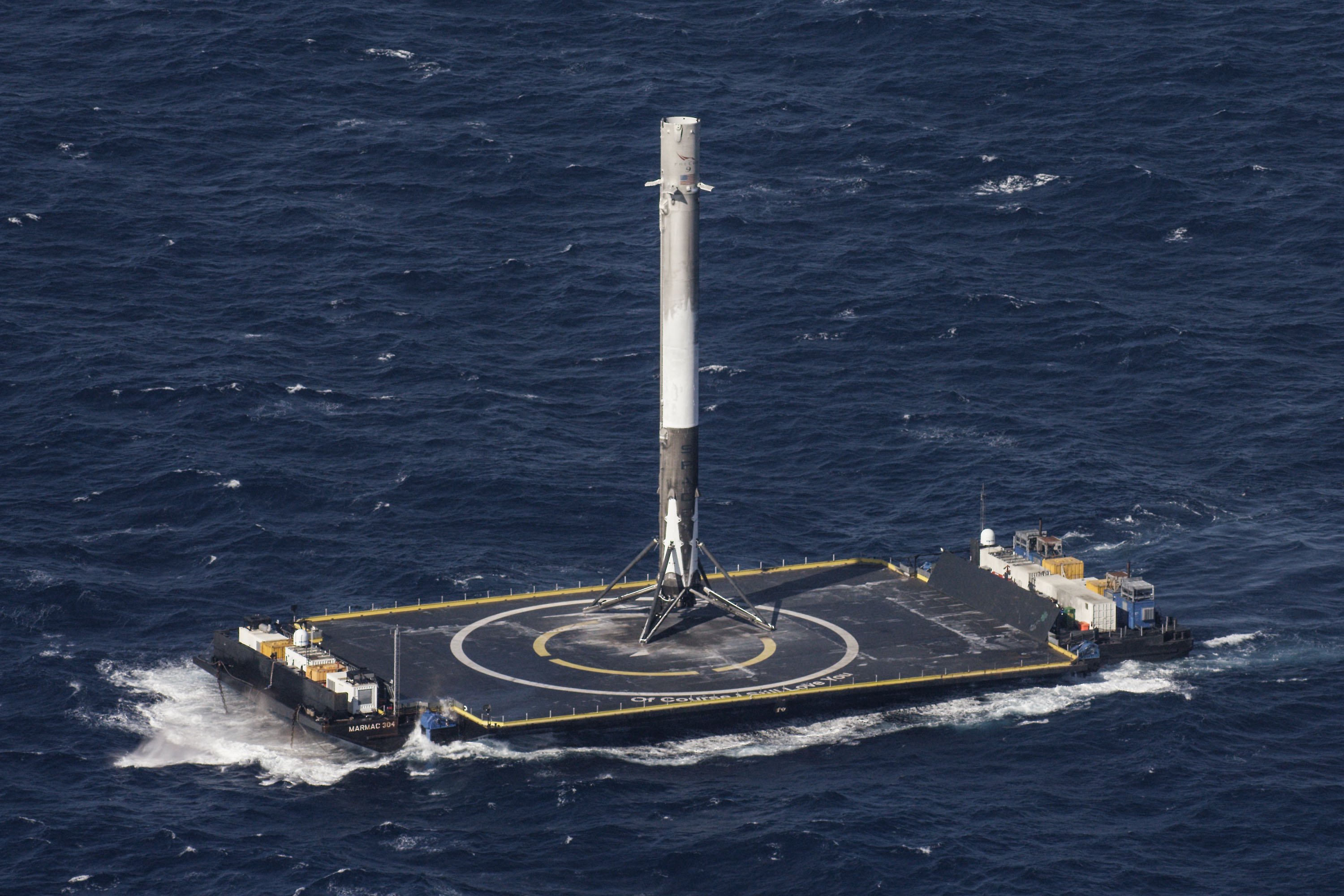
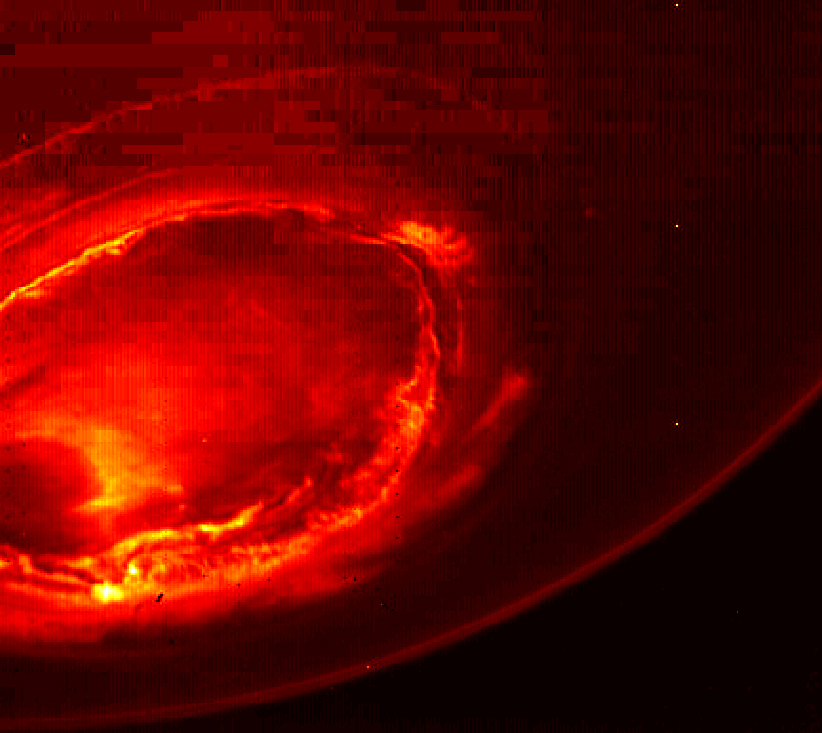
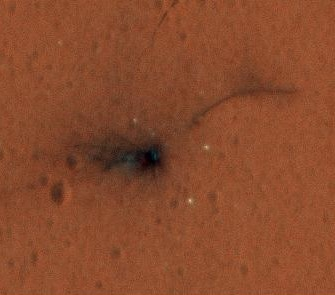
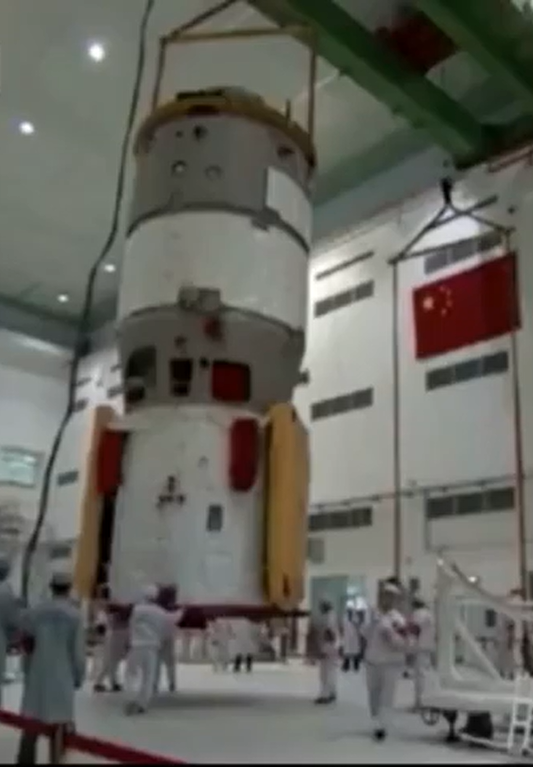
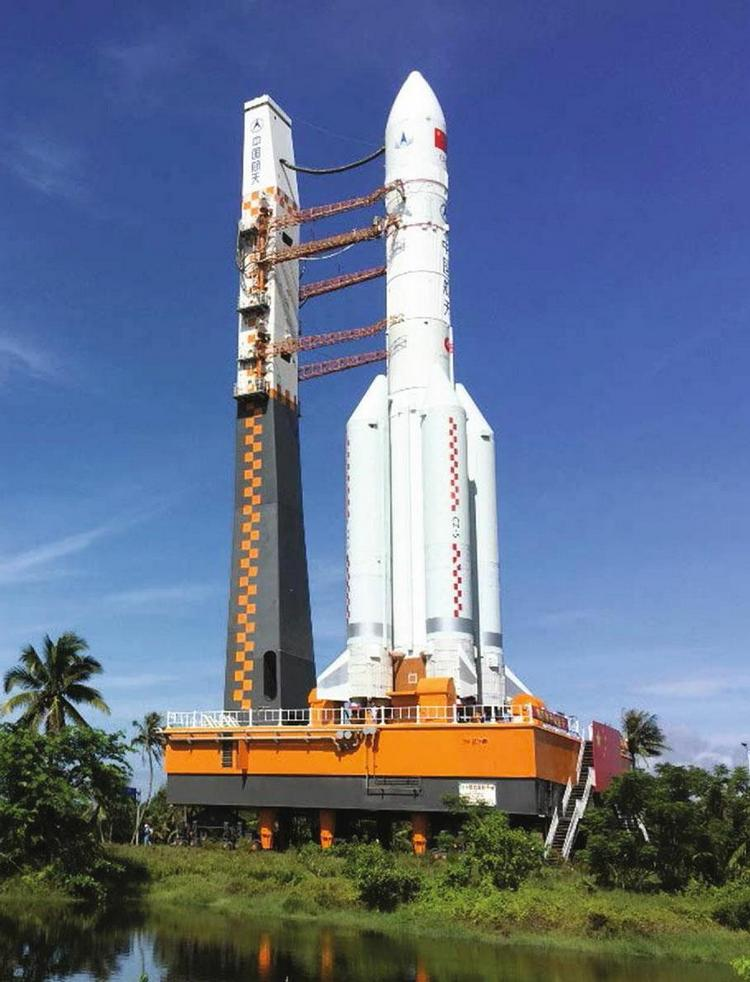
- Highlights from spaceflight in 2016 (Note: Clockwise from top: The first ever landing of a Falcon 9 Full Thrust first stage on an autonomous spaceport drone ship, during Falcon 9 Flight 23 in April.; The impact site of Schiaparelli on Meridiani Planum, viewed by the Mars Reconnaissance Orbiter in October. The lander's retro-rockets failed during descent, and accidentally impacted Mars at an estimated speed of 540 kilometres per hour (340 mph).; Juno observes Jupiter's southern aurora during its first science orbit in August, seven weeks after its partially successful orbital insertion around the planet. Following an engine failure in its second orbit, the spacecraft remained in a larger orbit than intended for its prime mission.; Image of Tiangong-2, China's 2nd space laboratory, undergoing ground testing.; Maiden flight of Long March 5, the first Heavy-lift launch vehicle rocket launched in Asia)

Orbital launches
- First: 15 January
- Last: 28 December
- Total: 85
- Successes: 82
- Failures: 2
- Partial failures: 1
- Catalogued: 83

Rockets
- Maiden flights: Soyuz-2.1a / Volga; Long March 7; Antares 230; Long March 5
- Retirements: Atlas V 431; Falcon 9 v1.1; PSLV-G; VLS-1

Crewed flights
- Orbital: 5
- Total travellers: 14
- EVAs: 4

2016 in spaceflight

Several new rockets and spaceports began operations in 2016.

== Overview ==
Russia inaugurated the far-Eastern Vostochny Cosmodrome on 28 April 2016 with a traditional Soyuz-2.1a flight, before expanding it for the Angara rocket family in the following years. The Chinese Long March 7 flew its maiden flight from the new Wenchang Satellite Launch Center on Hainan Island on 25 June, and the maiden flight of the Long March 5 took place on 3 November. Two years after its 2014 accident, the Antares rocket returned to flight on 17 October with its upgraded 230 version featuring the Russian RD-181 engine.

After many failed attempts, SpaceX began landing its Falcon 9 first stages on autonomous spaceport drone ships, edging closer to their long-stated goal of developing reusable launch vehicles. The company indicated that the recovered engines and structures did not suffer significant damage. One of the landed boosters, B1021, launched in April 2016, was flown again in March 2017; two others were converted to side boosters for the maiden flight of Falcon Heavy.

The ExoMars mission, a collaboration between the European and Russian space agencies, was launched on 14 March and reached Mars on 19 October. Dedicated to astrobiology investigations, this flight carried the ExoMars Trace Gas Orbiter, which reached Mars orbit, and the Schiaparelli EDM lander, which crashed upon landing. A subsequent flight scheduled for 2020 will carry the ExoMars Rosalind Franklin rover along with four static surface instruments. Meanwhile, the Japanese space probe Akatsuki started its observations of Venus in May after spending five months gradually adjusting its orbit. Planetary exploration activities took center stage with the orbit insertion of NASA's Juno probe at Jupiter on 4 July, followed by the launch of NASA's OSIRIS-REx mission to asteroid 101955 Bennu on 8 September. Finally, on 30 September, the Rosetta probe executed a slow crash-landing on comet 67P/Churyumov–Gerasimenko.

Human spaceflights included the return of Scott Kelly and Mikhail Kornienko in March after a yearlong mission on the ISS, the longest-ever continuous stay by astronauts at the station. Kelly also set the record for the longest-duration stay of an American in orbit. Four ISS Expeditions numbered 47 to 50 were launched in 2016, the first one using the last Soyuz TMA-M spacecraft and the next three inaugurating the modernized Soyuz MS. Expedition 50 will continue into 2017. Several EVAs were performed to maintain the exterior of the ISS. The experimental BEAM inflatable habitat was attached to the ISS on 16 April and expanded on 28 May to begin two years of on-orbit tests. Meanwhile, China launched its new Tiangong-2 space laboratory in September, which was first visited by two astronauts for a month between 19 October and 17 November.

== Orbital launches ==
- ← Jan
- Feb
- Mar
- Apr
- May
- Jun
- Jul
- Aug
- Sep
- Oct
- Nov
- Dec →

Date and time (UTC)	Rocket	Flight number	Launch site		LSP	
Date and time (UTC)	Payload (⚀ = CubeSat)	Operator	Orbit	Function	Decay (UTC)	Outcome
Date and time (UTC)	Remarks					
=== January ===
15 January; 16:57:04	(China) Long March 3B/E		(China) Xichang LC-3		(China) CASC	
15 January; 16:57:04	(Belarus) Belintersat 1 (ChinaSat 15)	Belarus/China Satcom	Geosynchronous	Communications	In orbit	Operational
17 January; 18:42:18	(United States) Falcon 9 v1.1	F9-021	(United States) Vandenberg SLC-4E		(United States) SpaceX	
17 January; 18:42:18	(United States) (France) Jason-3	NOAA / EUMETSAT/NASA/CNES	Low Earth	Earth observation	In orbit	Operational
17 January; 18:42:18	Final flight of the standard Falcon 9 v1.1, future flights will use the upgraded Falcon 9 Full Thrust. Falcon 9's first stage performed a soft landing on an autonomous spaceport drone ship in the Pacific Ocean, but the failure of one landing leg to lock into position caused it to fall over and break apart.					
20 January; 04:01:00	(India) PSLV-XL	C31	(India) Satish Dhawan SLP		(India) ISRO	
20 January; 04:01:00	(India) IRNSS-1E	ISRO	Geosynchronous	Navigation	In orbit	Operational
27 January; 23:20:48	(France) Ariane 5 ECA	VA228	(France) Kourou ELA-3		(France) Arianespace	
27 January; 23:20:48	(United States) Intelsat 29e	Intelsat	Geosynchronous	Communications	In orbit	Spacecraft failure (8 April 2019)
29 January; 22:20:09	(Russia) Proton-M / Briz-M		(Kazakhstan) Baikonur Site 200/39		(Russia) (United States) International Launch Services	
29 January; 22:20:09	(France) Eutelsat 9B/EDRS-A	Eutelsat/ESA	Geosynchronous	Communications	In orbit	Operational
29 January; 22:20:09	Carries the first laser communication node for the European Data Relay System					
← Jan; Feb; Mar; Apr; May; Jun; Jul; Aug; Sep; Oct; Nov; Dec →; === February ===
1 February; 07:29:04	(China) Long March 3C/E / YZ-1		(China) Xichang LC-3		(China) CASC	
1 February; 07:29:04	(China) BeiDou-3M 3-S (BeiDou-21)	CNSA	Medium Earth	Navigation	In orbit	Operational
5 February; 13:38:00	(United States) Atlas V 401	AV-057	(United States) Cape Canaveral SLC-41		(United States) United Launch Alliance	
5 February; 13:38:00	(United States) USA-266 (GPS-IIF 12/Betelgeuse)	USAF	Medium Earth	Navigation	In orbit	Operational
5 February; 13:38:00	Named after Star Betelgeuse.					
7 February; 00:21:07	(Russia) Soyuz-2.1b / Fregat		(Russia) Plesetsk Site 43/4		(Russia) RVSN RF	
7 February; 00:21:07	(Russia) Kosmos 2514 (GLONASS-M 751)	VKS	Medium Earth	Navigation	In orbit	Operational
7 February; 00:30	(North Korea) Unha-3		(North Korea) Sohae		(North Korea) NADA	
7 February; 00:30	(North Korea) Kwangmyŏngsŏng-4	NADA	Low Earth	Earth observation	30 June 2023	Successful
10 February; 11:40:32	(United States) Delta IV M+ (5,2)		(United States) Vandenberg SLC-6		(United States) United Launch Alliance	
10 February; 11:40:32	(United States) USA-267 / Topaz-4	NRO	Retrograde LEO	Reconnaissance	In orbit	Operational
10 February; 11:40:32	NROL-45 mission. Spacecraft launched in a retrograde orbit.					
16 February; 17:57:40	(Russia) Rokot / Briz-KM		(Russia) Plesetsk Site 133/3		(France) / (Russia) Eurockot	
16 February; 17:57:40	Sentinel-3A	ESA	Low Earth (SSO)	Earth observation	In orbit	Operational
17 February; 08:45:00	(Japan) H-IIA 202	F30	(Japan) Tanegashima LA-Y1		(Japan) MHI	
17 February; 08:45:00	(Japan) (United States) Hitomi (ASTRO-H)	JAXA / NASA	Low Earth	X-ray astronomy	In orbit	Spacecraft failure
17 February; 08:45:00	(Japan) ChubuSat-2	Nagoya University	Low Earth	Radiation / Amateur radio	In orbit	Operational
17 February; 08:45:00	(Japan) ChubuSat-3	MHI	Low Earth	Remote sensing / Space debris monitor	In orbit	Operational
17 February; 08:45:00	(Japan) Horyu-4	Kyushu Institute of Technology	Low Earth	Technology demonstration	In orbit	Operational
17 February; 08:45:00	Hitomi malfunctioned after initial checkouts, and is believed to have lost attitude control and snapped off its solar array. 28 April, JAXA has abandoned efforts to recover the spacecraft.					
← Jan; Feb; Mar; Apr; May; Jun; Jul; Aug; Sep; Oct; Nov; Dec →; === March ===
4 March; 23:35:00	(United States) Falcon 9 Full Thrust	F9-022	(United States) Cape Canaveral SLC-40		(United States) SpaceX	
4 March; 23:35:00	(Luxembourg) SES-9	SES S.A.	Geosynchronous	Communications	In orbit	Operational
4 March; 23:35:00	High-velocity landing test ended with a hard landing on the drone ship Of Course I Still Love You and destruction of the first stage.					
9 March; 05:20:07	(France) Ariane 5 ECA	VA229	(France) Kourou ELA-3		(France) Arianespace	
9 March; 05:20:07	(France) Eutelsat 65 West A	Eutelsat	Geosynchronous	Communications	In orbit	Operational
10 March; 10:31:00	(India) PSLV-XL	C32	(India) Satish Dhawan SLP		(India) ISRO	
10 March; 10:31:00	(India) IRNSS-1F	ISRO	Geosynchronous	Navigation	In orbit	Operational
13 March; 18:56:00	(Russia) Soyuz-2.1b		(Kazakhstan) Baikonur Site 31/6		(Russia) Roscosmos	
13 March; 18:56:00	(Russia) Resurs-P No.3	Roscosmos	Low Earth (SSO)	Earth observation	17 October 2023	Partial spacecraft failure
13 March; 18:56:00	The launch succeeded on its second attempt after a rare pad abort the day before.					
14 March; 09:31:42	(Russia) Proton-M / Briz-M		(Kazakhstan) Baikonur Site 200/39		(Russia) Khrunichev	
14 March; 09:31:42	/ (Russia) ExoMars Trace Gas Orbiter	ESA	Areocentric orbit	Mars orbiter	In orbit	Operational
14 March; 09:31:42	Schiaparelli EDM lander	ESA	TMI to Martian Surface	Mars lander	19 October 2016	Landing failure
18 March; 21:26:38	(Russia) Soyuz-FG		(Kazakhstan) Baikonur Site 1/5		(Russia) Roscosmos	
18 March; 21:26:38	(Russia) Soyuz TMA-20M	Roscosmos	Low Earth (ISS)	Expedition 47/48	7 September 2016; 01:13	Successful
18 March; 21:26:38	Crewed flight with three cosmonauts. Final flight of the Soyuz TMA-M variant					
23 March; 03:05:52	(United States) Atlas V 401	AV-064	(United States) Cape Canaveral SLC-41		(United States) United Launch Alliance	
23 March; 03:05:52	(United States) Cygnus CRS OA-6; S.S. Rick Husband	Orbital ATK / NASA	Low Earth (ISS)	ISS logistics	22 June 2016; 13:29	Successful
23 March; 03:05:52	(Philippines) (Japan) Diwata-1	DOST / TU	Low Earth	Earth observation	6 April 2020	Successful
23 March; 03:05:52	⚀ (United States) Flock-2e' × 20	Planet Labs	Low Earth	Earth observation	First: 3 October 2017; Last: 10 November 2018	Successful
23 March; 03:05:52	⚀ (United States) Lemur-2 × 9	Spire Global	Low Earth	Earth observation	First: 27 February 2017; Last: 7 April 2017	8 successful, 1 failed to deploy
23 March; 03:05:52	Anomaly in the mixture ratio control valve assembly, causing the Atlas V booster engine to cut off five seconds early, resulting in a longer-than-usual Centaur orbital insertion burn. Cubesats deployed from the ISS and the Cygnus spacecraft at a later date.					
24 March; 09:42:00	(Russia) Soyuz-2.1a		(Russia) Plesetsk Site 43/4		(Russia) RVSN RF	
24 March; 09:42:00	(Russia) Kosmos 2515 (Bars-M 2L)	VKS	Low Earth (SSO)	Reconnaissance	In orbit	Operational
29 March; 20:11:04	(China) Long March 3A		(China) Xichang LC-2		(China) CASC	
29 March; 20:11:04	(China) BeiDou IGSO-6	CNSA	IGSO	Navigation	In orbit	Operational
31 March; 16:23:57	(Russia) Soyuz-2.1a		(Kazakhstan) Baikonur Site 31/6		(Russia) Roscosmos	
31 March; 16:23:57	(Russia) Progress MS-02 / 63P	Roscosmos	Low Earth (ISS)	ISS logistics	14 October 2016; 13:39	Successful
31 March; 16:23:57	⚀ (Russia) Tomsk-TPU-120	Tomsk Polytechnic University	Low Earth	Technology demonstration	20 October 2019	Successful
31 March; 16:23:57	Tomsk-TPU-120 is a CubeSat deployed into orbit from ISS by Russian astronauts spacewalk on 17 August 2017.					
← Jan; Feb; Mar; Apr; May; Jun; Jul; Aug; Sep; Oct; Nov; Dec →; === April ===
5 April; 17:38:04	(China) Long March 2D		(China) Jiuquan LA-4/SLS-2		(China) CASC	
5 April; 17:38:04	(China) Shijian 10	CAS	Low Earth	Microgravity Science	18 April 2016; 08:30	Successful
8 April; 20:43:31	(United States) Falcon 9 Full Thrust	F9-023	(United States) Cape Canaveral SLC-40		(United States) SpaceX	
8 April; 20:43:31	(United States) SpaceX CRS-8	NASA	Low Earth (ISS)	ISS logistics	11 May 2016; 18:31	Successful
8 April; 20:43:31	(United States) BEAM	Bigelow Aerospace / NASA	Low Earth (ISS)	Technology demonstration / ISS Assembly	In orbit	Operational
8 April; 20:43:31	First stage landed successfully on drone ship Of Course I Still Love You for the first time, the second successful landing overall					
25 April; 21:02:13	(Russia) Soyuz-STA / Fregat		(France) Kourou ELS		(France) Arianespace	
25 April; 21:02:13	Sentinel-1B	ESA	Low Earth (SSO)	Earth observation	In orbit	Spacecraft failure
25 April; 21:02:13	(France) MICROSCOPE	CNES	Low Earth (SSO)	Astrophysics	In orbit	Operational
25 April; 21:02:13	⚀ (Denmark) AAUSAT-4	Aalborg	Low Earth (SSO)	AIS ship tracking	8 September 2023	Successful
25 April; 21:02:13	⚀ (Italy) e-st@r-II	Polytechnic University of Turin	Low Earth (SSO)	Technology demonstration	9 May 2024	Successful
25 April; 21:02:13	⚀ (Belgium) OUFTI-1	Liège	Low Earth (SSO)	Technology demonstration	14 March 2024	Successful
28 April; 02:01:21	(Russia) Soyuz-2.1a / Volga		(Russia) Vostochny Site 1S		(Russia) Roscosmos	
28 April; 02:01:21	(Russia) Mikhailo Lomonosov	MSU	Low Earth (SSO)	Gamma-ray astronomy	16 December 2023	Satellite malfunction
28 April; 02:01:21	(Russia) Aist-2D	SSAU	Low Earth (SSO)	Technology demonstration	15 April 2024	Successful
28 April; 02:01:21	⚀ (Russia) SamSat 218	SSAU	Low Earth (SSO)	Technology demonstration	4 March 2022	Spacecraft failure
28 April; 02:01:21	First orbital flight from Vostochny Cosmodrome.					
28 April; 07:20:00	(India) PSLV-XL	C33	(India) Satish Dhawan FLP		(India) ISRO	
28 April; 07:20:00	(India) IRNSS-1G	ISRO	Geosynchronous	Navigation	In orbit	Operational
← Jan; Feb; Mar; Apr; May; Jun; Jul; Aug; Sep; Oct; Nov; Dec →; === May ===
6 May; 05:21:00	(United States) Falcon 9 Full Thrust	F9-024	(United States) Cape Canaveral SLC-40		(United States) SpaceX	
6 May; 05:21:00	(Japan) JCSAT-14	JSAT	Geosynchronous	Communications	In orbit	Operational
6 May; 05:21:00	First stage landed on Of Course I Still Love You drone ship, the third successful landing and the first landing with a payload to geostationary transfer orbit.					
15 May; 02:43	(China) Long March 2D		(China) Jiuquan LA-4/SLS-2		(China) CASC	
15 May; 02:43	(China) Yaogan 30	CNSA	Low Earth (SSO)	Reconnaissance	In orbit	Operational
24 May; 08:48:43	(Russia) Soyuz-STB / Fregat		(France) Kourou ELS		(France) Arianespace	
24 May; 08:48:43	Galileo FOC 10	ESA	Medium Earth	Navigation	In orbit	Operational
24 May; 08:48:43	Galileo FOC 11	ESA	Medium Earth	Navigation	In orbit	Operational
27 May; 21:39:00	(United States) Falcon 9 Full Thrust	F9-025	(United States) Cape Canaveral SLC-40		(United States) SpaceX	
27 May; 21:39:00	(Thailand) Thaicom 8	Thaicom	Geosynchronous	Communications	In orbit	Operational
27 May; 21:39:00	First stage landed on Of Course I Still Love You drone ship, the fourth successful landing and the second landing with a payload to geostationary transfer orbit.					
29 May; 08:44:35	(Russia) Soyuz-2.1b / Fregat		(Russia) Plesetsk Site 43/4		(Russia) RVSN RF	
29 May; 08:44:35	(Russia) Kosmos 2516 (GLONASS-M 753)	VKS	Medium Earth	Navigation	In orbit	Spacecraft failure
29 May; 08:44:35	Kosmos 2516 experienced a depressurization event in November 2020, which permanently disabled the satellite after four years in operation. It was replaced by GLONASS-K 705.					
30 May; 03:17:04	(China) Long March 4B		(China) Taiyuan LC-9		(China) CASC	
30 May; 03:17:04	(China) Ziyuan III-02	CNSA	Low Earth (SSO)	Earth observation	In orbit	Operational
30 May; 03:17:04	(Argentina) ÑuSat-1/-2 (Aleph-1 constellation)	Satellogic	Low Earth (SSO)	Earth observation	In orbit	Operational
← Jan; Feb; Mar; Apr; May; Jun; Jul; Aug; Sep; Oct; Nov; Dec →; === June ===
4 June; 14:00:13	(Russia) Rokot / Briz-KM		(Russia) Plesetsk Site 133/3		(Russia) RVSN RF	
4 June; 14:00:13	(Russia) Kosmos 2517 (Geo-IK-2 No.12)	VKS	Low Earth	Geodesy	In orbit	Operational
9 June; 07:10:00	(Russia) Proton-M / Briz-M		(Kazakhstan) Baikonur Site 81/24		(Russia) (United States) International Launch Services	
9 June; 07:10:00	(United States) Intelsat 31 / DLA-2	Intelsat / DirecTV	Geosynchronous	Communications	In orbit	Operational
11 June; 17:51:00	(United States) Delta IV Heavy		(United States) Cape Canaveral SLC-37B		(United States) United Launch Alliance	
11 June; 17:51:00	(United States) USA-268 (Orion 9)	NRO	Geosynchronous	Reconnaissance	In orbit	Operational
11 June; 17:51:00	NROL-37 mission.					
12 June; 15:30:04	(China) Long March 3C/E		(China) Xichang LC-3		(China) CASC	
12 June; 15:30:04	(China) BeiDou G7	CNSA	Geosynchronous	Navigation	In orbit	Operational
15 June; 14:29:00	(United States) Falcon 9 Full Thrust	F9-026	(United States) Cape Canaveral SLC-40		(United States) SpaceX	
15 June; 14:29:00	(France) Eutelsat 117 West B	Eutelsat	Geosynchronous	Communications	In orbit	Operational
15 June; 14:29:00	(Bermuda) ABS-2A	ABS	Geosynchronous	Communications	In orbit	Operational
15 June; 14:29:00	Satellites were successfully delivered to orbit, first stage landing on drone ship failed.					
18 June; 21:38:39	(France) Ariane 5 ECA	VA230	(France) Kourou ELA-3		(France) Arianespace	
18 June; 21:38:39	(United States) EchoStar 18	EchoStar	Geosynchronous	Communications	In orbit	Operational
18 June; 21:38:39	(Indonesia) BRIsat	BRI	Geosynchronous	Communications	In orbit	Operational
22 June; 03:56:00	(India) PSLV-XL	C34	(India) Satish Dhawan SLP		(India) ISRO	
22 June; 03:56:00	(India) Cartosat-2C	ISRO	Low Earth (SSO)	Earth observation	In orbit	Operational
22 June; 03:56:00	(Germany) BIROS	DLR	Low Earth (SSO)	Earth observation	In orbit	Operational
22 June; 03:56:00	(Canada) GHGSat-D (Claire)	GHGSat	Low Earth (SSO)	Earth observation	In orbit	Operational
22 June; 03:56:00	(Indonesia) LAPAN-A3	LAPAN	Low Earth (SSO)	Earth observation	In orbit	Operational
22 June; 03:56:00	(Canada) M3MSat	CSA	Low Earth (SSO)	Communications	In orbit	Operational
22 June; 03:56:00	(United States) SkySat-C1	Terra Bella	Low Earth (SSO)	Earth observation	In orbit	Operational
22 June; 03:56:00	⚀ (Germany) BeeSat 4	TU Berlin	Low Earth (SSO)	Technology demonstration	In orbit	Operational
22 June; 03:56:00	⚀ (United States) Flock-2p × 12	Planet Labs	Low Earth (SSO)	Earth observation	First: 20 October 2022; Last: 28 March 2023	Successful
22 June; 03:56:00	⚀ (India) SathyabamaSat	Sathyabama University	Low Earth (SSO)	Earth observation	In orbit	Operational
22 June; 03:56:00	⚀ (India) Swayam	College of Engineering, Pune	Low Earth (SSO)	Technology demonstration	In orbit	Operational
24 June; 14:30:00	(United States) Atlas V 551	AV-063	(United States) Cape Canaveral SLC-41		(United States) United Launch Alliance	
24 June; 14:30:00	(United States) MUOS-5	US Navy	GSO	Communications	In orbit	Operational in off-nominal but usable orbit
25 June; 12:00:07	(China) Long March 7 / YZ-1A	Y1	(China) Wenchang LC-2		(China) CASC	
25 June; 12:00:07	(China) Next-generation crew capsule scale model	CMSA	Low Earth	Technology demonstration Flight test	26 June 2016; 07:41	Successful
25 June; 12:00:07	⚀ (China) Star of Aoxiang	NPU	Low Earth	Technology demonstration	29 September 2016	Successful
25 June; 12:00:07	(China) Aolong-1	CALT	Low Earth	Technology demonstration	27 August 2016	Successful
25 June; 12:00:07	(China) Tiange-1		Low Earth	Technology demonstration	27 August 2016	Successful
25 June; 12:00:07	(China) Tiange-2		Low Earth	Technology demonstration	24 August 2016	Successful
25 June; 12:00:07	Maiden flight of the Long March 7 rocket and the first launch from the Wenchang Satellite Launch Center.					
29 June; 03:21:04	(China) Long March 4B		(China) Jiuquan LA-4/SLS-2		(China) CASC	
29 June; 03:21:04	(China) Shijian 16-02	CNSA	Low Earth	Technology demonstration	In orbit	Operational
← Jan; Feb; Mar; Apr; May; Jun; Jul; Aug; Sep; Oct; Nov; Dec →; === July ===
7 July; 01:36:40	(Russia) Soyuz-FG		(Kazakhstan) Baikonur Site 1/5		(Russia) Roscosmos	
7 July; 01:36:40	(Russia) Soyuz MS-01	Roscosmos	Low Earth (ISS)	Expedition 48/49	30 October 2016; 03:58	Successful
7 July; 01:36:40	Crewed flight with three cosmonauts. Maiden flight of the modernized Soyuz MS spacecraft variant.					
16 July; 21:41:45	(Russia) Soyuz-U		(Kazakhstan) Baikonur Site 31/6		(Russia) Roscosmos	
16 July; 21:41:45	(Russia) Progress MS-03 / 64P	Roscosmos	Low Earth (ISS)	ISS logistics	1 February 2017; 18:24	Successful
18 July; 04:45:29	(United States) Falcon 9 Full Thrust	F9-027	(United States) Cape Canaveral SLC-40		(United States) SpaceX	
18 July; 04:45:29	(United States) SpaceX CRS-9	NASA	Low Earth (ISS)	ISS logistics	26 August; 15:47	Successful
18 July; 04:45:29	Delivering the IDA-2 segment of the NASA Docking System. Second successful return to launch site and vertical landing of a first stage, demonstrated as part of a controlled descent test.					
28 July; 12:37:00	(United States) Atlas V 421	AV-065	(United States) Cape Canaveral SLC-41		(United States) United Launch Alliance	
28 July; 12:37:00	(United States) USA-269 (Quasar NROL-61)	NRO	Geosynchronous	Communications	In orbit	Operational
← Jan; Feb; Mar; Apr; May; Jun; Jul; Aug; Sep; Oct; Nov; Dec →; === August ===
5 August; 16:22:04	(China) Long March 3B		(China) Xichang LC-3		(China) CASC	
5 August; 16:22:04	(China) Tiantong-1 01	CAST	Geosynchronous	Communications	In orbit	Operational
9 August; 22:55:25	(China) Long March 4C		(China) Taiyuan LC-9		(China) CASC	
9 August; 22:55:25	(China) Gaofen-3	CAST	Low Earth (SSO)	Earth observation	In orbit	Operational
14 August; 05:26:00	(United States) Falcon 9 Full Thrust	F9-028	(United States) Cape Canaveral SLC-40		(United States) SpaceX	
14 August; 05:26:00	(Japan) JCSAT-16	JSAT	Geosynchronous	Communications	In orbit	Operational
15 August; 17:40:04	(China) Long March 2D		(China) Jiuquan LA-4/SLS-2		(China) CASC	
15 August; 17:40:04	(China) Quantum Experiments At Space Scale (QUESS)	CAS	Low Earth (SSO)	Technology demonstration	In orbit	Operational
15 August; 17:40:04	(China) Lixing-1	CAS	Low Earth (SSO)	Technology demonstration	19 August 2016	Spacecraft failure
15 August; 17:40:04	⚀ (Spain) ^{3}Cat 2	UPC	Low Earth (SSO)	Technology demonstration	18 December 2023	Successful
19 August; 04:52:00	(United States) Delta IV M+ (4,2)		(United States) Cape Canaveral SLC-37B		(United States) United Launch Alliance	
19 August; 04:52:00	(United States) AFSPC 6 / USA-270 / GSSAP #3	US Air Force	Geosynchronous	Space surveillance	In orbit	Operational
19 August; 04:52:00	(United States) AFSPC 6 / USA-271 / GSSAP #4	US Air Force	Geosynchronous	Space surveillance	In orbit	Operational
24 August; 22:16:01	(France) Ariane 5 ECA	VA232	(France) Kourou ELA-3		(France) Arianespace	
24 August; 22:16:01	(United States) Intelsat 33e	Intelsat	Geosynchronous	Communications	In orbit	Operational
24 August; 22:16:01	(United States) Intelsat 36	Intelsat	Geosynchronous	Communications	In orbit	Operational
31 August; 18:50:00	(China) Long March 4C		(China) Taiyuan LC-9		(China) CASC	
31 August; 18:50:00	(China) Gaofen-10	CAST	Low Earth (SSO)	Earth observation	31 August 2016	Launch failure
← Jan; Feb; Mar; Apr; May; Jun; Jul; Aug; Sep; Oct; Nov; Dec →; === September ===
3 September; 07:00–09:00 (scheduled)	(United States) Falcon 9 Full Thrust		(United States) Cape Canaveral SLC-40		(United States) SpaceX	
3 September; 07:00–09:00 (scheduled)	(Israel) AMOS-6	Spacecom	Planned: Geosynchronous	Communications	N/A	Destroyed prior to launch
3 September; 07:00–09:00 (scheduled)	Launch pad explosion destroyed both the rocket and the satellite two days prior to scheduled launch, on 13:07, 1 September 2016 (UTC).					
8 September; 11:20:00	(India) GSLV Mk II	F05	(India) Satish Dhawan SLP		(India) ISRO	
8 September; 11:20:00	(India) INSAT-3DR	ISRO	Geosynchronous	Meteorology	In orbit	Operational
8 September; 23:05:00	(United States) Atlas V 411	AV-067	(United States) Cape Canaveral SLC-41		(United States) United Launch Alliance	
8 September; 23:05:00	(United States) OSIRIS-REx (OSIRIS-APEX)	NASA	Heliocentric	Asteroid sample return	In orbit	Operational
8 September; 23:05:00	Reached asteroid Bennu in December 2018. Scheduled to return to Earth in September 2023.					
13 September; 14:38:00	(Israel) Shavit-2		(Israel) Palmachim		Israel Aerospace Industries	
13 September; 14:38:00	(Israel) Ofeq 11	Israel Defense Forces	Low Earth	Reconnaissance	In orbit	Satellite malfunction
15 September; 14:04:12	(China) Long March 2F/G	T2	(China) Jiuquan LA-4/SLS-1		(China) CNSA	
15 September; 14:04:12	(China) Tiangong-2	CMSA	Low Earth	Space station	19 July 2019; 13:06	Successful
15 September; 14:04:12	(China) BanXing 2	SAST	Low Earth	Technology demonstration	15 July 2019	Successful
15 September; 14:04:12	Second Chinese space laboratory, BanXing 2 deployed 22 October					
16 September; 01:43:35	(Italy) Vega		(France) Kourou ELV		(France) Arianespace	
16 September; 01:43:35	(Peru) PeruSat-1	Peruvian Armed Forces	Low Earth (SSO)	Reconnaissance	In orbit	Operational
16 September; 01:43:35	(United States) SkySat × 4	Terra Bella	Low Earth (SSO)	Earth observation	In orbit	Operational
26 September; 03:42:00	(India) PSLV-G	C35	(India) Satish Dhawan FLP		(India) ISRO	
26 September; 03:42:00	(India) ScatSat-1	ISRO	Low Earth (SSO)	Meteorology	In orbit	Successful
26 September; 03:42:00	(Algeria) Alsat-1B	Algerian Space Agency	Low Earth (SSO)	Earth observation	In orbit	Operational
26 September; 03:42:00	(Algeria) Alsat-2B	Algerian Space Agency	Low Earth (SSO)	Earth observation	In orbit	Operational
26 September; 03:42:00	(United States) Blacksky Pathfinder-1	BlackSky Global	Low Earth (SSO)	Earth observation	In orbit	Operational
26 September; 03:42:00	(India) Pratham	IIT Bombay	Low Earth (SSO)	Technology demonstration	In orbit	Operational
26 September; 03:42:00	(India) PISat	PES University	Low Earth (SSO)	Earth observation	In orbit	Operational
26 September; 03:42:00	⚀ (Algeria) Alsat-1N	Algerian Space Agency	Low Earth (SSO)	Earth observation	In orbit	Operational
26 September; 03:42:00	⚀ (Canada) CanX-7	UTIAS Space Flight Laboratory	Low Earth (SSO)	Technology demonstration	21 April 2022	Successful
26 September; 03:42:00	Final launch of the original Polar Satellite Launch Vehicle PSLV-G configuration with S9 solid rocket motors.					
← Jan; Feb; Mar; Apr; May; Jun; Jul; Aug; Sep; Oct; Nov; Dec →; === October ===
5 October; 20:30	(France) Ariane 5 ECA	VA231	(France) Kourou ELA-3		(France) Arianespace	
5 October; 20:30	(Australia) NBN-Co 1B / Sky Muster II	NBN	Geosynchronous	Communications	In orbit	Operational
5 October; 20:30	(India) GSAT-18	ISRO	Geosynchronous	Communications	In orbit	Operational
16 October; 23:30	(China) Long March 2F	Y11	(China) Jiuquan LA-4 / SLS-1		(China) CASC	
16 October; 23:30	(China) Shenzhou 11	CMSA	Low Earth	Docking with Tiangong-2	18 November 2016; 06:15	Successful
16 October; 23:30	Crewed flight with two astronauts					
17 October; 23:45	(United States) Antares 230		(United States) MARS Pad 0A		(United States) Orbital ATK	
17 October; 23:45	(United States) Cygnus CRS OA-5	NASA	Low Earth (ISS)	ISS logistics	27 November 2016; 23:36	Successful
17 October; 23:45	⚀ (United States) Lemur-2 × 4	Spire Global	Low Earth	Earth observation	In orbit	Operational
17 October; 23:45	CubeSats were deployed from the ISS and Cygnus spacecraft at a later date.					
19 October; 08:05	(Russia) Soyuz-FG		(Kazakhstan) Baikonur Site 31/6		(Russia) Roscosmos	
19 October; 08:05	(Russia) Soyuz MS-02	Roscosmos	Low Earth (ISS)	Expedition 49/50	10 April 2017; 11:20	Successful
19 October; 08:05	Crewed flight with three cosmonauts					
← Jan; Feb; Mar; Apr; May; Jun; Jul; Aug; Sep; Oct; Nov; Dec →; === November ===
2 November; 06:20:00	(Japan) H-IIA 202	F31	(Japan) Tanegashima LA-Y1		(Japan) MHI	
2 November; 06:20:00	(Japan) Himawari 9	JMA	Geosynchronous	Meteorology	In orbit	Operational
3 November; 12:42	(China) Long March 5		(China) Wenchang LC-1		(China) CASC	
3 November; 12:42	(China) Shijian 17	CNSA	Geosynchronous	Technology demonstration / Space rendezvous	In orbit	Operational
3 November; 12:42	Maiden flight of the Long March 5 rocket. Chinese state media claims Shijian-17 is a test of electric propulsion, though this is disputed by outside analysts tracking the satellite's unusual space rendezvous movements.					
9 November; 23:42	(China) Long March 11		(China) Jiuquan LS-95A		(China) CASC	
9 November; 23:42	(China) XPNAV 1	CAS	Low Earth (SSO)	X-ray pulsar-based navigation	In orbit	Operational
9 November; 23:42	⚀ (China) Xiaoxiang 1	Changsha Gaoxinqu Tianyi Research Institute	Low Earth (SSO)	Technology demonstration	In orbit	Operational
9 November; 23:42	⚀ (China) Lishui 1-01	Zhejiang LiTong Electronic Technology Co.	Low Earth (SSO)	Earth observation	In orbit	Operational
9 November; 23:42	⚀ (China) Pina-2 × 2		Low Earth (SSO)	Technology demonstration	In orbit	Operational
11 November; 18:30	(United States) Atlas V 401	AV-062	(United States) Vandenberg SLC-3E		(United States) United Launch Alliance	
11 November; 18:30	(United States) WorldView-4	DigitalGlobe	Low Earth (SSO)	Earth observation	30 November 2021; 05:20	Spacecraft failure
11 November; 18:30	⚀ (United States) CELTEE 1	M42 Technologies	Low Earth (SSO)	Calibration	In orbit	Operational
11 November; 18:30	⚀ (United States) Prometheus-2 × 2	LANL	Low Earth (SSO)	Technology demonstration	In orbit	Operational
11 November; 18:30	⚀ (United States) AeroCube 8 × 2	Aerospace	Low Earth (SSO)	Technology demonstration	In orbit	Operational
11 November; 18:30	⚀ (United States) OptiCube 4	NASA Orbital Debris Program Office	Low Earth (SSO)	Calibration	In orbit	Operational
11 November; 18:30	⚀ (United States) RAVAN	JHU/APL	Low Earth (SSO)	Technology demonstration / Earth observation	In orbit	Operational
11 November; 18:30	CubeSats deployed after WorldView-4 separation as part of NRO-sponsored ENTERPRISE mission. WorldView-4 experienced a failure in one of its control moment gyroscopes in January 2019, making the spacecraft unrecoverable.					
11 November; 23:14	(China) Long March 2D		(China) Jiuquan LA-4/SLS-2		(China) CASC	
11 November; 23:14	(China) Yunhai-1	SAST	Low Earth	Earth observation	In orbit	Operational
17 November; 13:06:48	(France) Ariane 5 ES	VA233	(France) Kourou ELA-3		(France) Arianespace	
17 November; 13:06:48	Galileo FOC 7	ESA	Medium Earth	Navigation	In orbit	Operational
17 November; 13:06:48	Galileo FOC 12	ESA	Medium Earth	Navigation	In orbit	Operational
17 November; 13:06:48	Galileo FOC 13	ESA	Medium Earth	Navigation	In orbit	Operational
17 November; 13:06:48	Galileo FOC 14	ESA	Medium Earth	Navigation	In orbit	Operational
17 November; 13:06:48	First Galileo launch with Ariane 5 (8th overall), carrying Antonianna, Lisa, Kimberley, and Tijmen.					
17 November; 20:20:14	(Russia) Soyuz-FG		(Kazakhstan) Baikonur Site 1/5		(Russia) Roscosmos	
17 November; 20:20:14	(Russia) Soyuz MS-03	Roscosmos	Low Earth (ISS)	Expedition 50/51/52	2 June 2017	Successful
17 November; 20:20:14	Crewed flight with three cosmonauts. Peggy Whitson's mission was prolonged over Expedition 52 until September 2017.					
19 November; 23:42:00	(United States) Atlas V 541	AV-069	(United States) Cape Canaveral SLC-41		(United States) United Launch Alliance	
19 November; 23:42:00	(United States) GOES-R (GOES-16)	NASA / NOAA	Geosynchronous	Meteorology	In orbit	Operational
22 November; 15:24:04	(China) Long March 3C/E		(China) Xichang LC-2		(China) CASC	
22 November; 15:24:04	(China) Tianlian I-04	CNSA	Geosynchronous	Communications	In orbit	Operational
← Jan; Feb; Mar; Apr; May; Jun; Jul; Aug; Sep; Oct; Nov; Dec →; === December ===
1 December; 14:52	(Russia) Soyuz-U		(Kazakhstan) Baikonur Site 1/5		(Russia) Roscosmos	
1 December; 14:52	(Russia) Progress MS-04 / 65P	Roscosmos	Planned: Low Earth (ISS)	ISS logistics	1 December	Launch failure
5 December; 13:51:44	(Italy) Vega		(France) Kourou ELV		(France) Arianespace	
5 December; 13:51:44	(Turkey) Göktürk-1	Turkish Armed Forces	Low Earth (SSO)	Reconnaissance	In orbit	Operational
7 December; 04:54	(India) PSLV-XL	C36	(India) Satish Dhawan FLP		(India) ISRO	
7 December; 04:54	(India) Resourcesat-2A	ISRO	Low Earth (SSO)	Remote sensing	In orbit	Operational
7 December; 23:53	(United States) Delta IV M+ (5,4)		(United States) Cape Canaveral SLC-37B		(United States) United Launch Alliance	
7 December; 23:53	(United States) USA-272 / WGS-8	US Air Force	Geosynchronous	Communications	In orbit	Operational
9 December; 13:26:47	(Japan) H-IIB	F6	(Japan) Tanegashima LA-Y2		(Japan) MHI	
9 December; 13:26:47	(Japan) HTV-6	JAXA	Low Earth (ISS)	ISS logistics	5 February 2017; 15:06	Successful
9 December; 13:26:47	⚀ (Japan) EGG	UTokyo	Low Earth	Technology demonstration / Re-entry Demonstration	15 May 2017	Successful
9 December; 13:26:47	⚀ (Italy) TuPOD	GAUSS Srl	Low Earth	TubeSat Deployment / Amateur radio	8 September 2017	Successful
9 December; 13:26:47	⚀ (Singapore) / (Japan) AOBA-VELOX 3	NTU / Kyutech	Low Earth	Technology demonstration	1 November 2018	Successful
9 December; 13:26:47	⚀ (Japan) STARS C	Kagawa University	Low Earth	Technology demonstration	3 March 2018	Successful
9 December; 13:26:47	⚀ (Japan) FREEDOM	Nakashimada Engineering Works / Tohoku University	Low Earth	Technology demonstration	5 February 2017	Successful
9 December; 13:26:47	⚀ (Japan) ITF-2	University of Tsukuba	Low Earth	Technology demonstration	3 January 2019	Successful
9 December; 13:26:47	⚀ (Japan) Waseda-SAT 3	Waseda University	Low Earth	Technology demonstration	6 October 2018	Successful
9 December; 13:26:47	(United States) OSNSAT	Open Space Network	Low Earth	Technology demonstration	11 January 2018	Successful
9 December; 13:26:47	(Brazil) Tancredo-1	Escola Municipal Presidente Tancredo de Almeida Neves/INPE	Low Earth	Technology demonstration	18 October 2017	Successful
9 December; 13:26:47	⚀ (United States) TechEdSat 5	SJSU/UI	Low Earth	Technology demonstration	29 July 2017	Successful
9 December; 13:26:47	⚀ (United States) Lemur-2 × 4	Spire Global	Low Earth	AIS	First: 15 April 2018; Last: 5 December 2018	Successful
9 December; 13:26:47	CubeSats to be deployed at a later date. Tancredo-1 and OSNSAT are carried inside TuPOD and to be deployed from it. STARS-C was deployed on 19 December 2016. ITF-2, WASEDA-SAT3, FREEDOM, EGG, AOBA-Velox III, and TuPOD were deployed on 16 January 2017. Tancredo-1 and OSNSAT were released from TuPOD on 19 January 2017. Lemur-2 and TechEdSat-5 were deployed on 6–7 March 2017.					
10 December; 16:11:00	(China) Long March 3B		(China) Xichang LC-3		(China) CASC	
10 December; 16:11:00	(China) Fengyun 4A	CMA	Geosynchronous	Meteorology	In orbit	Operational
15 December; 13:37:21	(United States) Pegasus-XL		(United States) Stargazer, Cape Canaveral		(United States) Orbital ATK	
15 December; 13:37:21	(United States) CYGNSS × 8	NASA	Low Earth	Meteorology	In orbit	Operational
18 December; 19:13	(United States) Atlas V 431	AV-071	(United States) Cape Canaveral SLC-41		(United States) United Launch Alliance	
18 December; 19:13	(United States) EchoStar 19	HughesNet	Geosynchronous	Communications	In orbit	Operational
20 December; 11:00	(Japan) Epsilon	Epsilon-2	(Japan) Uchinoura		(Japan) JAXA	
20 December; 11:00	(Japan) Arase (ERG)	JAXA	Medium Earth (elliptical)	Magnetospherics	In orbit	Operational
21 December; 19:22	(China) Long March 2D		(China) Jiuquan LA-4/SLS-2		(China) CASC	
21 December; 19:22	(China) TanSat	CAS	Low Earth (SSO)	Earth observation	In orbit	Operational
21 December; 19:22	(China) Spark × 2	CAS	Low Earth (SSO)	Earth observation	In orbit	Operational
21 December; 20:30	(France) Ariane 5 ECA	VA234	(France) Kourou ELA-3		(France) Arianespace	
21 December; 20:30	(Brazil) Star One D1	Star One	Geosynchronous	Communications	In orbit	Operational
21 December; 20:30	(Japan) JCSAT-15	JSAT	Geosynchronous	Communications	In orbit	Operational
28 December; 03:23:56	(China) Long March 2D		(China) Taiyuan		(China) CASC	
28 December; 03:23:56	(China) SuperView / Gaojing-1 01	Beijing Space View Technology	Low Earth (SSO)	Earth observation	In orbit	Partial launch failure; Operational
28 December; 03:23:56	(China) SuperView / Gaojing-1 02	Beijing Space View Technology	Low Earth (SSO)	Earth observation	In orbit	Partial launch failure; Operational
28 December; 03:23:56	⚀ (China) Bayi Kepu 1	China Association for Science and Technology	Low Earth (SSO)	Technology demonstration	18 February 2017	Partial launch failure; Successful
28 December; 03:23:56	Launch vehicle problem deployed satellites in a lower than planned orbit. SuperView satellites raising their own orbits, but CubeSats cannot so may have short lifespan.					

- ← Jan
- Feb
- Mar
- Apr
- May
- Jun
- Jul
- Aug
- Sep
- Oct
- Nov
- Dec →

== Suborbital flights ==
Date and time (UTC)	Rocket	Flight number	Launch site		LSP	
Date and time (UTC)	Payload (⚀ = CubeSat)	Operator	Orbit	Function	Decay (UTC)	Outcome
Date and time (UTC)	Remarks					
15 January; 03:00:00	(Japan) S-310		(Japan) Uchinoura		(Japan) JAXA	
15 January; 03:00:00	(Japan)	TPU / Tohoku University / Tokai University / KU / JAXA	Suborbital	Ionospheric research	15 January	Successful
15 January; 03:00:00	Apogee: 161 kilometres (100 mi)					
22 January	(United States) New Shepard		(United States) Corn Ranch		(United States) Blue Origin	
22 January	(United States) New Shepard crew capsule	Blue Origin	Suborbital	Test flight	22 January	Successful
22 January	Apogee: 101.7 kilometres (63.2 mi)					
23 January; 08:30	(Brazil) VSB-30		(Sweden) Esrange		(Europe) EuroLaunch	
23 January; 08:30	(Germany) / TEXUS-53	DLR / ESA	Suborbital	Microgravity	23 January	Successful
23 January; 08:30	Apogee: 252 kilometres (157 mi)					
28 January	(United States) SRALT?		(United States) C-17, Pacific Ocean		(United States) MDA	
28 January		MDA	Suborbital	ABM target	28 January	Successful
28 January	Apogee: 300 kilometres (190 mi), CTV-02+ target					
28 January	(United States) Ground Based Interceptor		(United States) Vandenberg LF-23		(United States) MDA	
28 January		MDA	Suborbital	ABM test	28 January	Successful
28 January	CTV-02+, successful test flight, the CE-II kill vehicle performed scripted maneuvers to demonstrate performance of alternate divert thrusters. Upon entering terminal phase, the kill vehicle initiated a planned burn sequence to evaluate the alternate divert thrusters until fuel was exhausted, intentionally precluding an intercept.					
2 February; 21:09	(Brazil) VS-30		(Sweden) Esrange		(Sweden) SSC	
2 February; 21:09	(Sweden) SPIDER/LEEWAVES	SSC	Suborbital	Technology	2 February	Successful
2 February; 21:09	Apogee: 138 kilometres (86 mi)					
21 February; 07:34	(United States) LGM-30G Minuteman III		(United States) Vandenberg LF-09		(United States) US Air Force	
21 February; 07:34		US Air Force	Suborbital	Test flight	21 February	Successful
21 February; 07:34	GT217GM, Apogee: ~1,300 kilometres (810 mi) ?					
22 February; 04:15	(Canada) Black Brant IX		(United States) White Sands		(United States) NASA	
22 February; 04:15	(United States) CHESS-2	LASP	Suborbital	Astronomy	22 February	Successful
22 February; 04:15	Apogee: 309 kilometres (192 mi)					
26 February; 07:01	(United States) LGM-30G Minuteman III		(United States) Vandenberg LF-10		(United States) US Air Force	
26 February; 07:01		US Air Force	Suborbital	Test flight	26 February	Successful
26 February; 07:01	GT218GM, Apogee: ~1,300 kilometres (810 mi) ?					
1 March; 14:50	(United States) Terrier Malemute		(United States) Wallops Island		(United States) NASA	
1 March; 14:50	(United States) MUSIC	West Virginia University	Suborbital	Technology experiments	1 March	Successful
1 March; 14:50	Apogee: ~185 kilometers (115 mi)					
7 March; 12:05	(United States) Terrier Orion		(United States) Wallops Island		(United States) NASA	
7 March; 12:05	(United States) SOAREX-9	NASA Ames	Suborbital	Technology experiment	7 March	Successful
7 March; 12:05	(United States) RadPC	Montana State University	Suborbital	Technology experiment	7 March	Successful
7 March; 12:05	(United States) VIP	Controlled Dynamics	Suborbital	Technology experiment	7 March	Successful
7 March; 12:05	Apogee: ~159 kilometers (99 mi)					
7 March	(India) K-4		(India) Visakhapatnam		(India) Indian Navy	
7 March		Indian Navy	Suborbital	Missile test	7 March	Successful
7 March	Apogee: 500 km?					
8 March	(Iran) Shahab-3		Iran		(Iran) IRGC	
8 March		IRGC	Suborbital	Missile test	8 March	Successful
8 March	Apogee: ~150 kilometres (93 mi)					
14 March	(India) Agni-I		(India) Integrated Test Range		(India) IDRDL	
14 March		IDRDL	Suborbital	Missile test	14 March	Successful
14 March	Apogee: ~500 kilometres (310 mi)?					
14 March	(United States) UGM-133 Trident II D5		(United States) Submarine, ETR		(United States) US Navy	
14 March		US Navy	Suborbital	Missile test	14 March	Successful
14 March	Follow-on Commander's Evaluation Test 52					
15 March	(United States) UGM-133 Trident II D5		(United States) Submarine, ETR		(United States) US Navy	
15 March		US Navy	Suborbital	Missile test	15 March	Successful
15 March	Follow-on Commander's Evaluation Test 52					
16 March	(United States) UGM-133 Trident II D5		(United States) Submarine, ETR		(United States) US Navy	
16 March		US Navy	Suborbital	Missile test	16 March	Successful
16 March	Follow-on Commander's Evaluation Test 52					
31 March	(India) K-4		(India) INS Arihant		(India) Indian Navy	
31 March		Indian Navy	Suborbital	Missile test	31 March	Successful
31 March	First K-4 launch from a submarine					
2 April; 15:18	(United States) New Shepard		(United States) Corn Ranch		(United States) Blue Origin	
2 April; 15:18	(United States) New Shepard crew capsule	Blue Origin	Suborbital	Test flight	2 April	Successful
2 April; 15:18	(United States) BORE	Southwest Research Institute	Suborbital	Microgravity experiment	2 April	Successful
2 April; 15:18	(United States) COLLIDE	University of Central Florida	Suborbital	Microgravity experiment	2 April	Successful
2 April; 15:18	Apogee: 103.8 kilometers (64.5 mi). Third successful booster landing of the same rocket.					
19 April; 06:41	(Russia) UR-100NU		(Russia) Yasniy		(Russia) RVSN	
19 April; 06:41		RVSN	Suborbital	Missile test	19 April	Successful
19 April; 06:41	Yu-71 Hypersonic Vehicle Test, Apogee: 1,000 kilometres (620 mi)?					
26 April; 17:00	(China) Tianying 3F		(China) Hainan		(China) CNSA	
26 April; 17:00	(China) Kunpeng-1B	CSSAR	Suborbital	Environment monitoring	26 April	Successful
26 April; 17:00	Apogee: 316 kilometres (196 mi)					
18 May; 00:45	(Brazil) (United States) VS-30/Improved Orion		(Australia) Woomera Test Range		(Australia) DSTO	
18 May; 00:45	(Australia) HiFire-5B	DSTO	Suborbital	Technology	18 May	Successful
18 May; 00:45	Apogee: 278 kilometres (173 mi)					
18 May; 07:02	(United States) MRBM-T3		(United States) Kauai		(United States) MDA	
18 May; 07:02		MDA	Suborbital	Radar target	18 May	Successful
18 May; 07:02	Medium Range Ballistic Missile Target, Aegis radar target FTX-21, apogee: 300 kilometres (190 mi)?					
25 May	(United States) RIM-161 Standard Missile 3-IB		(United States) USS Hopper, Kauai		(United States) US Navy	
25 May		US Navy	Suborbital	Test flight	25 May	Successful
25 May	Apogee: 100 kilometres (62 mi)?					
26 May	(United States) RIM-161 Standard Missile 3-IB		(United States) USS Hopper, Kauai		(United States) US Navy	
26 May		US Navy	Suborbital	Test flight	26 May	Successful
26 May	Apogee: 100 kilometres (62 mi)?					
1 June; 19:00	(Canada) Black Brant IX		(United States) White Sands		(United States) NASA	
1 June; 19:00	(United States) EVE	CU Boulder	Suborbital	SDO calibration	1 June	Successful
1 June; 19:00	Apogee: 290 kilometres (180 mi)					
19 June; 14:35	(United States) New Shepard		(United States) Corn Ranch		(United States) Blue Origin	
19 June; 14:35	(United States) New Shepard crew capsule	Blue Origin	Suborbital	Test flight	19 June	Successful
19 June; 14:35	(United States) Capillary Flow Experiment	Purdue University School of Aeronautics and Astronautics	Suborbital	Microgravity experiment	19 June	Successful
19 June; 14:35	(United States) EITIC	Louisiana State University	Suborbital	Microgravity experiment	19 June	Successful
19 June; 14:35	(Germany) MEDEA	Braunschweig University of Technology	Suborbital	Microgravity experiment	19 June	Successful
19 June; 14:35	Apogee: 101 kilometers (62.8 mi). Fourth successful booster landing of the same rocket.					
21 June; 23:03	(North Korea) Hwasong-10		(North Korea) Wonsan Airport		(North Korea) Korean People's Army Strategic Force	
21 June; 23:03	(North Korea)	Korean People's Army Strategic Force	Suborbital	Missile test	21 June	Successful
21 June; 23:03	Apogee: 1,400 kilometres (870 mi).					
24 June; 10:06	(United States) Terrier Improved Orion		(United States) Wallops Island		(United States) NASA	
24 June; 10:06	(United States) RockOn/RockSat-C	CU Boulder	Suborbital	Student experiments	24 June	Successful
24 June; 10:06	Apogee: ~119 kilometres (74 mi)					
30 June; 09:43	(United States) Improved Malemute		(Norway) Andøya		(Norway) Andøya	
30 June; 09:43	(Norway) MaxiDusty 1	Oslo/Andøya	Suborbital	Atmospheric Science	30 June	Successful
30 June; 09:43	Apogee: 115 kilometres (71 mi)					
? June	(United States) UGM-133 Trident II D5		(United Kingdom) HMS Vengeance		(United Kingdom) Royal Navy	
? June		Royal Navy	Suborbital	Missile test	? June	Launch failure
? June	–					
1 July; 07:18	(France) M51		(France) Le Triomphant, Audierne Bay		(France) DGA/Marine nationale	
1 July; 07:18		DGA/Marine nationale	Suborbital	Test flight	1 July	Successful
1 July; 07:18	Apogee: 1,000 kilometres (620 mi)?					
8 July; 13:01	(United States) Improved Malemute		(Norway) Andøya		(Norway) Andøya	
8 July; 13:01	(Norway) MaxiDusty 1b	Oslo/Andøya	Suborbital	Atmospheric Science	8 July	Successful
8 July; 13:01	Apogee: 117 kilometres (73 mi)					
11 July	(Iran) Khorramshahr		(Iran) Semnan		(Iran) AFIRI	
11 July		AFIRI	Suborbital	Missile test	11 July	Launch failure
19 July; 04:05	(United States) Terrier Improved Orion		(Sweden) Esrange		(Germany) DLR	
19 July; 04:05	(Germany) ROTEX-T	DLR	Suborbital	Technology	19 July	Successful
19 July; 04:05	Apogee: 182 kilometres (113 mi)					
27 July; 18:26	(Canada) Black Brant IX		(United States) White Sands		(United States) NASA	
27 July; 18:26	(United States) Hi-C	NASA/MSFC	Suborbital	Solar research	27 July	Spacecraft failure
27 July; 18:26	Apogee: 250 kilometres (160 mi)					
17 August; 11:33	(United States) Terrier-Improved Malemute		(United States) Wallops Island		(United States) NASA	
17 August; 11:33	(United States) Rocksat-X	University of Colorado Boulder	Suborbital	Student Research	17 August	Successful
17 August; 11:33	Apogee: ~153 kilometres (95 mi)					
23 August; 20:29	(North Korea) Pukguksong-1		(North Korea) Sinpo Shipyard		(North Korea) Korean People's Army Strategic Force	
23 August; 20:29	(North Korea)	Korean People's Army Strategic Force	Suborbital	Missile test	23 August	Successful
23 August; 20:29	Apogee: about 550 kilometres (340 mi), according to South Korean military.					
25 August	(Russia) RS-24 Yars?		(Russia) Plesetsk		(Russia) RVSN	
25 August		RVSN	Suborbital	Missile test	25 August	Launch failure
31 August	(United States) UGM-133 Trident II D5		(United States) USS Maryland, ETR		(United States) US Navy	
31 August		US Navy	Suborbital	Missile test	31 August	Successful
5 September; 03:13	(North Korea) Hwasong-9 (Scud-ER)		(North Korea) Hwangju		(North Korea) Korean People's Army Strategic Force	
5 September; 03:13	(North Korea)	Korean People's Army Strategic Force	Suborbital	Missile test	5 September	Successful
5 September; 03:13	Apogee: about 200 kilometres (120 mi). 1 of 3.					
5 September; 03:13	(North Korea) Hwasong-9 (Scud-ER)		(North Korea) Hwangju		(North Korea) Korean People's Army Strategic Force	
5 September; 03:13	(North Korea)	Korean People's Army Strategic Force	Suborbital	Missile test	5 September	Successful
5 September; 03:13	Apogee: about 200 kilometres (120 mi). 2 of 3.					
5 September; 03:13	(North Korea) Hwasong-9 (Scud-ER)		(North Korea) Hwangju		(North Korea) Korean People's Army Strategic Force	
5 September; 03:13	(North Korea)	Korean People's Army Strategic Force	Suborbital	Missile test	5 September	Successful
5 September; 03:13	Apogee: about 200 kilometres (120 mi). 3 of 3.					
5 September; 09:10	(United States) LGM-30G Minuteman III		(United States) Vandenberg LF-04		(United States) US Air Force	
5 September; 09:10		US Air Force	Suborbital	Test flight	5 September	Successful
5 September; 09:10	GT219GM, Apogee: ~1,300 kilometres (810 mi) ?					
9 September	(Russia) RS-12M Topol		(Russia) Plesetsk		(Russia) RVSN	
9 September		RVSN	Suborbital	Missile test	9 September	Successful
27 September	(Russia) RSM-56 Bulava		(Russia) K-535 Yury Dolgorukiy, White Sea		(Russia) VMF	
27 September		VMF	Suborbital	Missile test	27 September	Successful
27 September	(Russia) RSM-56 Bulava		(Russia) K-535 Yury Dolgorukiy, White Sea		(Russia) VMF	
27 September		VMF	Suborbital	Missile test	27 September	Launch failure?
27 September	The second missile self destroyed "after completing the first phase of the flight", maybe intentional. It appears to be a normal practice in salvo launches. The missile probably carried mockups instead of working upper stages and warheads to save money.					
5 October; 15:37	(United States) New Shepard		(United States) Corn Ranch		(United States) Blue Origin	
5 October; 15:37	(United States) New Shepard crew capsule	Blue Origin	Suborbital	Test flight	5 October	Successful
5 October; 15:37	In-flight escape test 45 seconds after launch. Booster unexpectedly survived and reached an apogee of 93.7 kilometres (58.2 mi) before completing its fifth successful landing.					
12 October	(Russia) R-29R Volna		(Russia) K-433 Svyatoy Georgiy Pobedonosets, Sea of Okhotsk		(Russia) VMF	
12 October		VMF	Suborbital	Missile test	12 October	Successful
12 October	(Russia) R-29RMU Sineva		(Russia) K-407 Novomoskovsk, Barents Sea		(Russia) VMF	
12 October		VMF	Suborbital	Missile test	12 October	Successful
12 October	(Russia) RS-12M Topol		(Russia) Plesetsk		(Russia) RVSN	
12 October		RVSN	Suborbital	Missile test	12 October	Successful
25 October; 08:58	(Russia) UR-100NU		(Russia) Yasniy		(Russia) RVSN	
25 October; 08:58		RVSN	Suborbital	Missile test	25 October	Successful
25 October; 08:58	Yu-71 Hypersonic Vehicle Test, Apogee: 1,000 kilometres (620 mi)?					
22 November	(India) Agni-I		(India) Integrated Test Range		(India) IDRDL	
22 November		IDRDL	Suborbital	Missile test	22 November	Successful
22 November	Apogee: ~500 kilometres (310 mi)?					
6 December	(Iran) Shahab-3		Iran		(Iran) IRGC	
6 December		IRGC	Suborbital	Missile test	6 December	Successful
6 December	Apogee: ~150 kilometres (93 mi)					
8 December	(China) B-611?		(China) Shuangchengzi		(China) PLA	
8 December		PLA	Suborbital	ABM target	8 December	Successful
8 December	Target					
8 December	(China) SC-19		(China) Korla		(China) PLA	
8 December		PLA	Suborbital	ABM test	8 December	Successful
8 December	Interceptor					
15 December	(United States) MRBM	FTM-27	(United States) Kauai		(United States) MDA	
15 December		MDA	Suborbital	ABM target	15 December	Successful
15 December	FTM-27 target, successfully intercepted by two SM-6 missiles in low altitude					
15 December; 16:15	(United States) Zombie (ATACMS)	Zombie Pathfinder	(United States) White Sands		(United States) NASA	
15 December; 16:15		US Army	Suborbital	Test flight	15 December	Successful
15 December; 16:15	Apogee: 80 kilometres (50 mi)?					
26 December; 05:35	(India) Agni V		(India) Integrated Test Range Launch Complex IV		(India) DRDO	
26 December; 05:35		DRDO	Suborbital	Missile test	26 December	Successful
26 December; 05:35	Apogee: ~800 kilometres (500 mi)					

== Deep space rendezvous ==
Date (UTC)	Spacecraft	Event	Remarks
14 January	Mars Express	Flyby of Phobos	Closest approach: 53 kilometres (33 mi).
15 January	Cassini	116th flyby of Titan	Closest approach: 3,817 kilometres (2,372 mi).
31 January	Cassini	117th flyby of Titan	Closest approach: 1,400 kilometres (870 mi).
16 February	Cassini	118th flyby of Titan	Closest approach: 1,018 kilometres (633 mi).
4 April	Cassini	119th flyby of Titan	Closest approach: 990 kilometres (615 mi).
6 May	Cassini	120th flyby of Titan	Closest approach: 971 kilometres (603 mi).
7 June	Cassini	121st flyby of Titan	Closest approach: 975 kilometres (606 mi).
4 July	Juno	Orbit injection around Jupiter (jovicentric)	First solar-powered Jovian probe, second orbiter.
4 July	Mars Express	Flyby of Phobos	Closest approach: 350 kilometres (220 mi).
25 July	Cassini	122nd flyby of Titan	Closest approach: 976 kilometres (606 mi).
10 August	Cassini	123rd flyby of Titan	Closest approach: 1,599 kilometres (994 mi).
27 August	Juno	1st perijove of Jupiter	Closest approach: 2,600 kilometres (1,600 mi).
26 September	Cassini	124th flyby of Titan	Closest approach: 1,737 kilometres (1,079 mi).
30 September	Rosetta	Landing on 67P/Churyumov–Gerasimenko	Probe was programmed to deactivate its thrusters and radio transmissions after landing.
19 October	Trace Gas Orbiter (ExoMars 2016)	Orbit injection around Mars (areocentric)	
19 October	Schiaparelli (ExoMars 2016)	Landing on Mars, Meridiani Planum	Probe entered Martian atmosphere intact, but contact was lost 50 seconds before expected landing. NASA's MRO later identified the Schiaparelli crash site at coordinates 2.05°S 6.24°W, confirming the loss of the lander.
19 October	Juno	2nd perijove	Period Reduction Maneuver originally planned, but delayed due to valve issues. The maneuver was later cancelled entirely in favor of remaining in a 53-day orbit.
13 November	Cassini	125th flyby of Titan	Closest approach: 1,582 kilometres (983 mi).
16 November	Mars Express	Flyby of Phobos	Closest approach: 127 kilometres (79 mi).
29 November	Cassini	126th flyby of Titan	Closest approach: 3,223 kilometres (2,003 mi).
11 December	Juno	3rd perijove	

== Extra-vehicular activities (EVAs) ==
Start date/time	Duration	End time	Spacecraft	Crew	Remarks
15 January; 13:48	4 hours 43 minutes	18:31	Expedition 46; ISS Quest	(United States) Timothy Kopra; (United Kingdom) Tim Peake	Replaced a failed voltage regulator responsible for shutting down one of the station's eight power channels in November 2015, and routed cables in support of the installation of the International Docking Adaptor. EVA terminated two hours early due to water leakage in Kopra's helmet, but the primary task was accomplished.
3 February; 12:55	4 hours 45 minutes	17:40	Expedition 46; ISS Pirs	(Russia) Yuri Malenchenko; (Russia) Sergey Volkov	Deployed a commemorative flash drive, took samples of module exteriors, installed handrails for use in future EVAs, retrieved an astrobiology experiment, deployed a materials science experiment, and tested a tool for applying coatings to module exteriors.
19 August; 12:04	5 hours 58 minutes	18:02	Expedition 48; ISS Quest	(United States) Jeff Williams; (United States) Kate Rubins	The astronauts installed the International Docking Adapter (IDA) which was delivered by Dragon CRS-9, allowing future commercial crew spacecraft to dock with the station. This first IDA was attached to Harmony's forward port, over the existing Pressurized Mating Adapter (PMA). The EVA terminated after completing the primary objective, without completing the secondary objectives, due to a malfunction of the right earphone of Jeff Williams.
1 September; 11:53	6 hours 48 minutes	18:41	Expedition 48; ISS Quest	(United States) Jeff Williams; (United States) Kate Rubins	The crew retracted a thermal radiator which is a backup, and then installed the first pair of several high-definition cameras to monitor the traffic around the station. Then they have performed some maintenance operations.

== Space debris events ==
Date/Time (UTC)	Source object	Event type	Pieces tracked	Remarks
26 March 01:42	Hitomi	Satellite breakup	10	JAXA lost communications with the freshly launched telescope during its early commissioning phase. Meanwhile, JspOC observed 5 then 10 pieces of debris diverging from the satellite, one of them comparably sized to the main spacecraft by radar signature. Hitomi itself went into a tumble and sent short intermittent communications. The tumble was caused by a failure of the inertial reference unit mistakenly reporting the spacecraft to be spinning. As the attitude control system attempted to correct the non-existent spin, the unnecessary correction itself is believed to have caused the subsequent failures, ultimately leading to the loss of the spacecraft, 28 April. In a twist of fate, one of the secondary payloads traveling with Hitomi was ChubuSat-3, a microsatellite dedicated to monitoring global warming effects and space debris.
1 June 09:20	SL-12 R/B (#33473)	Booster breakup	20+	An ullage motor, part of a Russian Proton-M rocket that was launched in December 2008, exploded for unknown reasons.

== Orbital launch statistics ==
=== By country ===
For the purposes of this section, the yearly tally of orbital launches by country assigns each flight to the country of origin of the rocket, not to the launch services provider or the spaceport. For example, Soyuz launches by Arianespace in Kourou are counted under Russia because Soyuz-2 is a Russian rocket.

Country	Launches	Successes	Failures	Partial failures
China	22	20	1	1
France	7	7	0	0
India	7	7	0	0
Israel	1	1	0	0
Italy	2	2	0	0
Japan	4	4	0	0
North Korea	1	1	0	0
Russia	19 (Note: Includes two European Soyuz launches from Kourou, French Guiana by Arianespace)	18	1	0
United States	22 (Note: +1 pre-launch failure (AMOS 6 / Falcon 9))	22	0	0
World	85	82	2	1

=== By rocket ===
- Ariane 5
- Atlas V
- Delta II
- Delta IV
- Delta IV Heavy
- Falcon 9
- H-IIA
- H-IIB
- Long March 2
- Long March 3
- Long March 4
- Long March 5
- Long March 7
- Long March 11
- PSLV
- Soyuz-U
- Soyuz-FG
- Soyuz-2 (Russia)
- Soyuz-ST (Europe)
- Proton-M
- Rokot
- Vega
- Others

==== By family ====
Family	Country	Launches	Successes	Failures	Partial failures	Remarks
Antares	United States	1	1	0	0	
Ariane	France	7	7	0	0	
Atlas	United States	8	8	0	0	
Delta	United States	4	4	0	0	
Epsilon	Japan	1	1	0	0	
Falcon	United States	8	8	0	0	1 Pre-launch failure
GSLV	India	1	1	0	0	
H-II	Japan	3	3	0	0	
Long March	China	22	20	1	1	
Pegasus	United States	1	1	0	0	
PSLV	India	6	6	0	0	
R-7	Russia	14	13	1	0	
Shavit	Israel	1	1	0	0	
Unha	North Korea	1	1	0	0	
Universal Rocket	Russia	5	5	0	0	
Vega	Italy	2	2	0	0	

==== By type ====
Rocket	Country	Family	Launches	Successes	Failures	Partial failures	Remarks
Antares 200	United States	Antares	1	1	0	0	Maiden Flight
Ariane 5	France	Ariane	7	7	0	0	
Atlas V	United States	Atlas	8	8	0	0	
Delta IV	United States	Delta	4	4	0	0	
Epsilon	Japan	Epsilon	1	1	0	0	
Falcon 9	United States	Falcon	8	8	0	0	1 Pre-launch failure
GSLV	India	GSLV	1	1	0	0	
H-IIA	Japan	H-II	2	2	0	0	
H-IIB	Japan	H-II	1	1	0	0	
Long March 2	China	Long March	8	7	0	1	
Long March 3	China	Long March	7	7	0	0	
Long March 4	China	Long March	4	3	1	0	
Long March 5	China	Long March	1	1	0	0	Maiden flight
Long March 7	China	Long March	1	1	0	0	Maiden flight
Long March 11	China	Long March	1	1	0	0	
Pegasus XL	United States	Pegasus	1	1	0	0	
Proton	Russia	Universal Rocket	3	3	0	0	
PSLV	India	PSLV	6	6	0	0	
Shavit	Israel	Shavit	1	1	0	0	
Soyuz	Russia	R-7	6	5	1	0	
Soyuz-2	Russia	R-7	8	8	0	0	
Unha	North Korea	Unha	1	1	0	0	
UR-100	Russia	Universal Rocket	2	2	0	0	
Vega	Italy	Vega	2	2	0	0	

==== By configuration ====
Rocket	Country	Type	Launches	Successes	Failures	Partial failures	Remarks
Antares 230	United States	Antares 200	1	1	0	0	Maiden Flight
Ariane 5 ECA	France	Ariane 5	6	6	0	0	
Ariane 5 ES	France	Ariane 5	1	1	0	0	
Atlas V 401	United States	Atlas V	3	3	0	0	
Atlas V 411	United States	Atlas V	1	1	0	0	
Atlas V 421	United States	Atlas V	1	1	0	0	
Atlas V 431	United States	Atlas V	1	1	0	0	Final flight
Atlas V 541	United States	Atlas V	1	1	0	0	
Atlas V 551	United States	Atlas V	1	1	0	0	
Delta IV Medium+ (4,2)	United States	Delta IV	1	1	0	0	
Delta IV Medium+ (5,2)	United States	Delta IV	1	1	0	0	
Delta IV Medium+ (5,4)	United States	Delta IV	1	1	0	0	
Delta IV Heavy	United States	Delta IV	1	1	0	0	
Epsilon	Japan	Epsilon	1	1	0	0	
Falcon 9 v1.1	United States	Falcon 9	1	1	0	0	Final flight
Falcon 9 Full Thrust	United States	Falcon 9	7	7	0	0	1 Pre-launch failure
GSLV Mk II	India	GSLV	1	1	0	0	
H-IIA 202	Japan	H-IIA	2	2	0	0	
H-IIB	Japan	H-IIB	1	1	0	0	
Long March 2D	China	Long March 2	6	5	0	1	
Long March 2F/G	China	Long March 2	2	2	0	0	
Long March 3A	China	Long March 3	1	1	0	0	
Long March 3B/E	China	Long March 3	3	3	0	0	
Long March 3C/E	China	Long March 3	2	2	0	0	
Long March 3C/E / YZ-1	China	Long March 3	1	1	0	0	
Long March 4B	China	Long March 4	2	2	0	0	
Long March 4C	China	Long March 4	2	1	1	0	
Long March 5 / YZ-2	China	Long March 5	1	1	0	0	Maiden flight
Long March 7 / YZ-1A	China	Long March 7	1	1	0	0	Maiden flight
Long March 11	China	Long March 11	1	1	0	0	
Pegasus XL	United States	Pegasus XL	1	1	0	0	
Proton-M / Briz-M	Russia	Proton	3	3	0	0	
PSLV-G	India	PSLV	1	1	0	0	
PSLV-XL	India	PSLV	5	5	0	0	
Rokot / Briz-KM	Russia	UR-100	2	2	0	0	
Shavit-2	Israel	Shavit	1	1	0	0	
Soyuz-2.1a or ST-A	Russia	Soyuz-2	2	2	0	0	
Soyuz-2.1a or ST-A / Fregat-M	Russia	Soyuz-2	1	1	0	0	
Soyuz-2.1a / Volga	Russia	Soyuz-2	1	1	0	0	Maiden flight
Soyuz-2.1b or ST-B	Russia	Soyuz-2	1	1	0	0	
Soyuz-2.1b or ST-B / Fregat-M	Russia	Soyuz-2	2	2	0	0	
Soyuz-2.1b or ST-B / Fregat-MT	Russia	Soyuz-2	1	1	0	0	
Soyuz-FG	Russia	Soyuz	4	4	0	0	
Soyuz-U	Russia	Soyuz	2	1	1	0	
Unha-3	North Korea	Unha	1	1	0	0	
Vega	Italy	Vega	2	2	0	0	

=== By spaceport ===
- Jiuquan
- Taiyuan
- Wenchang
- Xichang
- Kourou
- Satish Dhawan
- Palmachim
- Tanegashima
- Uchinoura
- Baikonur
- Sohae
- Plesetsk
- Vostochny
- Cape Canaveral
- Kennedy
- MARS
- Vandenberg

Site	Country	Launches	Successes	Failures	Partial failures	Remarks
Baikonur	Kazakhstan	11	10	1	0	
Cape Canaveral	United States	18	18	0	0	1 Pre-launch failure
Jiuquan	China	9	9	0	0	
Kourou	France	11	11	0	0	
MARS	United States	1	1	0	0	
Palmachim	Israel	1	1	0	0	
Plesetsk	Russia	5	5	0	0	
Satish Dhawan	India	7	7	0	0	
Sohae	North Korea	1	1	0	0	
Taiyuan	China	4	2	1	1	
Tanegashima	Japan	3	3	0	0	
Uchinoura	Japan	1	1	0	0	
Vandenberg	United States	3	3	0	0	
Vostochny	Russia	1	1	0	0	First launch
Wenchang	China	2	2	0	0	First launch
Xichang	China	7	7	0	0	
Total		85	82	2	1	

=== By orbit ===
- Transatmospheric
- Low Earth
- Low Earth (ISS)
- Low Earth (SSO)
- Low Earth (retrograde)
- Medium Earth
- Geosychronous
  (transfer)
- Inclined GSO
- High Earth
- Heliocentric

Orbital regime	Launches	Achieved	Not achieved	Accidentally achieved	Remarks
Transatmospheric	0	0	0	0	
Low Earth	43	42	2	0	Including 11 to ISS (+1 failed), 1 to Tiangong-2
Geosynchronous / transfer	32	32	0	0	
Medium Earth	8	8	0	0	
High Earth	0	0	0	0	
Heliocentric orbit	2	2	0	0	Including planetary transfer orbits
Total	85	83	2	0	
