= List of foreign satellites launched by India =

This is a list of all the foreign satellites launched by India. India has launched 434 satellites for 36 countries as of 24 December, 2025. As of 2026, India's national space agency ISRO, and Skyroot Aerospace are the only launch-capable organisations in India.

Commercial launches for foreign nations are negotiated through NSIL (previously through Antrix Corporation), the commercial arm of ISRO. Between 2013 and 2015, India launched 28 foreign satellites for nine countries, earning revenue of US$101 million.

On 15 February 2017, ISRO launched 104 satellites on single launch by a PSLV-XL. 96 of them were from the United States, while the others were from Israel, the UAE, Kazakhstan, the Netherlands, Belgium and Germany. It was the largest number of satellites launched on a single flight by any space agency (with the previous record held by Russia's Dnepr launcher, which launched 37 in June 2014) until 24 January 2021, when SpaceX launched the Transporter-1 mission on a Falcon 9 rocket carrying 143 satellites into orbit.

== 1990s ==
No.	Satellite	Country	Launch date	Launch mass	Launch vehicle	Remarks
1	DLR-Tubsat	Germany	26 May 1999	45 kg	PSLV-C2	ISRO's 1st commercial launch with foreign satellites as payload. India's Oceansat-1 was also launched. This was PSLV's 3rd launch overall.
2	Kitsat-3	Republic of Korea	26 May 1999	110 kg	PSLV-C2	ISRO's 1st commercial launch with foreign satellites as payload. India's Oceansat-1 was also launched. This was PSLV's 3rd launch overall.

== 2000s ==
No.	Satellite	Country	Launch date	Launch mass	Launch vehicle	Remarks
3	BIRD	Germany	22 October 2001	92 kg	PSLV-C3	ISRO's 2nd commercial launch.
4	PROBA	Belgium	22 October 2001	94 kg	PSLV-C3	ISRO's 2nd commercial launch.
5	Lapan-TUBsat	Indonesia	10 January 2007	56 kg	PSLV-C7	
6	Pehuensat-1	Argentina	10 January 2007	6 kg	PSLV-C7	
7	AGILE	Italy	23 April 2007	352 kg	PSLV-C8	PSLV's 11th flight.
8	TecSAR	Israel	21 January 2008	295 kg	PSLV-C10	PSLV's 12th launch.
9	CAN-X2	Canada	28 April 2008	3.5 kg	PSLV-C9	ISRO launched 10 satellites, of which 8 were foreign.
10	NLS-5	Canada	28 April 2008	6.5 kg	PSLV-C9	ISRO launched 10 satellites, of which 8 were foreign.
11	Delfi-C3	Netherlands	28 April 2008	2.2 kg	PSLV-C9	ISRO launched 10 satellites, of which 8 were foreign.
12	AAUSAT-II	Denmark	28 April 2008	0.75 kg	PSLV-C9	ISRO launched 10 satellites, of which 8 were foreign.
13	COMPASS-1	Germany	28 April 2008	1 kg	PSLV-C9	ISRO launched 10 satellites, of which 8 were foreign.
14	Rubin-8	Germany	28 April 2008	8 kg	PSLV-C9	ISRO launched 10 satellites, of which 8 were foreign.
15	CUTE-1.7	Japan	28 April 2008	3 kg	PSLV-C9	ISRO launched 10 satellites, of which 8 were foreign.
16	SEEDS-2	Japan	28 April 2008	1 kg	PSLV-C9	ISRO launched 10 satellites, of which 8 were foreign.
17	UWE-2	Germany	23 September 2009	1 kg	PSLV-C14	ISRO launched 7 satellites, of which 6 were foreign.
18	BeeSat-1	Germany	23 September 2009	1 kg	PSLV-C14	ISRO launched 7 satellites, of which 6 were foreign.
19	RUBIN-9.1	Germany; Luxembourg*	23 September 2009	8 kg	PSLV-C14	ISRO launched 7 satellites, of which 6 were foreign.
20	RUBIN-9.2	Germany; Luxembourg*	23 September 2009	8 kg	PSLV-C14	ISRO launched 7 satellites, of which 6 were foreign.
21	ITUpSAT1	Turkey	23 September 2009	1 kg	PSLV-C14	ISRO launched 7 satellites, of which 6 were foreign.
22	SwissCube-1	Switzerland	23 September 2009	1 kg	PSLV-C14	ISRO launched 7 satellites, of which 6 were foreign.

== 2010s ==
No.	Satellite	Country	Launch date	Launch mass	Launch vehicle	Remarks
23	Alsat-2A	Algeria	12 July 2010	116 kg	PSLV-C15	ISRO launched 5 satellites, of which 3 were foreign.
24	AISSat-1	Norway	12 July 2010	6.5 kg	PSLV-C15	ISRO launched 5 satellites, of which 3 were foreign.
25	TIsat-1	Switzerland	12 July 2010	1 kg	PSLV-C15	ISRO launched 5 satellites, of which 3 were foreign.
26	X-SAT	Singapore	20 April 2011	106 kg	PSLV-C16	ISRO launched 3 satellites, of which 1 was foreign.
27	VESSELSAT-1	Luxembourg	12 October 2011	28.7 kg	PSLV-C18	ISRO launched 4 satellites, of which 1 was foreign.
28	SPOT-6	France	9 September 2012	712 kg	PSLV-C21	PSLV's 22nd flight.
29	PROITERES	Japan	9 September 2012	15 kg	PSLV-C21	PSLV's 22nd flight.
30	Sapphire	Canada	25 February 2013	148 kg	PSLV-C20	ISRO launched 7 satellites, of which 6 were foreign.
31	NEOSSat	Canada	25 February 2013	74 kg	PSLV-C20	ISRO launched 7 satellites, of which 6 were foreign.
32	TUGSAT-1	Austria	25 February 2013	14 kg each	PSLV-C20	ISRO launched 7 satellites, of which 6 were foreign.
33	UniBRITE-1	Austria	25 February 2013	14 kg each	PSLV-C20	ISRO launched 7 satellites, of which 6 were foreign.
34	AAUSAT3	Denmark	25 February 2013	3 kg	PSLV-C20	ISRO launched 7 satellites, of which 6 were foreign.
35	STRaND-1	United Kingdom	25 February 2013	6.5 kg	PSLV-C20	ISRO launched 7 satellites, of which 6 were foreign.
36	SPOT-7	France	30 June 2014	714 kg	PSLV-C23	PSLV's 10th flight in 'core-alone' configuration (i.e. without the use of solid strap-on motors).
37	AISAT	Germany	30 June 2014	14 kg	PSLV-C23	PSLV's 10th flight in 'core-alone' configuration (i.e. without the use of solid strap-on motors).
38	CanX-4	Canada	30 June 2014	15 kg each	PSLV-C23	PSLV's 10th flight in 'core-alone' configuration (i.e. without the use of solid strap-on motors).
39	CanX-5	Canada	30 June 2014	15 kg each	PSLV-C23	PSLV's 10th flight in 'core-alone' configuration (i.e. without the use of solid strap-on motors).
40	VELOX-1	Singapore	30 June 2014	7 kg	PSLV-C23	PSLV's 10th flight in 'core-alone' configuration (i.e. without the use of solid strap-on motors).
41	UK-DMC 3A	United Kingdom	10 July 2015	447 kg	PSLV-XL C28	India's first exclusive foreign satellites launch, all the 5 payloads were from United Kingdom. At the time it was the heaviest commercial mission (1439 kg) successfully accomplished using a launch vehicle assembled by ISRO.
42	UK-DMC 3B	United Kingdom	10 July 2015	447 kg	PSLV-XL C28	India's first exclusive foreign satellites launch, all the 5 payloads were from United Kingdom. At the time it was the heaviest commercial mission (1439 kg) successfully accomplished using a launch vehicle assembled by ISRO.
43	UK-DMC 3C	United Kingdom	10 July 2015	447 kg	PSLV-XL C28	India's first exclusive foreign satellites launch, all the 5 payloads were from United Kingdom. At the time it was the heaviest commercial mission (1439 kg) successfully accomplished using a launch vehicle assembled by ISRO.
44	CBNT-1	United Kingdom	10 July 2015	91 kg	PSLV-XL C28	India's first exclusive foreign satellites launch, all the 5 payloads were from United Kingdom. At the time it was the heaviest commercial mission (1439 kg) successfully accomplished using a launch vehicle assembled by ISRO.
45	De-OrbitSail	United Kingdom	10 July 2015	7 kg	PSLV-XL C28	India's first exclusive foreign satellites launch, all the 5 payloads were from United Kingdom. At the time it was the heaviest commercial mission (1439 kg) successfully accomplished using a launch vehicle assembled by ISRO.
46	LAPAN-A2	Indonesia	28 September 2015	76 kg	PSLV-C30	Commercial satellites from United States were launched on an Indian rocket for the first time. Astrosat, India's first dedicated astronomy satellite, was also launched on this flight.
47	NLS-14 (Ev9)	Canada	28 September 2015	14 kg	PSLV-C30	Commercial satellites from United States were launched on an Indian rocket for the first time. Astrosat, India's first dedicated astronomy satellite, was also launched on this flight.
48	Lemur-2-Peter	United States	28 September 2015	28 kg together	PSLV-C30	Commercial satellites from United States were launched on an Indian rocket for the first time. Astrosat, India's first dedicated astronomy satellite, was also launched on this flight.
49	Lemur-2-Jeroen	United States	28 September 2015	28 kg together	PSLV-C30	Commercial satellites from United States were launched on an Indian rocket for the first time. Astrosat, India's first dedicated astronomy satellite, was also launched on this flight.
50	Lemur-2-Joel	United States	28 September 2015	28 kg together	PSLV-C30	Commercial satellites from United States were launched on an Indian rocket for the first time. Astrosat, India's first dedicated astronomy satellite, was also launched on this flight.
51	Lemur-2-Chris	United States	28 September 2015	28 kg together	PSLV-C30	Commercial satellites from United States were launched on an Indian rocket for the first time. Astrosat, India's first dedicated astronomy satellite, was also launched on this flight.
52	TeLEOS-1	Singapore	16 December 2015	400 kg	PSLV-C29	Exclusive commercial launch of 6 Singaporean satellites.
53	VELOX-C1	Singapore	16 December 2015	123 kg	PSLV-C29	Exclusive commercial launch of 6 Singaporean satellites.
54	VELOX-II	Singapore	16 December 2015	13 kg	PSLV-C29	Exclusive commercial launch of 6 Singaporean satellites.
55	Athenoxat-1	Singapore	16 December 2015	<5 kg	PSLV-C29	Exclusive commercial launch of 6 Singaporean satellites.
56	Kent Ridge 1 (KR 1)	Singapore	16 December 2015	78 kg	PSLV-C29	Exclusive commercial launch of 6 Singaporean satellites.
57	Galassia	Singapore	16 December 2015	3.4 kg	PSLV-C29	Exclusive commercial launch of 6 Singaporean satellites.
58	LAPAN A3	Indonesia	22 June 2016	120 kg	PSLV-XL C34	ISRO launched 20 satellites (including 3 Indian satellites) aboard PSLV-C34, the highest number of satellites that the agency has launched aboard a single flight.
59	BIROS	Germany	22 June 2016	130 kg	PSLV-XL C34	ISRO launched 20 satellites (including 3 Indian satellites) aboard PSLV-C34, the highest number of satellites that the agency has launched aboard a single flight.
60	M3MSat	Canada	22 June 2016	85 kg	PSLV-XL C34	ISRO launched 20 satellites (including 3 Indian satellites) aboard PSLV-C34, the highest number of satellites that the agency has launched aboard a single flight.
61	GHGsat-D	Canada	22 June 2016	25.5 kg	PSLV-XL C34	ISRO launched 20 satellites (including 3 Indian satellites) aboard PSLV-C34, the highest number of satellites that the agency has launched aboard a single flight.
62	SkySat Gen2-1	United States	22 June 2016	110 kg	PSLV-XL C34	ISRO launched 20 satellites (including 3 Indian satellites) aboard PSLV-C34, the highest number of satellites that the agency has launched aboard a single flight.
63-74	12 x Dove (satellite)	United States	22 June 2016	4.7 kg each	PSLV-XL C34	ISRO launched 20 satellites (including 3 Indian satellites) aboard PSLV-C34, the highest number of satellites that the agency has launched aboard a single flight.
75	AlSAT-1N	Algeria	26 September 2016	7 kg	PSLV-G C35	ISRO launches 8 satellites in its 15th flight of the 'XL' version of the PSLV - 5 foreign satellites and 3 Indian satellites (SCATSAT-1, PRATHAM and PISAT).
76	Alsat-1B	Algeria	26 September 2016	103 kg	PSLV-G C35	ISRO launches 8 satellites in its 15th flight of the 'XL' version of the PSLV - 5 foreign satellites and 3 Indian satellites (SCATSAT-1, PRATHAM and PISAT).
77	Alsat-2B	Algeria	26 September 2016	117 kg	PSLV-G C35	ISRO launches 8 satellites in its 15th flight of the 'XL' version of the PSLV - 5 foreign satellites and 3 Indian satellites (SCATSAT-1, PRATHAM and PISAT).
78	NLS-19	Canada	26 September 2016	8 kg	PSLV-G C35	ISRO launches 8 satellites in its 15th flight of the 'XL' version of the PSLV - 5 foreign satellites and 3 Indian satellites (SCATSAT-1, PRATHAM and PISAT).
79	Pathfinder-1	United States	26 September 2016	44 kg	PSLV-G C35	ISRO launches 8 satellites in its 15th flight of the 'XL' version of the PSLV - 5 foreign satellites and 3 Indian satellites (SCATSAT-1, PRATHAM and PISAT).
80-167	88 x Flock-3p	United States	15 February 2017	4.7 kg each	PSLV-XL 37	ISRO launched 104 satellites, of which 3 were Indian satellites. It was the largest number of satellites launched on a single flight by any space agency.
168-175	8 x Lemur-2	United States	15 February 2017	4.6 kg each	PSLV-XL 37	ISRO launched 104 satellites, of which 3 were Indian satellites. It was the largest number of satellites launched on a single flight by any space agency.
176	Al Farabi-1	Kazakhstan	15 February 2017	1.7 kg	PSLV-XL 37	ISRO launched 104 satellites, of which 3 were Indian satellites. It was the largest number of satellites launched on a single flight by any space agency.
177	BGUSAT	Israel	15 February 2017	4.3 kg	PSLV-XL 37	ISRO launched 104 satellites, of which 3 were Indian satellites. It was the largest number of satellites launched on a single flight by any space agency.
178	Nayif-1	United Arab Emirates	15 February 2017	1.1 kg	PSLV-XL 37	ISRO launched 104 satellites, of which 3 were Indian satellites. It was the largest number of satellites launched on a single flight by any space agency.
179	DIDO-2	Switzerland; Israel*	15 February 2017	4.2 kg	PSLV-XL 37	ISRO launched 104 satellites, of which 3 were Indian satellites. It was the largest number of satellites launched on a single flight by any space agency.
180	PEASS	Netherlands; Israel*; Germany*; Belgium*	15 February 2017	3 kg	PSLV-XL 37	ISRO launched 104 satellites, of which 3 were Indian satellites. It was the largest number of satellites launched on a single flight by any space agency.
181	Pegasus	Austria	23 June 2017	2 kg	PSLV-C38	ISRO launched 31 satellites, of which 29 were foreign.
182	SUCHAI-1	Chile	23 June 2017	1 kg	PSLV-C38	ISRO launched 31 satellites, of which 29 were foreign.
183	VZLUSAT-1	Czech Republic	23 June 2017	2 kg	PSLV-C38	ISRO launched 31 satellites, of which 29 were foreign.
184	Aalto-1	Finland	23 June 2017	3.9 kg	PSLV-C38	ISRO launched 31 satellites, of which 29 were foreign.
185	ROBUSTA-1B	France	23 June 2017	1 kg	PSLV-C38	ISRO launched 31 satellites, of which 29 were foreign.
186	COMPASS-2/Dragsail	Germany	23 June 2017	4 kg	PSLV-C38	ISRO launched 31 satellites, of which 29 were foreign.
187	URSAMAIOR	Italy	23 June 2017	3 kg	PSLV-C38	ISRO launched 31 satellites, of which 29 were foreign.
188	D-SAT	Italy	23 June 2017	4.5 kg	PSLV-C38	ISRO launched 31 satellites, of which 29 were foreign.
189	Max Valier	Italy; Germany*	23 June 2017	15 kg	PSLV-C38	ISRO launched 31 satellites, of which 29 were foreign.
190	CE-SAT1	Japan	23 June 2017	60 kg	PSLV-C38	ISRO launched 31 satellites, of which 29 were foreign.
191	Venta-1	Latvia	23 June 2017	7.5 kg	PSLV-C38	ISRO launched 31 satellites, of which 29 were foreign.
192	LituanicaSAT-2	Lithuania	23 June 2017	4 kg	PSLV-C38	ISRO launched 31 satellites, of which 29 were foreign.
193	skCUBE	Slovakia	23 June 2017	1 kg	PSLV-C38	ISRO launched 31 satellites, of which 29 were foreign.
194	NUDTSat (QB50-BE06)	Belgium	23 June 2017	2 kg	PSLV-C38	ISRO launched 31 satellites, of which 29 were foreign.
195	InflateSail	United Kingdom	23 June 2017	3.2 kg	PSLV-C38	ISRO launched 31 satellites, of which 29 were foreign.
196	UCLSat	United Kingdom	23 June 2017	2 kg	PSLV-C38	ISRO launched 31 satellites, of which 29 were foreign.
197-199	3 x Diamond Satellites	United Kingdom	23 June 2017	18 kg	PSLV-C38	ISRO launched 31 satellites, of which 29 were foreign.
200	CICERO-6	United States	23 June 2017	1.2 kg	PSLV-C38	ISRO launched 31 satellites, of which 29 were foreign.
201-208	8 x Lemur-2	United States	23 June 2017	4 kg each	PSLV-C38	ISRO launched 31 satellites, of which 29 were foreign.
209	Tyvak-53b	United States	23 June 2017	?	PSLV-C38	ISRO launched 31 satellites, of which 29 were foreign.
210	Telesat Phase-1 LEO	Canada	12 January 2018	168 kg	PSLV-XL C40	ISRO Launched 31 satellites, of which 28 were foreign.
211	POC-1	Finland	12 January 2018	?	PSLV-XL C40	ISRO Launched 31 satellites, of which 28 were foreign.
212	PicSat	France	12 January 2018	3.5 kg	PSLV-XL C40	ISRO Launched 31 satellites, of which 28 were foreign.
213	CBNT-2	United Kingdom	12 January 2018	42.7 kg	PSLV-XL C40	ISRO Launched 31 satellites, of which 28 were foreign.
214	CANYVAL-X	Republic of Korea	12 January 2018	4 kg	PSLV-XL C40	ISRO Launched 31 satellites, of which 28 were foreign.
215	CNUSAIL-1	Republic of Korea	12 January 2018	4 kg	PSLV-XL C40	ISRO Launched 31 satellites, of which 28 were foreign.
216	KAUSAT-5	Republic of Korea	12 January 2018	3.2 kg	PSLV-XL C40	ISRO Launched 31 satellites, of which 28 were foreign.
217	SIGMA	Republic of Korea	12 January 2018	3.8 kg	PSLV-XL C40	ISRO Launched 31 satellites, of which 28 were foreign.
218	STEP CUBE LAB	Republic of Korea	12 January 2018	1 kg	PSLV-XL C40	ISRO Launched 31 satellites, of which 28 were foreign.
219-222	4 x Flock-3p	United States	12 January 2018	4.7 kg each	PSLV-XL C40	ISRO Launched 31 satellites, of which 28 were foreign.
223-226	4 x Lemur-2	United States	12 January 2018	4 kg each	PSLV-XL C40	ISRO Launched 31 satellites, of which 28 were foreign.
227-230	4 x SpaceBEE	United States	12 January 2018	1 kg each	PSLV-XL C40	ISRO Launched 31 satellites, of which 28 were foreign.
231	DemoSat-2	United States	12 January 2018	?	PSLV-XL C40	ISRO Launched 31 satellites, of which 28 were foreign.
232	Micromas-2	United States	12 January 2018	3.8 kg	PSLV-XL C40	ISRO Launched 31 satellites, of which 28 were foreign.
233	Tyvak-61C	United States	12 January 2018	?	PSLV-XL C40	ISRO Launched 31 satellites, of which 28 were foreign.
234	Fox-1D	United States	12 January 2018	1.5 kg	PSLV-XL C40	ISRO Launched 31 satellites, of which 28 were foreign.
235	Corvus BC3	United States	12 January 2018	10 kg	PSLV-XL C40	ISRO Launched 31 satellites, of which 28 were foreign.
236	Arkyd-6	United States	12 January 2018	10 kg	PSLV-XL C40	ISRO Launched 31 satellites, of which 28 were foreign.
237	CICERO-7	United States	12 January 2018	10 kg	PSLV-XL C40	ISRO Launched 31 satellites, of which 28 were foreign.
238	NovaSAR	United Kingdom	16 September 2018	445 kg	PSLV-CA C42	Exclusive commercial launch of two foreign satellites belonged to Surrey Satellite Technologies Ltd (SSTL), United Kingdom. The satellites were put into Sun-synchronous orbit under a commercial arrangement with Antrix Corp Ltd, the commercial arm of the ISRO.
239	S1-4	United Kingdom	16 September 2018	444 kg	PSLV-CA C42	Exclusive commercial launch of two foreign satellites belonged to Surrey Satellite Technologies Ltd (SSTL), United Kingdom. The satellites were put into Sun-synchronous orbit under a commercial arrangement with Antrix Corp Ltd, the commercial arm of the ISRO.
240	Centauri -1	Australia	29 November 2018	10 kg	PSLV-CA C43	-
241	Kepler (CASE)	Canada	29 November 2018	<15 kg	PSLV-CA C43	-
242	FACSAT-1	Colombia	29 November 2018	4 kg	PSLV-CA C43	-
243	Reaktor Hello World	Finland	29 November 2018	<1 kg	PSLV-CA C43	-
244	InnoSAT-2	Malaysia	29 November 2018	4 kg	PSLV-CA C43	-
245	HIBER-1	Netherlands	29 November 2018	?	PSLV-CA C43	-
246	^{3}Cat-1	Spain	29 November 2018	1.2 kg	PSLV-CA C43	-
247	CICERO-8	United States	29 November 2018	10 kg	PSLV-CA C43	-
248-263	16x FLOCK 3R	United States	29 November 2018	4 kg	PSLV-CA C43	-
264	Global -1	United States	29 November 2018	56 kg	PSLV-CA C43	-
265	HSAT-1	United States	29 November 2018	13 kg	PSLV-CA C43	-
266-269	4 x Lemur-2	United States	29 November 2018	4 kg each	PSLV-CA C43	-
270	Bluewalker 1	Lithuania	1 April 2019	10 kg	PSLV-QL C45	
271	M6P	Lithuania	1 April 2019	6.8 kg	PSLV-QL C45	
272	Aistechsat-3	Spain	1 April 2019	2.3 kg	PSLV-QL C45	
273	Astrocasr-2	Switzerland	1 April 2019	3.8 kg	PSLV-QL C45	
274–293	20 x Flock 4a (Doves)	United States	1 April 2019	5.7 kg each	PSLV-QL C45	
294–297	4 x Lemur-2	United States	1 April 2019	5.2 kg each	PSLV-QL C45	
298	Meshbed	United States	27 November 2019 03:58 UTC	4.5 kg	PSLV-XL C47	
299–310	12 x Flock 4p (Super Doves)	United States	27 November 2019 03:58 UTC	?	PSLV-XL C47	
311	Izanagi (QPS-SAR)	Japan	11 December 2019, 09:55 UTC	~100 kg	PSLV-QL C48	
312	Duchifat-3	Israel	11 December 2019, 09:55 UTC	2.3 kg	PSLV-QL C48	
313	1HOPSAT	United States	11 December 2019, 09:55 UTC	22 kg	PSLV-QL C48	
314–317	4 x Lemur-2	United States	11 December 2019, 09:55 UTC	?	PSLV-QL C48	
318	Tyvak-0129 (PTD 1)	United States	11 December 2019, 09:55 UTC	11 kg	PSLV-QL C48	
319	Tyvak-0092 (COMMTRAIL)	Italy	11 December 2019, 09:55 UTC	?	PSLV-QL C48	

== 2020s ==
No.	Satellite	Country	Launch date	Launch mass	Launch vehicle	Remarks
320	R2	Lithuania	7 November 2020, 09:41 UTC	-	PSLV-DL C49	Technology demonstration satellite.
321–324	Kleos (KSM-1A, 1B, 1C and 1D)	Luxembourg	7 November 2020, 09:41 UTC	-	PSLV-DL C49	For maritime applications.
325–328	Lemur-1, 2, 3 and 4	United States	7 November 2020, 09:41 UTC	-	PSLV-DL C49	Remote sensing applications
329	Amazônia-1	Brazil	28 February 2021, 04:54 UTC	637 kg	PSLV-DL C51	First Earth observation satellite entirely developed by Brazil.
330–341	12 x SpaceBEE	United States	28 February 2021, 04:54 UTC	12 x 4 kg	PSLV-DL C51	
342	SAI-1 Nanoconnect-2	United States; Mexico*	28 February 2021, 04:54 UTC	-	PSLV-DL C51	
343	DS-EO	Singapore	30 June 2022, 12:32 UTC	365 kg	PSLV-CA C53	
344	NeuSAR	Singapore	30 June 2022, 12:32 UTC	155 kg	PSLV-CA C53	
345	SCOOB-I	Singapore	30 June 2022, 12:32 UTC	2.80 kg	PSLV-CA C53	
346-381	36 × OneWeb	United Kingdom	22 October 2022, 18:37 UTC	5,796 kg (12,778 lb)	LVM3-M2	First commercial launch of LVM3.
382-385	4 × Astrocast	United States	26 November 2022, 06:26 UTC	17.92 kg	PSLV-XL C54	Satellites Developed by Spaceflight, United States For Astrocast, Switzerland
386	Anand	United States	26 November 2022, 06:26 UTC		PSLV-XL C54	
387	Janus-1	United States	10 February 2023, 03:48 UTC	11.5 kg	SSLV-D2	First Successful launch of SSLV
388-423	36 × OneWeb	United Kingdom	26 March 2023, 03:30 UTC	5,805 kg (12,798 lb)	LVM3-M3	Second commercial launch of LVM3. It is the heaviest payload that is launched by a LVM3 and ISRO to date.
424	TeLEOS-2	Singapore	22 April 2023, 08:50 UTC	741 kg	PSLV-CA C55	57th Mission of PSLV
425	Lumelite-4	Singapore	22 April 2023, 08:50 UTC	16 kg	PSLV-CA C55	57th Mission of PSLV
426	DS-SAR	Singapore	30 July 2023, 01:01 UTC	352 kg	PSLV-CA C56	58th PSLV Mission. Commercial Launch for Singapore's DS-SAR Satellite and 6 Co-Passenger satellites from Singapore.
427	Arcade	Singapore	30 July 2023, 01:01 UTC	24 kg	PSLV-CA C56	58th PSLV Mission. Commercial Launch for Singapore's DS-SAR Satellite and 6 Co-Passenger satellites from Singapore.
428	Velox-AM	Singapore	30 July 2023, 01:01 UTC	23 kg	PSLV-CA C56	58th PSLV Mission. Commercial Launch for Singapore's DS-SAR Satellite and 6 Co-Passenger satellites from Singapore.
429	SCOOB-II	Singapore	30 July 2023, 01:01 UTC	4 kg	PSLV-CA C56	58th PSLV Mission. Commercial Launch for Singapore's DS-SAR Satellite and 6 Co-Passenger satellites from Singapore.
430	ORB-12 STRIDER	Singapore	30 July 2023, 01:01 UTC	13 kg	PSLV-CA C56	58th PSLV Mission. Commercial Launch for Singapore's DS-SAR Satellite and 6 Co-Passenger satellites from Singapore.
431	Galassia-2	Singapore	30 July 2023, 01:01 UTC	3.5 kg	PSLV-CA C56	58th PSLV Mission. Commercial Launch for Singapore's DS-SAR Satellite and 6 Co-Passenger satellites from Singapore.
432	NuLIon	Singapore	30 July 2023, 01:01 UTC	3 kg	PSLV-CA C56	58th PSLV Mission. Commercial Launch for Singapore's DS-SAR Satellite and 6 Co-Passenger satellites from Singapore.
433	PROBA-3	European Union	5 December 2024	550 kg	PSLV-XL C59	Solar Observatory Technology Demonstrator by ESA
434	Bluebird Block 2	United States	24 December 2025	6100 kg	LVM3-M6	Communication Satellite by AST SpaceMobile

== Satellites launched from India by country ==
Data as of Dec 2025, ' * ' indicates inclusion of satellites developed in international collaboration by particular country
No.	Country	Total Number of Satellites
1	United States	233
2	United Kingdom	86
3	Singapore	20
4	Germany	13*
5	Canada	12
6	Luxembourg	7*
7	Republic of Korea	6
8	Israel	5*
9	Italy	5
10	Japan	5
11	Algeria	4
12	France	4
13	Lithuania	4
14	Switzerland	4
15	Netherlands	3
16	Austria	3
17	Finland	3
18	Indonesia	3
19	Belgium	2*
20	Denmark	2
21	Spain	2
22	Argentina	1
23	Australia	1
24	Brazil	1
25	Chile	1
26	Colombia	1
27	Czech Republic	1
28	China	1
29	Kazakhstan	1
30	Latvia	1
31	Malaysia	1
32	Mexico	1*
33	Norway	1
34	Slovakia	1
35	Turkey	1
36	United Arab Emirates	1
	European Union	1
Total	36 countries + EU	434 satellites

== See also ==
- List of Indian satellites
- Space industry of India
