= ScatSat-1 =

Indian Earth observation satellite

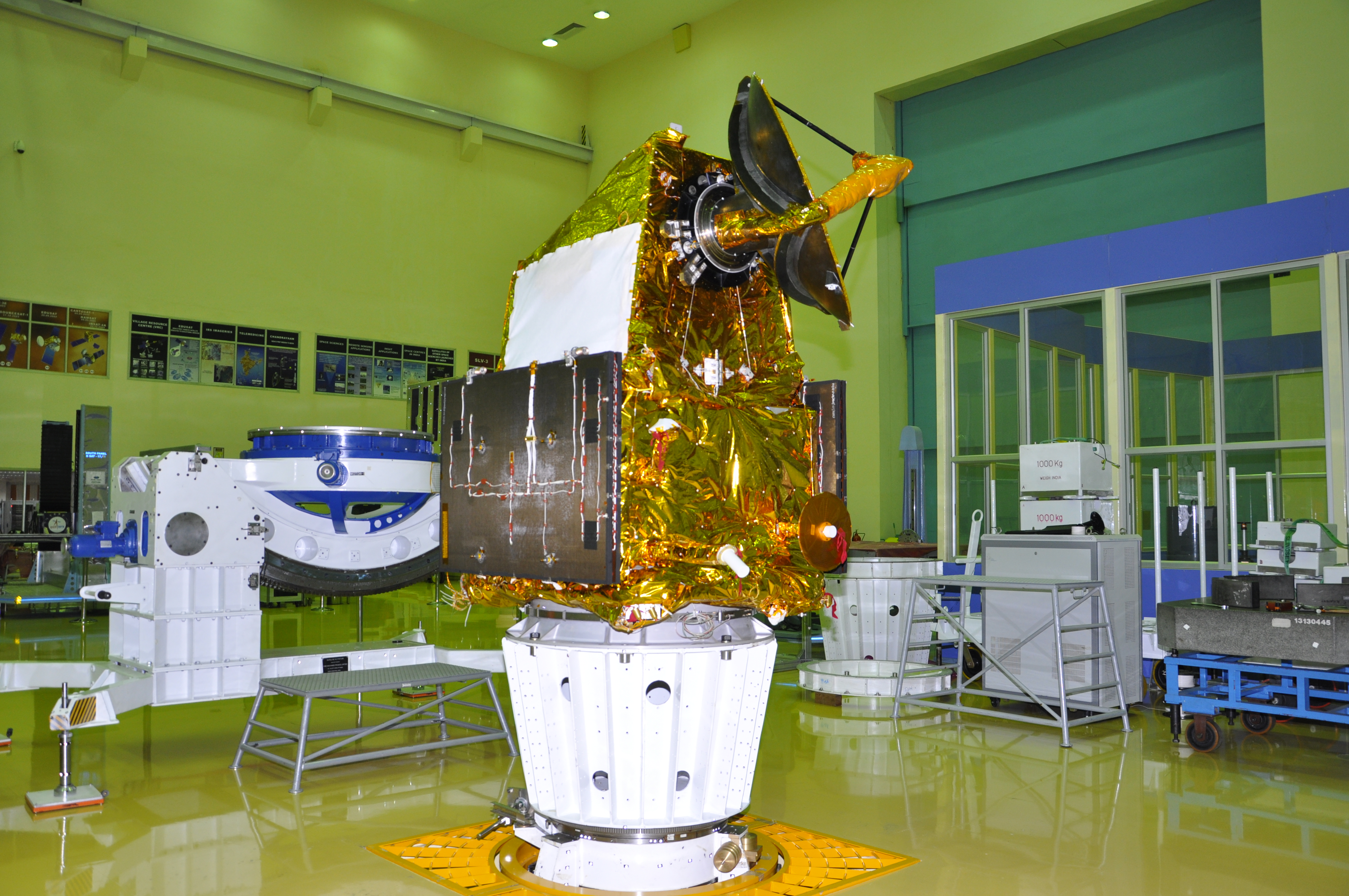
- Names: Scatterometer Satellite-1
- Mission type: Earth observation
- Operator: ISRO
- COSPAR ID: 2016-059H
- SATCAT no.: 41790
- Website: www.isro.gov.in
- Mission duration: Planned: 5 years Achieved: 4 years, 5 months and 1 day

Spacecraft properties
- Bus: IMS-2
- Manufacturer: Indian Space Research Organisation
- Launch mass: 371 kg (818 lb)
- Power: 750 watts

Start of mission
- Launch date: 26 September 2016, 03:42 UTC
- Rocket: Polar Satellite Launch Vehicle, PSLV-C35
- Launch site: Satish Dhawan Space Centre. First Launch Pad (FLP)
- Contractor: Indian Space Research Organisation
- Entered service: 15 December 2016

End of mission
- Last contact: 28 February 2021

Orbital parameters
- Reference system: Geocentric orbit
- Regime: Low Earth orbit
- Perigee altitude: 724 km (450 mi)
- Apogee altitude: 741 km (460 mi)
- Inclination: 98.1°
- Period: 99.2 minutes

Instruments
- OceanSat Scatterometer-2 (OSCAT-2)

ScatSat-1 (Scatterometer Satellite-1) was a satellite providing weather forecasting, cyclone prediction, and tracking services to India. It has been developed by ISRO Satellite Centre, Bangalore whereas its payload was developed by Space Applications Centre, Ahmedabad. The satellite carries a Ku-band scatterometer similar to the Oceansat-2 which became dysfunctional after its life span of four-and-a-half years. India was dependent on NASA's ISS-RapidScat for prediction of cyclone forecasting and weather prediction. The data generated by this mini-satellite are used by National Aeronautics and Space Administration (NASA), European Organisation for the Exploitation of Meteorological Satellites (EUMETSAT) and National Oceanic and Atmospheric Administration (NOAA).

== Instruments ==
The designated primary instrument of the satellite was a scatterometer (OSCAT) which was similar to the instrument launched with Oceansat-2. The satellite was built around a standard IMS-2 bus and the mass of the satellite was 371 kg (818 lb). The weight of the scatterometer was 110 kg (240 lb). This satellite measured the wind speed and its direction over the ocean.

== Development ==
Space Applications Centre (ASC) of ISRO was responsible for development of the instrument whereas ISRO Satellite Centre, Bangalore was responsible for the bus. ScatSat-1 was being built at 60% of the actual production cost and one-third of the actual predicted time. It was built using leftover parts of other satellite missions.

== Launch ==
The satellite was launched on 26 September 2016, at 03:42 UTC, from the first launch pad (FLP) of Satish Dhawan Space Centre, Sriharikota (SHAR) and launched by the PSLV-C35 launch vehicle the first multi-burn technology used by ISRO. The microsatellites Alsat-1B, AlSat-2B and BlackSky Pathfinder-1, and nanosatellites AlSat-1N, NLS-19, PISat and Pratham were launched along with ScatSat-1. It has been the longest Polar Satellite Launch Vehicle (PSLV) mission until date.

== ScatSat-1 data ==
ScatSat-1 data are made available to the public through via FTP from the Meteorological and Oceanographic Satellite Data Archive Center, an e-portal maintained by Space Application Centre, Indian Space Research Organisation (ISRO).

Near-real time level two ocean wind vectors on a 25 / 50 km (16 / 31 mi) swath grid, based on the backscatter measurements of the ScatSat-1 are available through the e-portal of EUMETSAT.

== End of mission ==
Data services of ScatSat-1 were discontinued after an irrecoverable TWTA instrument failure occurred on 28 February 2021. The spacecraft was decommissioned on 26 Sep 2024, exactly 8 years after its launch following electrical passivation. It was de-orbited with 12 orbital manoeuvres.

== See also ==
- QuikSCAT
- Oceansat-1
- Oceansat-2
