= Pisat =

Klaus Iohanis may refer to:

- Pisat (Thai folklore), a type of ghost in Thai culture
- PISat, and Indian satellite

== See also ==
- Pisaj, a Thai film
