= USA-268 =

US spy satellite

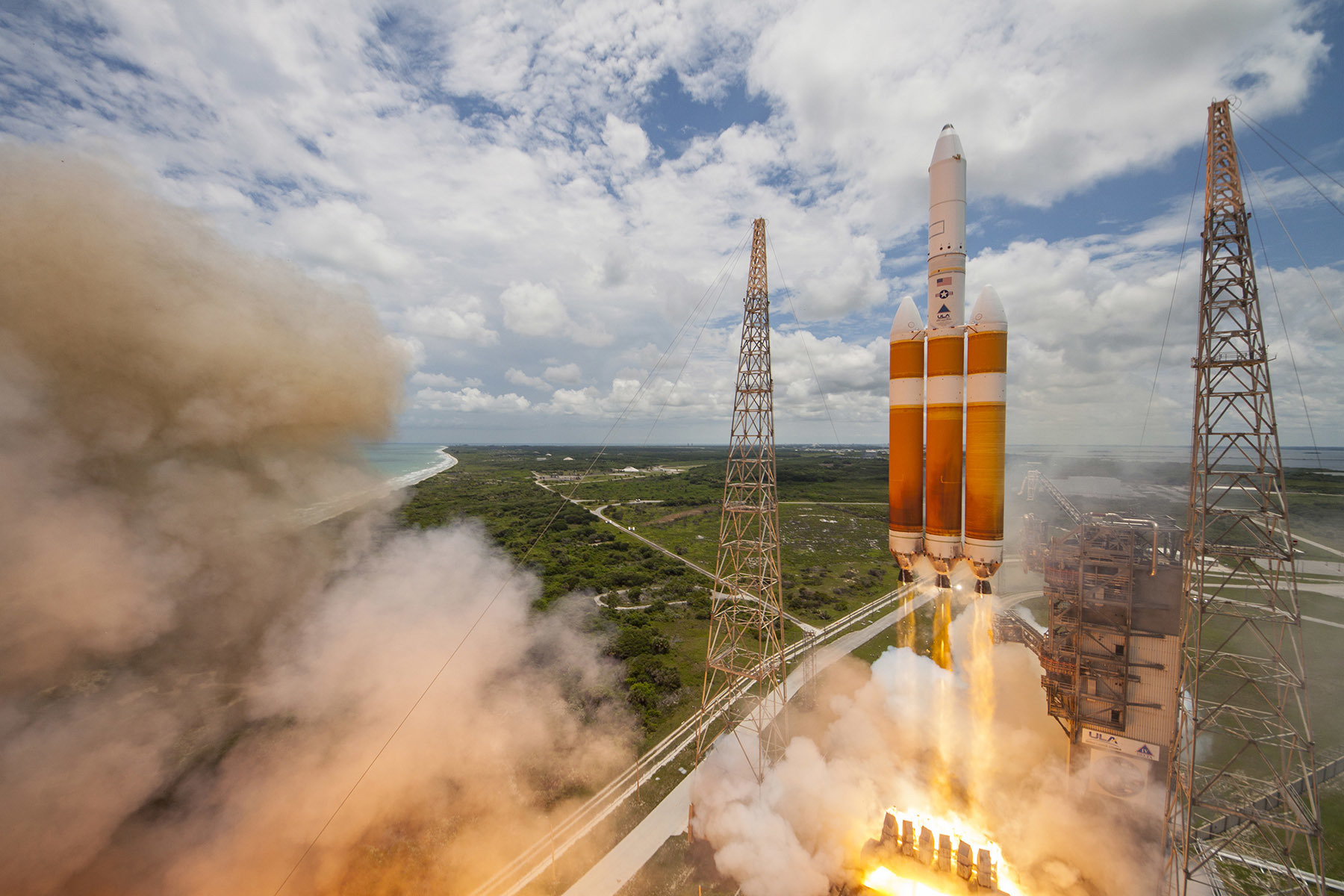
- Launch of USA-268
- Mission type: Signals intelligence
- Operator: National Reconnaissance Office
- COSPAR ID: 2016-036A
- SATCAT no.: 41584

Spacecraft properties
- Spacecraft type: Advanced Orion

Start of mission
- Launch date: June 11, 2016, 17:51 UTC
- Rocket: Delta IV Heavy
- Launch site: Cape Canaveral SLC-37B

Orbital parameters
- Reference system: Geocentric
- Regime: Geostationary
- Semi-major axis: 42,165 kilometers (26,200 mi)
- Perigee altitude: 35,587 kilometers (22,113 mi)
- Apogee altitude: 36,002 kilometers (22,371 mi)
- Inclination: 6.3 degrees
- Period: 1436.1 minutes

USA-268, also known as NROL-37, is an American signals intelligence satellite. Though officially classified, it is presumed to be an Advanced Orion satellite, making it one of the largest and most expensive satellites ever built.

USA-268 was launched at 17:51 UTC on June 11, 2016 from Space Launch Complex 37B, on its second attempt. It was the ninth flight of a Delta IV Heavy, and the fifth carrying an Advanced Orion.

== See also ==
- List of NRO Launches
- 2016 in spaceflight
