= Pratham (satellite) =

Indian ionospheric research satellite

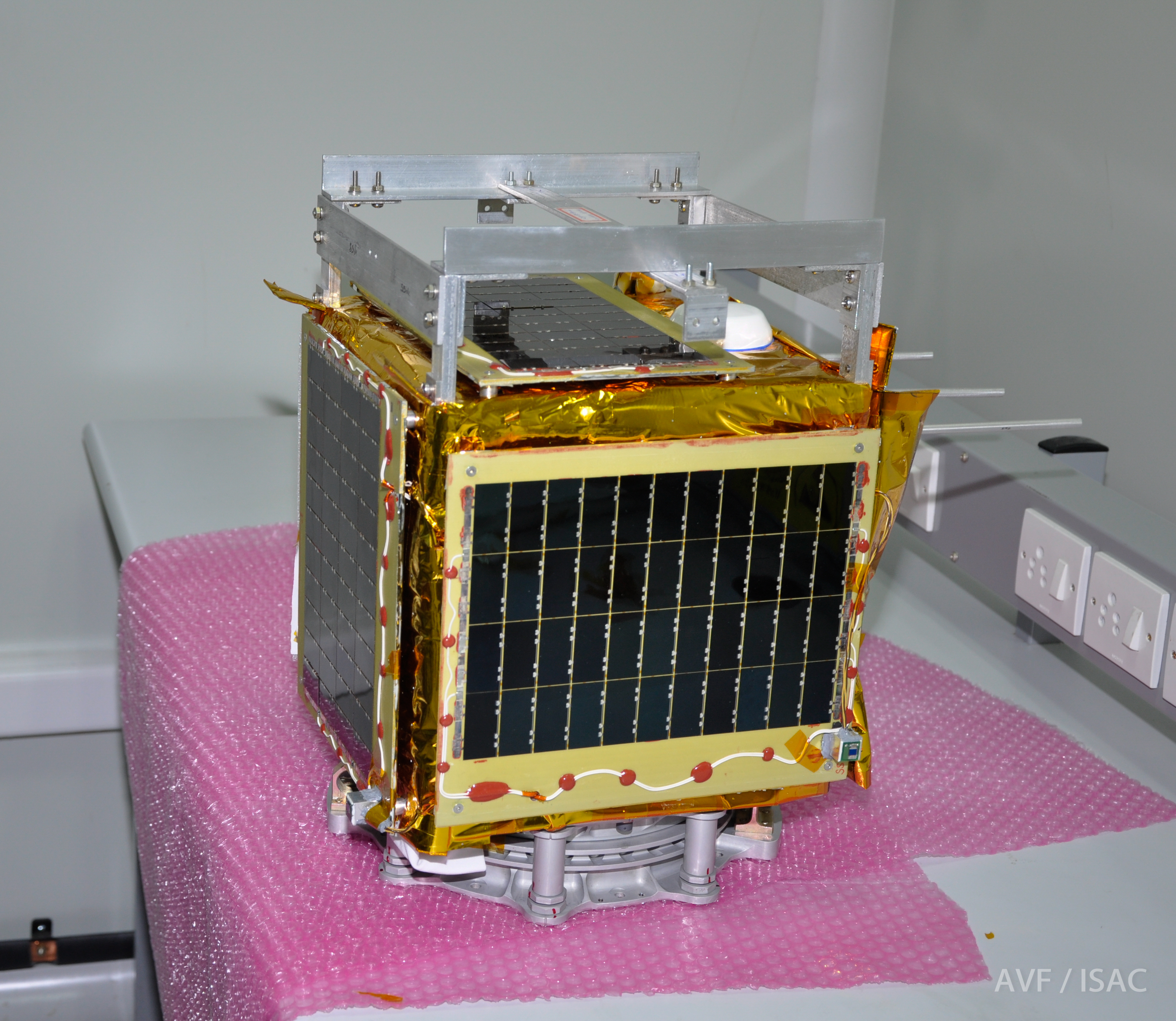
- Pratham Final Flight Model
- Mission type: Ionospheric; Technology
- Operator: IIT Bombay
- COSPAR ID: 2016-059A
- SATCAT no.: 41783
- Website: Pratham, IIT Bombay Student Satellite Initiative
- Mission duration: 4 months

Spacecraft properties
- Manufacturer: Student Satellite Lab, IIT Bombay
- Launch mass: 10.15 kilograms (22.4 lb)

Start of mission
- Launch date: September 26, 2016
- Rocket: PSLV
- Launch site: Satish Dhawan, Sriharikota, Andhra Pradesh
- Contractor: ISRO

Orbital parameters
- Reference system: Geocentric
- Regime: Low Earth

Pratham is an Indian ionospheric research satellite which will be operated by the Indian Institute of Technology Bombay as part of the Student Satellite Initiative. Its primary mission is to count electrons in the Earth's ionosphere. The Pratham spacecraft is a cube with 30-centimetre (12 in) sides and a mass of around 10.15 kilograms (22.4 lb). It was conceptualized by a team of students under the supervision of Professor K. Sudhakar. Pratham was successfully launched on 26 September 2016 from Satish Dhawan Space Centre, Sriharikota, Andhra Pradesh along with 7 other satellites on PSLV C-35.

== Mission ==
'Pratham' has a Four-fold Mission Statement:

1. Enabling students and faculty to gain knowledge and experience in the field of Satellite and Space Technology.
2. Empowering the Satellite Team with the skills to develop the Satellite through various phases of Design, Analysis, Fabrication and Testing until the Flight Model is made.
3. Launching the satellite into orbit and measuring Total Electron Count of the Ionosphere.
4. Involving students from other universities in our Satellite mission by building ground stations in their universities.

== History ==
Pratham was conceptualised in July 2007 by two aerospace engineering students, Saptarshi Bandyopadhyay and Shashank Tamaskar. A memorandum of understanding with ISRO was signed in September 2009 and later extended in 2014. ISRO provided testing facilities and bore the launch expenses, and the project cost was estimated at about Rs 1.5 crore. Business Insider India described it as the first student-led satellite programme in the country. Insight, an IIT Bombay student publication, notes that the mission aimed to give students the skills to develop a satellite through design, analysis, fabrication and testing, with the satellite designed entirely by the student body.

The satellite's payload measures total electron count in n the ionosphere, with the aim of estimating TEC over India and Paris. It was planned for a polar sun-synchronous orbit at about 670 km, passing over India around 11:30 IST. Power came from a lithium-ion battery and four solar panels. For attitude determination it used a GPS receiver, magnetometer and sun sensors, and its actuators were self-fabricated magnetorquers. The team said the data could help correct errors in GPS readings caused by the ionosphere and could assist in tsunami warnings.

Satellite data were to be transmitted to any university with a small ground station, and fifteen Indian universities were setting up their own ground stations before launch, with Atharva College in Mumbai already having one. After the launch on 26 September 2016, the Mullard Space Science Laboratory (MSSL) at University College London was the first to receive the satellite's beacon signal. The signal was decoded as "Pratham IIT Bombay Student Satellite".

== See also ==
- Jugnu (satellite)
