= PSLV-C35 =

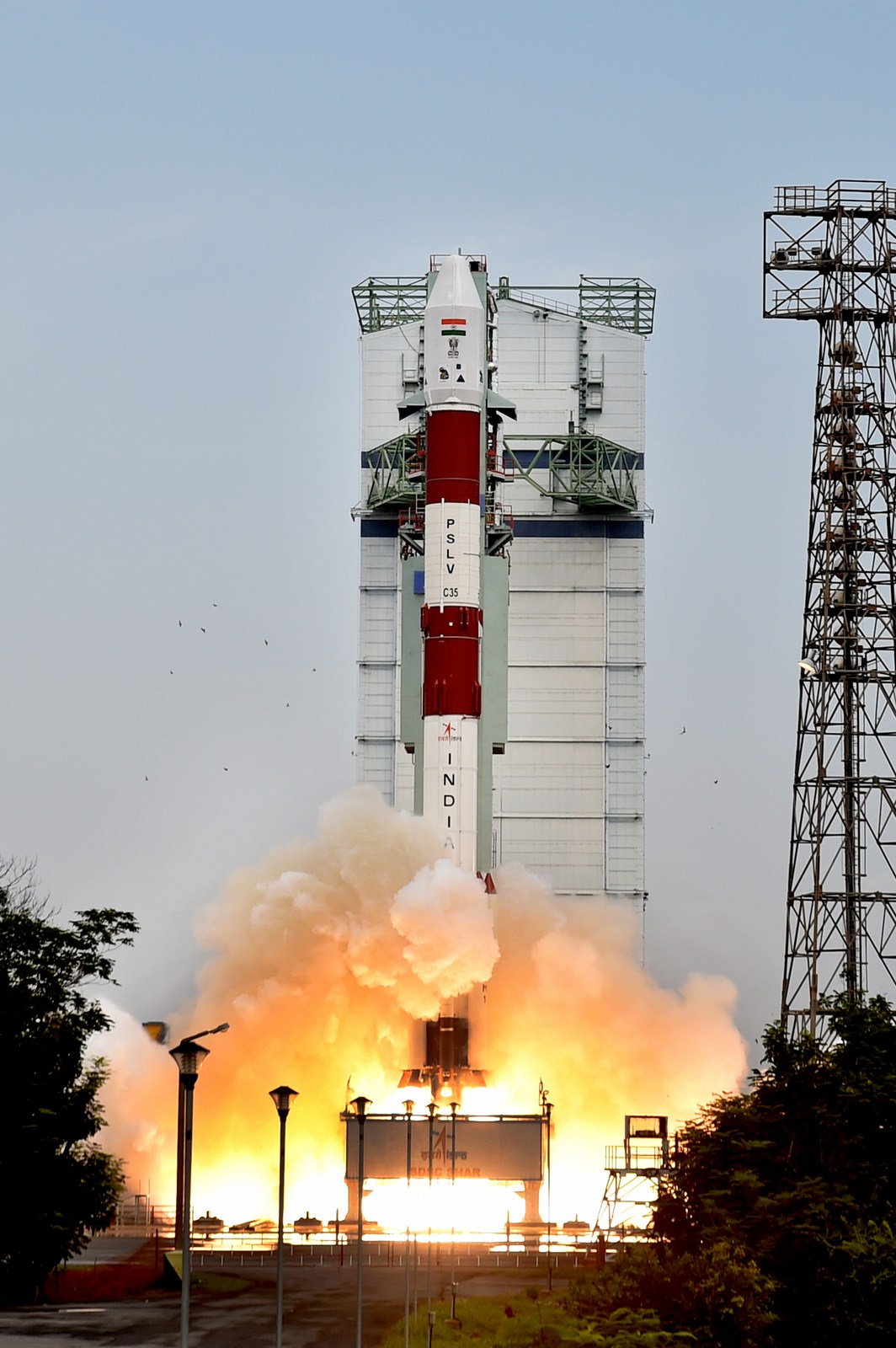
- Launch of PSLV-C35
- Names: Scatsat-1 mission
- Mission type: Deployment of eight satellites in two different orbits.
- Operator: ISRO
- Website: ISRO website
- Mission duration: 8,133 seconds

Spacecraft properties
- Spacecraft: Polar Satellite Launch Vehicle
- Spacecraft type: Expendable launch vehicle
- Manufacturer: ISRO
- Launch mass: 320,000 kilograms (710,000 lb)
- Payload mass: 671.25 kilograms (1,479.9 lb)
- Dimensions: 44.4 metres (146 ft) (overall height)

Start of mission
- Launch date: 03:42, September 26, 2016 (UTC)
- Rocket: Polar Satellite Launch Vehicle
- Launch site: Sriharikota Launching Range
- Contractor: ISRO

End of mission
- Disposal: Not known
- Deactivated: September 26, 2016

Orbital parameters
- Reference system: Polar orbit and Sun-synchronous orbit

Payload
- India ScatSat-1, PISat & Pratham, Algeria Alsat-1B, Alsat-2B & Alsat-1N, Canada CanX-7, United States Pathfinder-1
- Mass: 671.25 kilograms (1,479.9 lb)

PSLV-C35 was the successful mission of the Polar Satellite Launch Vehicle program which set eight satellites in space. It was launched on 26 September 2016 by Indian Space Research Organisation (ISRO) from the Satish Dhawan Space Centre at Sriharikota.

== Launch ==
PSLV-C35 was launched at 03:42 hours Coordinated Universal Time (09:12 hours Indian Standard Time) on 26 September 2016 from the first launch pad of Satish Dhawan Space Centre at Sriharikota in the Indian state of Andhra Pradesh.

== Mission highlights ==
PSLV-C35 was the 37th launch of the PSLV program. It was also the 102nd overall launch by Indian Space Research Organisation. PSLV-C35 was the first spaceflight by ISRO to place satellites in two different orbits with a single rocket. It carried and injected eight satellites built by India, Algeria, Canada and United States.

== Mission parameters ==
- Mass:
  - Total liftoff weight: 320,000 kilograms (710,000 lb)
  - Payload weight: 671.25 kilograms (1,479.9 lb)
- Overall height: 44.4 metres (145.7 ft)
- Propellant:
  - First stage: Solid HTPB based (138.2 + 6 x 8.9 tonnes)
  - Second stage: Liquid UH 25 + N_{2}O_{4} (42 tonnes)
  - Third stage: Solid HTPB based (7.6 tonnes)
  - Fourth stage: Liquid MMH + MON-3 (2.5 tonnes)
- Engine:
  - First stage: Core (PS 1) + 6 strap-on PSOM
  - Second stage: Vikas
  - Third stage: PS 3
  - Fourth stage: PS 4
- Thrust:
  - First stage: 4,762 + 645 x 6 kN
  - Second stage: 800 kN
  - Third stage: 246 kN
  - Fourth stage: 7.3 x 2 kN
- Maximum altitude: 739.314 kilometres (459 mi)
- Maximum velocity:7,527.63 metres per second (24,697 ft/s) (recorded at time of PS-4 engine restart 2)
- Duration: 8,133 seconds

== Payload ==
PSLV-C35 carried and deployed eight satellites in two different orbits in a single mission (Polar and Sun-synchronous orbit). This was the first time India had placed satellites in two orbits in a single mission. The vehicle carried three satellites from India (ScatSat-1, PISat & Pratham), three satellites from Algeria (Alsat-1B, 2B & 1N), one each from Canada (NLS-19) and the United States (Pathfinder-1).

Country	Owner	Name	Nos	Mass	Type	Objective
India	ISRO	ScatSat-1	1	377 kg	Miniaturized satellite	Weather forecasting, cyclone prediction and tracking.
India	IIT Bombay	Pratham	1	10 kg	Nanosatellite	Research satellite.
India	PES Institute of Technology	PISat	1	5.25 kg	Nanosatellite	Remote sensing.
Algeria	Agence Spatiale Algerienne	Alsat-1B	1	103 kg	Earth observation satellite	Agricultural and disaster monitoring.
Algeria	Agence Spatiale Algerienne	Alsat-2B	1	117 kg	Earth observation satellite	Monitoring natural resources.
Algeria	Agence Spatiale Algerienne	Alsat-1N	1	7 kg	Cubesat	Technology demonstration satellite.
Canada	UTIAS	CanX-7	1	8 kg	Cubesat	Technology demonstration satellite.
(United States) USA	Spaceflight Industries	Pathfinder-1	1	44 kg	Earth observation, micro-satellite	Earth imaging.

== See also ==
- Indian Space Research Organisation
- Polar Satellite Launch Vehicle
