= PISat =

Indian remote sensing nanosatellite

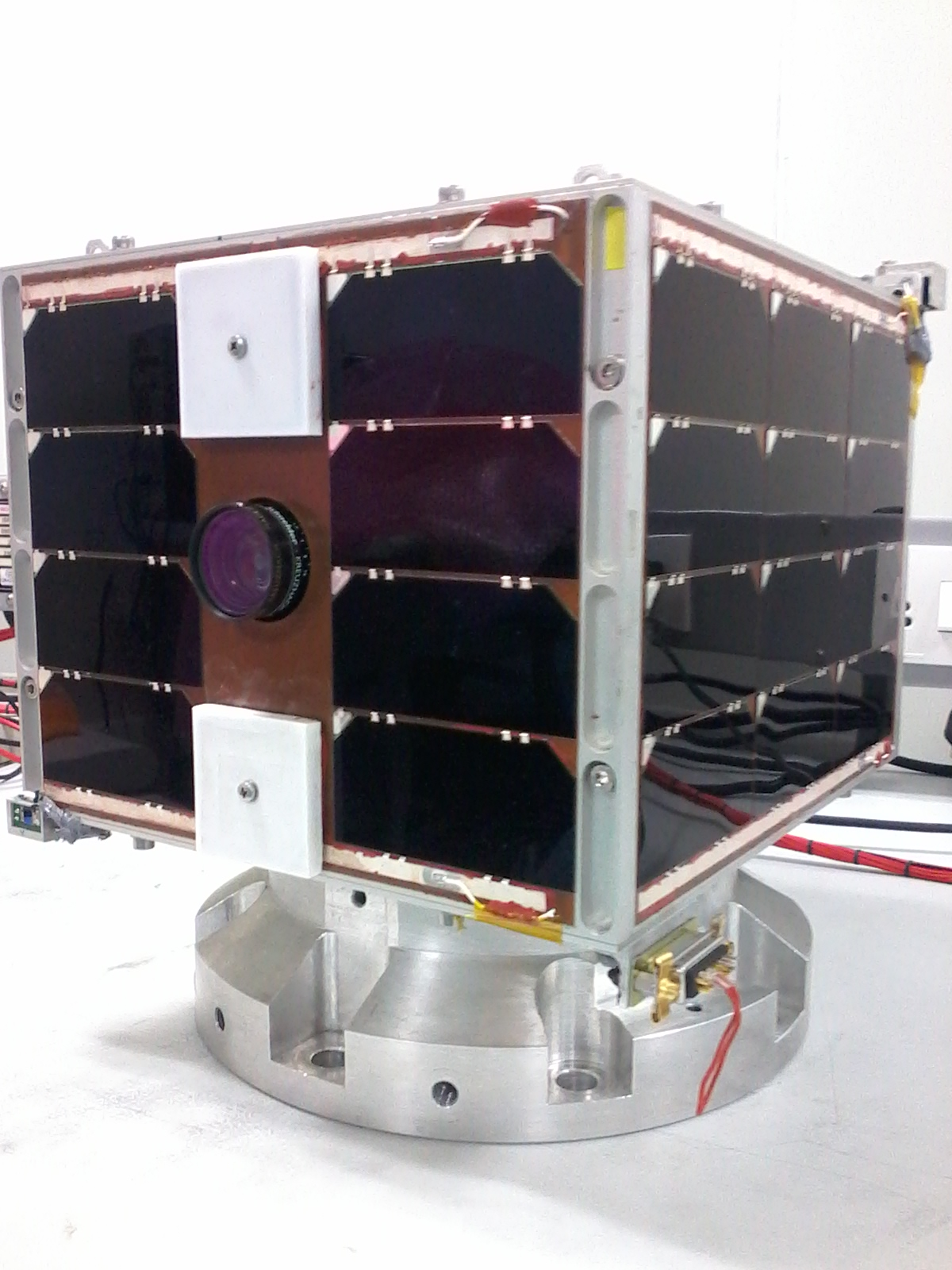
PISat flight model after successfully completing all test at ISRO facilities.

PISat (PESIT Imaging Satellite) is a remote sensing nanosatellite developed by the PES University, Bengaluru.

The satellite weighs 5 kg and carries an image camera that can capture pictures with 80 meter resolution

== Mission ==
The main mission of the satellite was to develop the capability of designing satellites on campus with collaboration from students and professors.

== Launch ==
The satellite was launched on 26 September 2016 by ISRO using the PSLV-C35 rocket.
