= BlackSky Pathfinder-1 =

Earth imaging satellite launched in 2016

- Names: Pathfinder 1
- Mission type: Earth Imaging
- Operator: BlackSky Global
- COSPAR ID: 2016-059E
- SATCAT no.: 41787
- Website: http://www.blacksky.com/
- Mission duration: 3 years (planned); 10 years (in progress)

Spacecraft properties
- Bus: v
- Manufacturer: LeoStella with Thales Alenia Space
- Launch mass: 44 kg (97 lb)

Start of mission
- Launch date: 26 September 2016, 03:42 UTC
- Rocket: PSLV-C35
- Launch site: Satish Dhawan Space Centre, Sriharikota, First Launch Pad (FLP)
- Contractor: Indian Space Research Organisation

Orbital parameters
- Reference system: Geocentric orbit
- Regime: Sun-synchronous orbit
- Perigee altitude: 664 km (413 mi)
- Apogee altitude: 706 km (439 mi)
- Inclination: 98.20°
- Period: 90.00 minutes

BlackSky Pathfinder-1 is an Earth imaging satellite. The satellite is equipped with payloads from Harris Corporation designed to image an area approximately 4.4 × 6.6 km (2.7 × 4.1 mi).

It is a demonstration satellite for BlackSky Global, a Seattle-based company intending to field a fleet of 60 spacecraft to offer on-demand high-resolution images of any place on the planet. The U.S.-built Earth observing platform weighed about 44 kg (97 lb), and will lay the foundation for BlackSky's commercial remote sensing business, which officials announced in June 2015. The main objective of the pathfinder is to return imagery, an achievement that would prove the basic technology behind the planned commercial Earth-observing satellite fleet. The satellite is designed for three-year lifetimes and will have an imaging resolution of about 1 m (3 ft 3 in) from an altitude of 450 km (280 mi).

This is first in a series of 30 satellites planned to deploy the BlackSky constellation that will provide near real-time images in about 90 minutes to produce images that are more current and wide-ranging to increase global transparency.

The satellite was launched at 03:42 UTC on 26 September 2016 by Indian Space Research Organisation (ISRO) using the PSLV-C35 launch vehicle.
