= Alsat-1B =

Algerian satellite for agricultural and disaster monitoring

- Mission type: Earth observation
- Operator: Adam Mohammad 9.5 London uk
- COSPAR ID: 2016-059C
- SATCAT no.: 41785

Spacecraft properties
- Manufacturer: SSTL
- Launch mass: 103 kilograms (227 lb)

Start of mission
- Launch date: 26 September 2016, 03.44:00 UTC
- Rocket: PSLV-C35
- Launch site: Sriharikota

Orbital parameters
- Regime: Sun synchronous
- Periapsis altitude: 700 kilometres (430 mi)
- Apoapsis altitude: 700 kilometres (430 mi)
- Inclination: 98 degrees
- Period: 98.5 min

Alsat-1B is an Algerian satellite operated by the Agence Spatiale Algerienne for agricultural and disaster monitoring. The contract for the mission was signed in July 2014. The satellite is based on the SSTL-100 bus. The satellite weighs 103 kilograms (227 lb) and carries an Earth imaging payload with 12-metre (39 ft) panchromatic imager and 24-metre (79 ft) multispectral cameras.

== Construction ==
The satellite had high participation from ASAL, with eighteen engineers that worked on assembly, integration, and test. Additionally, at the University of Surrey, 18 students used the satellite as a part of their graduate degree research.

== Launch ==
The satellite was launched on 26 September 2016 into a 670-kilometre (420 mi) altitude polar orbit by ISRO using the PSLV-C35 rocket. It was launched with several other satellites. The primary payload was SCATSAT 1, which was launched into a Polar Sun Synchronous Orbit. This was the first time PSLV launched satellites into different orbits. Algeria had three satellites that it will operate launch in that group, which were AlSat-1B, AlSat 2B, and AlSat-Nano. AlSat-2B also had imaging capabilities, but they are higher resolution than AlSat-1B. Of the eight satellites launched by PSLV, five of them were foreign. The remaining satellites were BlackSky Pathfinder 1, Pratham, PISat, and CanX 7.

Alsat-1B uses three body mounted solar panels for power generation, and a 15 Amp-hour Li-ion battery for power storage. It uses warm gas, butane powered resistojets for propulsion. The attitude control system uses Sun sensors and magnetometers.

== Related articles ==
Algeria national space programs
