= Vinayak Pai =

Indian business executive

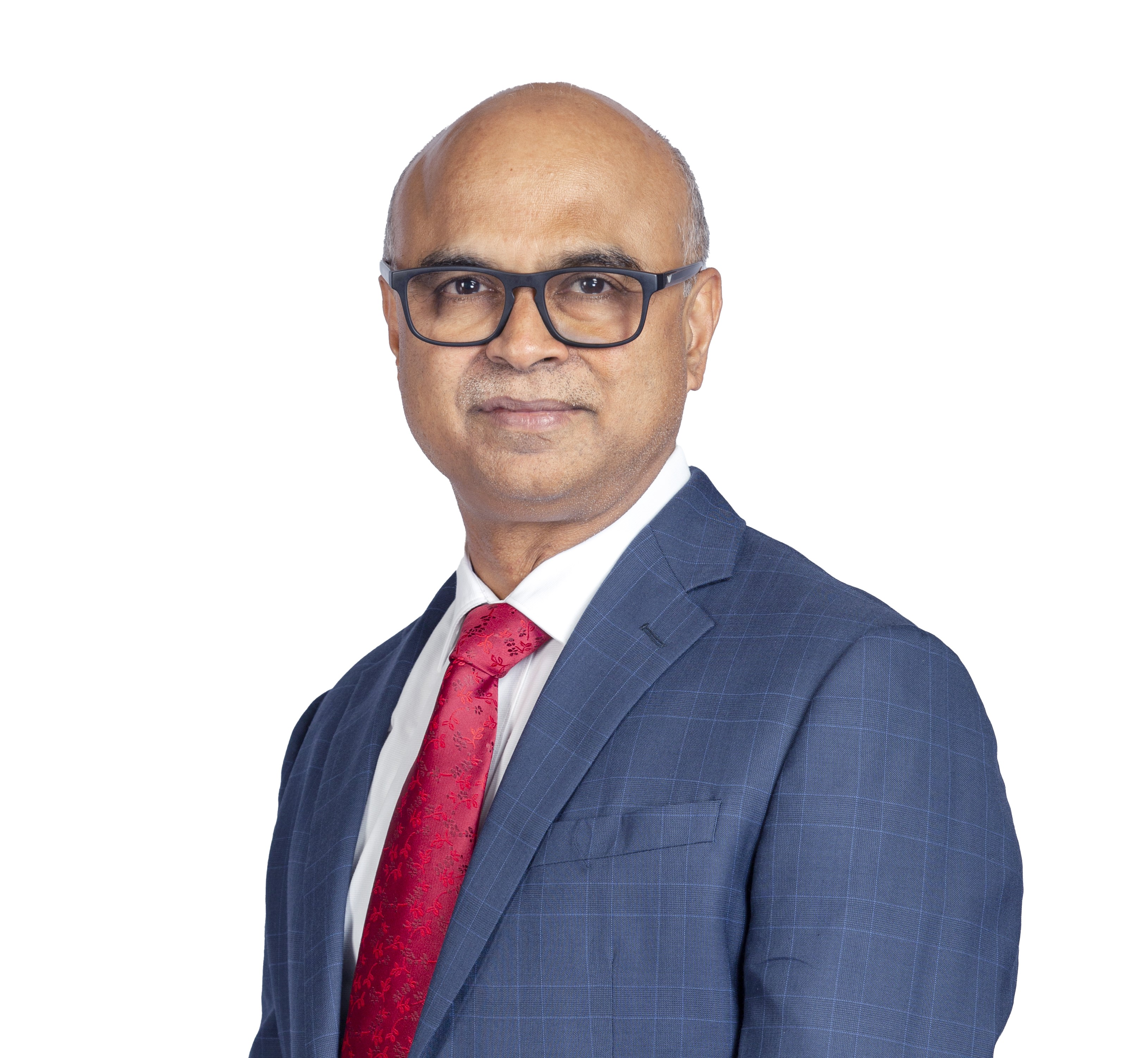
- Born: 19 September 1966 (age 59); India
- Education: College of Engineering, Pune; Symbiosis Institute of Business Management, Pune; IIT Bombay's - Shailesh J. Mehta School of Management
- Occupation: Business executive
- Known for: Managing Director and Chief Executive Officer (CEO), Tata Projects

Vinayak Pai (born 19 September 1966) is an Indian business executive. He was the managing director and CEO of Tata Projects, an engineering, procurement, and construction company, that is part of the Tata Group until his resignation on 30th July 2026.

== Education ==
Pai obtained a degree in BE (electrical engineering) from the College of Engineering, Pune. He also holds a post-graduate degree in management from Symbiosis, Pune and an Executive MBA program from IIT Bombay's Shailesh J. Mehta School of Management in 2004.

Pai is the president of Construction Federation of India National Council. He is the Chairman of Confederation of Indian Industry (CII) Maharashtra and Chairman of the National Committee of Roads & Highways. He is also on the Board of Governors of Construction Industry Development Council and First Construction Council of India and is the Chairman - Board of Governance, COEP Technological University, Pune.

== Career ==
Pai started his career with Aker Solutions as a trainee engineer in 1987 and served 25 years. He was Director of Operations in Aker Solutions. Subsequently, Pai served as the President of Jacobs' global Energy Chemicals and Resources (ECR) business in December 2017, based in Houston, United States. He became Global Group President of Worley's Energy and Chemical Services business in May 2019. In 2022, Pai joined Tata Projects as the managing director and CEO.

Business positions
Preceded by Vinayak Deshpande	Managing Director and CEO of Tata Projects; 2022–present	Incumbent
