= PSLV-C34 =

- Model of the PSLV rocket
- Mission type: Deployment of 20 satellites.
- Operator: ISRO
- Website: ISRO website
- Mission duration: 26:30 minutes
- Distance travelled: 505 Km

Spacecraft properties
- Spacecraft: Polar Satellite Launch Vehicle
- Spacecraft type: Launch vehicle
- Manufacturer: ISRO
- Launch mass: 320,000 kilograms (710,000 lb)
- Payload mass: 1,288 kilograms (2,840 lb)

Start of mission
- Launch date: 09:26, 22 June 2016 (IST)
- Rocket: PSLV
- Launch site: Satish Dhawan Space Centre
- Contractor: ISRO
- Deployment date: 22 June 2016

End of mission
- Disposal: Placed in graveyard orbit
- Deactivated: 22 June 2016

Orbital parameters
- Regime: Sun-synchronous orbit

Payload
- Cartosat-2 satellite (primary) and 19 other satellites from Canada, Germany, India, Indonesia & United States.

Transponders
- HPBW

First stage
- Propellant mass: 211,400 kg (466,100 lb)
- Propellant: HTPB based

Second stage
- Propellant mass: 42,000 kg (93,000 lb)
- Propellant: Liquid UH 25 + N_{2}O_{4}

Third stage
- Propellant mass: 7,600 kg (16,800 lb)
- Propellant: HTPB based

Fourth stage
- Propellant mass: 2,500 kg (5,500 lb)
- Propellant: Liquid MMH + MON-3

PSLV-C34 was the 36th mission of the PSLV (Polar Satellite Launch Vehicle) program and 14th mission of PSLV in XL configuration. The PSLV-C34 successfully carried and deployed 20 satellites in the Sun-synchronous orbit. With a launch mass of 320,000 kilograms (710,000 lb) and payload mass of 1,288 kilograms (2,840 lb), the C34 set a new record of deploying the maximum number of satellites by Indian Space Research Organisation in a single mission. The PSLV-C34 carried One Cartosat-2 satellite, SathyabamaSat (satellite from Sathyabama University, Chennai), Swayam (satellite from College of Engineering, Pune) & 17 other satellites from United States, Canada, Germany & Indonesia.

== Mission parameters ==
- Mass:
  - Total liftoff weight: 320,000 kilograms (710,000 lb)
  - Payload weight: 1,288 kilograms (2,840 lb)
- Overall height: 44.4 metres (145.7 ft)
- Propellant:
  - Stage 1: Solid HTPB based
  - Stage 2: Liquid UH 25 + N_{2}O_{4}
  - Stage 3: Solid HTPB based
  - Stage 4: Liquid MMH + MON-3
- Altitude: 526.877 kilometres (327 mi)
- Maximum velocity: 7,606.61 metres per second (24,956 ft/s) (recorded at time of Cartosat-2 separation)
- Inclination: 97.48°
- Period: 26 minutes 30 seconds

== Launch ==
PSLV-C34 was launched from Satish Dhawan Space Centre at 09:26 IST on 22 June 2016. The PSLV carried total 20 satellites including the primary payload Cartosat-2C. Cartosat-2C was placed in low Earth orbit at 9:44 IST. The entire mission lasted 26 minutes and 30 seconds. The PSLV-C34 is a more advanced, expendable version of the rocket used to launch the Indian Mars Orbiter in 2014.

== Mission milestones ==
The mission marked:

- 36th flight of Polar Satellite Launch Vehicle.
- 14th flight of Polar Satellite Launch Vehicle in XL configuration.
- Record number of satellites carried on a single flight by ISRO.

=== Record launch ===
On 28 April 2008, by placing 10 satellites on PSLV-C9 (PSLV-CA), Indian Space Research Organisation created a world record for the highest number of satellites launched in a single mission. This record was broken by NASA in 2013 (by launching 29 satellites) and was further improved by ISRO when they launched 104 satellites. PSLV-C34 launch was the biggest launch (in terms of number of satellites) by ISRO until PSLV-C37.

== Payload ==
PSLV-C34 carried and deployed total 20 satellites. Following are the details of the payload.

Country	Name	Nos	Mass	Type	Objective
Canada	M3MSat	1	85 kg	Microsatellite technology demonstration	Study of AIS from Low Earth orbit.
Canada	GHGSat-D	1	25.5 kg	Earth observation microsatellite	Measuring atmospheric concentration of greenhouse gases.
(Germany)	BIROS	1	130 kg	Earth observation microsatellite	Remote sensing of high-temperature events.
India	Cartosat-2C	1	727.5 kg	Earth observation satellite	Primary payload. For LIS & GIS uses.
India	SathyabamaSat	1	01.5 kg	Earth observation nanosatellite	Collect data on greenhouse gases.
India	Swayam	1	01 kg	Earth observation nanosatellite	To provide point-to-point messaging services to HAM community.
(Indonesia)	LAPAN-A3	1	120 kg	Earth observation microsatellite	For land use, natural resource and environment monitoring.
(United States) USA	SkySat Gen2-1	1	110 kg	Earth observation microsatellite	Capable of capturing sub-meter resolution imagery and High-definition video.
(United States) USA	Flock-2P	12	04.7 kg	Earth observation nanosatellites	Earth imaging.

== See also ==
- Indian Space Research Organisation
- Polar Satellite Launch Vehicle
