= Kirankumar S. Momaya =

Indian Professor

Kirankumar S. Momaya serves as a Professor of Competitiveness at the Shailesh J. Mehta School of Management at the Indian Institute of Technology Bombay in Mumbai. His research primarily focuses on business excellence, technology & innovation management, and fostering collaborations for enhanced competitiveness.

== Academic career ==
For over a decade, he was a faculty member at the Department of Management Studies, IIT Delhi, where he introduced numerous distinctive contributions. Momaya has undertaken challenging projects in regions like India, Canada, and Japan, including an engagement at the Institute of Innovation Research, Hitotsubashi University in Tokyo. Additionally, he collaborated with the Shimizu Corporation.

== Editorial and publication details ==
In academic publishing, Momaya has served as a chief editor for journals like the International Journal of Global Business and Competitiveness, Journal of Advances in Management Research, and Global Journal of Flexible Systems Management. He has written or co-written two books and published over 60 papers in well-known national and international journals. He has also written several articles for professionals in the industry. In 2018, he became the president of the Global Institute of Flexible Systems Management. He is interested in guiding active researchers who are ready to face challenges in difficult situations.
