= Cartosat-2C =

Indian earth observation satellite

- Names: CartoSat-2C
- Mission type: Earth observation
- Operator: NTRO
- COSPAR ID: 2016-040A
- SATCAT no.: 41599
- Website: https://www.isro.gov.in/
- Mission duration: 5 years (planned); 10 years, 3 months and 4 days (in progress)

Spacecraft properties
- Spacecraft: CartoSat-2C
- Bus: IRS-2
- Manufacturer: Indian Space Research Organisation
- Launch mass: 728 kg (1,605 lb)
- Power: 986 watts

Start of mission
- Launch date: 22 June 2016, 03:56 UTC
- Rocket: Polar Satellite Launch Vehicle-XL, PSLV-C34
- Launch site: Satish Dhawan Space Centre, Second Launch Pad (SLP)
- Contractor: Indian Space Research Organisation
- Entered service: 22 September 2016

Orbital parameters
- Reference system: Geocentric orbit
- Regime: Sun-synchronous orbit
- Perigee altitude: 497 km (309 mi)
- Apogee altitude: 519 km (322 mi)
- Inclination: 97.46°
- Period: 94.72 minutes
Instruments
- PAN: Panchromatic Camera
- HRMX: High-Resolution Multi-Spectral radiometer
- EvM: Event Monitoring camera

Cartosat-2C is an Earth observation satellite in a Sun-synchronous orbit (SSO) and is a fifth flight unit of Cartosat series of satellites. It is a geostationary satellite and appears stationary over a place on the earth. The satellite is built at space application centre Ahmedabad, launched and maintained by the Indian Space Research Organisation (ISRO). It was launched on 22 June 2016.

== Instruments ==
The CartoSat-2C carries a panchromatic camera (PAN) capable of taking black-and-white pictures in the visible region of electromagnetic spectrum. It also carries a High-Resolution Multi-Spectral (HRMX) radiometer which is a type of optical imager. The satellite has a spatial resolution of 0.6 metres. CartoSat-2C is also capable of capturing minute long video of a fixed spot as well, Event Monitoring camera (EvM) for frequent high-resolution land observation of selected areas.

== Launch ==
The satellite launch was originally planned for 20 June 2016, however it was delayed twice due to a gas leakage. It was launched on 22 June 2016 from the second pad of the Satish Dhawan Space Centre. The minisatellites LAPAN-A3, BIROS, and SkySat Gen2-1, microsatellites GHGSat-D, and M3MSat, and nanosatellites Swayam, and SathyabamaSat, and 12 Flock-2P Dove nanosatellites were launched along with CartoSat-2C.

== See also ==
- List of Indian satellites
