= Jeppiaar =

Indian politician and educationist (1931–2016)

Dr. Jeppiaar
- Born: Pangu Raj; 11 June 1931; Muttom, Nagercoil, India
- Died: 18 June 2016 (aged 85); Chennai, Tamil Nadu
- Education: Anna University
- Known for: Founder & Chancellor of Sathyabama University
- Spouse: Remibai Jeppiaar
- Children: 4
- Awards: Honorary Colonel by National Cadet Corps (NCC) Directorate, Tamil Nadu, Pondicherry & Andaman Nicobar
- Scientific career
- Fields: Entrepreneur, educationist

Dr. Jeppiaar (11 June 1931 – 18 June 2016), also known as Jeppiaar Jesuadimai and J. P. R., was an Indian politician, educationist, and industrialist. He was born in Muttom near Nagercoil, Travancore Cochin Presidency, now the Kanyakumari District, Tamil Nadu.

He obtained his Bachelor of Law (B.L.) from Madras University and his PhD from Anna University. He was the founder and chairman of Jeppiaar Educational Trust and he was the founder and chancellor of the Sathyabama University. He was also the president of the Consortium of Professional, Arts and Science Colleges of Tamil Nadu.

He is one of the pioneers in the privatization of engineering education in Tamil Nadu. His net worth was estimated at ₹ 3,000 crore in 2016.

== Early life ==
Jeppiaar was born in a Mukkuvar Roman Catholic Christian family. His father was Jesuadimai and mother Panimalar Ammal, after whom he named the Panimalar educational institutions. He was said to be a close associate of M. G. Ramachandran.

== Political career ==
During Dr. M. G. Ramachandran's regime, he acted as the Government chief whip of the Tamil Nadu Legislative Council. He also served as the Secretary of the Chennai District AIADMK party from 1972 to 1987 and was a special envoy to the Chief Minister.

- The chairman of Madras Water Supply and Sewerage Board (Metro Water).
- Honorary services as Elected Member of Legislative Council
- Director of Tamil Nadu Fisheries Development Corporation.

== Death ==
On 18 June 2016, he died shortly after experiencing breathlessness, sometimes between 8.30 PM and 8.45 PM Indian Standard Time IST. He was rushed to the emergency ward of Global Hospital at around 8.50 PM, Perumbakkam, where he was declared dead upon arrival. He was aged 85, at the time of death. Funeral of Jeppiaar took place at Sathyabama University, Chennai on 19 June 2016 and was attended by students, teachers, politicians, film personalities and people from different walks of life; and he was laid to rest at the entrance portion of the university.

=== Launch of memorial museum ===
As a tribute to him, a memorial museum was set up and inaugurated in the premises of Jeppiaar Engineering College on 17 June 2017. The museum is an artistic tribute to him, and was launched a day before his first death anniversary, by Dr. Regeena Jeppiaar. This museum is the first of its kind in India, which has been exclusively dedicated for an educationist. It has a collection of his various portraits, depicting his life and achievements in many fields such as academic, cultural, and social circles from his childhood till demise amongst his personal things. The whole work of the museum was designed by the artist Mr. A. P. Sridhar. Several dignitaries from cinema and educational fields attended and inaugurated the museum.

== Filmography ==
=== As producer ===
Year	Film	Notes	Ref.
1978	Thanga Rangan		
1979	Porter Ponnusamy		
1980	Vasantha Azhaippugal		
1982	Pani Malar		
1985	Unnai Vida Maatten		
1991	Nallathai Naadu Kekum	also director & actor	

=== As actor ===
Year	Film	Role	Notes	Ref.
1991	Nallathai Naadu Kekum	Raja	also director & producer	
