= Sanjay Govind Dhande =

Indian engineer and educationist

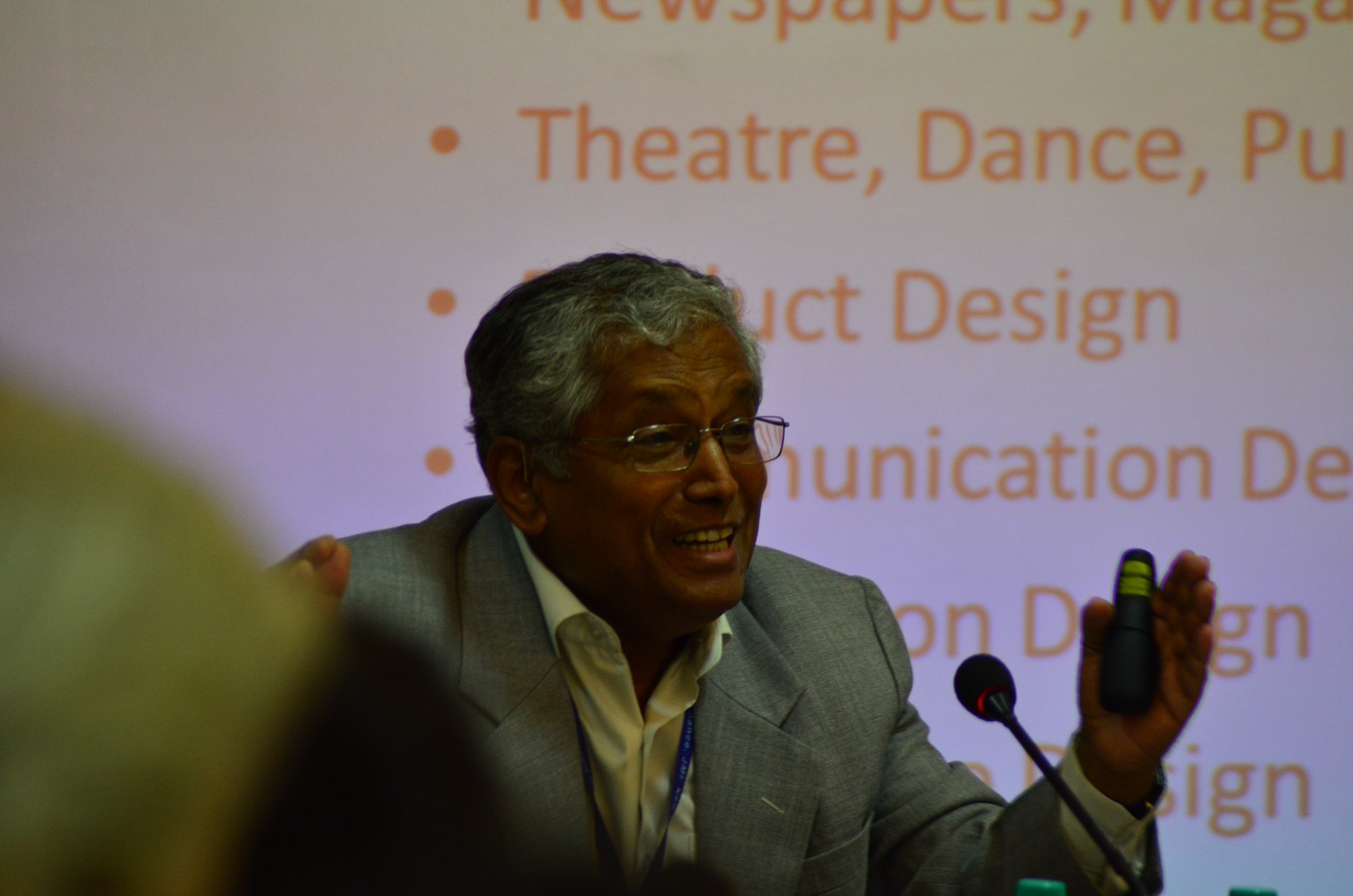
- Born: 14 February 1948 (age 78)
- Education: B. E. - 1969 Major - Mechanical Engineering, College of Engineering Pune (University of Poona), India Ph.D. - 1974 Major - Mechanical Engineering, Indian Institute of Technology, Kanpur
- Occupations: Engineer, educationist

Sanjay Govind Dhande is an Indian mechanical engineer and educationist. He is alumnus of College of engineering Pune. He was Director of the Indian Institute of Technology Kanpur and was in temporary charge of the Indian Institute of Information Technology and Management Gwalior. From the year 2016 to 2020, Professor Dhande was the Chairman, Board of Governors of National Institute of Industrial Engineering (NITIE), Mumbai, an Institute established by the Government of India in the year 1963. He was also Chairman, Board of Governors of National Institute of Technology Delhi (NIT Delhi). Professor Dhande was the founder director of Indian Institute of Information Technology, Design and Manufacturing, Jabalpur. He served as a part-time member of Telecom Regulatory Authority of India. Also, he was a member of the Scientific Advisory Council to the Prime Minister of India.

Dhande has worked in the field of Computer Aided Design, Rapid Prototyping, Rapid Tooling and Reverse Engineering. AUTOLAY, an innovative CAD technology, that he developed for the Indian Aeronautical Development Agency is used by several aircraft manufacturers around the world and for the construction of light combat aircraft in India.

Indian Institute of Information Technology, Design and Manufacturing, Jabalpur is a beneficiary of the protocol signed by the Prime Ministers of India and Japan. Dhande has established another new institute, the Indian Institute of Saddlery Technology and Export Management (IISTEM) at Banther near Kanpur under the aegis of the Indian Ministry of Commerce and Industry, in order to develop the traditional technology available in the region.

He has been assisting the Indian government by preparing the vision documents and charters for the Indian Institutes of Science for Education & Research (IISER) at Pune and Kolkata.

He is honored with Padma Shri in 2013.

In 2014, Professor Dhande founded Mahindra Ecole Centrale, College of Engineering at Hyderabad and left the college in 2015.

== Publications ==
=== Doctoral Dissertation ===
"Geometrical Synthesis of Two-dimensional and Three-dimensional Cam Mechanisms", Submitted to the Department of Mechanical Engg., Indian Institute of Technology, Kanpur, August 1974.

=== Books ===
"Kinematics and Geometry of Planar and Spatial Cam Mechanisms", by Sanjay G Dhande and J Chakraborty. The book has been published by Wiley Eastern Ltd., New Delhi in 1977 and is being marketed by Wiley International Inc., New York City

"Computer Aided Design and Manufacture", by Sanjay G Dhande and S Sampath (editors). The book has been published by the Committee on Science & Technology in Developing Countries (COSTED), Singapore and is based on the proceedings of an international seminar on "CAD/CAM - Implications to Development in Asia" held at COSTED, Madras, September 1986.

"Computer Aided Engineering Graphics and Design ", by Sanjay G Dhande. The book-manuscript is under preparation. A contract for publication has been signed with Wiley Eastern Publishers Ltd., New Delhi The book is likely to be published.

== Awards and honours ==
1. (1963) "Best Outgoing Student of the class of '63 at Modern High School", Poona, India.

2. (1967) "Mr. D.P. Joshi and Mrs. J.D. Joshi Scholarship", Poona University.

3. (1968) "Mr. A.V.H. Pearce Scholarship", Poona University.

4. (1968) "Mr. D.P. Joshi and Mrs. J.D. Joshi Scholarship", Poona University.

5. (1968) "Kirloskar Brothers Ltd. Scholarship", Poona University.

6. (1968) "Best Student Award", Rotary Club, Poona.

7. (1969) "Principal G.K. Ogale Memorial Prize", Poona University.

8. (1969) "Gold Medal Award of the Institute of Engineers (India) for the overall performance in the Bachelor of Engineering programme".

9. (1987) "Distinguished Lecturer", Computer Society of India.

10. (1987) "Selected as a member of the TC 5.2 Working Group on CAD and Graphics of the International Federation of Information Processing (IFIP)", Zurich, Switzerland

11. (1990) "Distinguished Instructor (ME 5984, 89–90 / II, Virginia Tech)"

12. (1992) "Procter & Gamble Best Paper Award (jointly with Paul Tidwell", Charles Reinholtz et al.), ASME Conference.

13. (1996) "Distinguished Tutor (TA 101, 95–96 / II, IIT Kanpur)"

14. (1996) "Distinguished Teacher (TA 101, 96–97 / I & 96-97 / II, IIT Kanpur)"

15. (1997) "Distinguished Alumnus Award", College of Engineering, Poona University.

16. (2001) Elected as a Fellow of the Maharashtra Academy of Sciences.

17. (2002) Elected as a Fellow of the Indian National Academy of Engineering, New Delhi

18. (2003) Elected as a Fellow of the IETE, India.

19. (2006) Elected as a Fellow of The Institution of Engineers (India).
