= Vasantha Azhaippugal =

- Theatrical release poster
- Directed by: T. Rajendar
- Written by: T. Rajendar
- Produced by: Jeppiaar
- Starring: Vijayan; Roopa; Raveendar; T. Rajendar; Usha Rajendar
- Cinematography: Hemachandran
- Edited by: Devan
- Music by: T. Rajendar
- Production company: Jeppiaar Pictures
- Release date: 12 September 1980
- Country: India
- Language: Tamil

Vasantha Azhaippugal (transl. Spring calls) is a 1980 Indian Tamil-language film written, directed and scored by T. Rajendar, in his credited directorial debut and produced by Jeppiaar. The film stars Vijayan and Roopa, with Raveendar, Rajendar, Goundamani, Selvaraj, Usha Rajendar (credited as Ragini) and Jeppiaar in supporting roles. It was released on 12 September 1980, and did not perform well at the box office.

== Cast ==
- Vijayan as Dr. Vijayan
- Roopa as Roopa
- Raveendar
- T. Rajendar as Kandar
- Goundamani
- Selvaraj as Idichapuli
- Usha Rajendar (credited as Ragini)
- Jeppiaar

== Production ==
Vasantha Azhaippugal is the official directorial debut of Rajendar, following his uncredited work in Oru Thalai Ragam released earlier the same year. When Jeppiaar wanted to direct a film based on his own script inspired from real events, he approached Rajender to write screenplay and dialogues after he was impressed by his work in Oru Thalai Raagam. Since Jeppiaar had to concentrate on elections, he assigned Rajender to direct the film instead.

== Soundtrack ==
The music is composed by Rajendar, who also wrote the lyrics.

Track listing
No.	Title	Singer(s)	Length
1.	"Gangai Ponguthe"	P. Susheela	4:14
2.	"Kitta Vaadi"	S. P. Balasubrahmanyam	3:48
3.	"Ada Neela Selai"	Malaysia Vasudevan, S. Janaki	4:41
4.	"Devalogam Azhaiththaalum"	S. Janaki	5:36
Total length:			18:19

== Critical reception ==
Nalini Sastry of Kalki gave a review on this film in question and answer format where she felt actors like Vijayan and Raveendran come and go while actresses Roopa and Subha are watching and act. She also called comedy track as vulgar but called the film's cinematography and sound recording for having quality while citing composer gave music for namesake and called direction as cat on the wall and the film had no specific aspect and called it a mess. Anna appreciated the acting, music, direction and climax but felt the screenplay could have been better.

== Legacy ==
Selvaraj, who acted in this film, became known by the prefix Idichapuli after his character.
