= COEP Technological University =

Engineering college in Pune, Maharashtra

Coordinates: 18°31′50.02″N 73°51′24.43″E

COEP Technological University, Pune
- Former names: 1854–1864: Poona Engineering Class and Mechanical School 1865–1879: The Poona Civil Engineering College; 1879–1911: The College of Science (Agriculture and Forest Classes); 1911–2003: Government College of Engineering, Poona; 2003–2006: Pune Institute of Engineering and Technology; 2006–2022: College of Engineering, Pune 2022–present: COEP Technological University
- Motto: Strength Truth Endurance Ethics Reverence
- Type: state university
- Established: July 1854; 172 years ago
- Chairman: Vinayak Pai
- Vice-Chancellor: Sunil Bhirud
- Faculty: 20
- Administrative staff: 400
- Students: 4500
- Undergraduates: 2,800
- Postgraduates: 1,000
- Location: Shivajinagar, Pune, Maharashtra, India
- Campus: Urban, 36.81 acres
- Website: coeptech.ac.in

The College of Engineering Pune (COEP) Technological University is a unitary public university of the Government of Maharashtra, situated in Pune, Maharashtra, India. Established in 1854, it is the 3rd oldest engineering education institute in India, after the College of Engineering, Guindy (1794) and IIT Roorkee (1847). The students and alumni are colloquially referred to as COEPians. On 23 June 2022, the Government of Maharashtra issued a notification regarding upgrading the college to an independent technological university. On 24 March 2022, both the houses of the state government passed the CoEP Technological University bill, which has conferred a unitary state university status on the institute.

== History ==
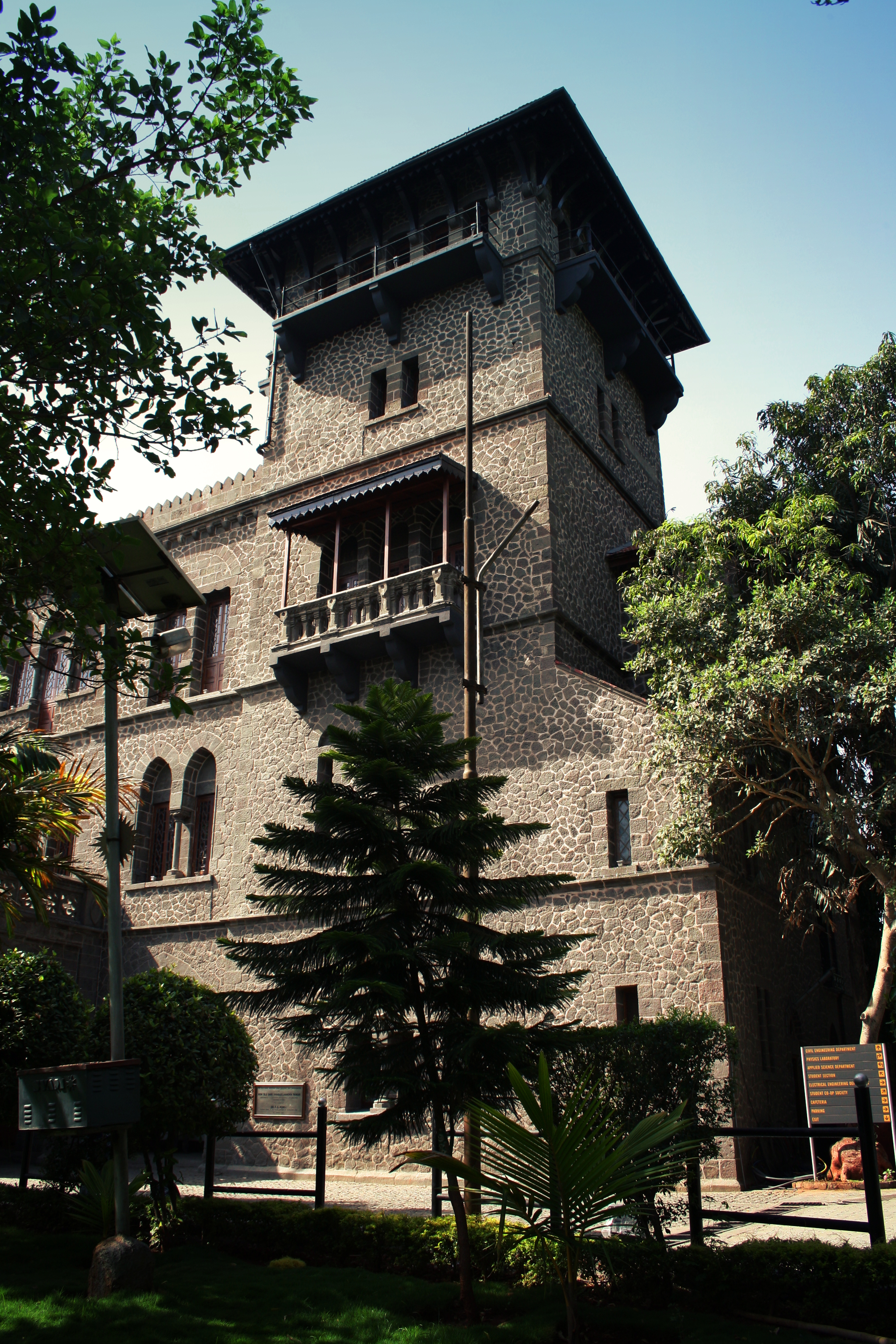
The main building of COEP, which houses the administrative wing

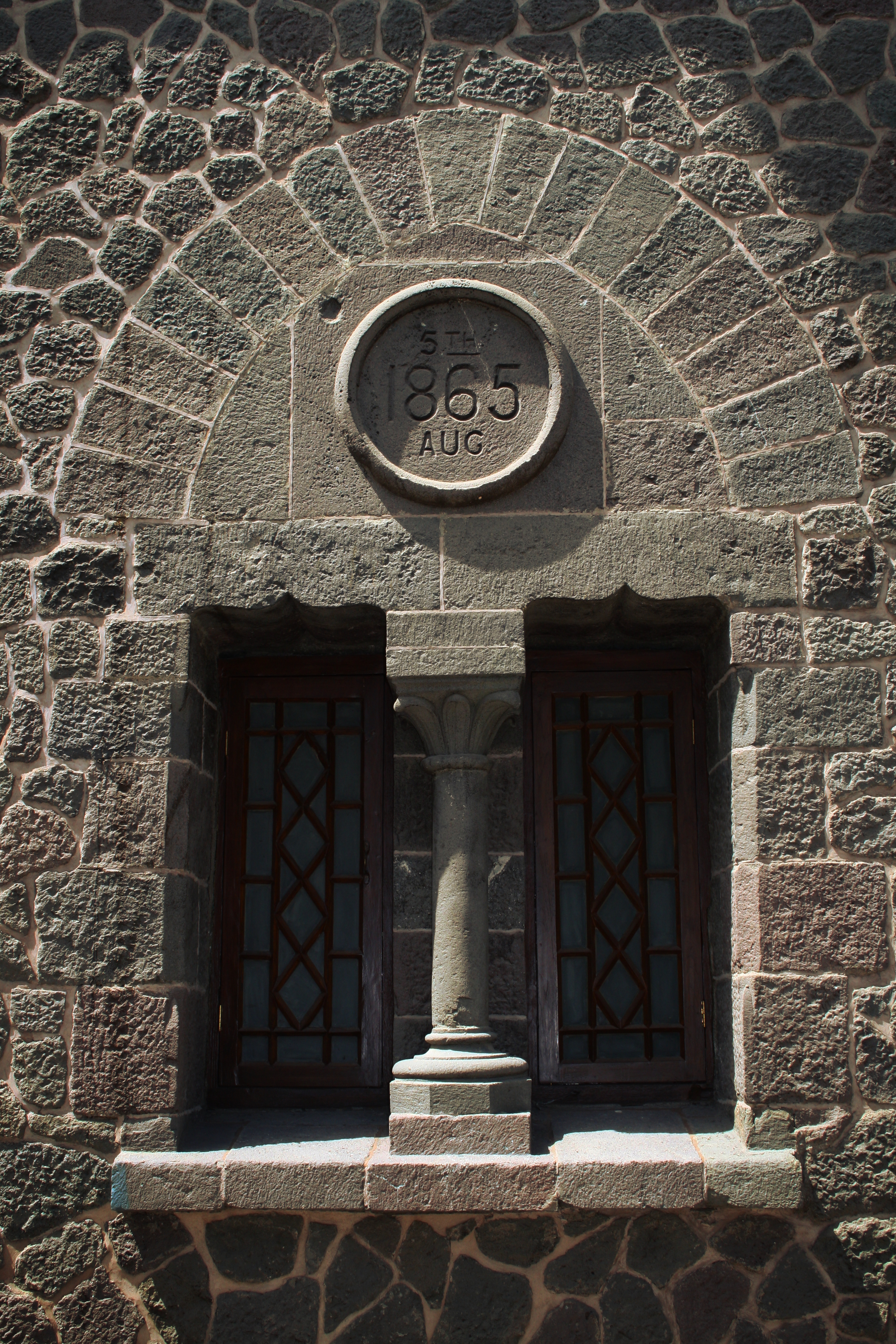
The foundation stone of COEP

The Poona Civil Engineering College, around 1875

The institution was started in July 1854 at Pune, as the "Poona Engineering and Mechanical School", to train public works department (PWD) officials and was housed in Bhawanipeth, Poona in three houses for teaching purpose and a separate house for principal to train subordinate officers in the Public Works Department. In July 1857, Henry Coke was given the charge of the institute. Admission was open to all, irrespective of nationality or caste. Good proficiency in English and basic knowledge of Mathematics were a prerequisite for getting admitted to the institute. The process of admission required that the aspiring candidate apply to the nearest government English school, to whom the entrance examination papers were handed over. The headmaster would take the examination on a date deemed convenient to him and submit the answer sheets to Henry Coke, the in-charge of the mechanical school. After examining the papers, Coke would notify the headmaster of the school with the names of candidates who were deemed fit for admission. Scholarships of ₹ 6 were offered per month after a period of six months of training in the mechanical school for fifteen students. The courses offered included Mathematics, Drawing, Surveying and levelling, building and construction and setting out works on the ground. The course would run for a period of two years.

Later on, in the year 1865, the school was renamed to "Poona Civil Engineering College". The foundation stone of the new college was laid by the Governor of Bombay, Sir Bartle Frere, who was to become the Vice-Chancellor of the University, on 5 August 1865. In June of the following year, Theodore Cooke M.A., was appointed the Principal. He went on to hold the office for the next 28 years. It started a course in Licensed and civil engineering (LCE) and trained masons and overseers. Later it secured affiliation to the Bombay university. The course was revised in 1886 and the minimum criteria required for admission was raised from Matriculation to the then Previous Examination.

In 1879 two new classes, an Agricultural class and a Forest class, were added to the college, and the name of the college was changed from "The Poona Civil Engineering College " to "The College of Science".

In 1909, the LCE was converted into the BE degree and the first batch of students passed out in 1912. All non-engineering courses were stopped by 1911, transferring the Bachelor of Science degree to the "Science Institute of Bombay" and subsequently in the year 1911, the name was changed to the "Government College of Engineering, Poona".

The institution was initially affiliated to the University of Bombay (now Mumbai) for a degree of Licentiate in Civil Engineering known as LCE in 1858. The certificate course was converted into a civil engineering degree course in 1908 and degree programs in mechanical engineering and electrical engineering were started in 1912 and 1932, respectively. After the University of Poona was established in 1948, the college became affiliated to the new university. In 1968, the three-year degree was extended to 4 years constituting 8 semesters.

In 2003, the institute was granted complete autonomy by the State Government of Maharashtra, thus giving it the freedom to set its own curriculum and manage its own finances. The institute was renamed "Pune Institute of Engineering and Technology". This was soon changed to present "College of Engineering, Pune" in 2006. With permanent affiliation to the Savitribai Phule Pune University, the institute now is an autonomous engineering school. This has been the biggest change as far as pedagogy at COEP is concerned.

In a bid to boost research in engineering and postdoctoral research, COEP was granted an additional campus on government land located in Chikhali, PCMC. This extended campus is having area of 40 acres. In academic year 2020-21 institute also commenced full time degree course in management under faculty of Management.

== Campus ==
The campus of COEP is spread over 36 acres. The campus is divided into four parts North Campus, South Campus, Hostel campus and Playground, due to roadways in between.

The main building is the present day administrative building of the College. It houses the Director, the Dean Academic Affairs, the Dean Student Affairs, the Gymkhana, the Examination cell and other various important administrative heads of the college. The building is almost three floors tall with a base floor length of 18 meters and a width of 9 metres. The building was refurbished in 2012.

== Academics ==
=== Admissions ===
The admissions are conducted on the basis of the marks secured in Maharashtra CET and HSC board combined. These admissions are conducted by the Directorate of Technical Education (DTE) through the Centralized Admission Process (CAP). Several admissions to direct second year of BTech course are also conducted for those candidates who have completed Diploma in Engineering at different polytechnic institutes in the state of Maharashtra. These admissions are conducted through the Centralized Admission Process (CAP) by DTE itself.

The M.tech admissions are on the basis of the Graduate Aptitude Test in Engineering (GATE) conducted by the seven old IITs and the IISc.

The college also provides Doctor of Philosophy (PhD) programmes in various fields. Department of Applied Sciences is a recognised PhD research centre in the subjects of Environmental Sciences and Chemistry.

=== Rankings ===
College rankings

General – India
- NIRF (Overall) (2023): 151-200

Engineering – India
- NIRF (2023): 73
- NIRF (2024): 77
- Government colleges
- Outlook India (2022): 12

COEP was ranked 12th among government engineering colleges in India by Outlook India in 2022. The NIRF ranked it 73rd in the engineering ranking in 2023 and 151-200 band overall.

== Student life ==
=== Fests ===
==== Regatta ====
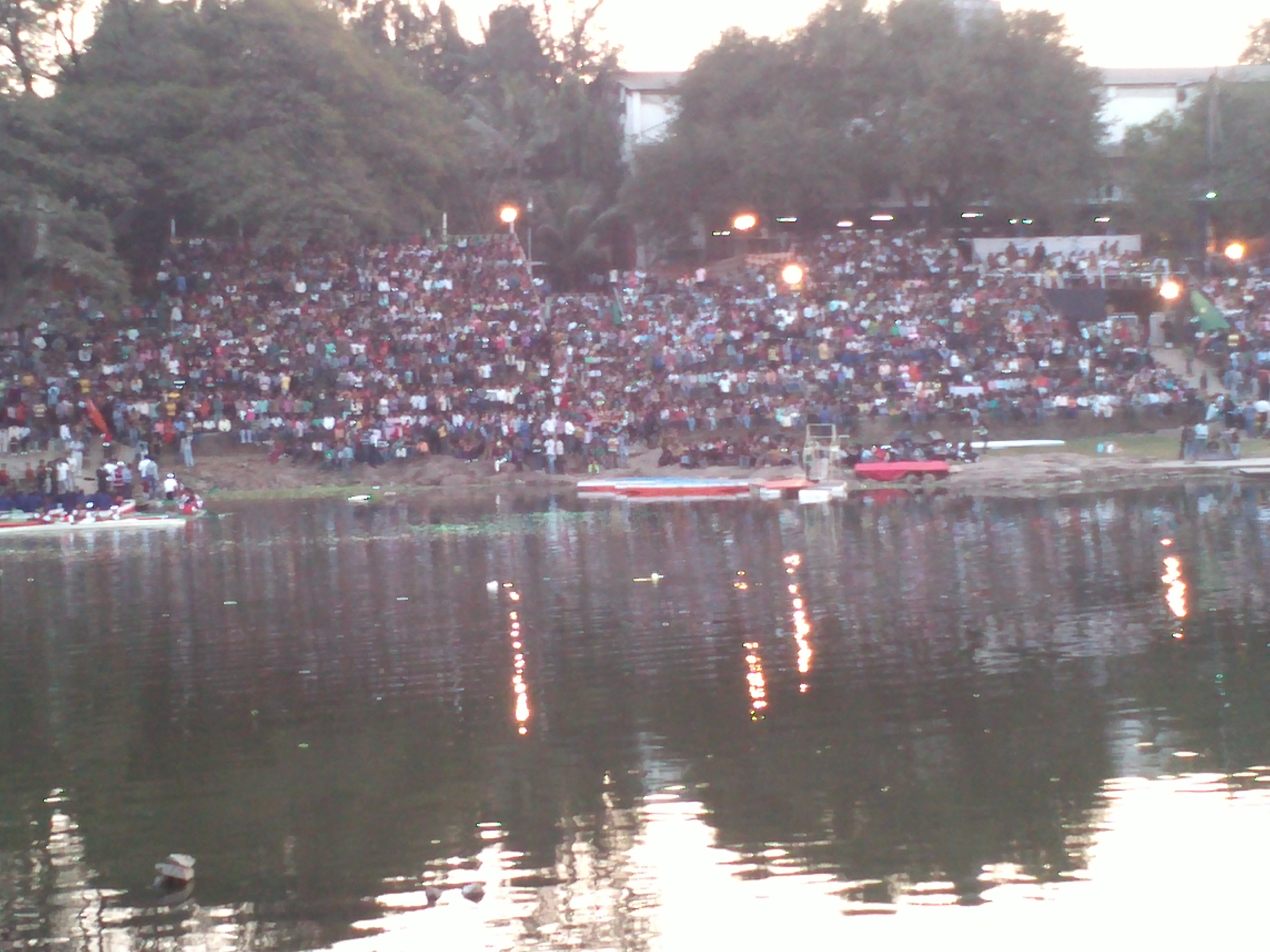
People witnessing the 83rd Regatta

Regetta is an annual regatta hosted by Students of the College of Engineering, Pune. Since its inception in 1928, it has showcased around 165 boats, notably the Eighter, which is one of the oldest boats. The 95th edition of Regatta was held on 26 March 2023. Unlike a Regatta which means a collection of boat races, COEP Boat Club's Regatta is a show of various kinds of boats, kayaks, punts, shell boats and scull boats. The events in this show are Telematches, Kayak Ballet, Shell Games, Punt Formation, Mashaal Dance and the Arrow formation.

==== MindSpark ====
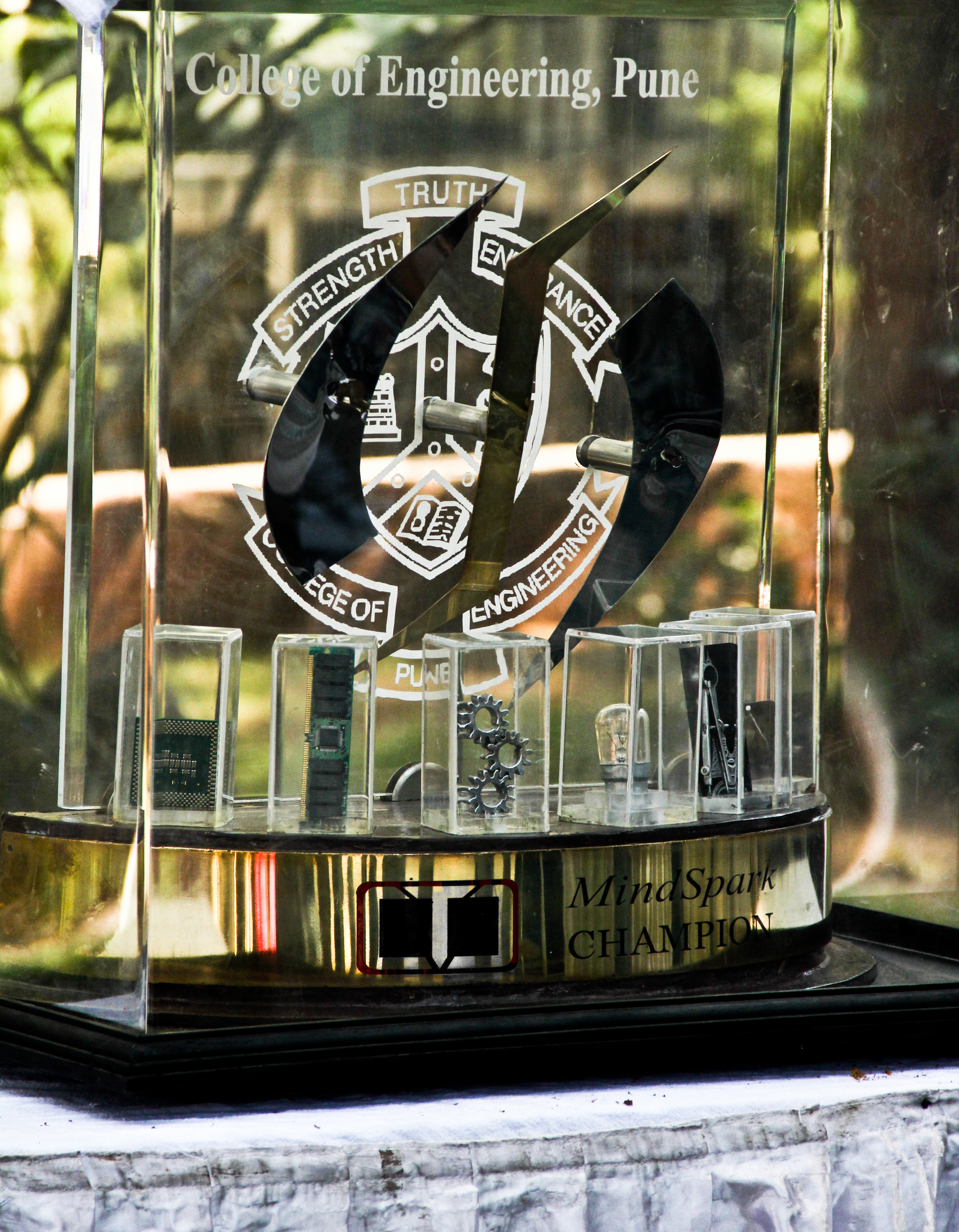
The MindSpark Championship trophy

MindSpark is the annual technical festival hosted by the college and established in 2007. The idea behind MindSpark originated from the need to unite various departmental level festivals that were scattered across the academic calendar. It features about 50 events across various disciplines of engineering and has been backed by the support of industrial sponsors who also associate with COEP for placement. This event is usually scheduled in an odd semester (around September) and is of 3 days (usually weekend).

==== ZEST ====
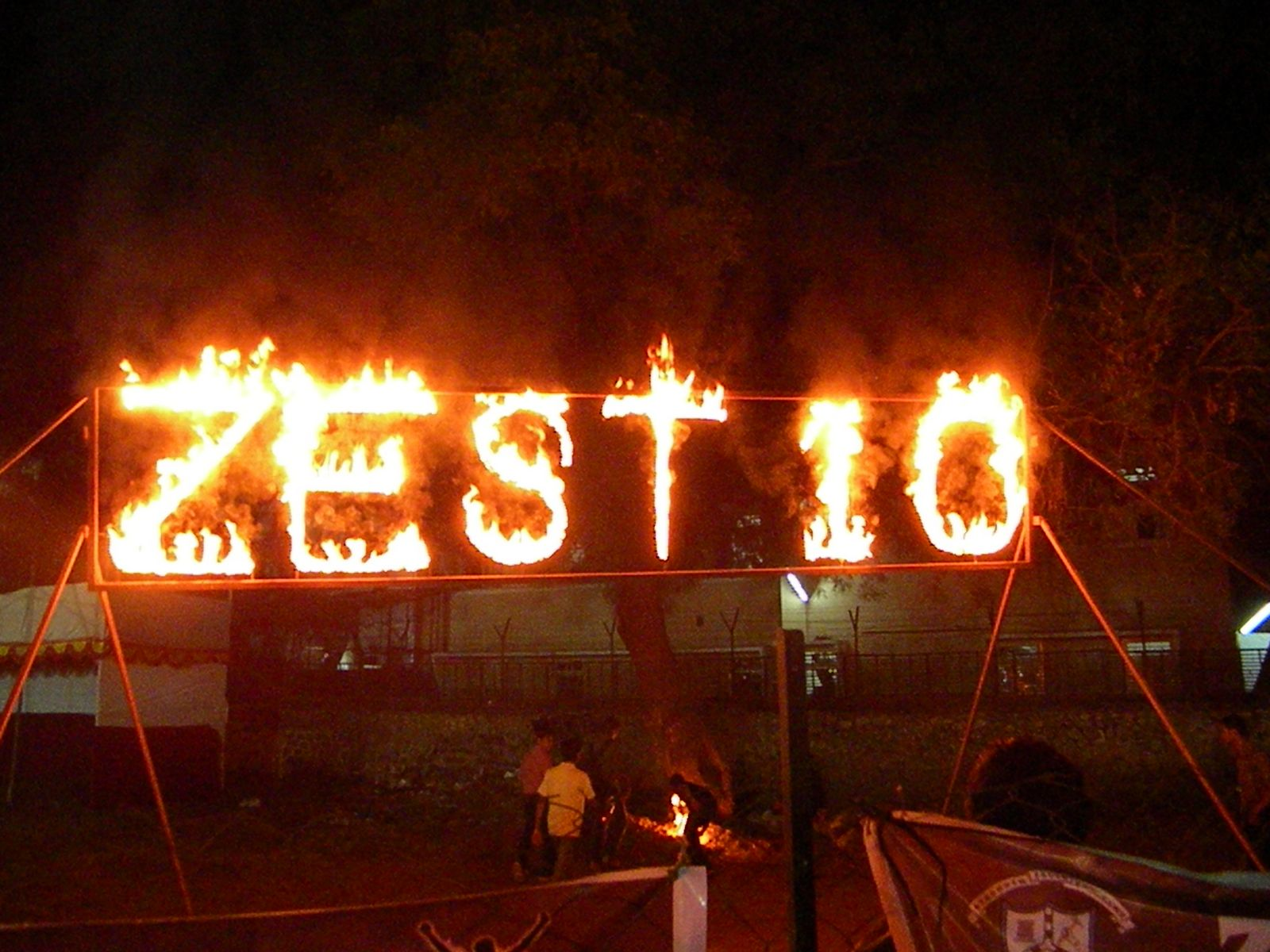
Firework display at Zest 2010

ZEST is the annual sports festival of COEP Technological University carrying the legacy since its beginning in the year 2002. More than 70 colleges across the country participate in the same. ZEST nurtures the idea "For the students, by the students". ZEST is a 3-day sporting extravaganza in which 20+ sports are played on a large-covered COEP Playground. It is a battlefield where there are no limits to challenges. In addition to this, ZEST hosts flagship events like Cyclothon, Marathon, Self-Defence Workshops, Fitness Sessions, and Sportsdeck Sessions. ZEST is graced with eminent chief guests like Kedar Jadhav, Geeta Phogat, Sandeep Singh, Lalita Babar, Rahi Sarnobat, Sultan Dange, Milkha Singh, Shireen Limaye, Aslam Inamdar, Mohit Goyat, Yogesh Nikam.

==== Impressions ====
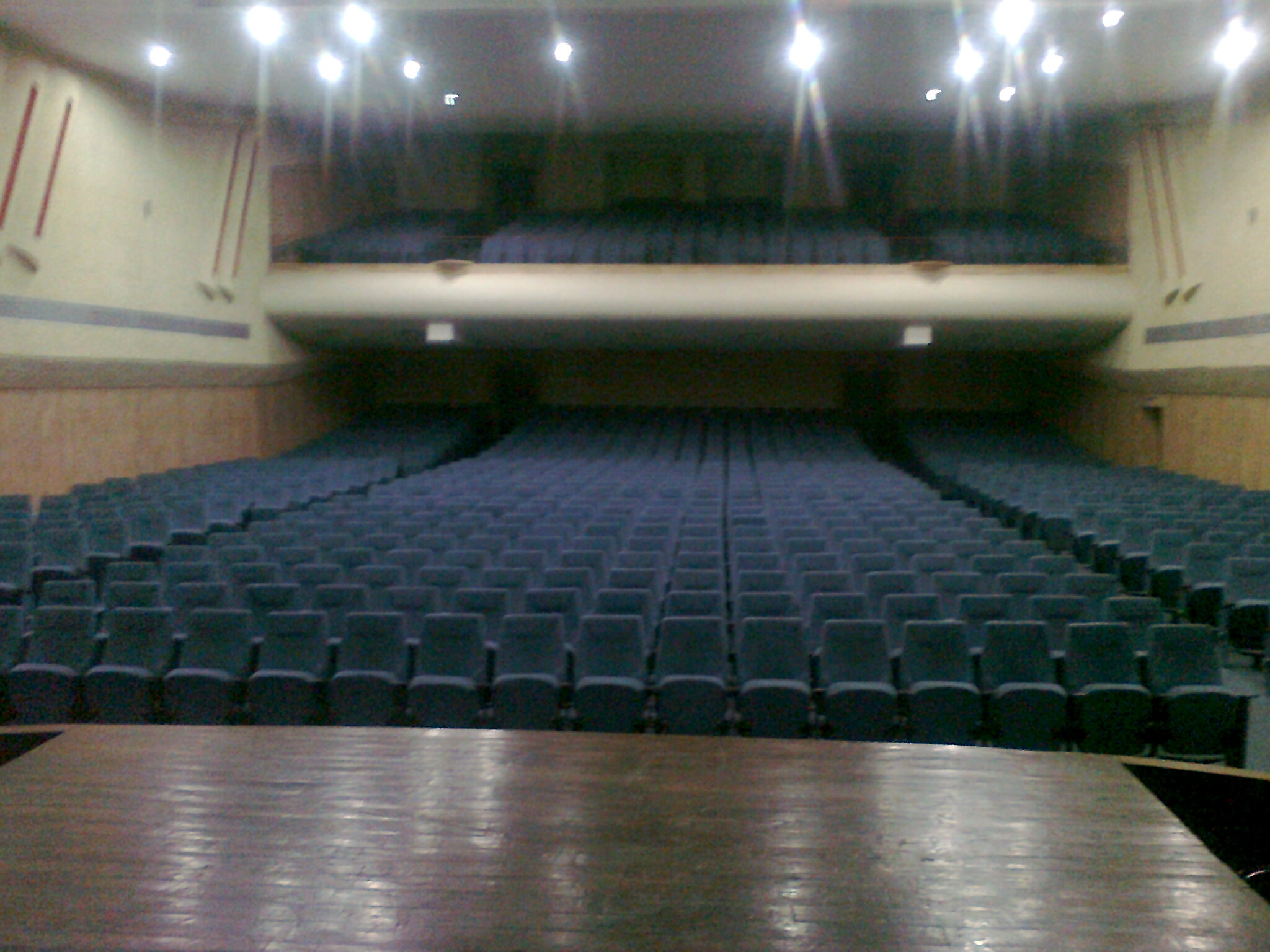
The auditorium of the College, in which most of the cultural and academic events are held.

Impressions is the annual cultural festival of CoEP, which is held every year in the 2nd week of December and lasts for 3 days. Impressions was formed as a platform "For the Artists, By the Artists", to provide opportunities for people from the fields of Dance, Music, Theater, Art, and Fashion to display their talent. The events span over six main modules, namely – Dance, Music, Arts and Crafts, Dramatics, Photography, and Writing.

=== Student clubs and chapters ===
==== CSI COEP Student Chapter ====
The Computer Society of India (CSI) Student Chapter of College of Engineering Pune (COEP), established in October 2018 is the college's largest technical chapter. It organizes a number of technical activities including workshops, competitions, technical symposiums, guest lectures etc. for its student members. Under the guidance of Department of Computer Engineering and Information Technology COEP, the student chapter has over 300 members and is run by a Core Team and faculty from the department.

==== Team Nemesis Racing (Baja SAE) ====
Baja SAE is a world-wide event which comprises designing, fabricating, assembling an all-terrain four wheeler vehicle and running it on a specially prepared torturous track in a grueling competition for four hours. COEP's team is called Team Nemesis Racing.

COEP won overall championship at BAJA 2017 competition held at Pithampur, near Indore at the National Automotive Testing and R&D Infrastructure Project. The team also won the Best Acceleration, the Raftaar award, Computer-aided engineering award, Best Build Quality, Endurance winner awards.

BAJA 2015 witnessed COEP starting at the pole position in the race consecutively for the fourth time by being the fastest vehicle. COEP received a total of following 9 awards in BAJA competition 2015, Overall-1st, Durability −1st, Acceleration-1st, Hill Climb-1st, Raftaar-1st, Innovation-2nd, CAE −2nd, Build Quality- 2nd, Safest Vehicle −2nd.

BAJA 2016 was held at Pithampur, Indore on 21 February 2016. COEP started at the pole position in the race consecutively for the fifth time by being the fastest vehicle. Out of the 14 award categories, COEP won 11 awards in BAJA competition 2016 retaining the Overall Championship.

COEP won overall championship at BAJA 2017 competition creating a hat trick of records. In the 10th edition of Mahindra BAJA, a total of 415 entries applied for the event from 185 colleges that participated at a virtual stage, out of which 150 teams were selected for m- BAJA, while 35 teams for eBAJA. In the final round or the endurance test, 118 teams participated in the competition which was held from 16 to 21 February 2017 at the NATRIP facility in Pithampur, Indore. Out of the 12 award categories, COEP won 7 awards in BAJA competition 2017 retaining the Overall Championship.

==== COEP robotics team ====
COEP's Robotics Team is represented by the Robot Study Circle(RSC). The Club has industrial collaboration with Siemens PLM as a title sponsor, Janatics Pneumatics, Schmalz India, Pepperl & Fuchs, and Robolab Technologies. Members of RSC are members of the first ever institute student chapter of THE ROBOTICS SOCIETY established in India at College of Engineering Pune. The robotics team has a number of awards and in 2017 team won the national ABU Robocon, going on to represent India in International Robocon held at Tokyo, Japan. RSC placed 6th.

==== COEP satellite team ====
The satellite team also known as CSAT is CoEP's satellite initiative. They worked on project Swayam a 1-U picosatellite which was launched by ISRO on 22 June 2016. After the successful launch of Swayam, CSAT is now working on its next mission: an experiment for alternate means of space travel with the help of solar sails.

==== Aerial Robot Study Circle ====
The Aerial Robot Study Circle (ARSC) is a student club at COEP Technological University dedicated to advancing aerial robotics. Driven to build drones for competitions and real-world applications, ARSC routinely organizes seminars, invites industry experts, and competes in national/international contests like AeroTHON. Key activities include constructing specialized drones, hosting robotics events, honoring national occasions, and delivering impactful societal projects.

==== COEP's Free Software Users Group ====
The COEP's Free Software Users Group (COFSUG) is a volunteer group at the COEP Technological University that promotes the use and development of free and open source software. COFSUG runs the FOSS Lab, FOSS Server, COEP Moodle, COEP LDAP Server, and COEP Wiki. The group carries out activities like installation festivals to teach Linux, workshops on Linux administration, Python, Drupal, and FOSS technologies, promoting software development under the GNU GPLv3 license, Freedom Fridays to spread FOSS philosophy, hosting the Fedora Users and Developers Conference 2011, Android app development workshops, spoken tutorials program from IIT Bombay, and summer coding projects for students on FOSS contributions.

=== Participation in Guinness World Records ===
The college has made three entries so far in the Guinness World Record books. It holds the record for "Most people skipping on the same rope", which still stands as the world record and "The longest painting by numbers" and for "Most number of people solving the Rubik's cube".

== Notable alumni ==
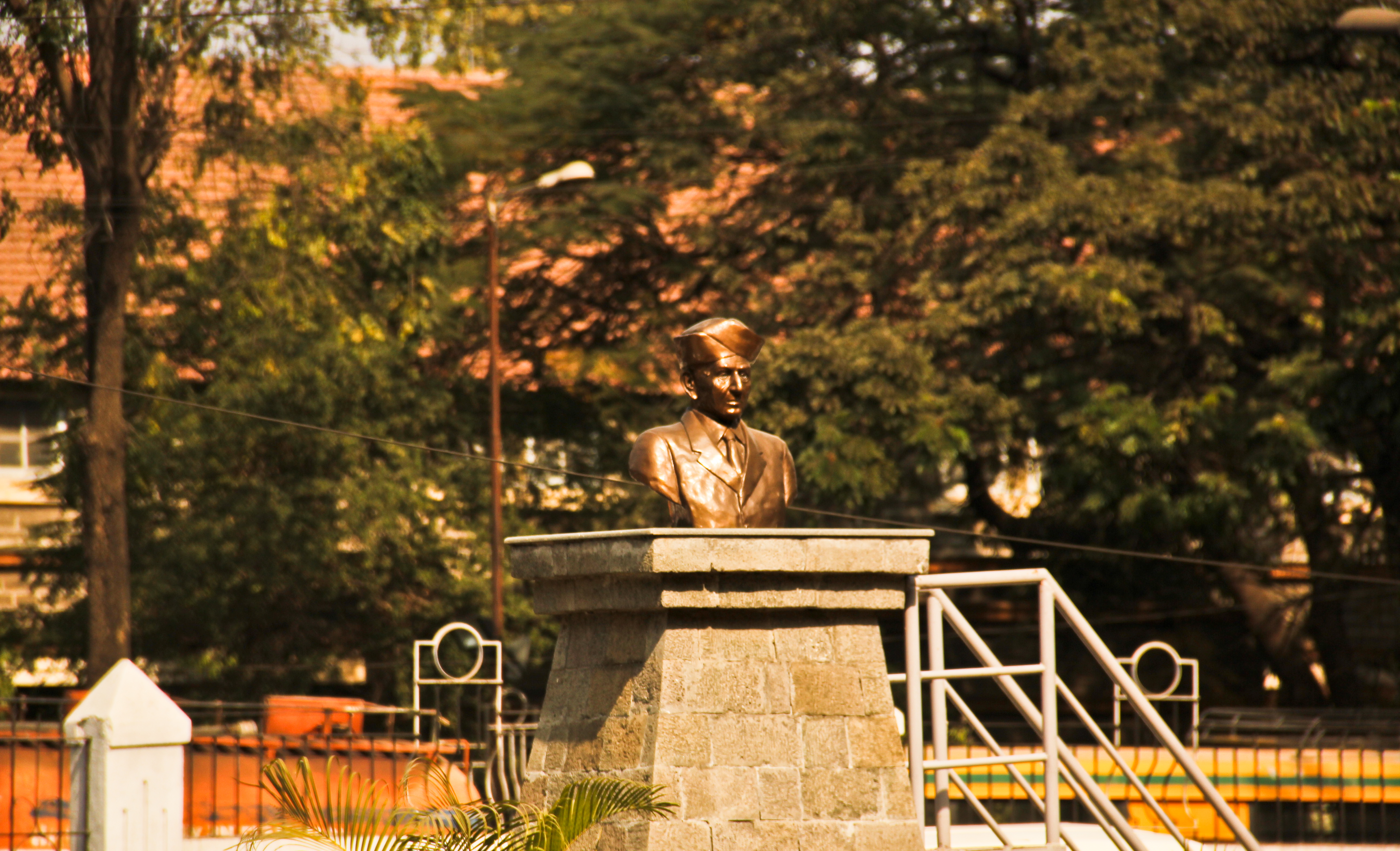
Bust of M. Visvesvaraya facing the main building

- Rajiv Bajaj, Managing Director of Bajaj Auto: One of the largest two-wheeler manufacturer in India
- Thakkar Bapa, also known as Amritlal Vithaldas Thakkar, was an Indian social worker dedicated to the upliftment of tribal and Harijan communities in Gujarat. He played key roles in founding organizations like Bhil Seva Mandal and Harijan Sevak Sangh. Thakkar Bapa's extensive travels and efforts spanned across India, earning him the title "Father of Harijans".
- Gaur Gopal Das, an Indian monk, motivational speaker and lifestyle coach.
- Sanjay Govind Dhande, Padma Shri, an Indian engineer and educationist. He was the director of the Indian Institute of Technology Kanpur.
- Aravind Joshi, emeritus professor of Computer and Cognitive Science at the University of Pennsylvania.
- Thomas Kailath, emeritus professor of engineering at Stanford University, winner of the IEEE Shannon Award and US National Medal of Science
- Vijay Kelkar, Padma Vibhushan, Advisor to the Finance Minister, Government of India in the rank of a Minister of State, Chairman, National Stock Exchange of India
- Sumant Moolgaokar, Padma Bhushan, he was an Indian industrialist, known as architect of Tata Motors. He was the chief executive of Tata Engineering and Locomotive Company (TELCO). He also remained Vice-Chairman of Tata Steel and served as non-executive chairman of Maruti Suzuki.
- Milind Mulick, Indian watercolour painter, teacher, and author
- Laxman Narasimhan, an Indian-American business executive, former CEO of Starbucks Corporation, and has previously served as CEO of Reckitt Benckiser, and Chief Commercial Officer at PepsiCo.
- Vinayak Pai, Managing Director and Chief Executive Officer (CEO) of Tata Projects
- Nitin Paranjpe, President of the Foods & Refreshment Division of Unilever
- Suhas V Patankar, pioneer in the field of computational fluid dynamics (CFD) and Finite volume method. Notable as the co-developer of the SIMPLE algorithm in the field of Computational Fluid Dynamics (CFD). He is currently a Professor Emeritus at the University of Minnesota.
- C. Kumar N. Patel, Vice Chancellor for Research at the University of California, Los Angeles, inventor of the carbon-dioxide laser, winner of the United States National Medal of Science
- Lila Poonawalla, Padma Shri, an Indian industrialist, philanthropist, and humanitarian. First Woman Engineer graduating from the Mechanical stream.
- Ramesh Raskar, Associate Professor at Massachusetts Institute of Technology, Director of MIT Media Lab's Camera Culture group and developer of a high-speed femto-camera that captures pictures of light.
- Baburao Govindrao Shirke, Founder of B. G. Shirke & Company
- Sir M. Visvesvaraya (1861–1962), recipient of Bharat Ratna and Knighthood, eminent engineer and statesman
- Atul Kulkarni, (Dropout), Actor, producer, and screenwriter who works in Hindi, Marathi, Kannada, Malayalam, Tamil, Telugu, and English language films. Recipient of National Film Awards.
- Jaydeep Kulkarni, Associate Professor at The University of Texas at Austin, Fellow of Silicon Laboratories Endowed Chair in Electrical Engineering

== See also ==
- Government College of Engineering, Amravati
- Government College of Engineering, Aurangabad
- Government College of Engineering, Chandrapur
- Government College of Engineering, Karad
- Shri Guru Gobind Singhji Institute of Engineering and Technology, Nanded
