= SathyabamaSat =

Indian experimental weather satellite

- Mission type: Student Satellite
- Operator: ISRO
- COSPAR ID: 2016-040B
- SATCAT no.: 41600
- Mission duration: 5 years

Spacecraft properties
- Bus: PSLV-C34
- Manufacturer: ISRO
- Dry mass: 1.5 kg

Start of mission
- Launch date: June 22, 2016
- Rocket: PSLV
- Launch site: Satish Dhawan SLP

Orbital parameters
- Reference system: Geocentric
- Regime: Low Earth
- Perigee altitude: 502.9 km
- Apogee altitude: 525.2 km
- Inclination: 97.5 degrees

SathyabamaSat is a micro experimental weather satellite developed by students and faculty of Sathyabama University, Chennai to collect data on greenhouse gases (water vapor, carbon monoxide, carbon dioxide, methane and hydrogen fluoride). It was launched along with the Cartosat-2C satellite atop PSLV-C34. It was launched June 22, 2016.

== History ==
The development of SathyabamaSat was initiated in 2009 when ISRO and Sathyabama University signed a memorandum of understanding to support the design, development and launch of the satellite. Initially, a space technology centre was established to carry out preliminary studies about the project including advanced research in rocketry, satellites and space applications, the project was carried out with the assistance of ISRO scientists. As per the university, the objective of project was to provide development experience of compact space systems to students.

== Payloads ==
The satellite uses ARGUS 1000 IR spectrometer to measure the densities of the green house gases over the region in which it moves. The satellite delivers the data to the On-Board Computer (OBC) for transmission, when it crosses the radio window of ground station, which is being built in Sathyabama University premises, Chennai, India.

== Launch ==
The satellite was launched as a piggyback atop Cartosat-2C using PSLV-C34 on June 22, 2016.
