= Sathyabama Institute of Science and Technology =

University in Chennai, Tamil Nadu

Sathyabama Institute of Science and Technology (SIST)
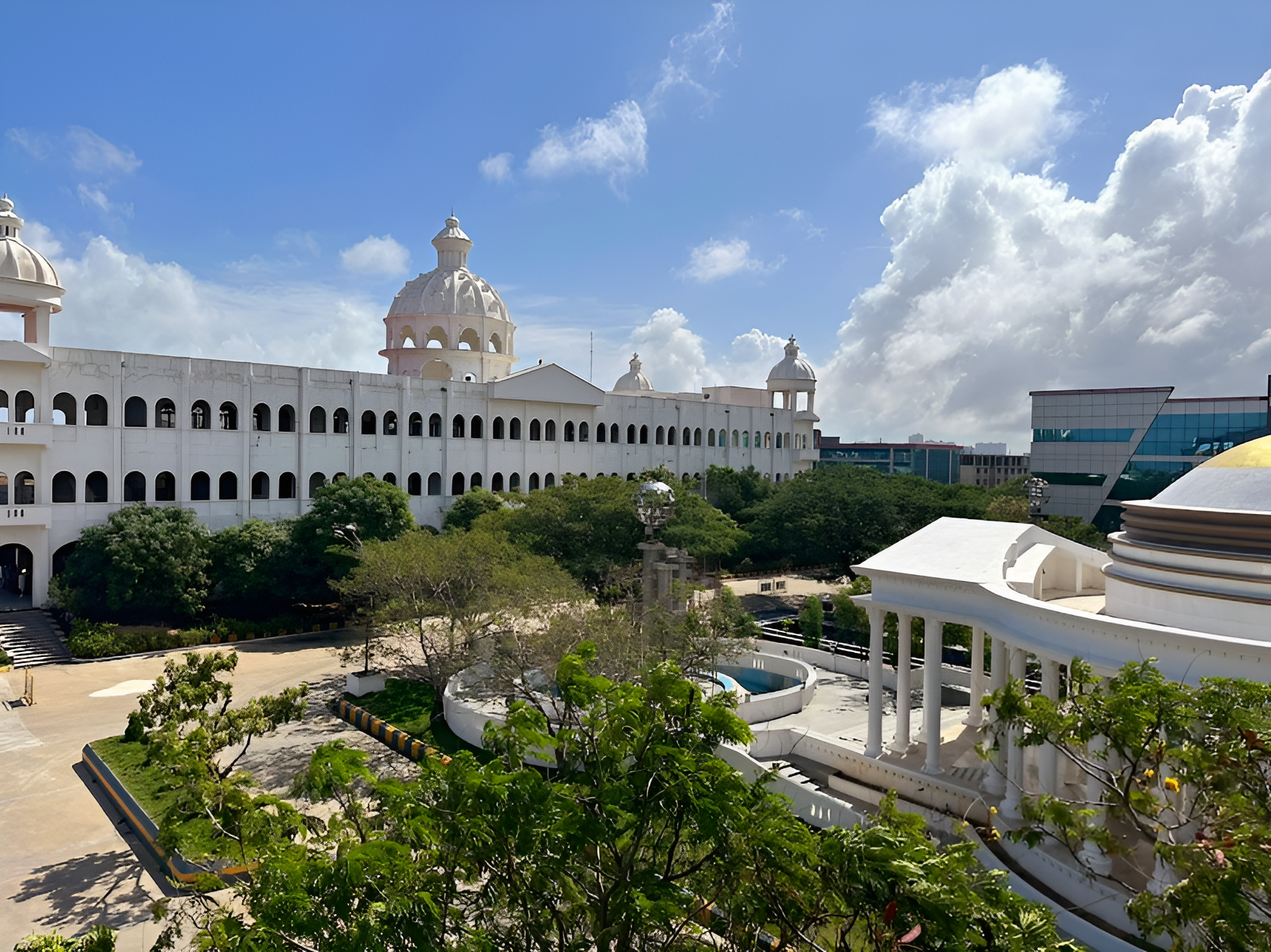
- Main administrative building
- Former names: Sathyabama University, Sathyabama Engineering College
- Motto: Oru ciṟanta nāḷaikkāka oṉṟāka iruṅkaḷ (Tamil)
- Motto in English: Together for a better tomorrow
- Type: Private research university
- Established: 1987; 39 years ago
- Founder: Jeppiaar Jesuadimai
- Accreditation: NAAC Grade "A++"
- Affiliations: UGC, AICTE, COA, DCI, BCI, NBA, ABET
- Chancellor: Mariazeena Johnson
- Vice-Chancellor: T. Sasipraba
- President: Marie Johnson
- Faculty: 721
- Administrative staff: 125
- Students: 15,600
- Undergraduates: 13,400
- Postgraduates: 1,900
- Doctoral students: 300
- Location: Chennai, Tamil Nadu, India; 12°52′23″N 80°13′19″E
- Campus: 140 acres; Suburban
- NIRF 2026 ranking: 53
- Colours: White and Blue
- Website: www.sathyabama.ac.in

Sathyabama Institute of Science and Technology (SIST), formerly known as Sathyabama Engineering College and Sathyabama University, is a private, research, STEM-intensive, multi-disciplinary deemed university in Chennai, Tamil Nadu, India. Established in the year 1987 by industrialist Jeppiaar Jesuadimai, it is a Christian minority educational institution with its patron as Saint Anthony. The university is a research institute that specializes in the engineering fields, and has been accredited with Grade "A++" by the National Assessment and Accreditation Council (NAAC) and "Category 1 University" by the University Grants Commission (UGC).

Sathyabama's main campus is at Sholinganallur, with the dental college nearby at Sithalapakkam and a secondary satellite campus at Sriperumbudur. The main campus spans across a 140-acres suburban setting located along the IT Corridor, and its buildings include a research hospital, three aeronautical hangars, a science research park, a central library, a dental college, a nanotechnology centre, innovation hubs, and 17 STEM-oriented research wings.

The university is an ISO 9001:2008 certified institute and has research partnerships with governmental bodies. In 2016, it built and launched its space weather satellite, known as the SathyabamaSat, in collaboration with ISRO, India's national space agency. Sathyabama has 15 departments that offer 48 accredited undergraduate programs and 23 accredited postgraduate programs, mostly in the field of engineering, but also in science, technology, law, architecture, medicine, and management.

The institute was known for its strict enforcement of moral rules and discipline among students, including gender segregation, and this has often been met with criticism in the past. With 15,600 students, it is one of the largest private universities in Tamil Nadu.

== History ==
It was founded in 1987 as Sathyabama Engineering College by industrialist Jeppiaar Jesuadimai, as an engineering-focused institution. The university was established to provide higher technical education to the Christian minorities residing in Tamil Nadu and other South Indian states. The patron saint of the university is St Anthony. It was formerly known as Sathyabama University, and was renamed as Sathyabama Institute of Science and Technology (SIST) in 2018 following a central directive by the Indian government. It received its deemed-to-be-university status from the Ministry of Human Resources Development in 2001, under Section 3 of the UGC Act, 1956.

Starting in the late 1990s Sathyabama expanded its curriculum to include courses in science, law and management. The dental college was established in 2009, and is one of the largest university medical centers in Chennai.

== Milestones ==
1987	College founded in Chennai, as Sathyabama Engineering College
2001	College renamed as Sathyabama University
2001	Received its "Deemed-to-be-university" status from the Ministry of Human Resource Development (MHRD)
2009	Establishment of Sathyabama Dental College
2012	Accredited as "Category A" university by the Ministry of Human Resource Development (MHRD)
2016	Sathyabama weather satellite "SathyabamaSat" launched with assistance from ISRO
2017	Accredited with Grade "A" by National Assessment and Accreditation Council (NAAC)
2018	Name changed to Sathyabama Institute of Science and Technology (SIST)
2019	Received 5 QS-stars for excellence
2021	Received National Board of Accreditation (NBA) certification for 11 academic programmes
2023	Second university campus opened near Sriperumbudur
2023	Accredited with Grade "A++" by National Assessment and Accreditation Council (NAAC)
2023	Accredited with "Category-I University" by University Grants Commission (UGC)

== Campus ==
The main campus at Sholinganallur was constructed above an old swamp, which has led to severe flooding during the rainy seasons. The campus has many white and blue buildings designed in concentric patterns, and includes 5 hostels for male students and another 5 hostels for female students.

A secondary satellite campus was established at Sriperumpudur, to increase the student in-take. It offers engineering and science courses with the same accreditations as the main campus. The two campuses are approximately 45 kilometers apart.

== Location ==
The university is located in Sholinganallur, Chennai. It has a campus of 140 acres. The campus is adjacent to Rajiv Gandhi Salai (formerly known as Old Mahabalipuram Road and popularly known as the "IT Corridor"). The university also obtained authorization from the Ministry of Education, on the recommendation of the UGC, to open a secondary satellite campus at Vadamangalam, in Sriperumbudur.

== Academics ==
Sathyabama University has 15 departments that offer more than 48 accredited undergraduate programs and 23 accredited postgraduate programs. These include:

Departments
Faculty	Fields
Faculty of Engineering	Computer Science and Engineering; Artificial Intelligence and Data Science; Computer Science and Business Systems; Electrical and Electronics Engineering; Electronics and Communication Engineering; Mechanical Engineering; Mechatronics; Aeronautical Engineering; Civil Engineering; Information Technology; Chemical Engineering; Bio Technology; Bio Medical Engineering; Engineering Design
Faculty of Architecture	Architecture; Sustainable Architecture; Building Management; Landscape Design; Interior Design
Faculty of Medicine and Pharmacy	Pharmacy; Nursing; Physiotherapy; Dental Surgery; Preventive Dentistry; Conservative Dentistry and Endodontics; Orthodontics and Dentofacial Orthopedics; Medical Sciences; General Medicine
Faculty of Law	Law; Legal Studies; Constitutional Law and Legal Order; Intellectual Property Laws; Criminal Law
Faculty of Arts, Science and Humanities	Business Administration; Commerce; Financial Accounting; Visual Communication; Physics; Chemistry; Computer Science; Mathematics; Bio Chemistry; Fashion Design; Bio Technology; Micro Biology; Psychology; English; Bio Informatics and Data Science; Clinical Nutrition and Dietetics; Medical Lab Technology; Artificial Intelligence; Hotel Management and Catering; Data Science; Information Technology; Computer Applications
Faculty of Specialized Engineering	Applied Electronics; Computer Aided Design; Structural Engineering; Power Electronics and Industrial Drives; Medical Instrumentation; Embedded Systems and IoT; Mechanical Production Engineering; Aeronautical Engineering; Robotics Engineering; Nanotechnology; Aerospace Engineering

== Accreditation and certification ==
Sathyabama Institute of Science and Technology has been accredited with the 'A++' grade by NAAC and is a 'Category 1 University' under the UGC. It has received ISO 9001:2008 certification. The university also received the full five 'QS stars' for excellence by Quacquarelli Symonds, making it one of 40 universities in India to have done so.

The majority of the courses are accredited by national governmental bodies. The university's dental courses are accredited by the Dental Council of India, legal courses are accredited by the Bar Council of India, design courses are accredited by the Council of Architecture, and engineering courses are accredited by the Accreditation Board for Engineering and Technology.

== Collaboration with ISRO ==
The weather satellite SathyabamaSat was launched along with the Cartosat-2C satellite onboard PSLV-C34 on June 22, 2016. The development was initiated in 2009 when ISRO and Sathyabama University signed a memorandum of understanding (MoU) to work together on the design, construction, development, testing and launch of the experimental weather satellite. Initially, a space technology centre was established at the university to carry out preliminary studies about the project. This included advanced research in rocketry, satellites and space applications, and the project was carried out with the assistance of ISRO scientists over a period of 7 years. As per the university, the objective of the joint project was to provide development experience of compact space systems to students in the aerospace and aeronautical engineering department.

== Rankings ==
In 2025, the university was ranked 53rd among universities, 67th among engineering colleges and 93rd overall in India according to NIRF (National Institutional Ranking Framework). Sathyabama is ranked in the 1201-1400 band in global rankings and 373rd in Asia by the QS World University Rankings system in academic year 2024-2025, and 501st in Asia by the Times Higher Education World University Rankings system in academic year 2024-2025.

University rankings

General – international
- QS (World) (2025): 1201
- QS (Asia) (2024): 373
- Times (Asia) (2024): 501

General – India
- NIRF (Overall) (2024): 85

Engineering – India
- NIRF (2024): 66

== Research centers and facilities ==
=== Co-curricular activities ===
Sathyabama University offers on-campus training. Some of the facilities include Inplant Training, Advisory Bureau for Higher Studies, Entrepreneur Development Cell, Guest Lectures, Foreign Language Classes and Sports.

=== Centre for Nanoscience and Nanotechnology ===
The Centre for Nanoscience and Nanotechnology was established in January 2006. It was upgraded in 2011 with research instrumentation facilities like FE-SEM, XRD, E-beam, DC thermal, RF, AFM, PLD, etc. The centre has a team of scientists working in the fields of Material Sciences, Thin Film Coatings, Nanofabrications, Environmental Nanotechnology, Concrete Research, Marine Biotechnology, Nanobiotechnology and Molecular Medicine, as well as Nanomedical Sciences, Drug Discovery and Polymer Chemistry.

=== Centre for Advanced Studies ===
The centre for advanced studies was established in 2013 to carry out specialized studies in the fields of genetic research, metallurgy, immunology, and robotics. The institution has developed algorithms that are now used in the university's data labs, computer-integrated security systems and student management logs.

=== Aeronautical Hangars ===
Sathyabama has three large aeronautical hangars that are a part of the institution's programmes in aviation research. Constructed in 2008, these hangars are used to construct model aircraft, wind turbines, wind-flow panels, and other components of aeronautical engineering. The Sathyabama-ISRO space satellite which was launched in 2016 was also manufactured here.

=== Central Library ===
The university has a central library, named after its founder Dr. Jeppiaar. The library was constructed in 2001, and currently has more than 313,000 books. It has subscription services to major publishers such as the AICTE, ASME, ASCE, ACM Digital Library, and IEEE engineering journals. Apart from this, the library also has monthly subscriptions to more than 130 journals and 100 magazines. The library is also connected to the staff internet service-link of the university.

=== Sathyabama TBI (Technology Business Incubator) ===
In 2015, the Technology Business Incubator (TBI) was established with the help of National Science & Technology Entrepreneurship Development Board (NSTEDB), a government agency. The purpose of the center is to create innovations and developments in the entrepreneurship and business fields, and assist students in launching their own startups. The center also carries out research in the employment sector, by analysing current market trends and future potentials.

=== Centre for Non-Destructive Testing and Evaluation ===
In 2019, the Centre for Non-Destructive Testing and Evaluation was established at the research park in the university. It provides students with workshops, seminars and laboratory training in the fields of testing and evaluation of engineering sectors. The programmes are supervised by the AICTE, a government body. The center is equipped to carry out experiments and trials in ultrasonic testing, thermography, radiography, and other similar areas.

=== DST-FIST Cloud Computing ===
The Cloud Computing Center was launched to design, develop and integrate computer technology in the university's main server lines. It contains portals and computer laboratories that help deploy and maintain Cloud infrastructure.

=== Makerspace Lab ===
The Makerspace Lab is one of the newest research facilities at the university, and was established to help assist students in the engineering department to gain skills in the developments related to manufacturing industries. The center uses equipment such as the "Fablab" which has F370, 5 Makerbot+ and 3 Makerbot Z18 technology.

=== Centre for Drug Discovery and Development ===
The Centre for Drug Discovery and Development (CDDD), which consists of teams specializing in bioactivity, biological chemistry, genomics, and bioprospecting, was established in 2013 to carry out research into the development of New Chemical Entities (NCE) that can be used to eliminate diseases such as HIV and tuberculosis.

=== Centre for Laboratory Animal Technology and Research ===
The center is accredited by the Committee for the Purpose of Control and Supervision of Experimentation on Animals (CPCSEA) and is GLP-compliant, and was launched to carry out experimental research on common animals such as rodents and study their behavior and response to external factors. It has advanced facilities that allow for animal research within the guidelines of the CPCSEA.

=== Centre for Molecular and Nanomedical Sciences ===
The Centre for Molecular and Nanomedical Sciences (CMNS) was established as a result of the Nanomedicine and Drug Discovery Lab in 2012, and then expanded into the Molecular and Nanomedicine Research Unit in 2014. It carries out investigations into matters related to biology, organic biology, stem cell studies, cancer and regeneration biology, and other fields. The center collaborates with government research organizations as well.

=== Centre for Ocean Research ===
The Centre for Ocean Research (COR) was established in the year 2007 as a collaboration between the National Institute of Ocean Technology (NIOT) and the university. It specializes in ocean studies and marine technology, and is assisted by the Marine Biotechnological Studies by the Ministry of Earth Sciences (MoES), a government agency. It also organizes projects with the government departments to carry out research into earth sciences.

=== Centre for Climate Change Studies ===
The Centre for Climate Change Studies (CCS) was founded in the year 2011 with the aim of researching the environmental impact of weather and climate changes, and the conservation of sensitive eco-zones such as forest, coral reefs and biospheres. It works together with the Sathyabama Marine Research Station (SMRS) and submits it research findings to the International Research Centre (IRC) at the university.

=== Centre for Remote Sensing and Geoinformatics ===
The Centre for Remote Sensing and Geoinformatics (CRSG) was founded in 2004 and is supported by ISRO. The purpose of the undertaking is to use Indian satellites to research fields like agriculture, urban studies, and aerial photogrammetry. It also organizes training seminars for students at ISRO laboratories.

=== Centre of Excellence for Energy Research ===
The Centre of Excellence for Energy Research (CEER) is funded by the Ministry of Human Resource Development (MHRD), a government body that specializes in education and skill development. It was launched in 2014 and the facility carries out research in solar panels, photovoltaic cells and supercapacitors.

=== Centre for Earth and Atmospheric Sciences ===
The Centre for Earth and Atmospheric Sciences (CEAS) was established in 2010 with the assistance of Indira Gandhi Atomic Research (IGCAR) and India Meteorological Department (IMD). It features meteorological laboratories and observation towers, and carries out studies in the fields of atmospheric sciences. It researches both manmade and natural disasters, and is equipped to carry out studies in the remote sensing and GIS fields.

== Controversies ==
Sathyabama University was known for its strict enforcement of moral rules and discipline among its students in the past, including gender segregation, and this has been met with criticism from both students and analysts. There have been several instances of student protests and large-scale violence due to the strict operating protocols of the university.

== Alumni ==
- Atlee Kumar, Tamil film director, screenwriter and film producer
- Atharvaa Murali, Tamil movie actor
- Vivek, Tamil movie actor and comedian
- Gayathri Reddy, Tamil film actress and model
- Ishari K. Ganesh, Founder and chairman of Vels University
- Hemant Katare, Congress MLA and politician
- Rose Venkatesan, Tamil talk show host
- Pradeep John, Tamil weatherman and host
- Mohammed Asif, professional sailor and space propulsion researcher
