= Theodore Cooke =

Theodore Cooke, CIE, (born Tramore, County Waterford, January 6, 1836; died Richmond, London, November 5, 1910) was an Anglo-Irish engineer, educator, and botanist active in India. He is known for his leadership of the College of Engineering, Pune from 1865 to 1893 and his multi-volume Flora of the Presidency of Bombay (1901–1908).

== Career ==
Cooke was the son of Rev. John Cooke, Rector of Ardfinnan, County Tipperary and was educated at Trinity College Dublin, graduating in 1859 in arts and engineering. He went to India in 1860 as an engineer for the Bombay, Baroda and Central India Railway. He erected the Vasai Creek Railway Bridge, completed in 1864. In 1865 he was made the director of the Civil Engineering College, later the College of Science, at Poona, where he remained for 28 years. During that time the college added programs in licensed and civil engineering, forestry, and agriculture and became affiliated with the University of Bombay. In 1893 he left India for England.

He was made a member of the Order of the Indian Empire in 1891 for his administrative work.

== Botany ==
Cooke had always taken an interest in botany during his time in India and in 1891 he was placed in charge of the western division of the Botanical Survey of India. While in that position he began to plan a "Flora of the Presidency of Bombay", but difficulties prevented its production at that time. After Cooke left India and settled in England, he was appointed to a position at the Imperial Institute which occupied his time. However, eventually he settled at Kew near the botanical gardens and began the project, which was published in sections from 1901 to 1908, ultimately collected into two volumes. This flora proved so useful for Indian botany that after independence it was reprinted by the reconstituted Botanical Survey of India in 1958 and again in 1967.

The standard author abbreviation T.Cooke is used to indicate this person as the author when citing a botanical name.

== Family ==
Cooke married Ellen Arabella Curtis in 1867; they had two children, John Vernon Cooke (b. 1869) and May Alfreda Cooke (1870–1935).
