= Pradeep John =

Weather blogger

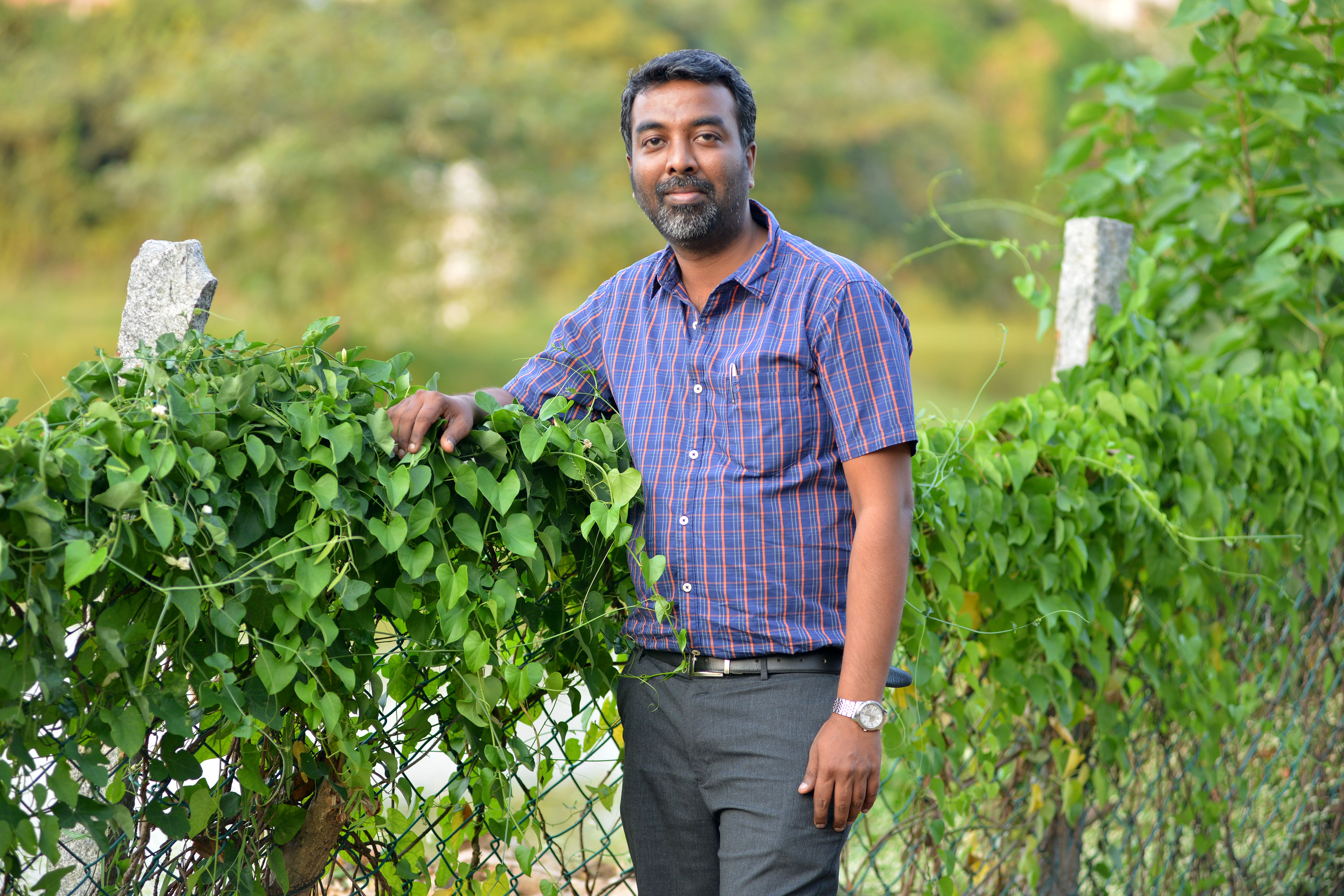

Personal details
- Born: 6 July 1982 (age 44) Melpuram, Pacode, Kanyakumari District
- Education: Sathyabama University (B.E); Madras University (M.B.A)
- Website: https://www.tamilnaduweatherman.in/

Pradeep John, popularly known as the Tamil Nadu Weatherman, is an Indian amateur weather forecasting enthusiast and blogger from Tamil Nadu. People of Chennai follow his forecasts more closely than those published by the India Meteorological Department during the monsoon season. He began blogging about weather and rainfall in 2008. In 2014, he started publishing on social media. His social media popularity increased after his accurate predictions during the 2015 Chennai floods.

== Early life ==
Pradeep John was born in Kanyakumari district in South Tamil Nadu and lives in Chennai. His interest in weather began at age 12. He did his schooling at SBOA Matriculation School and graduated with a B.E. in Computer science and Engineering from Sathyabama University. He also holds an MBA in finance from Madras University. Pradeep John is married to Hannah Shalini; the couple have a daughter.

== Career ==
In 2008, Pradeep John joined India Infolines as a relationship manager. Currently, he works as a Senior manager at Tamil Nadu Urban Infrastructure Financial Services Limited (TNUIFSL).

== Awards and honours ==
- 2018: Inspirational Achiever Award
- 2019: Inspirational Role Model Award
