= Nallathai Naadu Kekum =

- Directed by: Jeppiaar; M. Karnan
- Written by: Jeppiaar
- Produced by: Jeppiaar
- Starring: M. G. Ramachandran; Jeppiaar; Padmapriya; Gautami; Rekha
- Cinematography: Hemachandran
- Edited by: Devarajan
- Music by: Shankar–Ganesh
- Production company: Jeppiaar Pictures
- Release date: 10 May 1991
- Country: India
- Language: Tamil

Nallathai Naadu Kekum (transl. The country will listen to the good) is a 1991 Indian Tamil language film starring and directed by Jeppiaar. It stars M. G. Ramachandran via archive footage. The film was released on 10 May 1991.

== Plot ==
The film's narrative operates on two parallel timelines, integrating archival footage of the late actor and former Chief Minister of Tamil Nadu, M. G. Ramachandran (MGR), from his unfinished 1977 film of the same name into a new story set in 1991.

The contemporary storyline, set in the early 1990s, focuses on Raja (Jeppiaar), a principled and socially conscious young man. His town is controlled by a ruthless industrialist (played by Jai Ganesh), who exploits the local population through land grabbing and intimidation. Raja is a fervent admirer of Jeeva (played by MGR in the archival footage), a deceased journalist and activist who was once a legendary champion of the poor.

When the industrialist's actions directly harm the community, Raja decides to stand up against him, modelling his methods on the stories he has heard about his idol, Jeeva. The film frequently uses the archival footage as extended flashbacks, triggered by Raja's current predicaments. These sequences depict Jeeva fighting against corruption, defending villagers from goons, and using his influence to bring about social justice.

As Raja begins to thwart the industrialist's schemes, he gains the support of the townspeople, including his love interest, Radha (Gautami). The industrialist retaliates by attempting to frame Raja for crimes and threatening his loved ones. In each moment of crisis, Raja recalls a similar challenge that Jeeva faced and overcame, giving him the inspiration and tactical knowledge to counter the villain's moves. The film also features a supporting role by Rekha and a parallel comedy track involving the duo Goundamani and Senthil.

In the climax, the industrialist initiates a final, destructive plan to secure his wealth. Raja, fully embodying Jeeva's spirit of righteous fury, confronts the villain in a direct showdown. He successfully defeats the industrialist and his henchmen, exposing his crimes and handing him over to the law. The film concludes with peace restored to the town, as Raja is hailed as a true successor to Jeeva's legacy.

== Cast ==
- M. G. Ramachandran as Jeeva (Archive Footage)
- S. V. Subbaiah as Police Inspector Sathiyakeerthi (Archive Footage)
- Jeppiaar as Raja
- Padmapriya as Mala (Lawyer), Police Inspector Sathiyakeerthi's daughter (Archive Footage)
- Jai Ganesh as Maruthakudi Manikkam
- Gautami as Seetha, Maruthakudi Manikkam's daughter
- Rekha as Radha, DSP Prabhakaran's sister
- Rajesh as DSP Prabhakaran
- Senthil as Palani, a fraudulent voter
- Oru Viral Krishna Rao as Panchayat Man
- Goundamani as A police officer who disguises himself as a ghost
- Haja Sheriff as Ramu's friend

== Production ==
M. G. Ramachandran's unfinished film in 1977 Nallathai Naadu Kekum directed by M. Karnan was incorporated into a totally new plot, resulting into this film. The M. G. Ramachandran footage includes few scenes. When this film went out, Ramachandran had died, for a little less than four years.

== Soundtrack ==
Music was composed by Shankar–Ganesh.

All lyrics are written by Vaali.

Track listing
| No. | Title | Singer(s) | Length |
|---|---|---|---|
| 1. | "Tamizh Therile" | Mano | 4.11 |
| 2. | "Raja Kaiyil Rajangam Nirantharam" | S. P. Balasubrahmanyam & chorus | 4.52 |
| 3. | "Raavellaam Un Ngyaabagam" | K. S. Chitra | 4.44 |
| 4. | "Nallathai Naadu Ketkum" | S. P. Balasubrahmanyam, Prabakar, Radhika | 4.12 |
| 5. | "Machchaanai Oram Kattu" | S. P. Sailaja & chorus | 4.56 |
| 6. | "Maavaatta Naanum Varattaa" | Malaysia Vasudevan & chorus | 4.39 |
| 7. | "Lailaa...Lailaa..." | S. P. Balasubrahmanyam & chorus | 4.24 |
