= Maritime Monitoring and Messaging Microsatellite =

Canadian communications technology demonstration satellite

- Names: M3MSat
- Mission type: Telecommunications technology demonstration
- Operator: Canadian Space Agency
- COSPAR ID: 2016-040G
- SATCAT no.: 41605
- Mission duration: 2 years

Spacecraft properties
- Manufacturer: Honeywell, Canadian Space Agency

Start of mission
- Launch date: 03:56, June 22, 2016 (UTC)
- Rocket: PSLV XL flight PSLV-C34
- Launch site: Satish Dhawan Space Centre

Orbital parameters
- Reference system: Geocentric
- Perigee altitude: 650 km (400 mi)
- Apogee altitude: 650 km (400 mi)
- Period: 10 orbits per day

The Maritime Monitoring and Messaging Microsatellite (M3MSat) is a tele-detection satellite developed by the Canadian Space Agency and launched in 2016. Its mission is to demonstrate and test the technology to assess the utility of having in space an Automatic Identification System (AIS) for reading signals from vessels to better manage marine transport in Canadian waters. The system will be supported by an instrument called a Low Data Rate Service (LDRS), which transmits AIS messages to ground sensors.

== Objectives ==
The M3MSat microsatellite will be used to receive and locate digital signals transmitted by vessels. This data will be sent to ground stations to then be relayed to operators for Defence Research and Development Canada (DRDC). This will make it possible to identify and record marine traffic, know vessels' direction, cruising speed, and ensure that they navigate legally and safely in Canadian waters.

Canada's Department of National Defence has granted a licence to exactEarth to commercialize the AIS data collected from M3MSat and integrate it with the data collected from the rest of the exactEarth constellation.

== Payload ==
M3MSat is a tele-detection satellite, and its mission is to demonstrate and test the technology of three instruments:

- Automatic Identification System (AIS) — will make it possible to detect signals from ships and thus know the locations of ships travelling in Canadian waters.
- Low Data Rate Service (LDRS), which will receive low-speed AIS data from boats in Canadian waters and retransmit that data to control centers located in the east and west of the country, ensuring coordination and retransmission of information collected on marine traffic. This will enable the collection of data on marine traffic in remote areas where there is no data streaming infrastructure.
- Dielectric Deep Charge Monitor (DDCM), accumulated electrostatic charge in satellites' dielectric (non-conductive) material and gain insight on their level of functionality. This information will help extend the lifetime of Earth-orbiting satellites.
