= Shailesh J. Mehta School of Management =

Business school in India

Shailesh J. Mehta School of Management, IIT, Bombay
- Type: Public
- Established: 1995
- Location: Powai, Mumbai, Maharashtra, India; 19°7′58″N 72°54′55.27″E
- Campus: Urban,
- Head: S.V.D. Nageswara Rao
- Website: www.som.iitb.ac.in

Shailesh J. Mehta School of Management (popularly known as SJMSOM or simply SOM) is a public business school and part of Indian Institute of Technology Bombay. SJMSOM was established in 1995. In 2000, the school was renamed to Shailesh J. Mehta School of Management, in honor of Dr. Shailesh J. Mehta who is a Mechanical Engineer graduate of IIT Bombay The director of school is S.V.D. Nageswara Rao.

== Academics ==
SJMSOM conducts education and research in leadership, economics, marketing, entrepreneurship, organizational behavior, technology management, operations, strategy and other areas. The school offers a full-time degree course (Master of Business Administration), doctoral course and Management Development Programs (MDP) for company representatives. The school offers short-term programs in areas of management for the faculty of technical and management institutions during summer and winter seasons. Shailesh J. Mehta School of Management, IIT Bombay and Olin Business School, Washington University in St. Louis jointly offers Executive MBA (EMBA) degree program for working professionals. Admissions are through CAT followed by group discussions and personal interview.

== Rankings ==
Institute rankings

Business/Management – India
- NIRF (2022): 11

The school was ranked 10 in India in the National Institutional Ranking Framework Management ranking in 2024.

== Events ==
Avenues is the annual international business school festival of IIT Bombay. Avenues is the annual flagship event of the Shailesh J. Mehta School of Management (SJMSOM) at the Indian Institute of Technology Bombay (IIT Bombay). Established in 1995. Avenues attracts participants from top business and engineering schools across India and internationally.

Continuum is the rolling seminar series at the school that covers recent management trends and brings together personalities of the corporate and academic world. They are held in five fields: Systems, Finance, Human Resources, Marketing and Operations.
