= Tata Projects =

Indian engineering, procurement and construction company

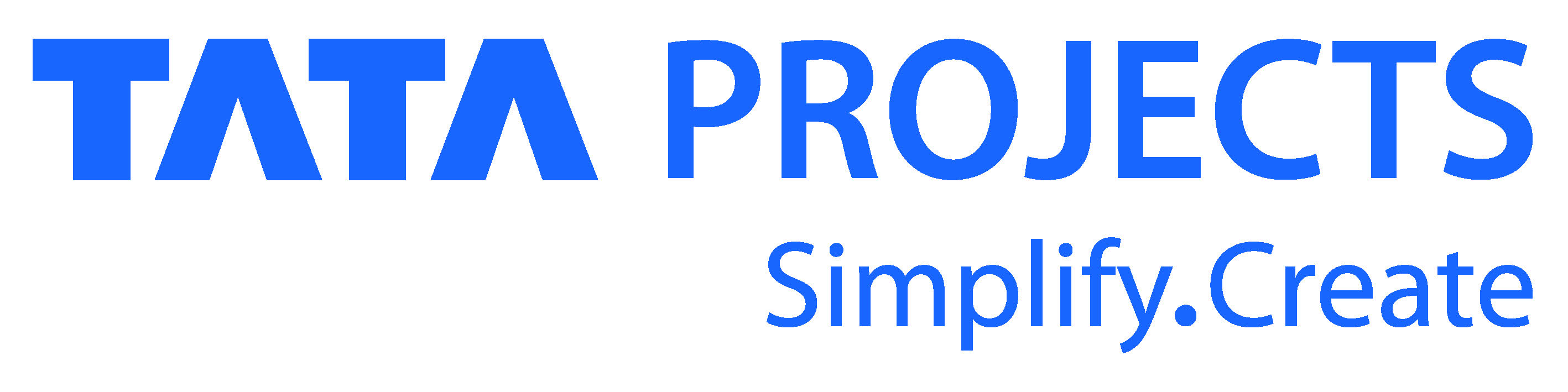
- Type: Unlisted public
- Industry: Engineering, procurement, and construction
- Founded: 1979; 47 years ago
- Founder: J. R. D. Tata
- Headquarters: Mumbai, Maharashtra, India
- Area served: Worldwide
- Key people: Praveer Sinha (Chairman); Sukumar Hebbar (MD & CEO)
- Revenue: ▼₹17,565 crore (US$1.9 billion) (2025)
- Net income: ▲₹711 crore (US$76 million) (2025)
- Total assets: ▲₹24,874 crore (US$2.7 billion) (2025)
- Total equity: ▲₹3,548 crore (US$380 million) (2025)
- Number of employees: 6,300+
- Parent: Tata Group
- Website: Official website

Tata Projects is an Indian engineering, procurement and construction company. It is a part of Tata Group.

== History ==
The company was founded in 1979 by J. R. D. Tata to create a complete consortium to take on engineering, procurement, and construction projects. It specializes in industrial and urban infrastructure projects and is currently headquartered in Powai, Mumbai.

== Operations ==
=== Advanced technology facilities ===
The company undertakes construction projects for data centers, manufacturing units, and life science facilities. It also constructed India's first Semiconductor Manufacturing Facility for Micron at Sanand, Gujarat. It secured the Nitric Acid Expansion Project at Deepak Fertilisers and Petrochemicals Corporation Ltd.'s (DFPCL) Dahej plant in Gujarat.

=== Space and nuclear ===
Tata Projects was engaged in the construction of structures for the Nuclear Power Corporation of India Limited (NPCIL), Bhabha Atomic Research Centre (BARC), and Indian Space Research Organisation (ISRO). The Nuclear Power Corporation of India (NPCIL) awarded the company a $321 million contract, marking its third contract in the nuclear power industry. It was also responsible for building the Trisonic Wind Tunnel at the Vikram Sarabhai Space Centre (VSSC) in Thiruvananthapuram, Kerala.

=== Power sector ===
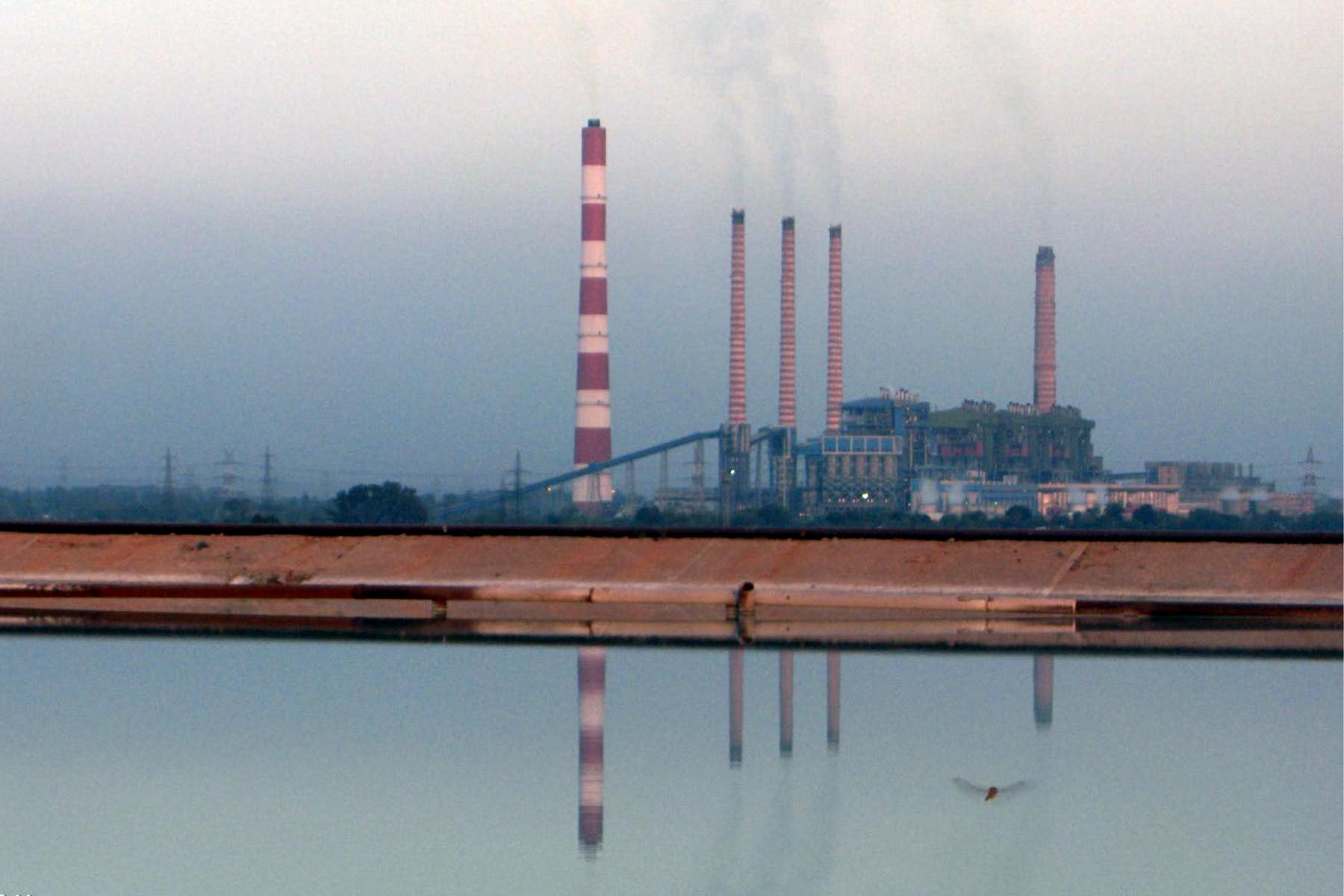
NTPC Ramagundam Project

Tata Projects supports gas-based combined-cycle power plants and balance of plants on an EPC basis for coal-based power plants that are operating at supercritical and subcritical temperatures. Tata Projects built 400 KV double circuit transmission lines in the northern parts of Bangladesh. The group also executes transmission line projects of 500kV in Thailand.

=== Transportation ===
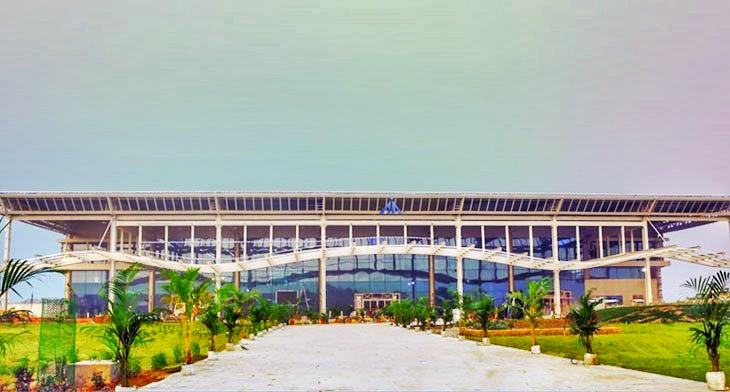
Prayagraj Airport Terminal

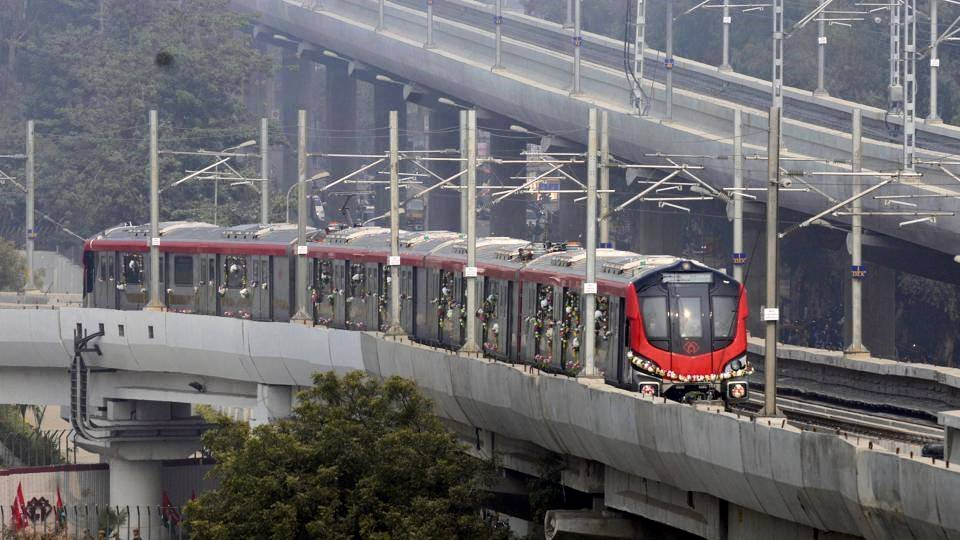
Lucknow Metro

Tata Projects focuses on niche road projects, including expressways and railway infrastructure, such as mass rapid transit systems and automobile sectors.

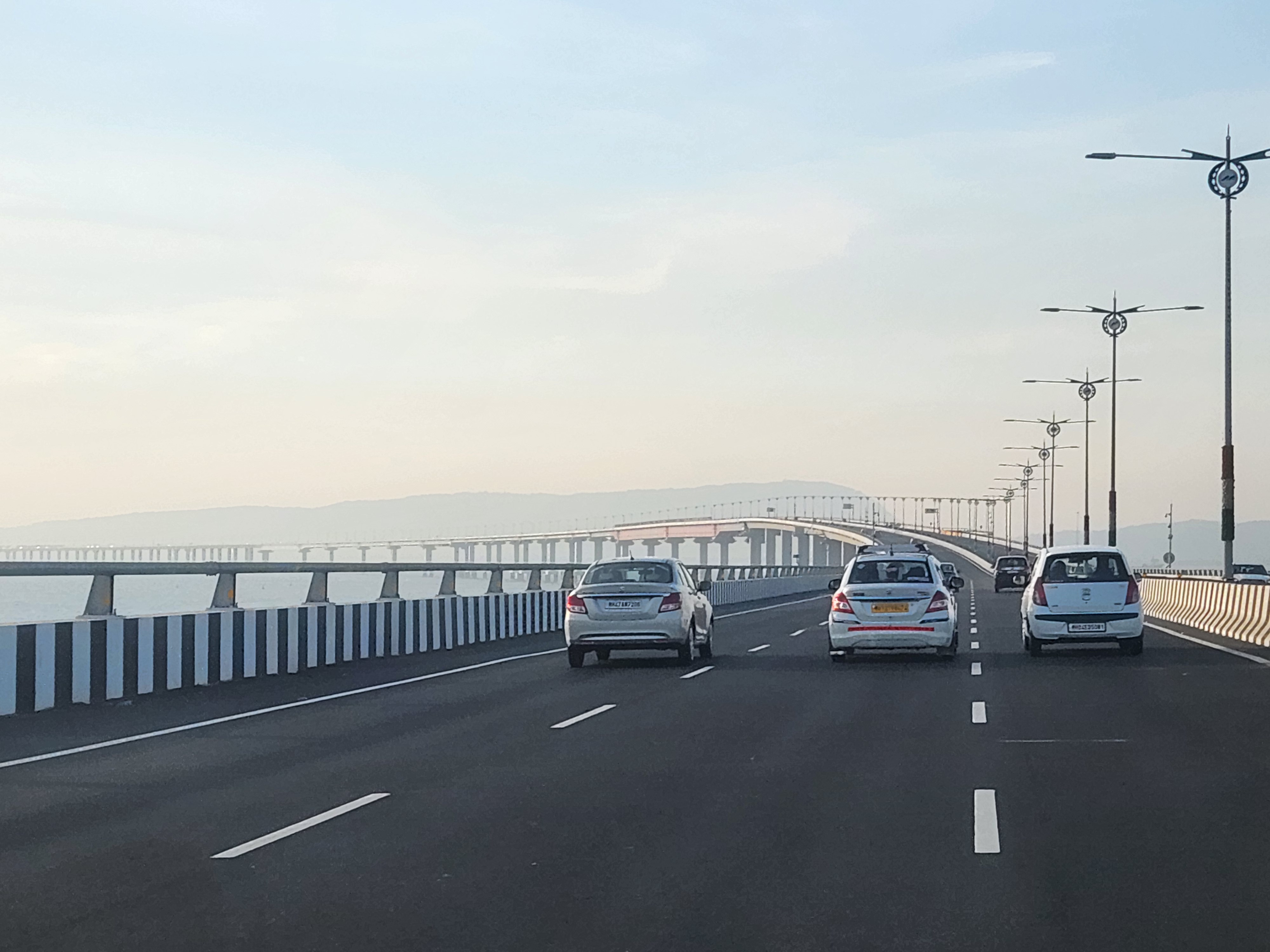
Mumbai Trans Harbour Link

The company carries out transport and urban development projects for Mumbai Metropolitan Region Development Authority (MMRDA). The new terminal at Prayagraj Airport was constructed in 11 months. Tata Projects is building the Dedicated Freight Corridor Project, focusing on both the Eastern Dedicated Freight Corridor and Western Dedicated Freight Corridor project. The company is also undertaking various underground and elevated metro projects in cities such as Lucknow, Mumbai, Pune, Delhi, Ahmedabad, and Chennai in India as well as Dhaka in Bangladesh. The Mumbai Trans Harbour Link, a 21.8 km road bridge, is India's longest sea bridge, connecting Mumbai with Navi Mumbai. Additionally, Tata Projects is working on the Noida International Airport, which is planned to be the largest airport in India and Asia, focusing on the development of the passenger terminal, runway, and other airport infrastructure.

=== Urban infrastructure ===
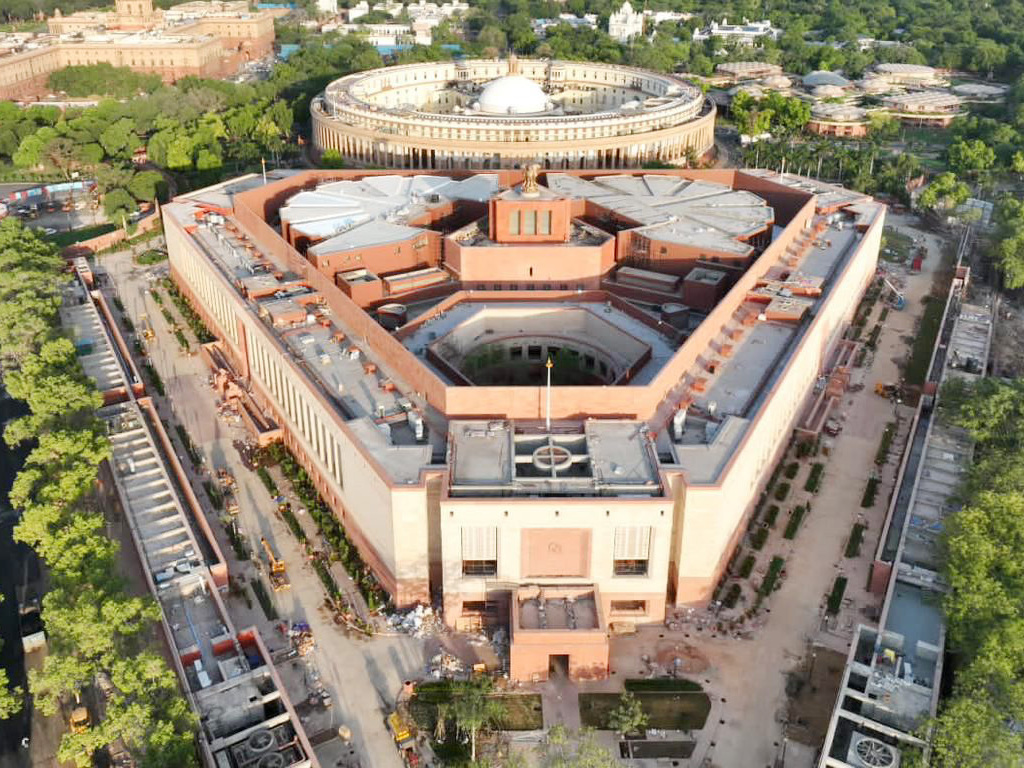
New Parliament Building, Delhi

In 1990, Tata Projects constructed a hotel in Tashkent, Uzbekistan. Within India, the Bharat Net Project in Chhattisgarh involves laying an optical fibre network.

The construction of the new Ginger hotel in Santacruz, Mumbai, was managed by an all-women engineering team. They worked on the National Maritime Heritage Complex project. The redevelopment of the BDD Chawls in Mumbai focuses on urban renewal.

It was involved in the Shree Mandira Parikrama Prakalpa in Puri. Tata Projects built New Parliament House, New Delhi.

=== Oil and gas ===
In 2020, the company received orders of Rs 6,000 crore in oil and gas refinery industry from two state-run businesses. Tata Projects built the ONGC Bokaro project in Jharkhand and the U-Field project by ONGC Kakinada in the Deepwater Krishna-Godavari basin.

=== Metals and minerals ===
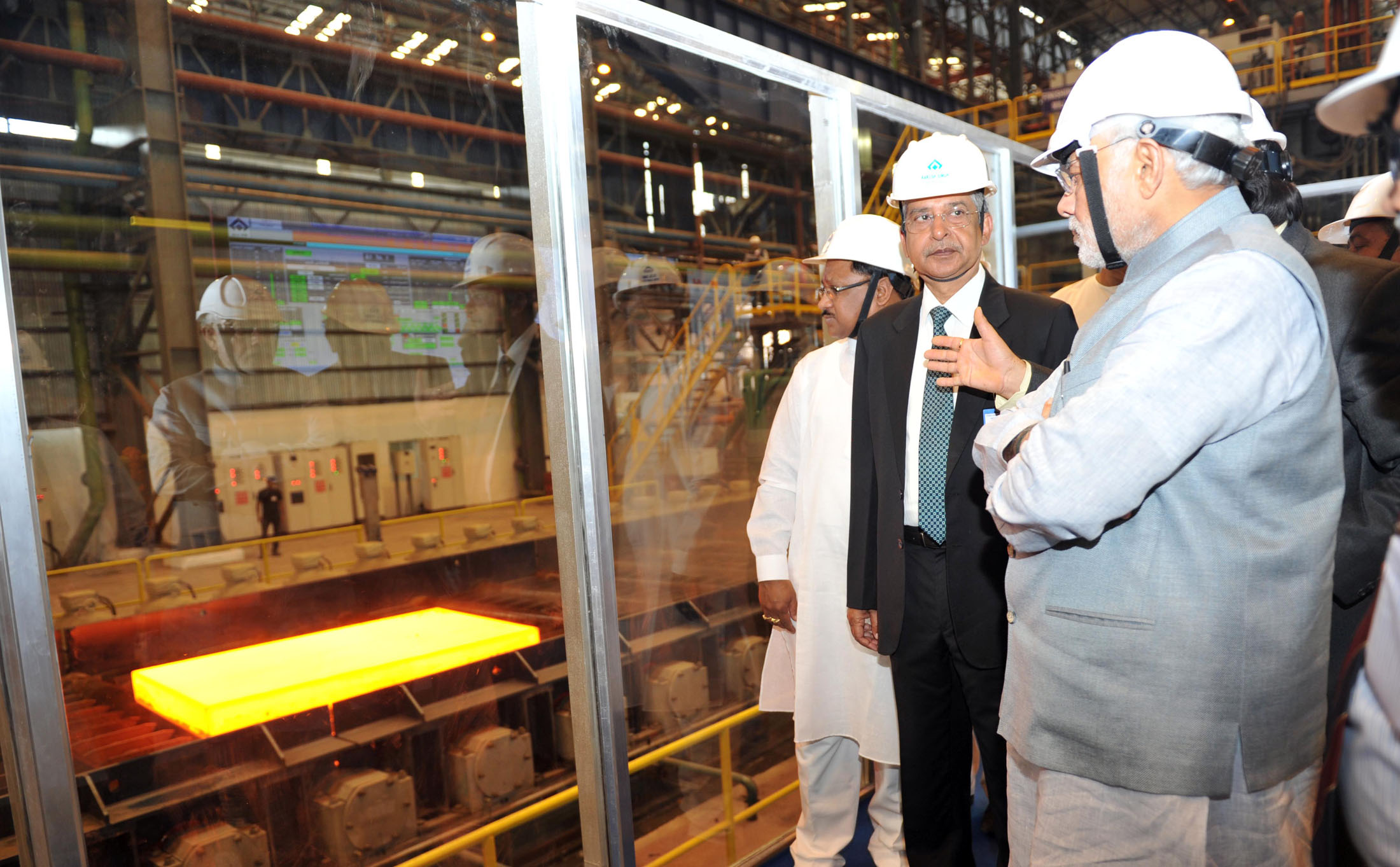
The Prime Minister, Shri Narendra Modi visiting the Rourkela Steel Plant

Tata Projects operates iron and steel projects in different countries, building beneficiation plants, sinter plants, pellet plants, blast furnaces, casters and rolling mills on an EPC basis. They also built Rourkela Steel Plant in Odisha.

=== Water ===
In 2017, Tata Projects and Watergen of Israel began initiatives aimed at extracting drinking water from the atmosphere. In Connaught Place in New Delhi, Watergen installed a GEN-350G pilot. The Dravyavati River Rejuvenation Project involved revitalizing the Dravyavati River by recharging it with treated sewage water. The project included landscaping the slopes on both banks and creating parks and social spaces.
