= History of space in Africa =

History of space initiatives in Africa

- Date: 1947-present
- Location: Africa
- Type: Space History
- Participants: African countries

The history of space in Africa is the history of space activity by or sent from Africa.

Africa has had since 1947 launch sites, with the first independent space programs having been set up early into the Space Age, and African countries participating within the United Nations in developing international space law. Since 1999 African countries have sent satellites into orbit (SUNSAT), had one astronaut in orbit (Mark Shuttleworth) and have founded national space agencies, including an all African African Space Agency of the African Union.

== Overview ==
The domain of international space politics gained significant traction during the Cold War. This was largely fuelled by the ongoing space race between the US and the USSR. At this time in history, space exploration was an endeavour largely restricted to the global superpowers and seemed out of reach for many smaller, developing, nations to actively participate in. Subsequently, public concerns for the cost of research and development into novel space technologies did not receive sufficient policy and academic attention in Africa. As the Cold War reached its conclusion, political power began to diffuse across the world, and this led to many smaller nation states developing national and regional space capabilities. In the context of Africa, Nigeria, Algeria, Egypt and South Africa were the front-runners in terms of investments into space-related research and development.

Over the past few decades, Africa has witnessed a significant increase in investments into space-related R&D, ranging from satellites to ground facilities; including astronomical observatories, ground stations for remote sensing and communications, and rocket launch capabilities. At present, 20 countries across the African continent have established a national space programme, either in the form of a research institution or a national space agency. Many of these nations, including, Algeria, Angola, Egypt, Ethiopia, Ghana, Kenya, Morocco, Nigeria, Rwanda, South Africa and Sudan have already launched satellites into orbit, while others like Botswana and Uganda, to name a few, are committed to developing and launching their own satellites within the next few years. Sophisticated telescopes, for astronomical observations, conducted across the electromagnetic spectrum, can be found on all four corners of the African continent. Ground stations for satellite tracking, remote sensing, and more recently, for space weather forecasting, have also been established throughout the region. With regards to launch capabilities, the Luigi Broglio Space Center (LBSC) near Malindi, Kenya and the Denel Overberg Test Range in South Africa are two notable examples of orbital launch facilities located in Africa.

As space programmes are typically a capital and resource intensive endeavour, many of these developing African nations have been criticized by the public for heavily investing into the development of space infrastructure. The most cited argument against investment into space capabilities revolves around the fact that resources should be allocated to higher priority areas, addressing more immediate issues on the ground, like; poverty, inequality, armed conflicts, national security concerns, political instability, and dependence on foreign aid in the region. This argument is countered by the fact that space technology, particularly in the area of Earth Observation and remote sensing, has made a substantial contribution towards the achievement of the United Nations Sustainable Development Goals (SDGs), highlighted in Agenda 2030.

According to the United Nations:

"Utilising space contributes positively to a range of policy areas, including climate and weather monitoring, access to health care and education, water management, efficiency in transportation and agriculture, peacekeeping, security and humanitarian assistance."

In Africa, access to satellite imagery data and broadband has revolutionized agriculture, helped mitigate illegal mining, and saved many lives from the impact of natural disasters, like floods and the aftermath of volcanic eruptions. These positive socio-economic impacts resulting from space technologies is the primary catalyst motivating smaller nations to set up their own space programmes. Consequently, through these investments in space infrastructure, Africa countries have made significant strides in research and innovations in the fields of space science and astrophysics, high performance computing, software development, satellite engineering, geodesy, urban planning, and environmental science.

== Regional overview of the African space economy ==
Prior to 2010, much of Africa's involvement in the global space sector was mainly in the areas of astronomy, space science, and around assisting foreign space missions with tracking and telemetry, through ground stations with antennas strategically located across the continent. Since then, many African countries have entered the space fora, through the establishment of their respective national space agencies/institutions. Coincidently, the nations with existing space capabilities continued to develop satellite programmes and expand their space budgets. By 2020, South Africa, Algeria, Nigeria, Egypt and Angola were the top 5 African countries in terms of allocated space budgets, with a combined budget of approximately US$393 million (see Figure 1).

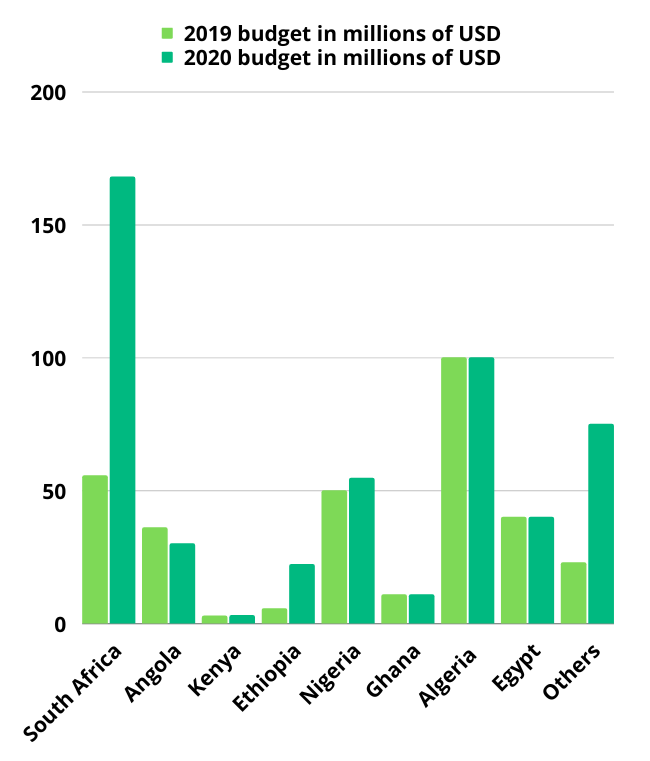
Figure 1. Estimated space budgets for African countries in 2019 and 2020. Image created using data obtained from Space in Africa's 2021 Global Space Budgets- A Country-Level Analysis https://spaceinafrica.com/reports/

=== The African upstream/space manufacturing sector ===
Not much investment has been made in the area of launch vehicles and orbital launch facilities due to much of the focus on the continent being on the downstream segment, exploiting space technologies for various applications- particularly for Earth Observation, remote sensing and satellite communications. However, there are existing launch facilities scattered across the continent. The Denel Overberg Test Range, located on the south coast of South Africa and the Luigi Broglio Space Centre (LBSC), owned by the Italian Space Agency and located in Malindi, Kenya are two notable orbital launch facilities on the continent. Furthermore, the 1967 Evian Agreement, allowed Algeria to inherit a French-owned rocket launch facility in Hammaguir. There are growing efforts to develop launch capabilities through rocket and missile programmes throughout the region. However, as of September 2022, all African satellites have been launched from foreign launch pads in countries like Russia, China, Kazakhstan, France and the US to name a few.

The first African owned satellite, NileSat 101, was launched by the European Space Agency (ESA) from Kourou, French Guiana on 28 April 1998. The associated Egyptian telecommunications company NileSat then went on to launch NileSat 102, NileSat 103, NileSat 201 and most recently NileSat 301, all of which operate as geosynchronous communications satellites. In terms of the number of satellites launched, South Africa leads the way with a total of 11 as of 2022, closely followed by Egypt (10), Algeria (6), Nigeria (6), Morocco (3) and Ethiopia (2). Tunisia, Sudan, Rwanda, Kenya, Mauritius, Ghana and Angola have also launched at least one satellite into orbit.

In addition to these, there are three multilateral Geosynchronous Earth Orbit (GEO) telecommunications satellite projects. Two of which were launched as part of an agreement with the Regional African Satellite Communication Organization (RASCOM)- an organisation that represents the interests of 44 telecommunications operators. The other is the New Dawn satellite, a joint venture between IntelSat and South African investors, which aims to extend Africa's communications infrastructure. Moreover, the African Resource Management Constellation (ARMC) is an intra-Africa collaboration between Kenya, Algeria, Nigeria and South Africa. The project was initiated in 2004 and revived in 2018, with the goal of launching a constellation of four Earth Observation satellites (each country contributing a single satellite) and sharing the data collected from the satellites, to assess and monitor the continent's natural resources.

Although majority of the above-mentioned satellites are owned and operated by African countries, many of the satellites are built through collaborations with foreign entities. Algeria and Nigeria have both collaborated with Surrey Satellite Technology Limited (SSTL) in the UK as part of technology transfer agreements (SSTL provided training to Nigerian engineers which they then applied to the development of Nigeriasat-1 and 2). Egypt has also partnered with Russia for the development of EgyptSat-A, which was launched on 21 February 2019, to conduct land observation and disaster monitoring. In Ghana, the All-Nations University Space Systems and Technology Lab (ANU-SSTL) collaborated with the Kyushu Institute of Technology in Japan on the GhanSat-1 Cubesat project, which was launched as the nation's first satellite on 7 July 2017. Rwanda has partnered with the University of Tokyo in Japan in their efforts to build and launch their country's first satellite. The 3U CubeSat named RWASAT-1 was launched on 24 September 2019. In South Africa, Stellenbosch University and the Cape Peninsula University of Technology (CPUT) have active satellite engineering programmes and were responsible for the local production and operation of Sunsat, Sumbandila Satellite, and the ZaCube-1 respectively.

In terms of ground-based observatories, the Hermanus Magnetic Observatory (HMO) was established as a recording station in the Cape of Good Hope (South Africa) in 1841. HMO provides important data relating to the geomagnetic field and is used to study the near-earth space environment. South Africa is also home to the Southern African Large Telescope (SALT)- the largest single optical telescope in the southern hemisphere. Moreover, South Africa also hosts the Hartebeeshoek Radio Astronomy Observatory (HartRao) and is currently joint host with Australia for the Square Kilometre Array Telescope (SKA), when completed will be the largest radio telescope on Earth, with a collecting area of over a square kilometre (one million square metres). Although the SKA will be located in the Karoo desert of South Africa, the project will also leverage extended facilities across the continent located in Botswana, Ghana, Kenya, Madagascar, Mauritius, Mozambique, Namibia, and Zambia. The most prominent of these extended facilities is located in Kutunse, Ghana and houses a 32m radio astronomy telescope. Other notable astronomical observatories on the continent include the Entoto Observatory and Research Centre, located on the 3,200-metre summit of Mount Entoto in Ethiopia and the 1.9m optical telescope at the Kottamia observatory, located about 80 km from the centre of Cairo.

=== Table of African upstream/space manufacturing sector activities ===
The following table provides a summary of the upstream activities in each African country, including ground stations, launch systems and satellites, across the continent. Note that this list may not be exhaustive.
Country	Designated Space Agency/Institution (year of establishment)	Ground Facilities	Satellites (year of launch)
Algeria	Agence Spatiale Algérienne- ASAL (2002)	Rocket launch site in Hammaguir; Sounding rocket launch site in Béchar; Satellite ground station in Arzew	ALSAT-1 (2002); ALSAT-2A (2010); ALSAT-1B (2016); ALSAT-2B (2016); ALSAT-1N (2016); ALCOMSAT-1 (2017)
Angola	Gabinete de Gestao do Programa Espacial Nacional - GGPEN (2013)		ANGOSAT-1 (2017); ANGOSAT-2 (2022)
Egypt	Egypt Space Agency- EgSA - (2018)	Kottamia observatory- 1.9 meter (m) telescope; Nilesat Satellite Operation Centre in Al-Hammam; Nilesat Satellite Operation Centre in 6th October City	NILESAT 101 (1998); NILESAT 102 (2003); NILESAT 103 (2005); EGYPTSAT-1 (2007); NILESAT-201 (2010); EGYPTSAT-2 (2014); EGYPTSAT A (2019); NARSSCUBE-1 (2019); NARSSCUBE-2 (2019); TIBA-1 (2019)
Ethiopia	Ethiopian Space Science and Technology Institute- ESSTI (2016)	Mount Entoto Astronomical observatory centre	ETRSS-1 (2019); ET-SMART- RSS (2020)
Ghana	Ghana Space Science and Technology Institute - GSSTI (2012)	32m Radio Telescope dish in Kutunse; Satellite Engineering centre; Earth Observation Centre; All Nations University- Space Systems and Technology Laboratory	GHANASAT 1 (2017)
Kenya	Kenya Space Agency- KSA (2017)	Luigi Broglio Space Centre in Malindi; Regional Centre for Mapping and Resource Development (RCMRD) in Nairobi	1KUNS-PF (2018)
Mauritius	Mauritius Research and Innovation Council- MRIC (2019)	Mauritius Radio Telescope in Bras d'Eau National Park, Flacq District	MIR-SAT1
Morocco	Royal Centre for Remote Sensing- CRTS (1993)	Royal Centre for Remote Sensing in Rabat	MAROC-TUBSAT (2001); MOHAMMED VI-A (2017); MOHAMMED VI-B (2018)
Nigeria	National Space Research and Development Agency- NASRDA (1999)	Centre for remote sensing in Jos; Centre for geodesy and geodynamics in Toro; Centre for Basic Space Science in Nsukka; Sounding rocket launch site in Epe; Satellite operation centre in Abuja	NIGERIASAT-1 (2001); NIGCOMSAT-1 (2007); NIGERIASAT-2 (2011); NIGERIASAT-X (2011); NIGCOMSAT-1R (2011); NIGERIAEDUSAT-1 (2017)
Rwanda	Rwanda Space Agency- RSA (2021)	Geospatial Data Hub in Kigali	RWASAT-1 (2019)
South Africa	South African National Space Agency- SANSA (2010)	Southern African Large Telescope (SALT) - 11 m optical telescope located near Sutherland; Square Kilometre Array (SKA) Radio Telescope in the Karoo (*currently under development*); Meer Karoo Array Telescope (MeerKAT) Radio Telescope in the Karoo (*predecessor to the SKA*); Satellite Application Centre with HartRAO—VLBI, geodesy and radio telescope in Hartebeeshoek; SANSA magnetic observatory and regional space weather centre in Hermanus; Overberg Test Range—Orbital launch pad and satellites ground station near Arniston	SUNSAT (1999); SUMBANDILA (2009); NEW DAWN (2011); ZACUBE-1 (2013); KONDOR-E (2013); INSIGHT-1 (2017); ZA-AEROSAT (2017); ZACUBE-2 (2018); EOSAT-1 (2019); MDSAT (2022)- *three satellite constellation
Sudan	The Remote Sensing and Seismology Authority- RSSA (1970)	University of Khartoum Space Research Centre.; Future University Kush Institute of Space Technology.; National Centre for Research Institute of Space Research and Aerospace (ISRA) .; National Centre for Research Remote Sensing and Seismology Authority.	SRSS-1 (2019)
Tunisia	Tunisian Space Agency- TSA (2012)		CHALLENGE-ONE (2021)

=== The African downstream/space applications sector ===
While space programmes in the US, Europe, and some cases, Asia, may be directed towards defence and planetary exploration, Africa's space identity is forged around the use of space technologies and infrastructures to solve socio-economic problems. Therefore, majority of Africa's space interests are focussed on the downstream (space applications) segment of the space value chain. The downstream segment of the space sector can be characterised into three main areas of interest:

1. Remote sensing- Involves the acquisition of data from Earth observation satellites, which is used to support search and rescue missions, for disaster management, metrology, land and coastal mapping and resource allocation, for military intelligence, surveillance and reconnaissance (ISR), and for research into climate change and atmospheric studies.
2. Telecommunications- Communications satellites are mainly used for telecommunication, tele-education, telemedicine, e-governance and e-commerce.
3. Navigation- mainly characterized by the Global Positioning System (GPS), which consists of a network of satellites that work in unity to determine the location of an object on the Earth's surface. Navigation satellites have a wide array of applications including, environmental monitoring, mapping and surveying, precision agriculture and farming, disaster management, land transportation, aviation and spaceflight. In the context of military applications, satellite systems can provide guidance for missiles to reach their designated targets.

In the African context, the EU global report on space 2021, has identified four main areas of interest that can benefit significantly from space-based data. These are agriculture, emergency response, resource management and infrastructure monitoring. As these are common areas of interest across the continent, various regional entities and collaborative projects have been initiated to pool resources from many African nations together to solve the salient issues within each of these sectors.

=== The Regional Centre for Mapping and Resource Development (RCMRD) ===
Prior to the advent of earth observation satellite technology, geographic information was mainly collected using a diversity of ground and aerial based conventional methods. In the early 1960s, Africa was thinking of establishing centres for the use of Earth Observation (EO data). In this regard, the first meeting of what was then called the UN Regional Cartographic Conference for Africa was held in Nairobi in 1963. A few years later, in Addis Ababa under the auspices of the United Nations Economic Committee for Africa (UNECA) and the organisation of African Unity (OAU), now known as the African Union (AU), agreements were made on the establishment of these EO centres, specifically for capacity development in natural resource mapping for the different regions of Africa. It was only 12 years later that the first regional centre was established in Nairobi, Kenya. In 1975, the Regional Centre for Services in Surveying, Mapping and Remote Sensing (RCSSMRS) was formed as an intergovernmental organisation. The organisation was formed by five founding members: Kenya, Uganda, Somalia, Tanzania and Malawi, to pool their resources together to benefit the member nations. A similar centre was set up in West Africa at about the same time. The establishment has since been renamed to the Regional Centre for Mapping and Resource Development (RCMRD) and over the years, the number of member states has grown to 20 countries from across Eastern and Southern Africa. When the centre was established, the main mandate was to focus on capacity development of the member countries in the field of natural resource mapping, particularly using new technologies like aerial photography and satellite remote sensing.

Initially, the centre's governing board was composed of mapping institutions. Over the years, the applications went to other areas- Meteorology, climate monitoring and disaster management to name a few. In addition to capacity development the centre also provided research and advisory services, advising countries on policy formation to technical methodologies on how to conduct their mapping programmes.

== Country-specific analysis ==
=== Ghana ===
Prior to the year 2011, Ghana did not have a significant presence in the global space arena. Most of the space activities in the country involved various ministries and institutions utilising EO data, bought from third party data providers (like Airbus) to gather intel for applications across various industries (most notably agriculture and transportation). The need for a national space science centre in Ghana naturally arose from the lack of coordination between organisations and programmes - different ministries and institutions were buying EO data to use individually which led to a lot of duplication and a waste of money. The proposed national space institution would resolve this issue by acting as a central location where data could be bought, stored and processed according to the needs of the relevant users. The institution would thus coordinate all space related activities/programmes across the country and eradicate the duplication issue. Ghana has also been a member of the UN Committee on the Peaceful Uses of Outer Space (COPUOS) since 2013 and has signed the Outer Space Treaty (1976), Rescue Agreement (1968) and Liability Convention (1972). Ghana's solitary space policy document was drafted and recently passed in parliament (2022). The policy will help structure Ghana's strategic goals and guide the coordination of activities around space science in the country.

==== Ghana Space Science and Technology Institute ====
Ghana Space Science and Technology Centre was established in January 2011 under the School of Nuclear and Allied Sciences (SNAS) and was officially opened in May 2012. By 2013, the centre grew into an institute, under the umbrella of the Ghana Atomic Energy Commission (GAEC) of the Ministry of Environment, Science, Technology and Innovation (MESTI) and was named The Ghana Space Science and Technology Institute (GSSTI). The institute developed three focus areas, namely: satellite communications and engineering, radio astronomy, and remote sensing and climate science, with the objective of utilising space science and technology towards socio-economic development of the country. The remote sensing centre has been able to determine landfill sites, to support waste management and subsequently assisted with the mitigation of health/environmental problems within the region. The centre also monitors some farmlands (e.g., maize crops) and provides information to farmers and insurance companies. The GSSTI's most notable milestone as of September 2022 has been the conversion of a 32m antenna, previously used as a ground satellite communications station, into a fully functional radio astronomy observatory in Kutunse. The Ghana Radio Astronomy Project (GRAP), as it was called, was initiated in 2012 and successfully completed in 2017 by GSSTI in collaboration with Vodafone and the South African Radio Astronomy Observatory (SARAO). The telescope will form part of the global very long baseline interferometry (VLBI) network and will be a key partner on the Square Kilometre Array project that will be hosted in South Africa.

==== The Development in Africa with Radio Astronomy (DARA) Programme ====
To provide the necessary human capital for SKA, the GSSTI has collaborated with the University of Leeds, in the United Kingdom, on the Development in Africa with Radio Astronomy (DARA) project. The project was initiated in 2014 and seeks to advance radio astronomy capabilities in several of the African SKA partner countries (including Botswana, Ghana, Kenya, Madagascar, Mauritius, Mozambique, Namibia, and Zambia). DARA has established a basic training programme with the intention of giving qualified individuals the chance to participate in the training, become familiar with the fundamentals of astrophysics and radio astronomy, and gain practical experience. The training is normally held at Ghana Space Science & Technology Institute (GSSTI), together with regional experts and professionals in radio astronomy from the UK, EU, and South Africa. The Newton Fund in the UK and additional funds from South Africa provide financial support towards the initiative. The programme hosted it last cohort of students in 2021/2022. as of September 2022, DARA has trained more than 250 students across the SKA countries and has given more than 50 students the opportunity to further their education (Masters/PhD level studies) in the UK and South Africa.

==== The All Nations University - Space Systems and Technology Laboratory ====
Coincidently, in February 2012, the Space Systems and Technology Laboratory was established at the All Nations University under the electronics and communications department. The aim of the All Nations University Space Systems and Technology Lab (ANU-SSTL) is to support the Ghana space programme by providing human capital development, through education and innovative research, in the field of space science and satellite engineering. Initially the institution began by training students using CanSats, as a tool to simulate satellite development. In 2014, the SSTL successfully designed and built a ground station that was able to communicate with the international space station. In December 2015, the SSTL developed a Sun photometer as part of the NASA Aerosol Robotic Network (AERONET), which measures the atmospheric aerosol column over the region and supports the reduction of greenhouse gas emissions in the region. The SSTL also trained students in nanosatellite technology- this was done in collaboration with Kyushu Institute of Technology (KYU Tech) in Japan under the BIRDS-1 programme. This subsequently led to the development of the first Ghanaian nanosatellite- GhanaSat 1 in 2017. The roughly 1 kg satellite was launched in July 2017, from the Kennedy Space Centre to the ISS and then deployed from the ISS using the Japanese Kibō CubeSat deployment module. The total cost of developing, launching and operating GhanaSat-1 was US$500k and was fully financed by the ANU university (which operates as a private entity). GhanaSat-1 contained both a low and high-resolution camera and was used to conduct coastal surveillance and mapping across the region. It de-orbited in 2019 as the last of the BIRDS-1 satellites.

==== Outlook ====
Given the success of GhanaSat-1, in 2018, the ANU-SSTL expressed interest in building another nanosatellite- GhanaSat-2, a meteorological satellite which will be developed in cooperation with the Ghana Meteorological Agency (GMA). The desire to launch GhanaSat-2, arises from the need to support various activities including: the detection of illegal mining in the region, monitoring of oil spills, improving weather forecast to support agriculture, deforestation surveillance and natural disaster monitoring. The Japanese Aerospace and Exploration Agency (JAXA) has already pledged its support on the GhanaSat-2 initiative. ANU-SSTL is also collaborating with Egypt, Nigeria, Kenya, Sudan and Uganda to build the African Development Satellite (AfDev-Sat), which will be used mainly to monitor climate change in Africa. Another major initiative is the African Constellation Satellite (AFCONSAT) project- which will commence in 2022 and will provide satellite development training to other countries in Africa who have under-developed space capabilities.

=== Nigeria ===
Nigeria has been involved in space activities since the 1960s, when NASA had established the first satellite earth station (NASA tracking station 5) in Kano, northern Nigeria in 1961. In 1976, in Addis Ababa, Nigeria announced its intention to go into space after recognizing the role that space technology (specifically telecommunications and Earth Observation) could play for socio-economic development in the country. However, space initiatives in the country did not gain much traction until 1998, when the National Centre for Remote Sensing was set up. The federal government of Nigeria then developed a space policy and space science and technology programme which led to the establishment of the National Space Research and Development Agency (NASRDA) in 1999, under the Federal Ministry of Science and Technology. NASRDA is located in the capital territory, Abuja, and is equipped with a ground receiving station. The agency has facilitated cooperation in space technology projects between Nigeria and many other international countries including: the United Kingdom, Ukraine, Russia and China.

==== The National Space Research and Development Agency (NASRDA) ====
The Nigerian space programme has five focus areas, namely:

1. Basic space science and technology- centred around fundamental research in the areas of space science, astrophysics and the space environment.
2. Remote Sensing- using data from EO satellites for natural resource management, including air, land and water resource management.
3. Satellite Meteorology- To study the atmosphere and climate using satellite data to facilitate the effective environmental management.
4. Communication and Information Technology- To provide reliable and efficient telecommunications services for Nigeria to enhance the growth of the industrial, commercial and administrative sectors of the economy.
5. Defence and Security- to utilise satellite data and imagery to aid national security and counter-terrorism efforts in the country.

In addition to these focus areas, the Nigerian space programme is also committed towards investing in the development of human resources and capacity building projects across multiple areas of space science and technology. NASRDA is also home to the regional support office for the UN disaster charter.

The implementation of the Nigerian space programme began in 2001, after the space policy was approved. To meet the objectives highlighted in the space policy, NARSDA has created six centres, scattered across the country, each centre focuses on a particular aspect of space science and technology, these centres are listed in the table below:

Centre	Location	Mandate
Centre for Satellite Technology Development (CSTD)	Abuja	Responsible for undertaking satellite manufacturing and conducting space missions.
Centre for Space Transport and Propulsion (CSTP)	Epe, Lagos	Responsible for manufacturing rockets and developing launch facilities
Centre for Basic Space Science and Astronomy (CBSSA)	Nsukka, Enugu	Responsible for carrying out research and development in the space environment.
Centre for Space Science Technology Education (CSSTE)	Ile-Ife Osun state	Responsible for capacity building in all areas of Space science and Technology.
National Centre for Remote Sensing	Jos	Responsible for carrying out research and development in the areas of Earth Observation and Remote Sensing applications.
Centre for Geodesy and Geodynamics	Toro	Responsible for carrying out research and development in areas of crustal movement.

Nigeria's space strategy was formulated in 2005 by NASRDA. The strategy contained a 25-year road map with three main objectives:

- Produce a Nigerian astronaut by 2015,
- Launch a Nigerian manufactured satellite by 2018,
- Launch a Nigerian made satellite, from a Nigerian launch site, on a Nigerian manufactured launch vehicle by 2025.

as of September 2022, none of these goals have been fully accomplished although, with the aid of international partners, Nigeria has been able to build and launch satellites. However, these satellites have all been launched from foreign soils as Nigeria has yet to develop a fully operational launch facility (although CSTP does have a rocket testing facility). Nigeria still holds on to the ambitious goal of sending a Nigerian astronaut to space by 2030.

In 2008, Nigeria established NigNet (Nigerian GNSS Reference Network), run by OSGoF4. Today, Nigeria operates close to 20 GNSS CORS ground stations serving as the country's fiducial geodetic network.

==== Satellites launched ====
as of September 2022, Nigeria owns six satellites (three of which are still operational), the first of which was named NigeriaSat-1, a medium resolution Earth Observation satellite, built by Surrey Satellite Technology Ltd. (SSTL) in the UK as part of the Disaster Monitoring Constellation (DMC). The satellite was launched from a Kosmos-3M rocket from the Russian Plesetsk spaceport on 27 September 2003. The primary objectives of NigeriaSat-1 were:

- To provide early warning signals of environmental disaster.
- To help detect and control desertification in the northern part of Nigeria.
- To assist in demographic planning
- To establish the relationship between vectors and the environment that breeds malaria and to give early warning signals on future outbreaks of meningitis using remote sensing technology.
- To provide the technology needed to bring education to all parts of the country through distant learning.
- To aid in conflict resolution and border disputes by mapping out state and international borders.

This was followed by the launch of NigComSat-1, Africa's first communication satellite that was ordered by Nigeria and built in China. It was launched on 13 May 2007, aboard a Chinese Long March 3B carrier rocket, from the Xichang Satellite Launch Centre in China. The primary mission objectives of NigComSat-1 were to improve communications, internet bandwidth and the provision of GSM services in Nigeria. In November 2008, NigComSat-1 failed in orbit after running out of power due to an anomaly in its solar array. It was later replaced by a new communications satellite, NigComSat-1R, launched from China on 19 December 2011. In addition to telecommunication services, NigComSat-1 also assists with the mapping of wetlands, helping farmers with crop production, desertification monitoring, finding optimum locations for the construction of dams, environmental impact assessments of oil drilling and locations of oil spills, and tracking border movements.

Prior to NigComSat-1R, two satellites: NigeriaSat-2 and NigeriaSat-X were built as High-resolution Earth Observation satellites by SSTL for the Disaster Management Constellation (DMC). The NigeriaSat-2 was launched into orbit by Ukrainian Dnepr rocket from a Yasny military base in Russia on 17 August 2011. Being a part of the disaster management constellation meant that these two satellites had similar mission objectives to NigeriaSat-1. The leading academic institute for space-related studies, the Federal Institute of Technology Akure (FUTA), participated in the Japanese Birds-1 programme which culminated in the creation and launch of NigeriaEduSat-1. The satellite was built mainly as a capacity building endeavour.

In 2017, NASDRA established the Institute of Space Science and Engineering as part of the African University of Science and Technology in Abuja. The main goal of the institute is to foster a human capital pipeline to the Nigerian space programme by providing training to engineers and scientists.

=== Kenya ===
==== San Marco Space Centre / Luigi Broglio Space Centre ====
Space activities in Kenya can be traced backed to 1964, when an agreement was signed between the government of Kenya and the Italian Space Commission on a joint-venture space science project. From this agreement, the San Marco Space Centre was established in the coastal town of Malindi. The centre was built in collaboration with NASA and Sapienza University of Rome as a satellite launching and tracking facility. The Malindi site was chosen for its geographic advantages- located on the equatorial region it allowed for more fuel-efficient launch prospects. The launch facility remained operational until 1988, with a total of 9 satellite launched in that timespan, the first of which was launched in 1967. Despite the decommissioning of launch capabilities, ground operations, like satellite communications and tracking remained active at the centre. These ground operations mostly supported satellite missions from NASA and ESA with telemetry tracking and control of satellites. In 2004, the centre was renamed to the Centro Spaziale Luigi Broglio or more commonly referred to as the Luigi Broglio Space Centre (LBSC).

==== Earth observation, remote sensing and communications activities ====
In the 1960s, Kenya had also expressed an interest in establishing centres with a focus on Earth Observation and remote sensing. Eventually, in 1975, the first Regional Center for Services in Surveying, Mapping and Remote Sensing (RCSSMRS) was formed as an intergovernmental organisation by five founding member states: Kenya, Uganda, Somalia, Tanzania and Malawi. The centre was later renamed to the Regional Centre for Mapping and Resource Development and is located the Kenyan capital city of Nairobi. It has since grown to accommodate 20 African member states from Eastern and Southern Africa. The RCMRD, together with the Department of Resource Surveys and Remote Sensing (DRSRS) and Survey of Kenya coordinate and manage the application of remote sensing technology in resource surveys in the country. In the early 1970s, in a collaboration with the British and American Military survey teams, Kenya began experimenting with geodetic positioning using Doppler Satellites. After some successful experiments, Kenya, in conjunction with the African Doppler Surveys (ADOS) project, acquired some Doppler satellite receivers and conducted limited Doppler satellite positioning surveys, with the goal of producing a common geodetic control framework for the African Continent. The project was coordinated by the RCSSMRS in Nairobi, between 1981 and 1986, and was sponsored by the International Association of Geodesy (IAG). Doppler Satellite Positioning has since been replaced by the Global Positioning System (GPS). Kenya has also been active in the field of Meteorology, i.e. utilising data from meteorological satellites for weather and climate monitoring, since the mid-1970s. This was initially done through Automatic Picture Transmission (APT) equipment, which receives the Earth's cloud images from the polar orbiting American National Ocean and Atmospheric Administration (NOAA) Satellite. Since then, high-resolution imaging technologies have significantly advanced the quality of cloud imagery and other environmental data received from these satellites and has resulted in more accurate weather forecasts and has advanced the field of climate modelling.

With regards to space communications in Kenya, satellite radio communications began in 1970 with the commissioning of Longonot I INTELSAT satellite Earth station. Later, in 1980, Longonot II was added to provide a global communications network. These two ground stations provided mixed analogue and digital international public communications services for telephony, telegraphy, telex, facsimile, data transmission and occasional television and radio programmes and served three East African countries, namely: Kenya, Uganda and Tanzania. The technology at the centre has since become obsolete and the station has been abandoned. However, there is potential to revive the station and convert the defunct antennae into a radio telescope to support the SKA project.

==== Kenya Space Agency - formation, milestones and outlook ====
The advent of the 21st century saw significant developments taking place in the Kenyan space programme. First, in 2009, the Kenyan National Space Secretariat (NSS) was established with the hopes of formulating the National Space Agency. However, it wasn't until 2017 that the Kenyan space agency was eventually established, with the mandate to ”Promote, coordinate and regulate space related activities in Kenya. Even before the establishment of the Agency, in 2015, the University of Nairobi embarked on a project to build Kenya's first nanosatellite. The university received technical assistance from JAXA, Sapienza university of Rome, and other Italian commercial entities to build the 1U CubeSat, which was named the First Kenya University Nano Satellite-Precursor Flight, or 1KUNS-PF. The satellite was launched in April 2018 and deorbited in June 2020.

At present, Kenya is an active participant in the African Resource Management Satellite Constellation (ARMC) initiative and the Square Kilometre Array radio telescope project with other member nations. Additionally, as part of its strategic plan, the Kenyan Space Agency has been involved in many projects, and plans to add more into the pipeline soon:

- Kenya has participated in the Africa Regional Data Cube (ARDC) project, which is a platform containing 17 years of satellite imagery and Earth Observation data. The data is currently available for Kenya, Ghana, Senegal, Sierra Leone, and Tanzania and is used to address salient issues relating to agriculture, food security, deforestation, urbanization, illegal mining, water access, and more.
- Kenya has contributed to the rollout of the Global Learning & Observations to Benefit the Environment (GLOBE) project, which aims to promote a scientific understanding of the Earth system and global environment through the uptake of space-related subjects. The project connects stakeholders from the public and private sectors.
- The Kenyan Space Agency has allocated funds to three local universities to conduct space weather research. Discussions on the possible development of a Space weather monitoring network, aiming to provide real-time monitoring of space weather to mitigate events affecting communications, navigation, etc. have been initiated.
- Development of a Satellite Imagery Analysis Portal with geospatial data management & analysis software to help address the needs of satellite data users, giving them a better picture of their land resources and land change.
- KSA together with its Italian partners plan to launch more nanosatellites and sounding rockets from the Malindi ground station from 2022 onwards.

=== Rwanda ===
Rwanda is one of the youngest players in the African space landscape. Although, the country had been investing greatly into the development of ICT infrastructure and applications since the early 2000s, Rwanda's interest in utilising space services only gained traction in 2017. At this time, the national Ministry of Defence, together with the Rwanda Utilities Regulatory Authority (RURA), established a Space Working Group (SWG) to coordinate the early space initiatives that were taking shape across the country. As a result of the SWG, the necessary framework for the Rwandan Space Agency, along with a programme management office was established.

==== Satellites ====
In 2019, before the national space agency came into existence, Rwanda successfully procured two satellites. The first of these satellites was RwaSat-1, a 3U Earth Observation cubesat. The satellite was built and launched as a collaborative effort between the Rwandan government (involving three Rwandan engineers), the University of Tokyo and the Japanese Aerospace Exploration Agency (JAXA). It was launched in September 2019 and was subsequently deployed from the ISS. RwaSat-1 is equipped with multispectral cameras and is primarily used by the Ministry of Agriculture to support soil moisture analysis in addition to satellite data-based land use surveys and crop yield estimates. The Rwasat-1 project offered a unique opportunity for Rwandan engineers to gain valuable experience in mission design, assembly and integration of a satellite. The project also served as a catalyst for the formation of the Rwandan space agency. In the words of current chief executive officer Col. Francis Ngabo:

“The leadership of our country then deemed the creation of a space agency as the next logical step to ensure Rwanda’s sustainable presence in space.”

Rwanda's second satellite, nicknamed Icyerekezo (‘Vision’ in Kinyarwanda), was a 150 kg communications satellite, that was built by Airbus DS in Toulouse (France). The satellite was launched from Kourou, French Guiana and placed into orbit in 2019, resulting from an agreement with OneWeb. Although, Rwanda does not officially own the satellite, the national Ministry of Telecommunications utilises it as a platform to provide free high-speed Internet to the rural educational centres in the island of San Pierre Nkombo in Lake Kivu. This has resulted in the increased accessibility of high-quality education in previously geographically constrained areas.

==== Establishment of the Rwanda Space Agency ====
In May 2020, the Rwandan government adopted a bill which led to the creation of the Rwandan Space Agency (RSA), which is now currently operational in the capital city of Kigali. The RSA's mandate is “to regulate and coordinate all space activities in the country while also creating an environment that encourages entrepreneurial and industrial development.” The agency strives to utilise space services to drive socio-economic development in the country. The ministry of ICT and innovation has identified the key strategic objectives for the Rwandan space programme, namely:

- To act as a catalyst for space initiatives on the African continent.
- To drive the growth of tertiary education in space sciences and engineering and related fields at the Universities across Rwanda and foster international academic co-operation.
- To conduct Research and investment in strategic projects such as a geospatial analytics hub and a continental ground station network.
- To promote the development of the space economy both locally and across the continent of Africa. For example, developing the capabilities to service all geospatial needs of the African market.

At present, Rwanda has managed to develop what can be considered a geospatial hub (GeoHub), where every single geolocated dataset within the government of Rwanda is housed under one roof at the space agency. The government and various other stakeholders can now access this dataset and derive insights according to their needs.

In 2021, The RSA, together with international partners, supported various governments with monitoring the effects of the Mt. Nyirangongo eruption in neighbouring DRC and the aftermath of the earthquakes using Interferometric synthetic aperture radar (InSAR) analysis. The InSAR analysis, was able to identify the epicentres of the earthquakes, and this helped some of the decision makers, and emergency responders with evacuation of over 1 million people in just a few days. Satellite imagery has also helped with the tracking of refugees during the height of a COVID-19 pandemic. The GeoHub will also use data to guide decision-making in other critical sectors, including agriculture, urban planning, and mining, among others.

In alignment with their downstream approach, Rwanda has become a member of Digital Earth Africa and has established partnerships with the South African National Space Agency among other African space agencies. In addition to the partnership with the University of Tokyo on the RwaSat-1 project, Rwanda also has partnerships in some form with the German Aerospace Agency (DLR) and the European Space Agency (ESA). The country hopes to continue growing its foreign partnerships in the coming years.

==== Outlook ====
It is worth noting that African governments spend millions each year for the acquisition and utilisation of space-based data from third party commercial entities. Rwanda is attempting to move away from this model and is looking at paving the way for other African countries to meet their own demands. This ambition was reiterated, in October 2021, when the Rwandan government filed a request to acquire two satellite constellations from the International Telecommunication Union (ITU). Moreover, a local company, Ngali Holdings, in cooperation with an American satcom company, GlobalStar, are currently working towards building a network of ground stations, which can receive satellite imagery and data. The first ground station is planned to be located in Rwamagana (60 kilometres from Kigali). The Rwandan space programme has identified capacity building as one of its main pillars and has plans to implement training programmes to help foster space science and technology expertise in the country, with the hope of establishing more collaborations with international universities. Currently Rwandan technicians are being trained at institutions in the US, Japan and Israel. RSA has also been exploring the possibility of creating a centre of excellence, focussing specifically on space-related projects however, the onset of the COVID-19 pandemic in recent years has halted progress on this initiative. Overall, Rwanda's space programme is still in its infancy. Despite the country's short history in the space sector, it has managed to accomplish a lot in relative terms, considering its small size, lack of infrastructure and resources. With great ambitions and a drive to meet them, Rwanda is poised to be a key player in the African space ecosystem in the future.

== See also ==
- African Space Agency
