= African Space Agency =

African Union's space organisation

Agency overview
- Formed: 24 January 2023; 3 years ago
- Type: Space agency
- Jurisdiction: African Union
- Status: Active
- Headquarters: New Cairo, Egypt; 30°03′13.01″N 31°36′40.36″E
- Website: africanspaceagency.org

The African Space Agency (AfSA) is a continental space organisation established by the African Union (AU) to promote cooperation between the space policies of the AU's member states. The AU adopted the African Space Policy and Strategy in 2016 and agreed upon the statute underlying AfSA in 2018. This marked the birth of the African Space Agency as an Organ of the African Union.

A technical evaluation process was undertaken to select the host country, and in 2019, Egypt was endorsed as the host. In 2023, the African Union adopted the structural and financial implications of the AfSA. The headquarters of the African Space Agency is now hosted in Cairo, alongside the Egyptian Space Agency (EgSA).

== History ==
Numerous unrelated space initiatives have emerged among and between various African Union countries. The Regional African Satellite Communication Organization (RASCOM) was an early regional initiative, launched in 1992 with 45 members and achieved limited success, eventually launching one satellite in 2007 and another in 2010. Two African Regional Centres for Space Science and Technology Education were set up in 1998, an English-speaking one in Nigeria and a French-speaking one in Morocco. A proposed African Resource Management (ARM) satellite constellation joint project was proposed around 2000, and founded in 2003 by Algeria, Kenya, Nigeria, and South Africa. The first formal partnerships were agreed upon in 2009. Nigeria then launched NigSat-2 with the intention it be part of this constellation. The first national space agencies among African Union states were the National Space Research and Development Agency of Nigeria, the Algerian Space Agency, and the South African National Space Agency. All operated in the early 21st century, alongside space programmes from other states.

Discussions about setting up a pan-African space agency began around this period. Planning was inspired by the European Space Agency (ESA). The idea of such a space agency was included in the AU's 2009–2012 strategic plan. An August 2010 declaration from the Third African Union (AU) Conference of Ministers in charge of Communications and Information Technologies directed the African Union Commission to look into developing such an agency alongside a dedicated space policy. The idea was supported the next month in a joint statement with the European Commission. A September 2011 statement from the African Leadership Conference on Space Science and Technology for Sustainable Development states cooperation could occur before a pan-African institution was established. A 2012 meeting of the same AU Conference of Ministers reiterated the call for an AU space policy. The name "AfriSpace" was proposed at this time. By 2014, a draft policy had been developed.

An African Space Policy and Strategy was adopted in January 2016. The AU continued to discuss development with the European Space Agency. Officials also met with the European Union Agency for the Space Programme. During 2016 there were 20 national civilian space agencies and departments. There were some views that a pan-African agency would be premature, with better outcomes being possible instead through focusing on increased cooperation between these national agencies.

The Statute of the African Space Agency was adopted in January 2018. Bids to host the agency came from Egypt, Ethiopia, Namibia, and Nigeria. A bid from Ghana arrived too late, and Namibia later withdrew its bid. The February 2019 32nd African Union Summit saw a resolution passed to create a headquarters for the agency which would be based in Egypt. It was intended that operations would begin in 2022. Egypt supported its bid by pledging $10 million to AfSA. Following this decision the program was delayed, following concerns over budget availability and the immediate benefits to other countries.

A final agreement was signed with the host country Egypt on 24 January 2023, with the country agreeing to turn over the finished building to the institution by the end of the year. AfSA will be opened in three phases throughout 2023.

As of the formation of the AfSA in early 2023, less than 50 satellites were controlled by African states. Most of these belonged to Algeria, Angola, Egypt, Kenya, Morocco, Nigeria, and South Africa.

== Location ==
The headquarters has been built in New Cairo, alongside the Egyptian Space Agency (EgSA), located near the capital Cairo. This site is intended to support other space-related buildings, including research buildings and satellite manufacturing plants.

A Pan-African University of Space Science and Technology is expected to be set up in South Africa and support AfSA, although this initiative has stalled.

== Aims ==
The agency was officially founded to promote policy and strategy cooperation and coordination within the African Union member states. It is intended to have a coordination role, rather than being directly involved with satellite production and space launches.

The establishment of the agency is seen as a positive contribution to the AU's Agenda 2063, with the AU's space policy and strategy is one of 15 key programmes within the agenda.

== Council ==
In February 2024 the Executive Council of the African Union elected and appointed the first African Space Council, composed of ten people from African Union member states. The council members are:

Name	Country	Appointed	Role
Dr Tidiane Ouattara	Cote d’Ivoire	February 2026	President
Dr Rakiya Babamaaji	Nigeria	February 2026	Member
Thandikile Chisala Mbvundula	Malawi	February 2026	Vice-President
Lisho Mundia	Namibia	February 2026	Member
Amal Layachi	Morocco	February 2026	Member
Aboubaker Hassan Ali	Djibouti	February 2026	Member
Dr Éliane Ubalijoro	Rwanda	February 2026	Member
Amin Mestar	Algeria	February 2026	Member

== See also ==
- History of space in Africa
- African Union
- List of government space agencies
