= Alsat-3A =

Algerian high-resolution earth observation satellite

- Mission type: Earth observation
- Operator: ASAL
- COSPAR ID: 2026-009A
- SATCAT no.: 67474
- Website: asal.dz
- Mission duration: 5 years (expected)

Spacecraft properties
- Manufacturer: CAST
- Launch mass: 500 kilograms (1,100 lb)
- Dry mass: 500 kilograms (1,100 lb)
- Dimensions: 2 metres (6.6 ft) length, 1 metre (3.3 ft) diameter, 4 metres (13 ft) span

Start of mission
- Launch date: 15 January 2026, 04:01:00 UTC
- Rocket: Long March 2C
- Launch site: Jiuquan, Launch Area 94
- Contractor: CASC

Orbital parameters
- Reference system: Geocentric
- Regime: Sun-synchronous
- Periapsis altitude: 489 kilometres (304 mi)
- Apoapsis altitude: 627 kilometres (390 mi)
- Inclination: 97.4 degrees
- Epoch: 16 January 2026

Alsat-3A is an Algerian Earth observation satellite operated by the Algerian Space Agency, designed to capture high-resolution images of Earth's surface, resource management, and disaster response. Launched on 15 January 2026 using Long March 2C, the satellite was developed through a collaboration between Algeria and China. It represents an advancement over the earlier Alsat-2 series (Alsat-2A, Alsat-2B) in terms of imaging resolution and technical capabilities.

== See also ==
- Alcomsat-1
- AlSAT-1
- Alsat-1B/2B
- Alsat-2A
- Algerian Space Agency
