= European South African Science and Technology Advancement Programme =

ESASTAP
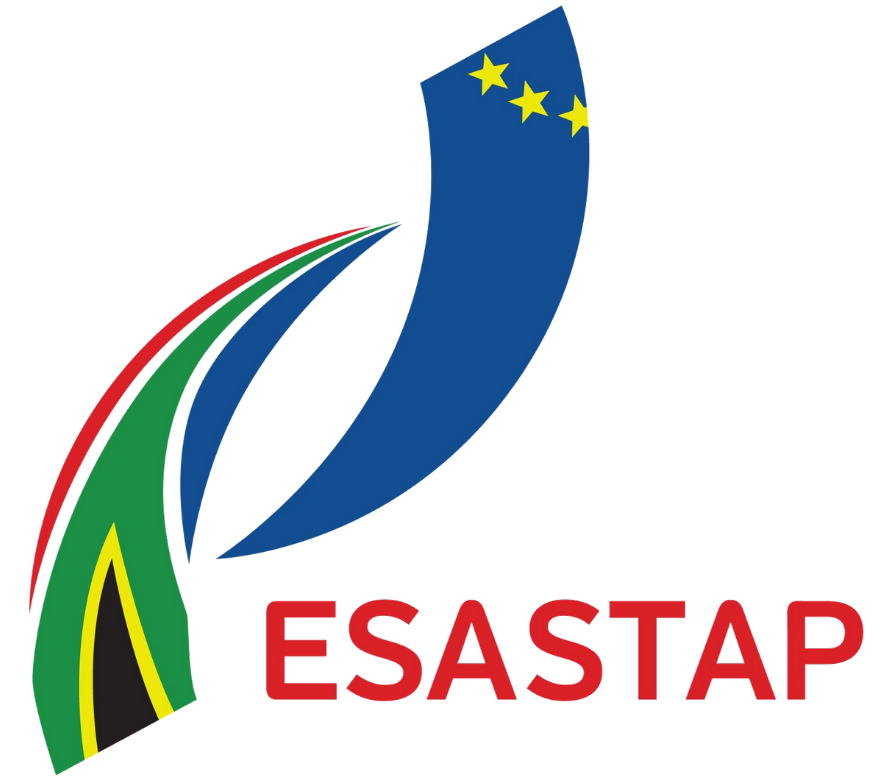
- Type: Non-profit organisation
- Founded: 2005
- Headquarters: Pretoria, South Africa
- Website: www.esastap.org.za

The European South African Science and Technology Advancement Programme (ESASTAP) promotes research and development cooperation between South Africa and the European Union. Its offices are located at the CSIR Campus in Pretoria, South Africa and Brussels, Belgium.

== History ==
The programme has evolved in an iterative manner, adapting to changing relationships and advancements in technology within the SA-EU context.

Iteration Name	Period	Core Objectives	Further Reading
ESASTAP FP6 (BILAT)	2005-2007	Raising awareness of FP7 and other EU funding opportunities	
ESASTAP 2 FP7 (BILAT)	2008-2012	Raising awareness of FP7 and engaging with identified needs and challenges stemming from the JSTCC and other dialogues	
SAccess FP7 (Access4EU)	2010-2013	Raising awareness of SA funding opportunities in Europe	
ESASTAP Plus FP7 (BILAT)	2012-2015	Support deepening of scientific and technological cooperation with a special focus on innovation	
ESASTAP 2020	2016-2019	H2020 Horizon 2020 is the eighth framework programme funding research, technological development, and innovation.	South Africa's Participation in H2020
ESASTAP	2021 onwards		

== Funding ==
The major sources of funding for ESASTAP are the European Commission, through the Seventh Framework Programme, and the South African Department of Science and Innovation.

In the 2020/2021 financial year, the department received official development assistance (ODA) from the European Union of R5 000 000 over a three-year period, earmarked for ESASTAP projects and activities.
