= Egyptian Space Agency =

Official Egyptian space program

EgSA
- Egyptian Space Agency
- وكالة الفضاء المصرية
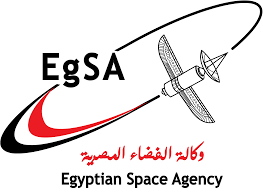
- Abbreviation: EgSA
- Predecessor: Egyptian Space Program (1960–1967); NARSS (1973–2018)
- Formation: 17 January 2018
- Type: Space agency
- Headquarters: New Cairo
- Location: Egypt
- Chief Executive Director: Prof. Dr. Sherif Sedky
- Budget: £65 million EGP (2021)
- Website: https://egsa.gov.eg/

The Egyptian Space Agency (EgSA; Egyptian Arabic: وكالة الفضاء المصرية, romanized: Wakālat al-Faḍāʼ al-Miṣrīyah) is an Egyptian space program founded on 17 January 2018, succeeding the National Authority for Remote Sensing & Space Sciences (NARSS) as the premier space authority in Egypt. Egyptian space program has initially launched operations in 1960. The EgSA headquarters are housed in the Egyptian Space City, which also houses the African Space Agency (AfSA) headquarters, after Egypt won a bid to the African Union for its hosting in 2019.

The agency operates under the scope of the Egyptian Government and sees many of its executive decisions made at a presidential level. EgSA is currently responsible for satellite launches and monitoring, as well providing a platform for affiliated STEM fields to further develop in Egypt. The agency and its predecessor have administered 13 satellites as of August 2024, with the first one being EgyptSat 1 in 2007, and the most recent being NEXSAT-1 launched on 3 February 2024.

== History ==
=== Establishment of EgSA ===
After drafting a law facilitating the founding of an Egyptian Space Agency, the Egyptian Council of Ministers had deferred the action to the Parliament of Egypt, which soon approved the law on 14 November 2017, and finally it was ratified by President Abdel-Fattah al-Sisi as Law no.3 of 2018, officially establishing EgSA on 17 January 2018. To house this agency, a 5,000 square meter "space city" is being constructed consisting of twenty-three buildings, located in-between the fifth settlement of New Cairo and the country's New Administrative Capital (NAC). The EgSA has already begun operations in the space city, though it likely will not be fully operational for years.

== Management ==
The Egyptian Space Agency is (at a basic level) headed by a Chief Executive Director, the current head is Prof. Dr. Sherif Sedky (19 August 2022–present), who was preceded by Prof. Dr. Mohamed El-Qousi (January 2018-August 2022), the first to hold the position. All two of the Chief Executive Directors of the EgSA have been selected through Presidential Decree. The EgSA is altogether headed by a Board of Directors established by presidential decree in 2019, members of which include the Chief Executive Director of EgSA, the prime minister of Egypt, the minister of higher education, the minister of communications and information technology, and several representatives from multiple other ministries.
