= DIPLOMICS =

DIPLOMICS (Distributed Platform in OMICS) is a South African national research-infrastructure initiative designed to enable and strengthen capacity in “omics” sciences (genomics, proteomics, metabolomics, bioinformatics) across the country. Set out to "Enable the Omics Research Community "this is one of the research infrastructure programmes launched under the South African Research Infrastructure Roadmap (SARIR) by the Department of Science, Technology and Innovation (DSI). The programme is hosted by the Centre for Proteomic & Genomic Research in Cape Town which is the coordinating node for the network and monitors infrastructure investment, training, service provision, and partnerships.

== History and Background ==
DIPLOMICS was conceived as a distributed infrastructure to provide high-throughput omics capabilities to support human-health, animal-health, agricultural/food-biotech and biodiversity research. The idea was to build on existing facilities and bring them into a coordinated national network, provide access to advanced instrumentation, training, human capital development, and support open science and service provision to external researchers.

== Objectives ==
DIPLOMICS lists multiple key objectives, including:

- To enable students and researchers to access omics technology and expertise across South Africa.
- To build a world-class omics infrastructure across the country, via instrument acquisition, service & maintenance contracts, installation of laboratory information management systems
- To implement intensive human-capital development programmes (training technicians, scientists, bioinformaticians) and increase awareness of the omics community in South Africa.
- To deliver high-impact, high-visibility projects that leverage the infrastructure and capabilities of the network.

== Infrastructure & Investment ==
Since its establishment (roughly from 2017 onwards), DIPLOMICS has invested significantly in equipment, training and service infrastructure, including

- Investment in laboratory infrastructure support * Training for technicians, students, researchers
- maintenance service contracts for sophisticated omics instrumentation

== Initiatives & Projects ==
Some of the noteworthy initiatives within the DIPLOMICS programme include:

- 1KSA (Decoding South Africa's Biodiversity): South African species remain absent from global genomic datasets. The 1KSA Project is sequencing the genomes of over 1,000 South African species, using long-read sequencing technologies (such as Oxford Nanopore) and bioinformatics workflows and making biodiversity visible
- NNGWE (rare & undiagnosed disease project): aims to use genomics to shorten diagnosis time and increase precision in rare-disease cases.
- D-CYPHR: A facility/hub in proteomics & metabolomics established through the network labs supported by DIPLOMICS.
- Training and human capital development programmes aimed at increasing access especially for historically disadvantaged institutions and students.

=== Impact & Significance ===
The significance of DIPLOMICS is multi‐fold:

- It democratizes access to advanced omics technologies and expertise across South Africa, thereby enhancing research capacity in genomics, proteomics & metabolomics.
- By building a national network, it helps avoid duplication of expensive instrumentation and promotes coordination of infrastructure nationwide.
- It creates skilled technicians, bioinformaticians and researchers who can operate in the global omics domain.
- It drives cross-cutting research in health, agriculture, biodiversity, conservation, and bio-economy by providing the technological backbone.
- It aligns with national policy for research infrastructure and innovation, supporting South Africa's goal of being internationally competitive in omics research.

== Challenges & Considerations ==
Like many large research infrastructure programmes, DIPLOMICS likely faces several challenges (some implicit):

- Ensuring sustainability of instrumentation (maintenance, upgrades) and training of staff.
- Facilitating data management, large data transfer, storage and analysis (e.g., in the biodiversity project 1KSA, large-scale data transfer is mentioned).
- Achieving equitable access across geographically and institutionally diverse labs, including historically disadvantaged institutions.
- Translating infrastructure investment into impactful scientific outputs, publications, industry partnerships and innovation outcomes.

== Location & Access ==
The host facility for DIPLOMICS is at 108 Albert Road, Woodstock, Cape Town, Western Cape, South Africa.
