= Aerospace Systems Research Institute =

South African research institute

Aerospace Systems Research Institute (ASRI)
- Formerly: ASReG
- Industry: Aerospace, Research, Consulting
- Founded: 2009 in Durban, South Africa
- Headquarters: Durban, Republic of South Africa
- Number of employees: Approximately 25 full-time staff (2026)

The Aerospace Systems Research Institute (ASRI) is a South African aerospace institute headquartered at the University of KwaZulu-Natal, Durban. The group is focused on space technologies with a long-term goal of providing sovereign access to space for the Republic of South Africa.

== History ==
=== Aerospace Systems Research Group (ASReG) ===
ASREG was founded in 2009 by Professors Jean Pitot and Michael Brooks. The initial goal of ASReG was to "develop aerospace technologies related to rockets, space vehicles, and human skills in aerospace engineering." The group was small, with work conducted by MSc and PhD students. The group's first launch occurred in August 2014 and, as of early 2026, the group has conducted six hybrid rocket launches and several liquid rocket development campaigns.

Notably, in 2021, the group set a new African hybrid amateur rocket altitude record of 17.9 km, almost doubling the previous African altitude record and being third in altitude globally across all university group hybrid rocket flights.

=== Organization as an institute ===
In 2022, the group was institutionalized as the Aerospace Systems Research Institute by the council of UKZN. Since then, the group has conducted multiple test campaigns and has undergone facility development to upgrade their capabilities and accommodate further growth.

The group has multiple programs and development branches. Their most well-known projects are the Phoenix hybrid rocket series and the development of the SAFFIRE liquid rocket engine.

== Launch vehicles ==
=== Phoenix ===
Phoenix being launched from the Overberg Test Range

Phoenix is a single stage hybrid launch vehicle which uses paraffin wax and gaseous nitrous oxide as propellent. It serves as a development platform for training ASRI's human capital, giving them experience in rocket launches, and a small-scale technology development platform.

In 2021, the institute launched Phoenix-1B Mk IIr, which reached 17.9 km and broke the African altitude record for hybrid rocketry. Furthermore, this was the third-highest altitude attained by a university group hybrid rocket program worldwide.

=== Sub-Orbital Test Vehicle (STeVe) ===
The Sub-Orbital Test Vehicle (STeVe) is ASRI's first ever liquid propellent launch vehicle which is currently under development. STeVe will be an electropump-driven, spin-stabilized, LOX-Kerosene vehicle powered by a single SAFFIRE engine. The target for the rocket is to reach the Kármán line, with ASRI becoming the first sovereign group in Africa to do so. Furthermore, STeVe will serve as a test bed for the SAFFIRE engine and other space technologies required for CLV.

CLV on the launch pad

=== Commercial Launch Vehicle (CLV) ===
The Commercial Launch Vehicle (CLV) is ASRI's planned orbital launch vehicle. CLV will feature nine SAFFIRE engines on its first stage, and a singular, vacuum-optimized, SAFFIRE-V engine on the 2nd stage, similar to Rocket Lab's Electron launch vehicle. The group has set 2030 as the targeted date for the first orbital launch of CLV, although this success is dependent on navigating complex regulatory boundaries and obtaining necessary funding/investment.

The vehicle is intended to deliver 200 kg of payload to a 500 km sun-synchronous orbit.

== South African First Integrated Rocket Engine (SAFFIRE) ==
A render of the SAFFIRE rocket engine

The development of the South African First Integrated Rocket Engine (SAFFIRE) has been an important focus for ASRI.

The program's development began with a simplified design known as the Ablative Blow-down Liquid Engine (ABLE). The group successfully tested this engine in the 2021 test campaign at Denel Overberg Test Range.

This version of the rocket engine was ablatively cooled and produced almost 18 kN of thrust.

Since then, the program has focused on developing the technology into a reliable, and flight-suitable, engine to support ASRI's long-term goals.

== Launch campaigns ==
=== Phoenix ===
Vehicle Version	Date and time	Launch Outcome	Maximum Altitude	Mach Number	Launch Site	Notes
Phoenix-1A	August 2014	Success	2.6 km		Denel Overberg Test Range	ASReG's (now ASRI's) first launch. Nozzle fracture in flight limited altitude to 2.6 km
Phoenix-1B	2019	Failure	10 m	Negligible	Denel Overberg Test Range	Software bug caused premature closure of propellant valve
Phoenix-1B Mk I	2021	Success	11.1 km	1.3	Denel Overberg Test Range	
Phoenix-1B Mk IIr	2021	Success	18 km	2.0	Denel Overberg Test Range	Maximum altitude currently achieved by the group, broke the altitude record for african hybrid rocketry
Phoenix-1D	13 March 2023	Success	13 km	1.34 (Max measured)	Denel Overberg Test Range	
Phoenix-1C	16 March 2023	Success	8 km	1.39	Denel Overberg Test Range	
Phoenix-1D	2 Dec 2024	Success	16.7 km	2.06	Denel Overberg Test Range	
Phoenix-1E	4 Dec 2024	Success	11.8 km	1.83	Denel Overberg Test Range	

== Facilities ==
=== Headquarters and offices ===
In August 2025, the construction of ASRI's new offices and Advanced Manufacturing Facility (AMF) was completed. The official opening occurred on the 11th of November 2025, with an unveiling by the Director-General of the Department of Science, Technology and Innovation.

Render of the AMF. Construction completed late 2025

=== Advanced Manufacturing Facility (AMF) ===
The construction of the Advanced Manufacturing Facility (AMF), funded by the Department of Science, Technology and Innovation, was an upgrade to ASRI's manufacturing capabilities allowing up to 70% of components to be manufactured locally. This upgrade shortens testing and production timelines to help meet ASRI's goals. The facility also does work for external clients.

=== Overberg Test Range Launch Gantry ===
Launch gantry in the horizontal position during loading

The Department of Science, Technology and Innovation funded the development of a sub-orbital sounding rocket launch gantry. The gantry is sized to accommodate ASRI's sub-orbital rockets as well as being able to accommodate larger solid propellant sounding vehicles from foreign nations.

The gantry is capable of 360-degree horizontal rotation and can tilt up to 90 degrees vertically, allowing for accurate launch trajectory planning.

== See also ==
- South African National Space Agency
