= Ghana Space Science and Technology Centre =

Space technology agency in Ghana

Ghana Space Science and Technology Institute
- (GSSTI); Ghana Space Agency

Space Science and Space Exploration overview
- Formed: 2 May 2012; 14 years ago
- Type: Space travel; Space exploration; Space medicine; Space research; and Astronomy
- Headquarters: Ga East, Greater Accra; 5.66310°N 0.23002°W
- Employees: 23
- Ministers responsible: Hon. Ophelia Mensah Hayford
- Child Space Science and Space Exploration: Ghana Space Agency
- Website: https://gssti.org

The Ghana Space Science and Technology Institute (GSSTI) was opened officially on 2 May 2012 as Ghana’s first space science, space exploration, astronomy and technology space agency. It is an Institution under the Ghana Atomic Energy Commission. GSSTI and Ghana Space Agency (GhSA) aim to become an arena of excellence in space science, space exploration and space technology through teaching, learning, private spaceflight and space research commercialisation. The centre and space agency will also allow scientists and astronauts to conduct research into astrophysics, remote sensing, natural resource management, weather forecasting, agriculture and national security.

== History ==
The Ghana Space Science and Technology Institute (GSSTI) was first established as a Centre under the School of Nuclear and Allied Sciences (SNAS) in January 2011 and launched in May 2012. It was later upgraded to an Institute in August 2013, to exploit space science and technology for socio-economic development of the country.

== Operations ==
The GSSTI space agency's first flagship project is the Ghana Radio Astronomy Project which will see the abandoned Vodafone earth satellite station at Kuntunse, near Accra which have the 32 metre dish turned into a radio astronomy telescope. In 2012, work was conducted by Ghanaian experts of the GSSTI and South African experts of the Square Kilometre Array (SKA-SA) of South African National Space Agency to replace worn out parts. The 32 metre radio telescope was commissioned as the Ghana Radio Astronomy Observatory (GRAO) on 24 August 2017, by the President of Ghana, HE Nana Addo Dankwa Akuffo Addo and the Minister of Science of South Africa, Hon Grace Naledi Mandisa Pandor.

The GSSTI is working with the China National Space Administration to engage with astronauts, students, and young professionals about collaboration with the centre and space agency; and it has already embarked on outreach programmes to schools and has run tours to scientific sites.

== Technicity ==
Between the years of 2012 and 2024, Ghana is reportedly seeking USD 5–10 billion in finance and funding support to develop the centre's infrastructure and human capacity. It has approached a global consortium of multinational institutions – including the China Development Bank, and the bank HSBC – as well as requesting technical advice from the China National Space Administration, and NASA for space science exploration, and institutions in Japan, Japan Aerospace Exploration Agency and India, Indian Space Research Organisation.

The agency is planning to complete its first satellite by 2020. In 2015, the government allocated $10 million to research nuclear and space science technology. The goal of the funding is to increase outreach and work towards Earth imaging satellites, so they do not have to purchase imagery from other countries. As of 2016, there are 20 employees working at the institute. A major driver of Earth monitoring satellites is to curtail the increase in illegal mining, which has a negative effect on the environment.

== Notable staff ==
- Dr. Joseph B. Tandoh, Director, GSSTI
- Dr. Kofi Asare, Manager, Remote Sensing and Climate Centre
- Dr. Theophilus Ansah-Narh, Manager, Radio Astronomy & Astrophysics Centre
- Mr. Emmanuel Mornoh, Manager, Satellite Communications & Engineering Centre

== See also ==
- List of aerospace engineering topics
