= National Space Program (Algeria) =

Algerian space program

The National Space Program (PSN) horizons 2020 planned to put in place space infrastructures, and space systems and increase the specialized human resources in space technologies. Among the space systems planned in the PSN are Algeria's satellites (Alsat-2A, Alsat -2b, Alsat -3, Alsat -4, African Resource Management ARM and the communications satellite Alcomsat-1), of which a significant number should be partly or totally integrated into the Algerian center for satellite development "CDS". CDS offers the technological environment for national competence to develop the future Algerian satellite systems. Algeria's objective is to make space tools a powerful instrument in national prosperity in the fields of earth observation, meteorology and communications.

== CDS in the National Space Program ==
CDS comprises:

- A satellite integration hall: a clean room of 27 meters x 11 meters
- A satellite environmental tests building.
- Rooms and equipment for the components storage, cleaning, inspection, assembly and integration equipment, etc.
- Alsat-2 S-Band antenna system and control ground segments.
- Alsat-1B S/X Band antenna system and control ground segments.

The CDS is organized in 6 departments:

- Space systems and missions.
- Satellite engineering
- Satellites AIT
- Environment testing
- Quality and process
- Research on space technology

Those departments house mechanical and thermal, electrical, electronic and optics research and development laboratories.

=== Satellite integration building ===
The satellite integration building consists of a large clean room of class 100000, with 4 subareas dedicated to:

- satellite integration.
- satellite subsystems assembly.
- solar systems integration
- subarea for optical integration / alignment, class 100 on a seismic bloc.

Those areas are separated by sliding curtains.

=== Satellite environmental tests building ===
The satellite environmental tests building is also planned for the future, this building shall consist of:

- anechoic chamber for EMC tests
- thermal vacuum chamber
- vibration test chamber
- acoustic test chamber

=== Main missions of the CDS ===
Missions:

- development of satellites (up to 1000 kg)
- integration of space subsystems and solar panels (class 100.000)
- integration of space optics (class 100)
- functional and environmental tests.
- quality insurance of the AIT and test activities on the space systems.
- regroup the national experts in the space technology fields.
- give the adequate environment for experts to develop future space sub-systems and systems planned in the PSN.
- simulate the national industries in the fields of mechanics, electronics, optics, information technology.

== Program Alsat ==
The "Alsat program " is a constellation of Algerian Earth observation satellites operated by the Algerian Space Agency. Algeria has three operational units and one retired mission.

=== Retired missions ===
==== Alsat-1 ====
Alsat-1 is the first Earth observation satellite of Algeria. Its principal mission is monitoring natural resources. It was a Disaster Monitoring Constellation (DMC) satellite that is developed and coordinated by Surrey Satellite Technology Ltd (SSTL).

The satellite is a 60-centimeter cube, and weighs about 92 kilograms. The imaging system covers the green, red, and the near infrared, at a resolution of 32 meters.

It was placed in orbit by a kosmos-3M launch vehicle from the Russian cosmodrome of Plessetsk, on 28 November 2002. Its orbit is heliosynchronous at an altitude of about 700 kilometers with orbital inclination of 98°.

Its first images were received on December 17, 2002 at the reception stations of the Center of space technics (Centre national des techniques spatiales CNTS) at Arzew, Algeria. Alsat-1 completed its mission on 15 August 2010.

=== Operational missions ===
==== Alsat-2 ====
On February 1, 2006, EADS Astrium announced the signature of a contract for the realisation of two (02) satellites (Alsat-2A et Alsat-2B) of the Alsat-2 Program. The Alsat-2 program includes also the establishment of two ground control segments and an image terminal to control and pilot the satellites from Algerian territory.

===== Alsat-2A =====
Alsat-2A is a high resolution Earth observation satellite that was integrated and tested in France at the d'EADS Astrium workshops with participation of 29 Algerian engineers. It was launched by a Polar Satellite Launch Vehicle on 12 July 2010. With a resolution of 2.5m in panchromatic mode, and of 10m in multispectral mode, it provides satellite images for multiple applications such as topography, agriculture, cartography, and protection of the environment.

====== Characteristics (Alsat-2A) ======
The satellite is based on the Myriade platform of the Centre national d'études spatiales (CNES) and is placed in a polar heliosynchonous orbit.

It has the following characteristics:

- weight at launch:130 kg
- embarked none-volatile memory: 64 Gbit
- payload: Télescope en carbure de silicium
  - panchromatic mode resolution: 2.5m
  - multispectral mode resolution: 10m
  - largeur de la fauchée: 17.5 km.

===== Alsat-2B =====
Alsat-2b is the second high resolution Earth observation satellite and the 2nd unit of the Alsat-2 program launched on 26 September 2016 with a PSLV-C35 rocket.

Alsat-2b was made in Algeria by ASAL, weights about 125 kg. its characteristics and payload are not yet published by the Algerian space agency. Alsat-2B is operational. Images taken by Alsat 2B in multispectral mode (visible and near infra-red) and in panchromatic mode will be invested in important thematic and economic fields such as: urban and agricultural planification of the territory and littoral, cartography, following mega-projects, etc.

==== Alsat-1B ====
Alsat-1B is a medium resolution Earth observation satellite based on the SSTL-100 platform. the satellite weights 110 kg. It was integrated at the center of development of satellites of the Algerian space agency in Oran. its images are used for the management of natural disasters and the protection of the environment.

Alsat-1b was launched on 26 September 2016 by a PSLV-C35 launch vehicle. Alsat-1B is a Disaster Monitoring Constellation (DMC) satellite coordinated by Surrey Satellite Technology Limited (SSTL).

===== Payload (Alsat-1B) =====
The satellite carries:

1- ALITE (Algerian Imager Telescope): delivers medium resolution images of 12m in panchromatic mode and 24m in multispectral mode.

2- radiation monitor: permits a better understanding of the environment of radiation that satellites circulating in low Earth orbit are exposed to.

===== Program objectives (Alsat-1B) =====
- know-how technology transfer:
  - training 18 Algerian engineers
  - Algerian led program activities
  - Spacecraft AIT performed by Algerian engineers at Center of Development of Satellites (CDS)

===== Mission Characteristics (Alsat-1B) =====
- Orbit: 700 km, heliosynchronous
- Lifetime (minimum): 5 years
- Ground sampling distance:
  - 12 m panchromatic
  - 24 m multispectral nominal (blue, green, red and Nir)
  - 12 m Multispectral enhanced
- Swath: 150 km
- Signal to noise ratio (SNR: PAN>=100, MS >=100)
- Modulation transfer function (MTF) PAN >=0.1, MS>=0.3)
- Imaging Capability: 40 scenes per day (Standard mode)

=== Scientific research ===
==== Alsat-1N ====
Alsat-1N or Alsat-Nano is a 3U technology demonstration nano-satellite, weight of 3.5 kg.built by an Algerian-British team in application of the cooperation agreement signed between the Algerian Space Agency and the l'UK Space Agency. 18 Algerian engineers used the satellite as a pedagogical tool during their graduation research at Surray University.

the main mission objectives are test of three innovative components: camera, fin solar films and a measure of radiation. Data obtained by the satellite will be studied by Algerian and British researchers. Alsat-1N was launched on September 26, 2016 by an ISRO PSLV

===== Alsat-1N characteristics =====
- Form faction: Cubsat 3U.
- Dimensions: 100*100*140mm.
- Mass: 3.470 kg.
- Orbit: Sun-Synchronous.
- Altitude:670 km.
- Inclination: 98.16°.
- Communication: VHF uplink UHF downlink.
- Attitude control: Three-axis magnetorquer and one reaction wheel (Y-Thomson).

===== Payload (Alsat-1N) =====
Three scientific and technology demonstration payloads:

- Thin film solar cells (TFSC): 4 Solar cells.
- Compact CMOS camera demonstration 2G (C3D2): Including 3 Cameras, 2 Wild field imagers and 1 Narrow field imager.
- Astrotube boom tm: Deployable and retractable boom incorporating a RADFTET and a magnetometer.

== Program Alcomsat ==
Is a telecommunications satellites program.

=== Alcomsat-1 ===
Alcomsat-1 was launched on Dec. 11, 2017 by LM-3B from Xichang Satellite Center. After several maneuvers, it reached the orbital location of 24.8°W. Following the IOAR which was accomplished after the in-orbit test, ASAL confirmed that the in-orbit delivery occurred on March 1.

The Alcomsat-1 is the ninth telecommunication satellite delivered to the international client by China Aerospace; it is also the first cooperation with Algeria in aerospace industry.

The Alcomsat-1 satellite program is the first communications satellite program of Algeria. It covers the Algerian territory and the surrounding area, will be mainly used in the fields of broadcast, emergency communications, remote education, e-government, enterprise communications, satellite broadband, and satellite based augmentation system application, etc.

== Planned missions ==
Alsat-3 and Alsat-4 are also planned to cover national needs.

== Notable achievements ==
The Algerian Space Agency in charge of the National Space Program of Algeria is now capable of:

- Design and implementation of an Earth observation satellite.
- Assembly, integration, and tests of its satellites at its Center of Development of Satellites (CDS) in Oran.
- Conducting orbital manoeuvres and tests in orbit of its satellites autonomously (both Alsat-1B and Alsat-2b were handled by ASAL autonomously after their first signals few moments after separation from the launch vehicle).
- Treatment and analyses of products images obtained by its satellites at its Center of Space Techniques (CST).

== See also ==
- Algerian Space Agency
- Polar Satellite Launch Vehicle
