= EgyptSat-A =

Egyptian space satellite

- Mission type: Earth observation satellite
- Operator: NARSS
- COSPAR ID: 2019-008A
- SATCAT no.: 44047
- Website: www.narss.sci.eg
- Mission duration: Planned: 11 years

Spacecraft properties
- Bus: 559GK
- Manufacturer: RKK Energia

Start of mission
- Launch date: February 21, 2019, 16:47 UTC
- Rocket: Soyuz-2.1b Fregat-M
- Launch site: Baikonur 31/6
- Contractor: Roscosmos

Orbital parameters
- Reference system: Geocentric
- Regime: Sun-Synchronous
- Altitude: 668 kilometres (415 mi)

Main telescope
- Name: Multispectral imager (MSI)
- Resolution: 1 metre (3 ft 3 in) (Pan); 4 metres (13 ft) (MS)

EgyptSat-A, or MisrSat A, was Egypt's third Earth observation satellite, following the launch of EgyptSat 1 in 2007 and EgyptSat 2 in 2014. This satellite was built by the Egyptian National Authority for Remote Sensing and Space Sciences jointly with Russian RKK Energia while the imaging payload was developed by OAO Peleng and NIRUP Geoinformatsionnye Sistemy in Belarus.

== See also ==
- EgyptSat 1
- EgyptSat 2
