= Cartosat-2B =

Indian earth observation satellite

- Names: CartoSat-2B
- Mission type: Earth observation
- Operator: NTRO
- COSPAR ID: 2010-035A
- SATCAT no.: 36795
- Website: https://www.isro.gov.in/
- Mission duration: 5 years (planned); 15 years, 4 months and 27 days (in progress)

Spacecraft properties
- Spacecraft: CartoSat-2B
- Bus: IRS-2
- Manufacturer: ISRO
- Launch mass: 694 kg (1,530 lb)
- Dry mass: 630 kg (1,390 lb)
- Power: 930 watts

Start of mission
- Launch date: 12 July 2010, 03:52 UTC
- Rocket: Polar Satellite Launch Vehicle, (PSLV-C15)
- Launch site: Satish Dhawan Space Centre, First Launch Pad (FLP)
- Contractor: Indian Space Research Organisation
- Entered service: October 2010

Orbital parameters
- Reference system: Geocentric orbit
- Regime: Sun-synchronous orbit
- Perigee altitude: 623 km (387 mi)
- Apogee altitude: 644 km (400 mi)
- Inclination: 97.92°
- Period: 94.72 minutes

Instruments
- Panchromatic Camera (PAN)

Cartosat-2B is an Earth observation satellite in a Sun-synchronous orbit and the fourth of the Cartosat series of satellites. The satellite is the seventeenth satellite in the Indian Remote Sensing (IRS) satellite series to be built by the Indian Space Research Organisation (ISRO).

== Instrument ==
The satellite carries a panchromatic camera (PAN) capable of taking black-and-white pictures in the visible region of electromagnetic spectrum. The highly agile Cartosat-2B can be steered up to 26° along as well as across the direction of its movement to facilitate imaging of any area more frequently. Very-high-resolution land imagery.

== Launch ==
It was launched along with the 116 kg Algerian satellite Alsat-2A, one nanosatellite each from Canada (AISSat-1) and Switzerland (TIsat-1), and STUDSAT-1, an Indian picosatellite, on 12 July 2010, at 03:52 UTC in a Polar Satellite Launch Vehicle (PSLV-C15) launch vehicle from the spaceport at Sriharikota.

== See also ==
- List of Indian satellites
