= Tidiane Ouattara =

Tidiane Ouattara is an Ivorian space scientist.

== Early life and education ==
Tidiane Ouattara
- Education: Sherbrooke University
- Occupation: Space scientist
- Years active: 1996–present

Ouattara was born in the Ivory Coast. He holds a master's degree in physical geography from Université de Cocody-Abidjan. Later, he moved to Canada and attended Sherbrooke University, where he earned a master's degree in 1996 and a PhD in remote sensing and geographical information system (GIS) in 2001.

== Career ==
From 1996 to 2001, Ouattara worked as a faculty member at Sherbrooke University, teaching scientific disciplines, African geopolitics, and sociocultural issues. He then briefly worked in Montreal's private sector before joining the Canadian federal government in 2002.

Between 2004 and 2006, while at the Canadian Space Agency, Ouattara served as an advisor to the president of the Canadian Space Agency. He oversaw earth observation, navigation and positioning, robotics, and space sciences, with a regional focus on Africa, Central and South America, and the United Nations. He also led the Canadian Delegation at the United Nations Committee on the Peaceful Uses of Outer Space (UNCOPUOS).

Ouattara joined the department of Natural Resources Canada in 2006, where he worked until 2010. He had previously worked at the same organization from 2002 to 2004. During these periods, he held roles such as science and policy advisor of the Canadian Digital Elevation Model Programme, and researcher in geomatics.

From 2010 to 2016, Ouattara worked at the Department of Environment Canada. He managed the Geospatial Data Management Section and headed the Landscape and Ecosystem Assessment Planning and Coordination Section in the Canadian Wildlife Service.

Since 2016, Ouattara has been with the African Union Commission as a space expert scientist for the African Outer Space Programme and as the Coordinator of the Global Monitoring for Environment and Security (GMES & Africa) Programme. His work involves international relations, research and development, strategic policy development, and program management in environment, natural resources, and science and technology sectors.

Ouattara also serves as the president of the Association of Ivorians of Ethiopia. In 2023 he was serving at the African Union Commission as the Space Expert and Coordinator for the African Outer Space Programme, leading the implementation of the African Space Policy and Strategy and the establishment and operationalisation of the African Space Agency.
