= National Authority for Remote Sensing and Space Sciences =

Egyptian space institution

NARSS
- National Authority for Remote Sensing and Space Sciences
- الهيئة القومية للاستشعار من البعد وعلوم الفضاء
- Abbreviation: NARSS
- Predecessor: Egyptian Space Program (1960–1967)
- Successor: Egyptian Space Agency
- Formation: 1973
- Type: Space agency
- Headquarters: Cairo
- Location: Egypt
- Coordinates: 30.12949°N 31.38166°E

National Authority for Remote Sensing and Space Sciences (NARSS; Arabic: الهيئة القومية للاستشعار من البعد وعلوم الفضاء, romanized: al-Hayʼah al-Qawmīyah lil-Istishʻār min al-Buʻd wa-ʻUlūm al-Faḍāʼ) is the pioneering Egyptian institution in the field of satellite remote sensing and space sciences, established in 1973.

== History ==
NARSS is an outgrowth of Egyptian Remote Sensing Center, established in 1973 as an American-Egyptian joint project were affiliated with the Egyptian Academy of Scientific Research and Technology. In 1994 the authority was established as an organization under the State Ministry of Scientific Research to promote the use of state of the art space technology for the development of the country and introducing High Tech capabilities to regional planning and other applications.

== Activities ==
The sector of remote sensing works on the use of data provided by earth observation satellites and airborne sensors to produce maps and spatial data for the evaluation and monitoring of natural resources, natural hazards and environmental management.

The sector of space sciences is concerned with the development of sensors for earth observation to be mounted on satellites and with all the problems involved with monitoring communication with satellites and retrieving the information for processing, and ultimately on launching a French remote sensing satellite.

== Facilities ==
Both the headquarters and the New Cairo space control station are located in Cairo. The receiving station is located in Aswan.

== Satellites ==
EgyptSat 1 was a remote sensing satellite that was launched on 17 April 2007 at Baikonur Cosmodrome. Control and communication was lost July 2010.The satellite weighed 100 kg and contained a multi-spectral imager for Earth observations.

EgyptSat 2 was an imaging satellite built by RSC Energia that launched on 16 April 2014 at Baikonur Cosmodrome. The satellite was lost in April 2015 when a dual failure in the flight control system occurred.

EgyptSat-A is a replacement imaging satellite launched on 21 February 2019 at Baikonur Cosmodrome, paid for by insurance for the loss of EgyptSat 2.

== Egyptian Space Program ==
The Egyptian space program started in the 1950s but it was not until the establishment of the Egyptian Space Council in 1998 and approval of a year later of the Egyptian Space Program within the National Authority of Remote Sensing and Space Sciences.

- Enabling Egypt to join the Space Technology Age through designing and manufacturing of small research and remote sensing satellites, acquiring technological knowledge and capabilities, and building required infrastructure to achieve self-capability to design & manufactures small satellites
- Transfer of advanced space technologies in communication, computers, programs, optics, sensors, new materials, command and control and energy to the Egyptian Scientific community.
- Drive innovation in earth observations and space sciences
- Utilizing of space technologies & applications in development plans.
- Acquiring national capabilities in Space Technology disciplines.
- Establishment of scientific & industrial base in advanced technology fields.
- Building human resource capabilities for space sciences fields.
- Coordinating and enhancing the cooperation between the research & industrial centers and space program through a national project
- To establish a scientific and technological base for space and high technology industries in Egypt and the development of the relevant human capacity and improve local stakeholders in remote sensing applications.
- To support decision makers in sustainable development by providing space images.

== See also ==
- List of government space agencies
