= EgyptSat 2 =

Egyptian space satellite

- Mission type: Remote sensing
- Operator: NARSS
- COSPAR ID: 2014-021A
- SATCAT no.: 39678
- Website: www.narss.sci.eg
- Mission duration: Planned: 11 years Final: 363 days

Spacecraft properties
- Bus: 559GK
- Manufacturer: RSC Energia
- Launch mass: 1,050 kilograms (2,310 lb)
- Power: 3000 watts

Start of mission
- Launch date: April 16, 2014, 16:20 UTC
- Rocket: Soyuz-U
- Launch site: Baikonur 31/6

End of mission
- Last contact: April 14, 2015

Orbital parameters
- Regime: LEO
- Perigee altitude: 436 kilometres (271 mi)
- Apogee altitude: 703 kilometres (437 mi)
- Inclination: 51.6 degrees
- Period: 96.05 min
- Epoch: 17 April 2014, 04:55 UTC

Main
- Name: EgyptSat 2
- Resolution: 1 metre (3 ft 3 in) (Pan); 4 metres (13 ft) (MS)

EgyptSat 2 was Egypt's second remote sensing Earth observation satellite. It was built by the Russian RSC Energia and the Egyptian NARSS while the incorporated cameras and payload was developed by OAO Peleng and NIRUP Geoinformatsionnye Sistemy in Belarus.

A frameless spacecraft had been utilized in EgyptSat 2; it was an innovative technology being first time used in Russia.

EgyptSat 2 was launched on board a Soyuz-U rocket on 16 April 2014 from the Baikonur Cosmodrome which was a milestone toward establishing the Egyptian Space Agency.

== History ==
EgyptSat 2 was planned to be launched on October 1, 2013, but the launch was put on hold in 2011 following all contact being lost with EgyptSat 1 due to a failure of its S-Band communication system.

== Overview ==
In 2007, Egypt made its first attempt to launch a high-resolution surveillance satellite launching the Ukrainian-made EgyptSat 1, but the satellite failed prematurely after 3 years. However, Egypt continued working with Yuzhnoye Design Bureau for the next project, until it received a bid from Russia to supply a state-of-the-art "eye in the sky". Negotiations lasted for more than four years until Egypt awarded the contract to Russia for the development of a high-resolution imaging satellite.

The project was handled by RKK Energia based on Korolev on the behalf of Russia, codenamed "E-Star". 60 percent of the satellite's hardware was made by Egypt. Russia also trained Egyptian engineers to control the satellite from a ground station near Cairo. The cost of the project was rumored to be around 40 million dollar fully funded by the Egyptian Armed Forces.

The spacecraft was shipped to Baikonur in February 2014 and was launched on April 16, 2014.

EgyptSat 2 was launched into an orbit inclined 51.6 degrees toward the Equator which means it was only covering areas between 51.6 latitude North in the Northern Hemisphere and 51.6 degrees South latitude in the Southern Hemisphere, which covered the Egyptian territory, but did not cover vast regions of the planet in both hemispheres.

== Description ==
EgyptSat 2 was a hexagonal satellite, equipped with three deployable, fixed solar arrays and nickel-hydrogen batteries, and its optical imaging payload covered the visible and infrared spectral bands, providing a ground resolution of 13.1 feet (four meters) for multispectral imagery and 3.3 feet (one meter) for panchromatic imagery. The satellite's coverage included total coverage of Egypt's land and maritime territory and their environs.

A new and revolutionary technology had been demonstrated first time, as EgyptSat 2 became the first frameless spacecraft created in Russia and the first satellite created by such technology in the history of Russian cosmonautics. The frameless base technology reduces the final assembly of the satellite from six months with several trained professionals and special equipment, to 10 minutes with only two experts, which in turn minimizes effort, time and costs while not compromising the quality of the final product.

== Mission ==
The satellite was supposed to supply the Egyptian government with high-resolution views of Earth for environmental, scientific and military applications. Data was transmitted through an X-band communications terminal at a rate of 300-600 Mbit/s to ground stations located near Cairo and Aswan.

According to Tal Dekel, a research fellow at Tel Aviv University's Yuval Ne'eman Workshop for Science, Technology and Security, few were aware of the extent of Egypt's satellite program and the satellite was disguised as scientific research but in truth it would be used by the Egyptian Armed Forces as a spying satellite.

EgyptSat 2 acquired its first images on April 30, that released by RSC Energia showing Taylor Bay and Melbourne, Australia.

EgyptSat 2 circularised its orbit at about 720 kilometers height using an electric propulsion system. The operation completed in August 2014.

The total cost of the mission was about $40 million.

== Assumed lost and end of mission ==
On April 14, 2015, the EgyptSat 2 was unresponsive to commands from the Earth and control over the satellite was lost due to a human factor as the main possible cause according to the Russian Izvestiya newspaper, citing a source in the RSC Energia. While the National Authority for Remote Sensing and Space Sciences (NARSS) insisted that EgyptSat 2 is still recoverable, as the head of NARSS Medhat Mokhtar said, "What was reported about is in fact a regular technical failure. It happens every now and then to all the satellites. The problem will be fixed in the next few hours," explaining that, "any failure in control of satellite begins with absence of response to commands from Earth, and the low battery could be the problem, but it will be fixed and control will be fully restored."

EgyptSat 2 has experienced few problems since December 2014, as it lost some of the battery capacity, also on mid-April 2015, EgyptSat 2 had an attitude control issues, then a failure of the primary and backup computer of the satellite had occurred within 15 seconds of each other and no official information was released by the satellite's operator or manufacturer.

Insurance payout from the loss largely paid for the manufacture and launch in February 2019 of the EgyptSat-A replacement satellite.

== See also ==
External media

Images
- EgyptSat 2 satellite with Soyuz-U rocket Russia launches spy satellite for Egypt. russianspaceweb. 2014.

Video
- Transportation of Soyuz-U rocket with EgyptSat 2 to the launch pad and final preparations Вывоз РКН Союз-У с КА EgyptSat 2 [Removal of the Soyuz-U space rocket with spacecraft EgyptSat 2]. Телестудия Роскосмоса. 2014.
- Launch of Soyuz-U rocket with EgyptSat 2 on-board Пуск РКН Союз-У с КА EgyptSat 2 [Start of the Soyuz-U space rocket with spacecraft EgyptSat 2]. Телестудия Роскосмоса. 2014.

- EgyptSat 1
- National Authority for Remote Sensing and Space Sciences
- Kondor (satellite)
