= Kuntunse =

Effiduase
- Urban area
- Location within Ghana
- Coordinates: 5°44′28″N 0°18′25″W
- Country: Ghana
- Region: Eastern Region
- Time zone: GMT
  - Summer (DST): GMT

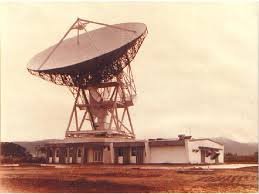
Ghana satellite earth station

Kuntunse is a town near Accra noted for Ghana Space Science and Technology Centre's site for the earth satellite in Ghana. The satellite station was commissioned on 12 August 1981. On 3 July 2008 Ghana Vodafone took over, holding a 70% of shares of the station.

== Location ==
Kuntunse is on the Nsawam stretch of the main Accra-Kumasi highway.

== Land ==
The satellite station land, situated at Kuntunse in Accra, has faced a critical threat from encroaching settlements. After its commissioning in 1981, the station has been gradually overrun, reducing its operational area from 165 acres to just 30 acres.
