= SANSA Space Science =

Research and development center and SANSA field center in Pretoria, South Africa

South African National Space Agency Space Science Directorate
- Alternative names: Hermanus Magnetic Observatory (HMO)
- Location: Hermanus, South Africa
- Coordinates: 34°25′27″S 19°13′26″E
- Established: 1941; 84 years ago

SANSA Space Science, previously the Hermanus Magnetic Observatory (HMO) is South Africa's national geomagnetic research facility. The observatory is situated in the town of Hermanus (Overstrand Local Municipality) in the Western Cape Province and forms part of the South African National Space Agency.

The observatory is an active participant in the International Real-time Magnetic Observatory Network, one of a large number magnetic observatories which monitor and model variations of the Earth's magnetic field.

The HMO consists of four operational groups:

- Space Physics
- Geomagnetism
- Technology
- Science Outreach

Since 1957 the observatory has been operating neutron monitors. Currently this is being done on behalf of the North-West University and consists of 12 Chalk River neutron counter tubes.

== See also ==
- Earth's magnetic field
