= Algerian Space Agency =

Agency in charge of the Algerian space program

Coordinates: 36°47′24″N 3°1′4″E

- (in French) Agence spatiale algérienne (in Arabic) الوكالة الفضائية الجزائرية (in Berber languages) Tafullut Tadzayrit n Tallunt

ASAL overview
- Formed: January 16, 2002; 24 years ago
- Headquarters: 14 rue Omar Aissaoui El Hammadia, Bouzareah Algiers
- ASAL executive: Azzedine Oussedik
- Website: www.asal.dz

Standard Arabic
- Abjad: الوكالة الفضائية الجزائرية
- Romanization: Al-Wakāla al-Faḍā’iyya al-Jazā’iriyya

Tamazight
- Tifinagh: ⵜⴰⴼⵓⵍⵍⵓⵜ ⵜⴰⴷⵣⴰⵢⵔⵉⵜ ⵏ ⵜⴰⵍⵍⵓⵏⵜ
- Latin: Tafullut Tadzayrit n Tallunt

French
- French: Agence spatiale algérienne

The Algerian Space Agency (ASAL; French: Agence spatiale algérienne, Arabic: الوكالة الفضائية الجزائرية, romanized: Al-Wakāla al-Faḍā’iyya al-Jazā’iriyya) was established on January 16, 2002 in Bouzareah, Algiers. The agency is in charge of the Algerian space program, and has flown five different satellites.

== Objectives ==
The Algerian Space Agency wants to:

- Propose to the Government the elements of a national strategy in the field of space activity and ensure their implementation
- Establish a space infrastructure to strengthen national capacities
- Implement the annual and multi annual programs to develop national space activities related to the various sectors concerned and to ensure the monitoring and evaluation
- Propose to the Government best suited to national concerns and provide space systems, on behalf of the state, their design, implementation and operation
- Provide the Government a policy of bilateral and multilateral cooperation geared to national needs
- Monitoring and evaluation of the commitments arising from the obligations of the state in regional and international agreements in the fields of space activity

== Composition ==
The Algerian Space Agency consists of a central structure and four operational entities: Center of Space Techniques, Space Applications Center, Satellite Development Center, and Telecommunications Systems Operating Center.

== International cooperation ==
In order to achieve the objectives set out under the National Space Program, the Algerian Space Agency has carried out bilateral and multilateral cooperation actions with space forces on the one hand and emerging countries on the other And developing countries.

=== Bilateral cooperation ===
Regarding bilateral cooperation, the Algerian Space Agency signed:

- Government cooperation agreements signed with China (in 2016) Argentina (CONAE), France (CNES), and Ukraine (NSAU);
- A non-government cooperation agreement signed with UK based Wisscom Aerospace in March 2018;
- Memorandums of Understanding and Cooperation with space agencies of Russia (Roscosmos), China (CNSA) (in 2007), the United Kingdom (UK Space Agency), Germany (DLR), India (ISRO), Syria (GORS) and Argentina (CONAE).

=== Multilateral cooperation ===
Concerning multilateral cooperation, the Algerian Space Agency has undertaken the following actions:

==== Under the United Nations ====
Since the accession of Algeria to the Committee on the Pacific Uses of the Outer Space (COPUOS) of the Nations in 2002, Algeria has ratified three agreements, namely the Atmospheric Space Treaty, the Space Liability Convention and the Registration Convention.

As such, the Algerian space agency actively participates regularly in the activities initiated by the United Nations Office of Space Affairs, notably through:

- The presidency of the Scientific and Technical Committee under a framework of the Agency during the biennium 2008–2009;
- The signing of a cooperation agreement between the Algerian Space Agency and the Office for Outer Space Affairs (UN-BAS) for the establishment in Algeria of the United Nations regional support office for disaster management And emergency response on the basis of the UN-SPIDER space tool to cover the North African sub-region.
- The organization in Algiers international seminars in collaboration with the UN-DOWN:
  - The use of space technologies for the prevention and management of natural disasters" in May 2005;
  - International Space Law and National Legislation" in March 2006;

Climate Change and Adaptation in Africa - The Role of Space Technologies in October 2007.

The Algerian Space Agency also participates, on behalf of Algeria, in the various subsidiary organs of the United Nations, including the Board of Directors of the African Regional Center for Science Technologies in the Space of Nations (CRASTE).

It is in this capacity that the agency was designated for the organization of the 5th session of the Board of Directors of the Center held on 26 June 2012 in Algiers.

==== In the African context ====
Algeria, represented by the Algerian space agency, is invited to all conferences and debates around the use of space technologies for sustainable development. It is as the agency:

- To participate in the four African Conference on Space Science and Technology in 2005 in Abuja (Nigeria) in 2007 in Cape Town (South Africa), in 2009 in Algiers (Algeria) and in 2011 in Mombasa (Kenya), as well as At the 62nd International Astronautical Congress in 2011 in South Africa where she contributed to the animation of two African Space Leaders Round Table and From Space to Earth Challenges and Opportunities.
- To organized the 3rd African Conference on Space Science and Technology for Sustainable Development 7 to 9 December 2009 in Algiers.

Algeria, South Africa and Nigeria initiated in 2004, on the sidelines of the work of the Committee on the Peaceful Uses of Outer Space (COPUOS) in Vienna, a constellation of satellite observation satellites (ARMC), which culminated in the signing of the ARMC agreement between Algeria, South Africa, Kenya and Nigeria, on 7 December 2009 in Algiers.

This constellation project aims to contribute to the knowledge and the rational management of the resources essential to the consolidation of the process of development and the fight against poverty initiated through the NEPAD through the daily coverage in images and the provision of services at a lower cost In a very short time.

==== In the framework of the Arab league ====
At the initiative of Algeria, a project for the construction of an Earth Observation Satellite (ASEO) was approved at the 17th Summit of Arab Heads of State held in Algiers in March 2005. Since its launch, this project has been the subject of several stages of discussions and validation as well technical as political and institutional.

== National Space Program ==
Adopted by the Algerian Government on November 28, 2006, and spanning 15 years (2006–2020), with a review every 5 years, the National Space Program (NSP) is the reference instrument for space policy: it is an instrument for the government support for sustainable development and strengthening of national sovereignty.

=== NSP Application Action Program ===
Eighty-six (86) projects were selected. They mainly use the use of satellite remote sensing, satellite positioning (GPS, Glonas, Galileo in perspective), space telecommunications services, and Geographic Information Systems (GIS), offering to different national sectors Powerful tools for decision-making. These projects are based on: national competences; space systems, national and international image providers and operational entities within the Algerian Space Agency.

== Satellites ==
Alsat-1 is the first of a series of 05 microsatellite launched under the DMC (Disaster Monitoring Constellation) for the time period of 2002–2005. The objective of the mission is to provide medium resolution multispectral images for monitoring natural disasters as well as other thematic remote sensing applications.

Alsat-1B is a satellite designed for agricultural and disaster monitoring. It was launched on the Indian ISRO PSLV-C35 mission on Monday, September 26, 2016.

Alsat-2A was successfully launched from the Sriharikota site near Chennai (South-East of India) on 12 July 2010, as an Algerian Earth observation satellite. Since its launch, Alsat-2A has provided nearly 30,000 images.

Alsat-2B is similar to Alsat-2A, but integrated in Algeria within the small satellite development center (UDPS) in Oran.

Alsat-1N contains amateur radio payloads and was launched on the Indian ISRO PSLV-C35 mission at 0342 GMT on Monday, September 26, 2016.

Alcomsat-1 : is the first Algerian communication satellite, it was successfully launched 10 December 2017, carried by Chinese launcher Long March 3B, from the Xichang Satellite Launch Center. Algeria controls its in-orbit operation, management, and applications from Algerian ground stations. The satellite provides broadcasting, emergency communications, remote education, and satellite broadband.

Alsat-3A: is a next-generation Earth observation satellite designed for very high-resolution imaging, land planning, and disaster preparedness. Developed in partnership with China, it was successfully launched on a Long March 2C rocket from the Jiuquan Satellite Launch Center on January 15, 2026.

== See also ==
- List of government space agencies
- National Space Program (Algeria)
