= Alsat-2A =

Algerian earth observation satellite

- Mission type: Earth observation
- Operator: CNTS
- COSPAR ID: 2010-035D
- SATCAT no.: 36798

Spacecraft properties
- Manufacturer: Airbus Defence and Space
- Launch mass: 117 kilograms (258 lb)

Start of mission
- Launch date: 12 July 2010, 03.52:00 UTC
- Rocket: PSLV-C15
- Launch site: Sriharikota

Orbital parameters
- Regime: Sun synchronous
- Periapsis altitude: 680.6 kilometres (422.9 mi)
- Apoapsis altitude: 678.6 kilometres (421.7 mi)
- Inclination: 98.1º degrees
- Period: 98.2 min

Alsat-2A is an Algerian satellite operated by the Algerian Space Agency for cartography, management of agriculture, forestry, water, mineral and oil resources. The satellite weighs 117 kilograms (258 lb) and carries an Earth optical payload.

The satellite was launched on 12 July 2010 by ISRO using the PSLV-C15 rocket.

== Structure ==
Alsat-2A is the successor of Alsat-1, which was launched on 28 November 2002. The satellite is intended to aid in cartography; gain information for agriculture, forestry and water management; facilitate the search for mineral resources; the planning of land use; and help in disaster response. NAOMI (New Astrosat Observation Modular Instrument) is a telescope installed on the spacecraft, with a 200 mm (7.9 in) diameter mirror that has a resolution of 2.5 meters (8.2 ft) panchromatic and 9.1 meters (10 yd) in four different spectral regions. The swath width of the telescope is 17.5 km (10.9 mi), and the satellite flies over the same spot approximately every three days. The telescope can hold up to 35° outside the orbital plane images. Data transmission occurs in the X- and S-band. The power supply accepts a solar cell of two elements, which provides a maximum of 175 watts of electrical power for the operation of satellite systems and by lithium ion batteries with a total capacity of 15 ampere-hours is supported. The projected lifetime of the satellite is five years. For trajectory correction maneuvers, the satellite uses its hydrazine thrusters, of which it has 4.5 kg (9.9 lb) propellant for its lifetime. The stabilization is achieved by using star and Sun sensors, reaction wheels, gyroscopes and GPS.

== Start ==
The launch took place on 12 July 2010 at 05:52 CEST with four other satellites in the PSLV rocket C15 from the rocket launch site Satish Dhawan Space Centre. The main payload Cartosat-2B was the first satellite to deploy, at 1034 seconds, at an altitude of approximately 637 kilometers (396 mi) above the Earth's surface in a circular Sun-synchronous orbit with an inclination of about 98.1 °. Then Alsat-2A was deployed, followed by the three nano or pico Studsat from India, Aïssat-1 from Norway and TIsat-1 from Switzerland.

== See also ==
- Algeria national space programs
