= Alcomsat-1 =

Algerian communications satellite

- Mission type: Communication
- Operator: Algerian Space Agency (ASAL)
- COSPAR ID: 2017-078A
- SATCAT no.: 43039
- Mission duration: 15 years

Spacecraft properties
- Launch mass: 5,225 kg (11,519 lb)

Start of mission
- Launch date: 23:11, December 10, 2017 (UTC)
- Rocket: Long March 3B
- Launch site: Xichang Satellite Launch Center

Orbital parameters
- Reference system: Geocentric
- Regime: Geostationary
- Longitude: 24.8° west

Transponders
- Band: 20 (24 36 MHz equivalent) IEEE K_{u} band and 6 (13 36 MHz equivalent) IEEE C band transponders
- Frequency: K_{u} band and C band
- Bandwidth: K_{u} band: 864 MHz; C band: 464 MHz

Alcomsat-1 is the first Algerian communications satellite. It was carried by Chinese launcher Long March 3B from the Xichang Satellite Launch Center, located in Sichuan Province, 2,200 km southwest of Beijing.

The satellite was launched on 10 December 2017 and is designed for 15 years operational lifetime. It is a partnership between Algerian Space Agency (ASAL) and China. It is dedicated to telecommunications, television broadcasting and internet.

== Operations ==
The satellite was developed by the Chinese Academy of Space Technology (CAST) and is based on the DFH-4 platform. Its communications payload is composed of 33 operational transponders (19 in Ku band, 12 in Ka band and 2 in L band). The satellite will operate for 15 years on the geosynchronous orbit. Launch mass was around 5,225 kilograms (11,519 lb).

The DFH-4 (DongFangHong-4) platform is a large telecommunications satellite platform of the next generation. It provides high capability in output power and communication capacity ranking with international advanced satellite platforms.

The applications for the DFH-4 platform are not limited to high capacity broadcast communication satellites and it can be used as a tracking and data relay satellite, regional mobile communication satellite, etc.

The platform comprises propulsion module, service module and a solar array system. It has a payload capacity of 588 kg and an output power of 10.5 kW by the end of its lifetime. Its reliability by the end of its lifetime is more than a 0.78 industry ratio.

The platform is equipped with 22 Ku-band transponders (four 54 MHz and eighteen 36 MHz), three receiver antennas, and two transmission antennas.

The DFH-4 can support the transmission of 150~200 TV programs simultaneously to ground users using a 0.45 meter antenna device. The DFH-4 satellite also features strong capabilities against hostile disturbance and jamming. The satellite's power supply includes two 6 meter solar panels.

== Control centers ==
The Alcomsat-1 satellite system is managed by two control and operation centers: the Space Telecommunications Systems Exploitation Center (CESTS) in Bouchaoui – Algiers, and the Space Telecommunications Operations Center (COTS) of Boughezoul – Médéa, which are responsible for monitoring from ground stations, in continuous operation, the state of health of the satellite, and for managing multimedia applications.

== See also ==
- Algeria national space programs
