= Department of Science, Technology and Innovation =

Department of the South African government

- List: 10 other official names: Departement van Wetenskap en Tegnologie (Afrikaans); UmNyango weSayensi neTheknoloji (Southern Ndebele); Isebe leNzululwazi kunye nobuChwepheshe (Xhosa); umnyango weSayensi nobuChwepheshe (Zulu); Litiko leteSayensi neTheknoloji (Swazi); Kgoro ya Saense le Tegnolotši (Northern Sotho); Lefapha la Saense le Theknoloji (Sotho); Kgoro e e mabapi le Saense le Thekenoloji (Tswana); Ndzawulo ya swa Sayense na Theknolojia (Tsonga); Muhasho wa zwa Sainsi na Thekhinolodzhi (Venda)

Department overview
- Formed: 2019; 7 years ago
- Jurisdiction: Government of South Africa
- Headquarters: Brummeria, Pretoria
- Annual budget: R 10.44 billion (2026/27)
- Minister responsible: Blade Nzimande, Minister of Science, Technology and Innovation
- Deputy Minister responsible: Nomalungelo Gina, Deputy Minister of Science, Technology and Innovation
- Department executive: Mlungisi Cele, Director-General: Science, Technology and Innovation
- Website: www.dsti.gov.za

The Department of Science, Technology and Innovation (DSTI; formerly the Department of Science and Innovation) is the South African government department responsible for scientific research, including space programmes. The current Minister is Blade Nzimande.

Much of the department's work is ultimately carried out through various quasi-independent agencies (although still usually government bodies) including:

- the National Research Foundation, which receives a substantial proportion of the DST budget to carry out various research support tasks, including supporting key national research infrastructure ("National Research Facilities"), scientific research grant administration and a student grant scheme;
- the Council for Scientific and Industrial Research, which acts as a quasi-privatised research and development agency with a specific focus on research of application to industry;
- the Technology Innovation Agency, which serves to provide funding to turn innovative research into commercial products;
- the South African National Space Agency, which covers space-related research and development initiatives;
- the Human Sciences Research Council, which focuses its research on human health and disease.
- the South African Centre for Digital Language Resources which creates and manages digital resources and software supporting research and development in digital language resources in South Africa.
