= EgyptSat 1 =

Egyptian space satellite

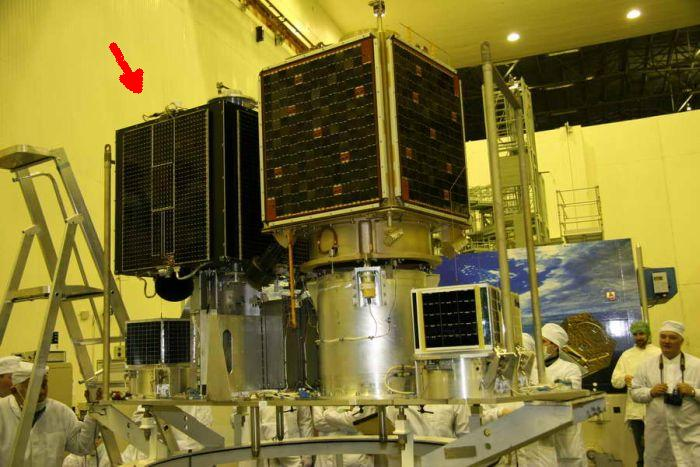
- EgyptSat 1 (left) and Saudi Sat 3 (right)
- Mission type: Remote sensing
- Operator: NARSS
- COSPAR ID: 2007-012A
- SATCAT no.: 31117
- Website: www.narss.sci.eg
- Mission duration: Planned: 5 years; Achieved: 3 years, 3 months, 2 days

Spacecraft properties
- Bus: MS-1TK
- Manufacturer: Yuzhnoye Design Bureau
- Launch mass: 165 kilograms (364 lb)
- Power: 65 watts

Start of mission
- Launch date: April 17, 2007, 07:02 UTC
- Rocket: Dnepr
- Launch site: Baikonur 109/95
- Contractor: ISC Kosmotras

End of mission
- Last contact: July 19, 2010

Orbital parameters
- Reference system: Geocentric
- Regime: Sun-Synchronous
- Perigee altitude: 658 kilometres (409 mi)
- Apogee altitude: 666 kilometres (414 mi)
- Inclination: 98.1 degrees

Main Push broom scanner
- Name: EgyptSat 1
- Resolution: 7.8 metres (26 ft) (MBEI); 39 metres (128 ft) (cross-track) x 46 metres (151 ft) (along-track) (IREI)

EgyptSat 1 or MisrSat-1 was Egypt's first Earth remote sensing satellite. It was built jointly by Egypt's National Authority for Remote Sensing and Space Sciences and the Yuzhnoye Design Bureau in Ukraine and was launched on board a Dnepr rocket on 17 April 2007 from the Baikonur Cosmodrome.

The effort was spearheaded by Dr. Aly Sadek, chairman of the Egyptian Council for Space Science and Technology Research. It in many ways was considered a huge step for the Egyptians since it marked the first time they opted for technology transfer during the manufacturing the satellite rather than simply purchasing one (as was the case with the Nilesat satellites). On 23 October 2010, the National Authority for Remote Sensing and Space Sciences announced that control and communication with the satellite had been lost since July 2010.

== History ==
In 2001, Egypt posted an international tender for the development of the first Egyptian satellite for the observation and remote sensing. Bidders from Ukraine, UK, Russia, Korea and Italy competed for the deal.

On June 26, 2001 KB Yuzhnoe design bureau from Ukraine were announced as the winner and on October 24, a contract was signed in Egypt.

The consortium consisted of KB Yuzhnoe design bureau and sub-contractors Ukrainian companies:

- Yuzhnoye - prime contractor responsible for the platform and the launch
- Yuzhmash - Scientific Research Institute of Radio Engineering Measurements
- Khartron-Konsat and Khartron-Yukom - Research and Scientific Production Enterprises
- KONEX - State Research and Production Enterprise
- CONECS - responsible for the development of the two optical payloads, the onboard payload command and data handling subsystem, as well as for the development of the data processing in the ground segment
- Arsenal - optics manufacturing

=== Achievements and future plans ===
- EgyptSat 1 Launched successfully on April 17, 2007.
- EgyptSat 2 with spatial resolution of 5.4 metres (18 ft) was planned to be launched on October 1, 2013 but the launch was put on hold in 2011 following all contact being lost with EgyptSat 1. EgyptSat 2 launched into orbit 16 April 2014; last contact with the satellite was April 14, 2015.
- DesertSat with spatial resolution of 2.5 metres (8 ft 2 in) which specialized in identifying and monitoring desert resources is planned to be launched in 2017.

The objective of the three satellites is to provide comprehensive images of Egypt.

== Equipment ==
Egyptsat 1 is considered a miniaturized satellite weighing 100 kg and is carrying two devices: an infrared sensing device and a high resolution multispectral imager together with store and forward communications payload.

== See also ==
- EgyptSat 2
- 2007 in spaceflight
- Egyptian Space Program
