= South African National Space Agency =

Space agency of the South African government

South African National Space Agency (SANSA)
- SANSA logo

Agency overview
- Formed: 9 December 2010; 15 years ago
- Type: Space Agency
- Jurisdiction: South African Government
- Headquarters: Pretoria
- Employees: 270 permanent employees; 36 non-permanent employees
- Agency executives: Mr. Humbulani Mudau, CEO; Mr. Patrick Ndlovu, Chairperson of the Board
- Parent department: Department of Science and Innovation
- Website: www.sansa.org.za

The South African National Space Agency (SANSA) is South Africa's government agency responsible for the promotion and development of aeronautics and aerospace space research. It fosters cooperation in space-related activities and research in space science, seeks to advance scientific engineering through human capital, as well as the peaceful use of outer space, and supports the creation of an environment conducive to the industrial development of space technologies within the framework of national government.

SANSA was established on 9 December 2010 by the National Space Agency Act.

Currently, SANSA's main focusses include using data obtained from remote sensing through satellites and other projects to provide assessment on flooding, fires, resource management and environmental phenomena in South Africa and the African continent.

== History ==
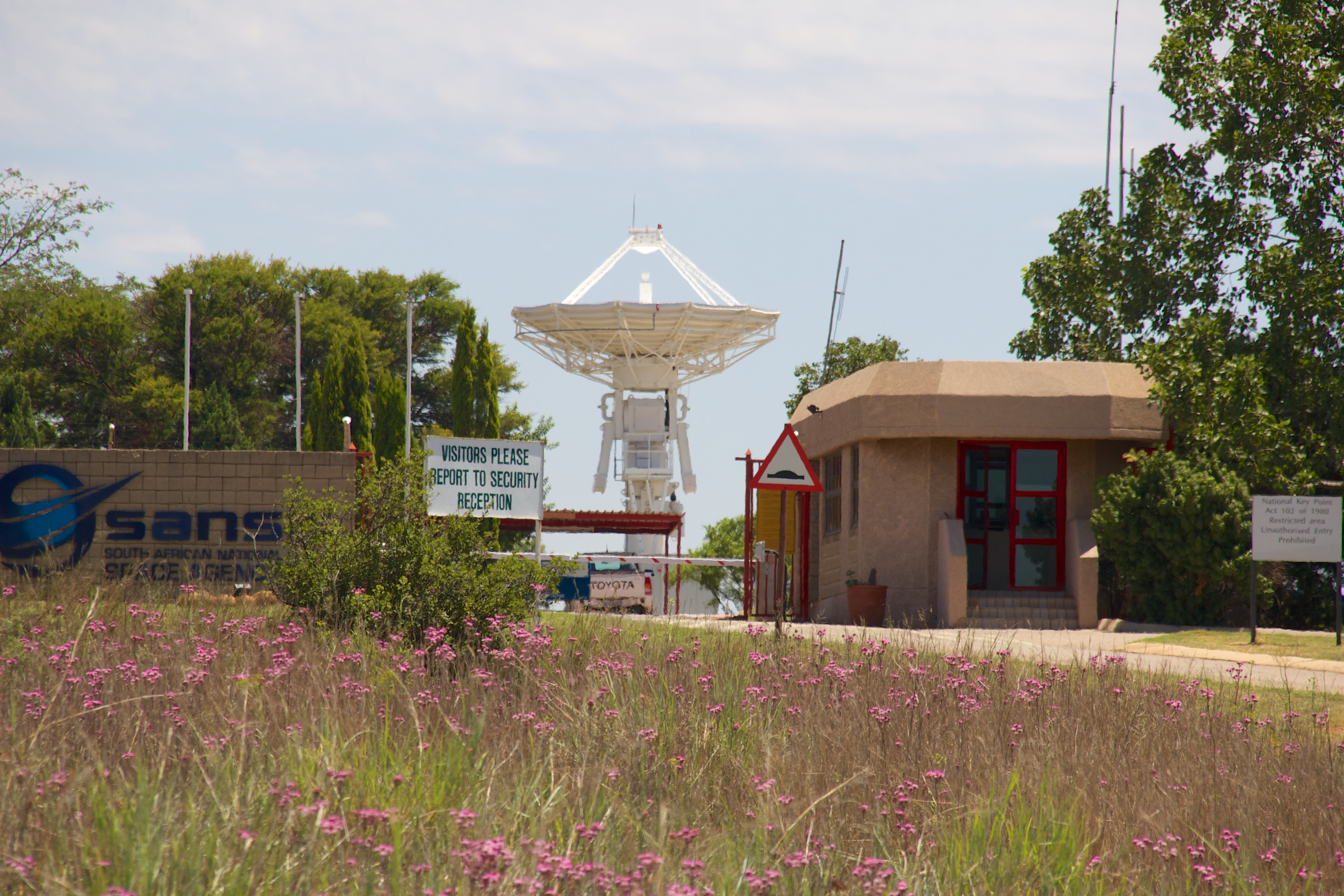
Hartebeesthoek earth station

SANSA was formed after an act of parliament was passed by acting President Kgalema Motlanthe in 2009. The agency was formed with the intent of consolidating space-related research, projects and research in South Africa and to assume the role as a regional centre for space research in Africa.

Throughout the 1950s to 1970s lunar and interplanetary missions conducted by NASA had been supported from a tracking station at Hartebeesthoek where the first images of Mars were received from the Mariner IV spacecraft in the first successful flyby of the planet. Other South African facilities also assisted in tracking satellites to determine the effects of the upper atmosphere on their orbits.

In 1980s work on the development of a launcher and a satellite had been in progress but was discontinued after 1994. In 1999, South Africa launched its first satellite, SUNSAT from Vandenberg Air Force Base in the US. A second satellite, SumbandilaSat, was launched from the Baikonur Cosmodrome in Kazakhstan in 2009.

== Mission ==
SANSA's mission is to use space science and technology to:

- Deliver space-related services and products to the citizens of South Africa and the region.
- Support, guide and conduct research and development in space science and engineering and the practical application of the innovations they generate.
- Stimulate interest in science and develop human capacity in space science and technologies in South Africa.
- Create an environment that promotes industrial development.
- Nurture space-related partnerships to enhance South Africa's standing in the community of nations.

== South African National Earth Observation Strategy ==
SANSA is a key contributor to the South African Earth Observation Strategy (SAEOS), for which the primary objective is "to coordinate the collection, assimilation and dissemination of Earth observation data, so that their full potential to support policy, decision-making, economic growth and sustainable development in South Africa can be realised."

SANSA will provide space-based data platforms that focus on in-situ Earth observation measurements in collaboration with entities such as the South African Environmental Observation Network (SAEON).

== SANSA Space Weather Centre ==
SANSA Space Science is host to the only Space Weather Regional Warning Centre in Africa, which operates as part of the International Space Environment Service (ISES). The Space Weather Centre provides an important service to the nation by monitoring the sun and its activity to provide information, early warnings and forecasts on space weather conditions. The space weather products and services are required primarily for communication and navigation systems, in the defence, aeronautics, navigation and communication sectors.

== See also ==
- National Astrophysics and Space Science Programme (NASSP)
- Aerospace Systems Research Institute (ASRI). South African rocketry research institute
- SAASA, South Africa Amateur Space Administration: The Rocketry Association of SA
- SANSA Space Science
- SEDS, SEDS South Africa, (Students for the Exploration and Development of Space, South Africa), for young Space enthusiasts and professionals in South Africa.
- SumbandilaSat, South African built satellite (also known as ZASAT02)
- SUNSAT, first South African satellite to be launched
- List of aerospace engineering topics
- List of government space agencies
