= Vehicle registration plates of Turkey =

Republic of Türkiye
- Turkish regular legal standard number plate
- Country: Turkey
- Country code: TR

Current series
- Size: 520 mm × 110 mm 20.5 in × 4.3 in
- Serial format: Not standard
- Colour (front): Black on white
- Colour (rear): Black on white

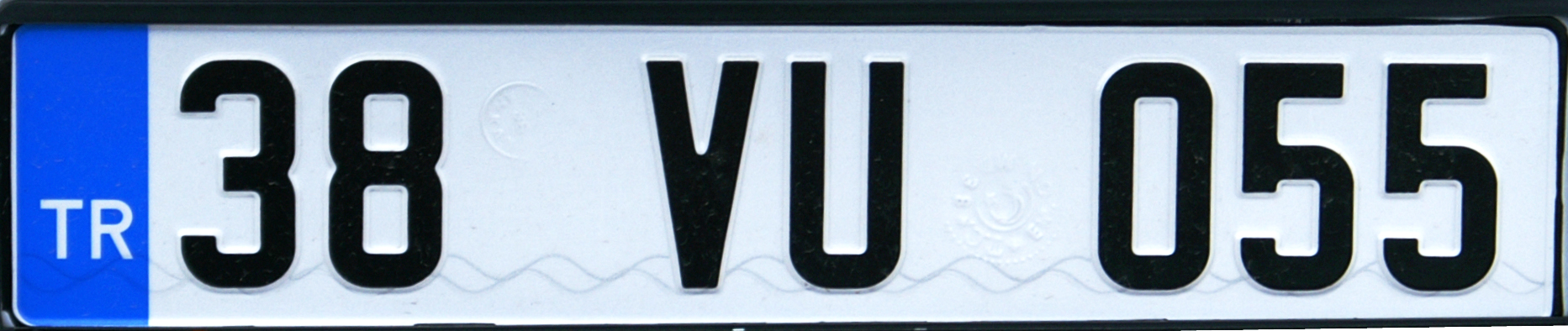
A contemporary Turkish number plate. 38 denotes Kayseri.

Turkish vehicle registration plates are number plates found on Turkish vehicles. The plates use an indirect numbering system associated with the geographical info. In Turkey, number plates are made by authorized private workshops.

== Appearance ==
Turkish number plate is rectangular in shape and made of aluminium. On the left, there is the country code "TR" in a 4×10 cm blue stripe like in EU countries (without the 12 golden stars). The text is in black characters on white background, and for official vehicles white on black. On all vehicles two plates have to be present, being one in front and the other in rear except motorcycles and tractors. The serial letters use the Turkish letters except Ç, Ş, İ, Ö, Ü, Ğ and Latin letters Q, W and X.

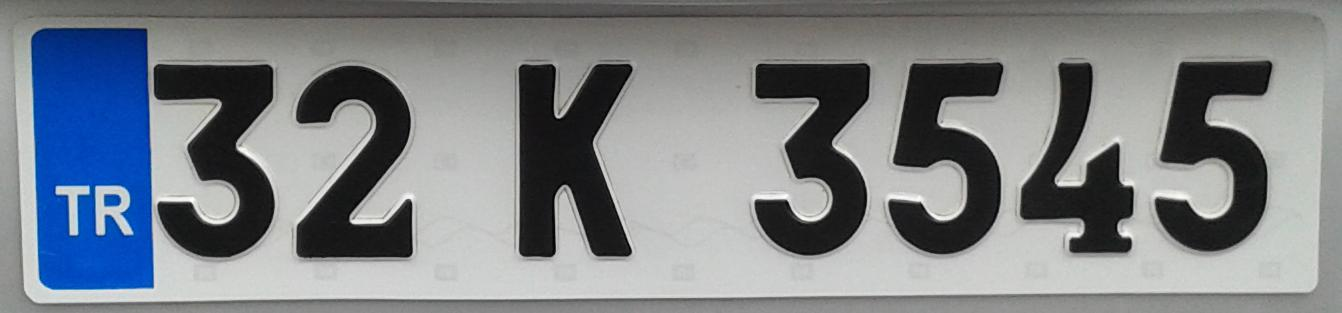
Turkish plates do not utilise a standard font. The font used varies.

=== Dimensions ===
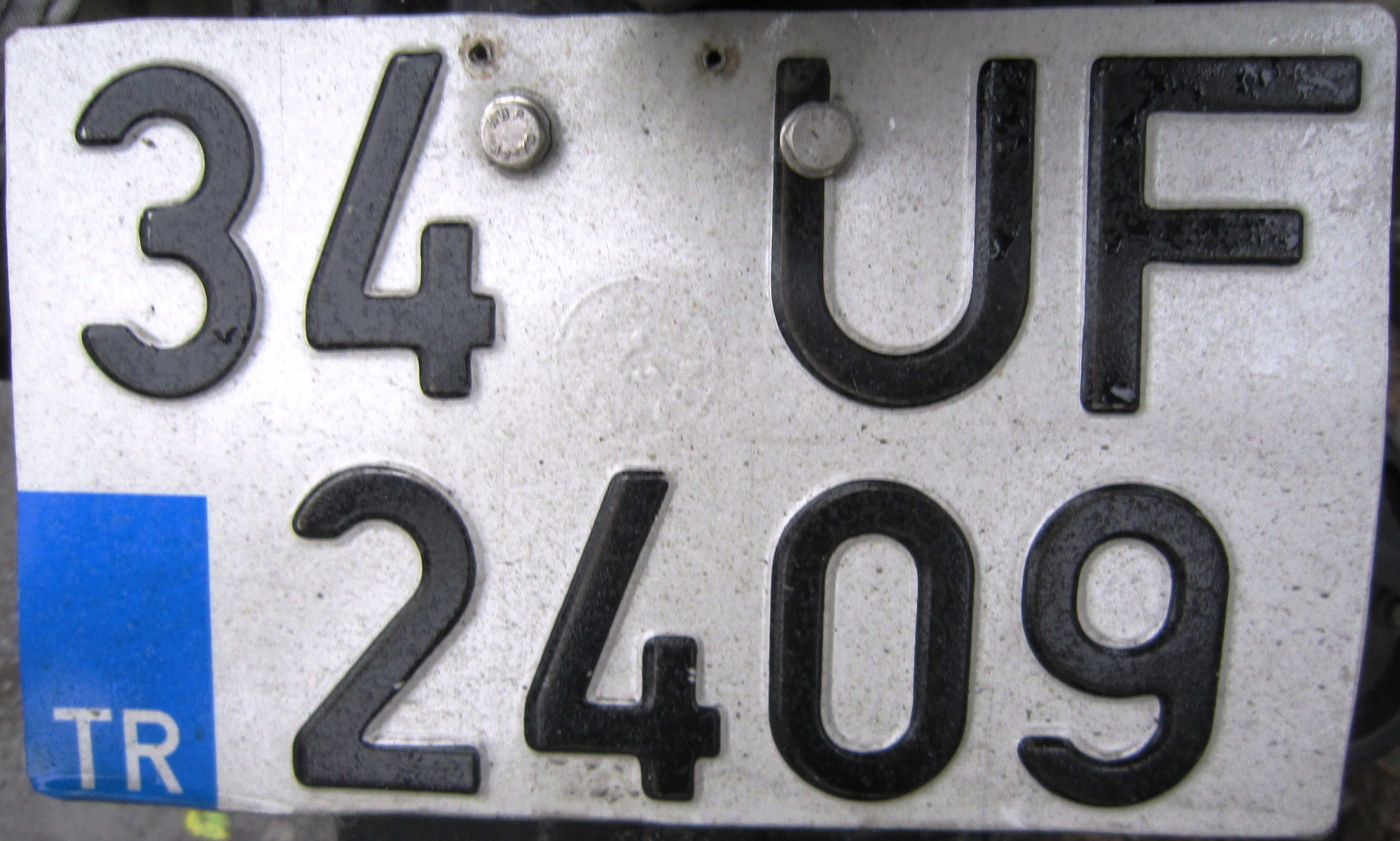
Number plate for motorcycles. 34 denotes Istanbul.

- 150×240 mm in rear only for motorbikes, motorcycles and tractors with rubber wheels,
- 110×520 mm in front and rear for cars, 210×320 mm rear available for off-road vehicles, vans, trucks and busses. The size is 150×300 mm for imported vehicles if the regular plate does not fit.

=== Blue stripe ===
Euroband like blue stripe on the left hand side of the plates

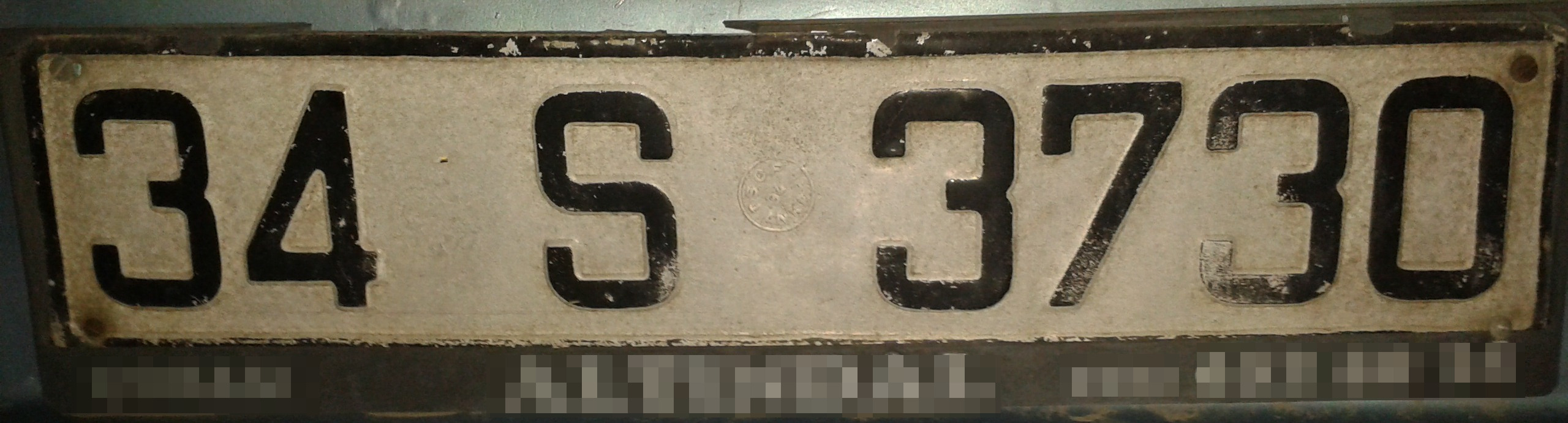
A pre-1996 plate without the blue stripe

The blue stripe was introduced after the entry of Turkey to the European Customs Union in 1996. Often vehicle inspection stickers are stuck on this area.

== Numbering system ==
The text format on the plates is one of the following:

- "99 X 9999", "99 X 99999"
- "99 XX 999", "99 XX 9999" or
- "99 XXX 99", "99 XXX 999"

In some provinces, numbering is categorized in groups for tax collecting offices of different districts, for example dolmuş, a type of public transportation in Ankara have plates of the form "99 X 9999" and a vehicle from Polatlı, Ankara has plates of the form "99 XXX 99", "99 XX 9999" from Etimesgut district. On the other hand, a dolmuş in Eskişehir has a plate of the form "99 X 9999".

99 - two digits prefix denoting the location, shows the province code number of the main residence of car holder. There are 81 provinces in Turkey, each having an assigned number from 01 to 81.

X/XX/XXX – one, two or three letters.

9999/999/99 – four, three or two digits, depending on the number of letters before, not exceeding six letters and digits altogether.

Diplomatic and consular registration plates are issued with randomly generated numbers since 16 August 2004 for security concerns.

== Types ==
Type (Used by)	Appearance	Format and Explanation
General issue		Private vehicles and commercial vehicles owned by private entities.
Provincial governments, university rectors		99 AA 999 (red characters on white background):
Police		99 A 99999, 99 AA 999 or 99 AAA 999 (white on blue)
Gendarmerie		99 JAA 999 (white on blue). Since 2018, replaced old military plates.
Coast Guard		99 SGH 999 (white on blue). Since 2018, replaced old military plates.
Members of international organizations		99 B 9999 (blue on white)
Diplomatic corps		Corps Diplomatique: 99 CD 999: (green on white)
Consulates		Corps consullaire: 99 CC 9999: (white on green)
Temporary		99 G 9999 for temporary transportation, 34 T 99999 for testing (black on yellow). Valid duration for max. 1 month.
Temporary customs		99 GMR 999 (red on green)
Foreigners with temporary residence permit		99 MA 999 to 99 MZ 999: (Black on white)
Syrians with temporary residence permit		99 SAA 999 to 99 SZZ 999: (Black on white)
Taxis (Istanbul province only)		34 TAA 99 to 34 TKZ 99
Taxis (except Istanbul province)		99 T 9999
Vanity plates		Turkey allows vanity plates to be issued. A desired text can be written instead of the serial letter place. 99 [TEXT] 999
Presidential cars		The number plate of the president has no numbers, instead it uses the Presidential Seal of Turkey. Other convoy cars use the format CB 00X ("CB" for Cumhurbaşkanı (English: President)), with golden text on a red background.
Deputy Speaker and chairpeople of the parliamentary commissions		TBMM stands for Grand National Assembly of Turkey
Speaker, Vice President, Members of the Cabinet, Chief of the General Staff, the highest ranking commanders of armies, some undersecretaries		Gold on red (9999)
Province governors		99 9999 (golden on red), with first two-digits as province code number prefix
Official vehicles belonging to the government and public administrations		99 AA 999: (white on black), with first two-digits as province code number prefix
Military		999999 (black on a white rectangle of 7×20 cm on the bumper of the vehicle, painted by a stencil). 000999 General Staff of the Republic of Turkey, 100999 First Army, 200999 Second Army, 300999 Third Army, 400999 Aegean Army, 500999 Navy, 600999 Air Force. Prior to 2018, Gendarmerie used to use 700999 series.
Pre-1996 format (private vehicles)		These plates lacked the blue stripe (euroband) on the left hand side.
Pre-1962 format (private vehicles)		These old plates had the name of the province written in full, black background with white letters and usage of dashes.
Pre-1996 format (police)		white on green

== Location codes ==
Location codes by map

First two digits indicating the province code:

Code	Province	Code	Province	Code	Province
01	Adana	28	Giresun	55	Samsun
02	Adıyaman	29	Gümüşhane	56	Siirt
03	Afyonkarahisar	30	Hakkari	57	Sinop
04	Ağrı	31	Hatay	58	Sivas
05	Amasya	32	Isparta	59	Tekirdağ
06	Ankara	33	Mersin	60	Tokat
07	Antalya	34	İstanbul	61	Trabzon
08	Artvin	35	İzmir	62	Tunceli
09	Aydın	36	Kars	63	Şanlıurfa
10	Balıkesir	37	Kastamonu	64	Uşak
11	Bilecik	38	Kayseri	65	Van
12	Bingöl	39	Kırklareli	66	Yozgat
13	Bitlis	40	Kırşehir	67	Zonguldak
14	Bolu	41	Kocaeli	68	Aksaray
15	Burdur	42	Konya	69	Bayburt
16	Bursa	43	Kütahya	70	Karaman
17	Çanakkale	44	Malatya	71	Kırıkkale
18	Çankırı	45	Manisa	72	Batman
19	Çorum	46	Kahramanmaraş	73	Şırnak
20	Denizli	47	Mardin	74	Bartın
21	Diyarbakır	48	Muğla	75	Ardahan
22	Edirne	49	Muş	76	Iğdır
23	Elazığ	50	Nevşehir	77	Yalova
24	Erzincan	51	Niğde	78	Karabük
25	Erzurum	52	Ordu	79	Kilis
26	Eskişehir	53	Rize	80	Osmaniye
27	Gaziantep	54	Sakarya	81	Düzce

Province names until code 67 go alphabetically, with the exception of Mersin, Kahramanmaraş and Şanlıurfa provinces for their previous names taken in account were İçel, Maraş and Urfa, respectively. The ones after the original 67 provinces are newer additions, these province names go chronologically.

== See also ==
- Vehicle registration plate
- Vehicle registration plates of Europe
- Vehicle registration plates of Northern Cyprus
