= Taipei Economic and Cultural Mission, Ankara =

Representative office of the Republic of China to Turkey

- (Taiwan) 駐安卡拉台北經濟文化代表團; Taipei Economic and Cultural Mission in Ankara; Taipei Ekonomik ve Kültür Misyonu

Agency overview
- Formed: 1993
- Jurisdiction: Turkey; Georgia; Armenia; Cyprus; Bulgaria; Serbia; North Macedonia; Albania; Kosovo; Montenegro; Serbia; Bosnia and Herzegovina; Croatia; Slovenia
- Headquarters: Ankara, Turkey
- Agency executive: Volkan Chih-Yang, HUANG, Representative
- Website: Taipei Economic and Cultural Mission in Ankara

The Taipei Economic and Cultural Mission in Ankara; (Chinese: 駐土耳其代表處; pinyin: Zhù Tǔ'ěrqí Dàibiǎo Chù) (Turkish: Taipei Ekonomik ve Kültür Misyonu) represents the interests of Taiwan in Turkey in the absence of formal diplomatic relations, functioning as a de facto embassy. It was established in 1993.

Turkey had diplomatic relations with Taiwan as the Republic of China until 1971, when it recognised the People's Republic of China.

Its counterpart in Taiwan is the Turkish Trade Office in Taipei.

The Office is headed by a Representative, currently Volkan Chih-Yang Huang.

== Representatives ==
- Cheng Tai-Hsiang (鄭泰祥)

== See also ==
- List of diplomatic missions of Taiwan
- List of diplomatic missions in Turkey
