= Trade Office of Turkey, Taipei =

Representative office of Turkey to the Republic of China

Turkish Trade Office in Taipei
- 駐台北土耳其貿易辦事處

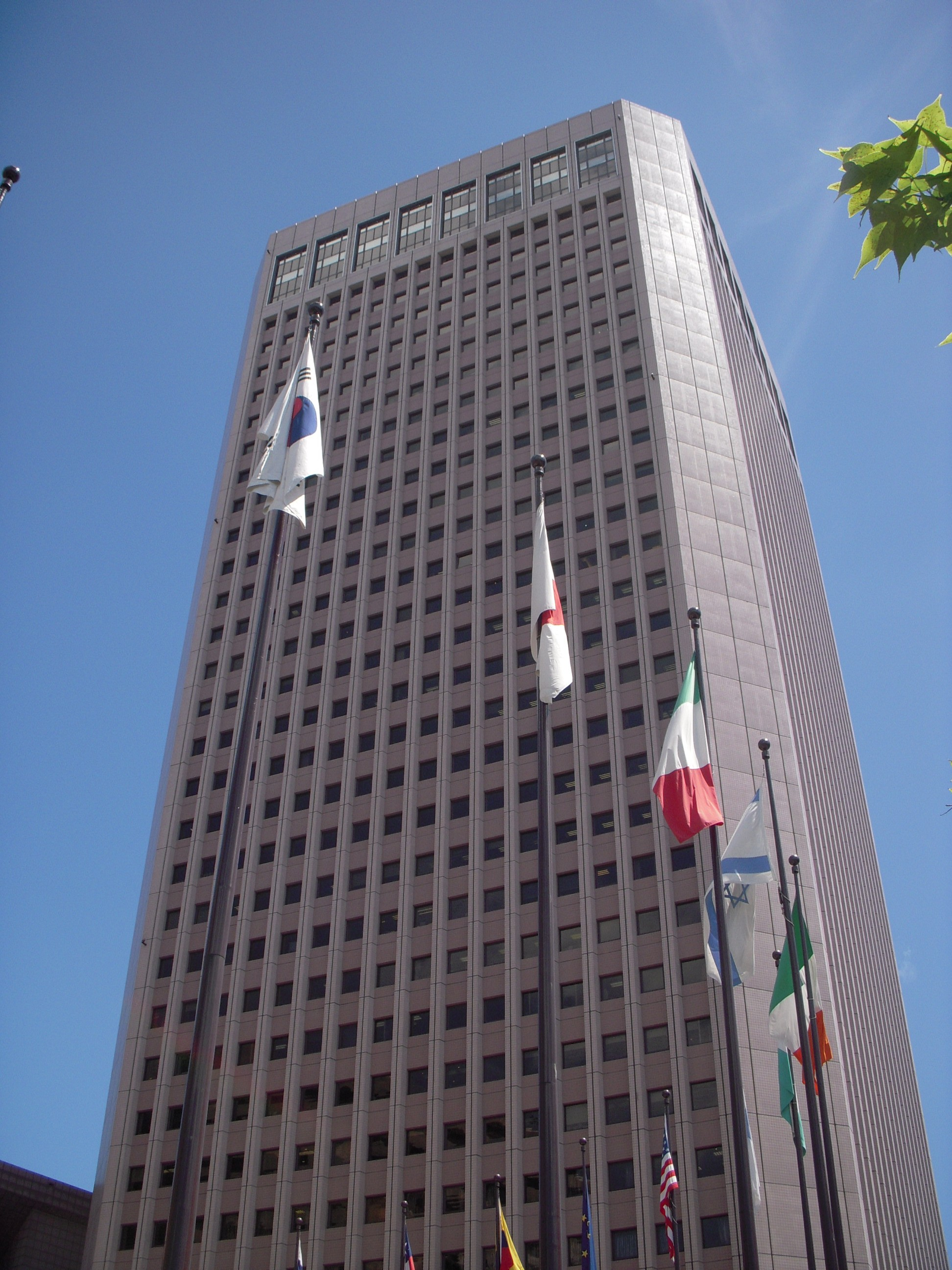
- The Turkish Trade Office at the International Trade Building

Agency overview
- Formed: 1993
- Jurisdiction: Republic of China (Taiwan)
- Headquarters: Taipei, Taiwan
- Agency executive: Fikret Türkeş, Representative
- Website: Turkish Trade Office in Taipei

The Turkish Trade Office in Taipei (Chinese: 駐台北土耳其貿易辦事處; pinyin: Zhù Táiběi Tǔ'ěrqí Màoyì Bànshì Chù; Turkish: Taipei Türk Ticaret Ofisi) represents the interests of Turkey in Taiwan in the absence of formal diplomatic relations, functioning as a de facto embassy. It was established in 1993.

Turkey had diplomatic relations with Taiwan as the Republic of China until 1971, when it recognised the People's Republic of China.

Its counterpart in Turkey is the Taipei Economic and Cultural Mission in Ankara.

The Office is headed by the Representative, Fikret Türkeş.

== See also ==
- List of diplomatic missions in Taiwan
- List of diplomatic missions of Turkey
