= List of diplomatic missions in Turkey =

Turkey hosts 139 embassies in Ankara. Several other countries have ambassadors accredited to Turkey, with most being resident in Berlin or Brussels. This listing excludes honorary consulates.

Map of countries with a diplomatic mission in Turkey Turkey Embassy and Consulate(s) General Embassy Consulate General Trade Office

== Missions in Ankara ==
=== Embassies ===
1. Afghanistan
2. Albania
3. Algeria
4. Angola
5. Argentina
6. Australia
7. Austria
8. Azerbaijan
9. Bahrain
10. Bangladesh
11. Belarus
12. Belgium
13. Bolivia
14. Bosnia and Herzegovina
15. Brazil
16. Brunei
17. Bulgaria
18. Burkina Faso
19. Burundi
20. Cambodia
21. Cameroon
22. Canada
23. Chad
24. Chile
25. China
26. Colombia
27. Congo-Brazzaville
28. Congo-Kinshasa
29. Costa Rica
30. Croatia
31. Cuba
32. Czech Republic
33. Denmark
34. Djibouti
35. Dominican Republic
36. Ecuador
37. Egypt
38. El Salvador
39. Equatorial Guinea
40. Estonia
41. Ethiopia
42. Finland
43. France
44. Gabon
45. Gambia
46. Georgia
47. Germany
48. Ghana
49. Greece
50. Guatemala
51. Guinea
52. Guinea-Bissau
53. Holy See
54. Hungary
55. India
56. Indonesia
57. Iran
58. Iraq
59. Ireland
60. Israel
61. Italy
62. Ivory Coast
63. Japan
64. Jordan
65. Kazakhstan
66. Kenya
67. Kosovo
68. Kuwait
69. Kyrgyzstan
70. Latvia
71. Lebanon
72. Libya
73. Lithuania
74. Luxembourg
75. Malaysia
76. Maldives
77. Mali
78. Malta
79. Mauritania
80. Mexico
81. Moldova
82. Mongolia
83. Montenegro
84. Morocco
85. Netherlands
86. New Zealand
87. Nicaragua
88. Niger
89. Nigeria
90. Northern Cyprus
91. North Macedonia
92. Norway
93. Oman
94. Pakistan
95. Palestine
96. Panama
97. Paraguay
98. Peru
99. Philippines
100. Poland
101. Portugal
102. Qatar
103. Romania
104. Russia
105. Rwanda
106. Saudi Arabia
107. Senegal
108. Serbia
109. Sierra Leone
110. Singapore
111. Slovakia
112. Slovenia
113. Somalia
114. South Africa
115. South Korea
116. South Sudan
117. Spain
118. Sri Lanka
119. Sudan
120. Sweden
121. Switzerland
122. Syria
123. Tajikistan
124. Tanzania
125. Thailand
126. Togo
127. Tunisia
128. Turkmenistan
129. Uganda
130. Ukraine
131. United Arab Emirates
132. United Kingdom
133. United States
134. Uruguay
135. Uzbekistan
136. Venezuela
137. Vietnam
138. Yemen
139. Zambia
140. Zimbabwe

=== Other missions and delegations ===
- European Union (Delegation)
- Republic of China (Taiwan) (Taipei Economic and Cultural Mission in Ankara)
- Somaliland (Representative Office)
- Bashkortostan (Russia) (Foreign Economic Relations Office)

=== Gallery ===
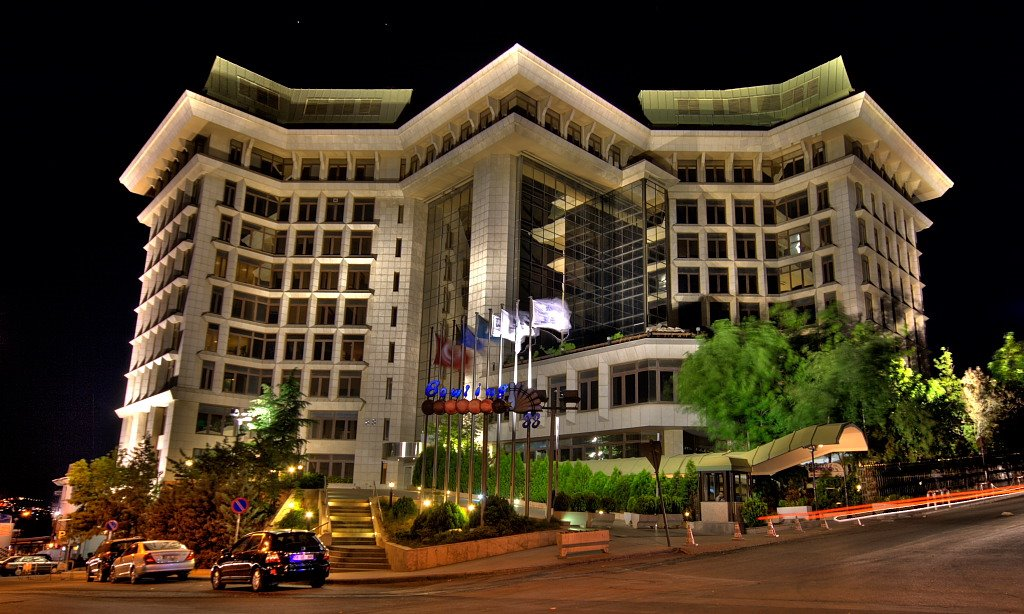
Embassies of Australia and Ireland, and Delegation of the European Union

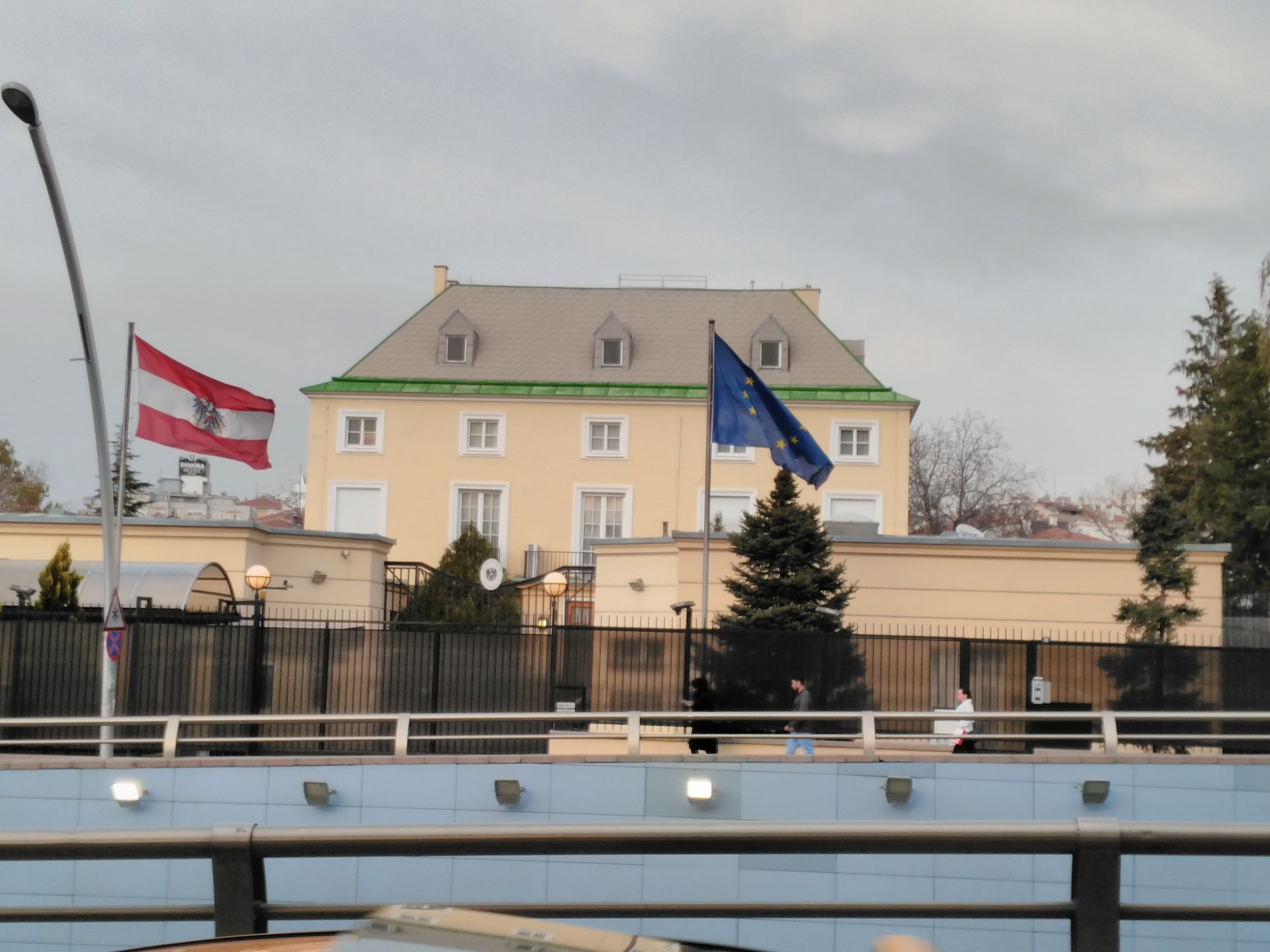
Embassy of Austria

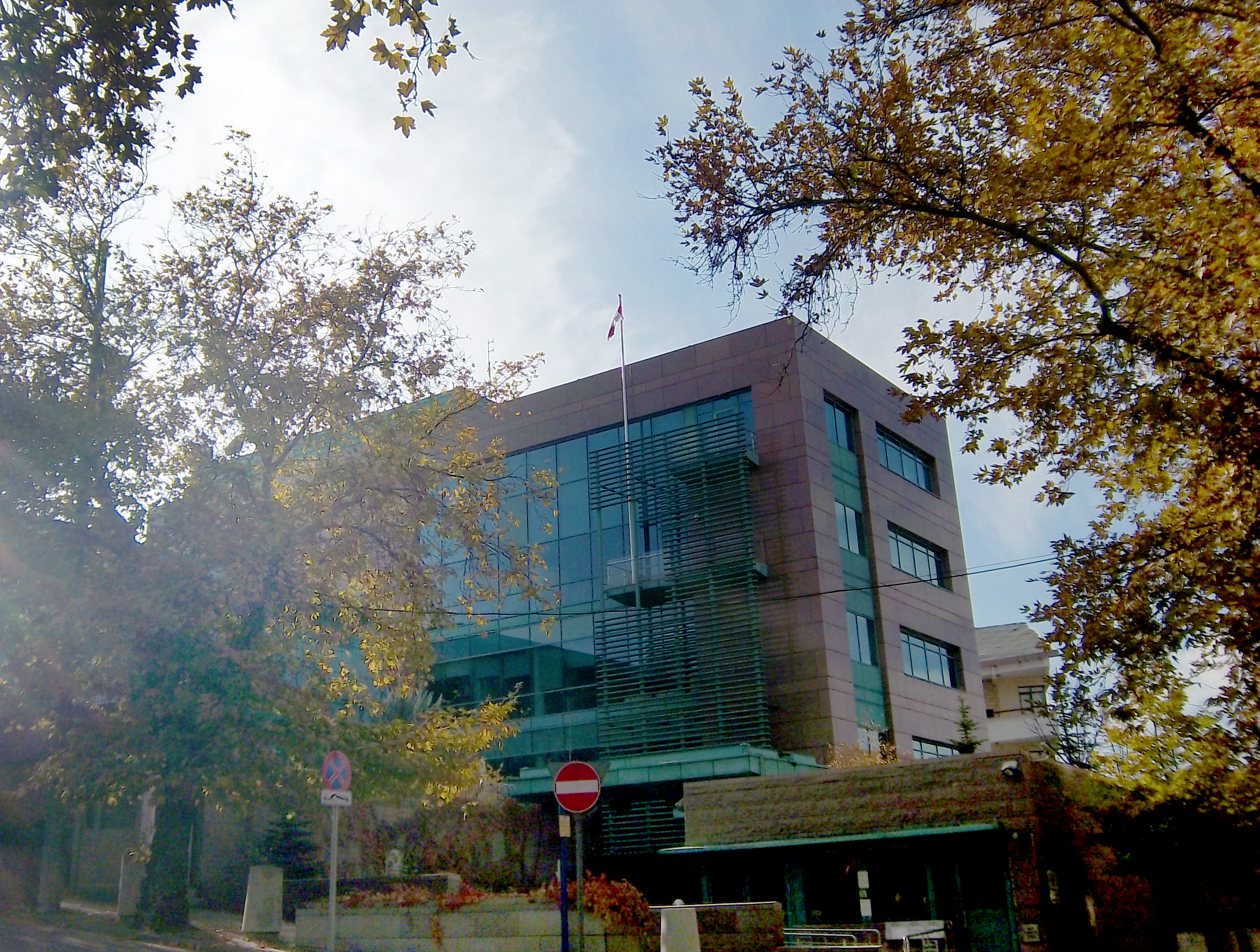
Embassy of Canada

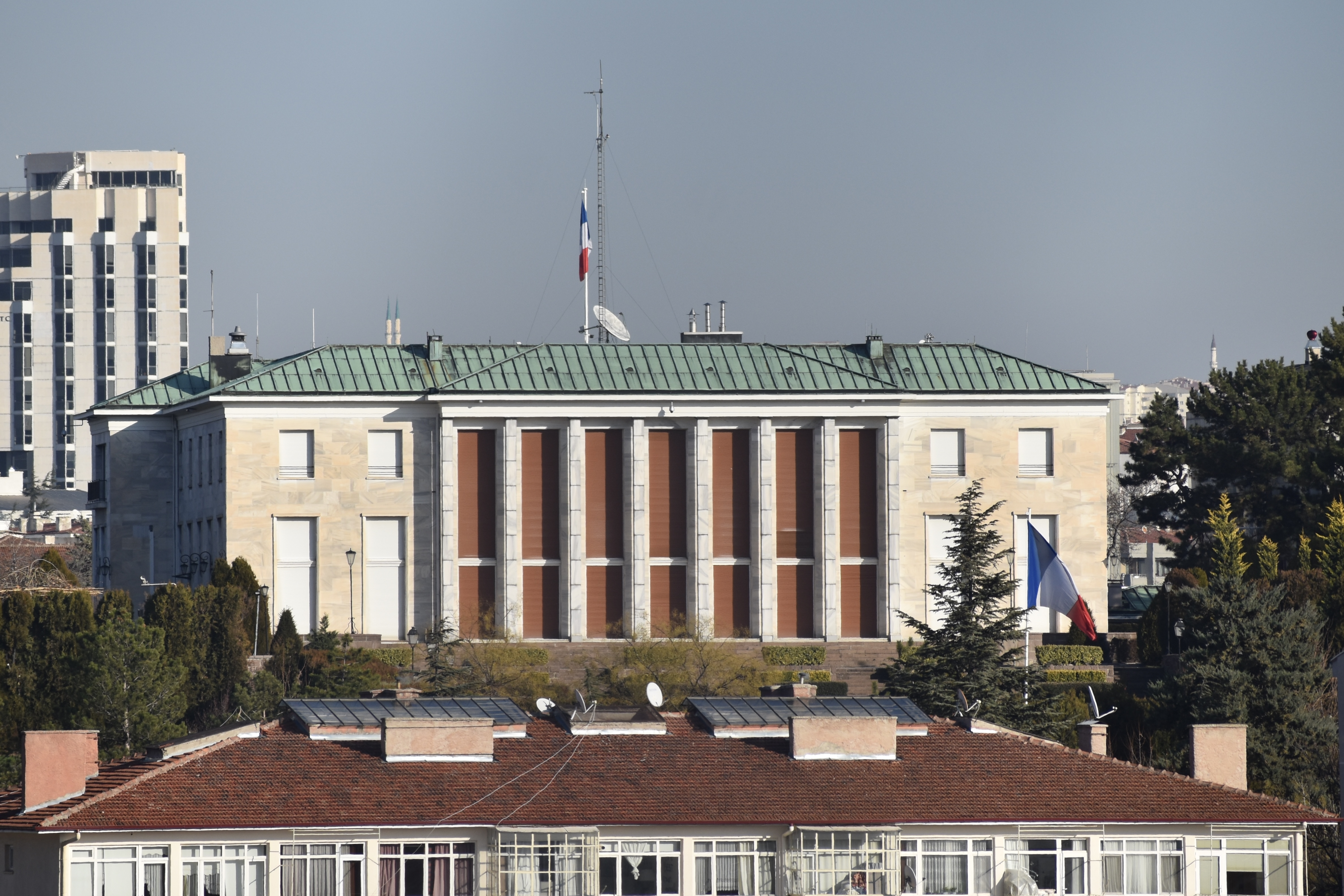
Embassy of France

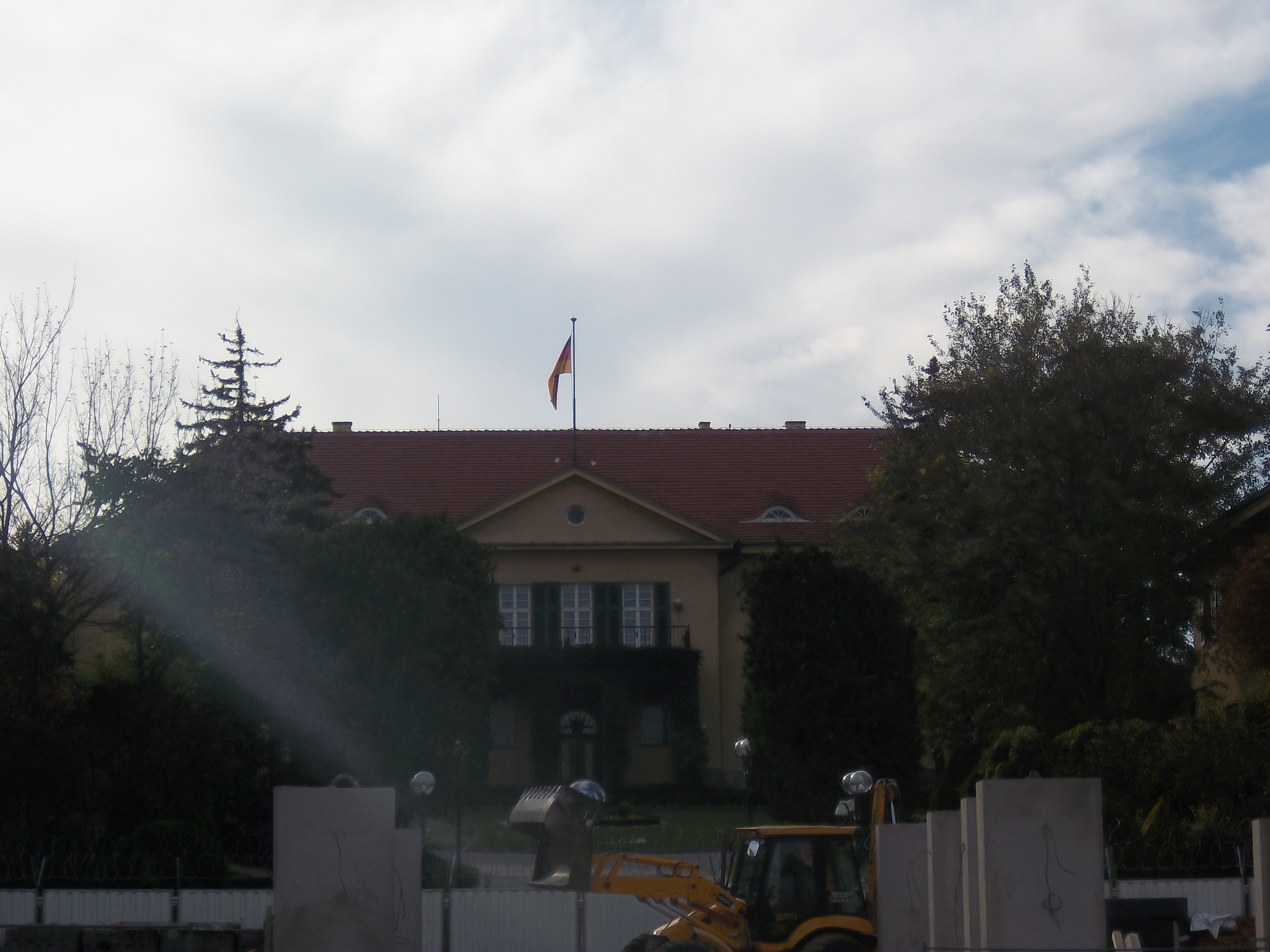
Embassy of Germany

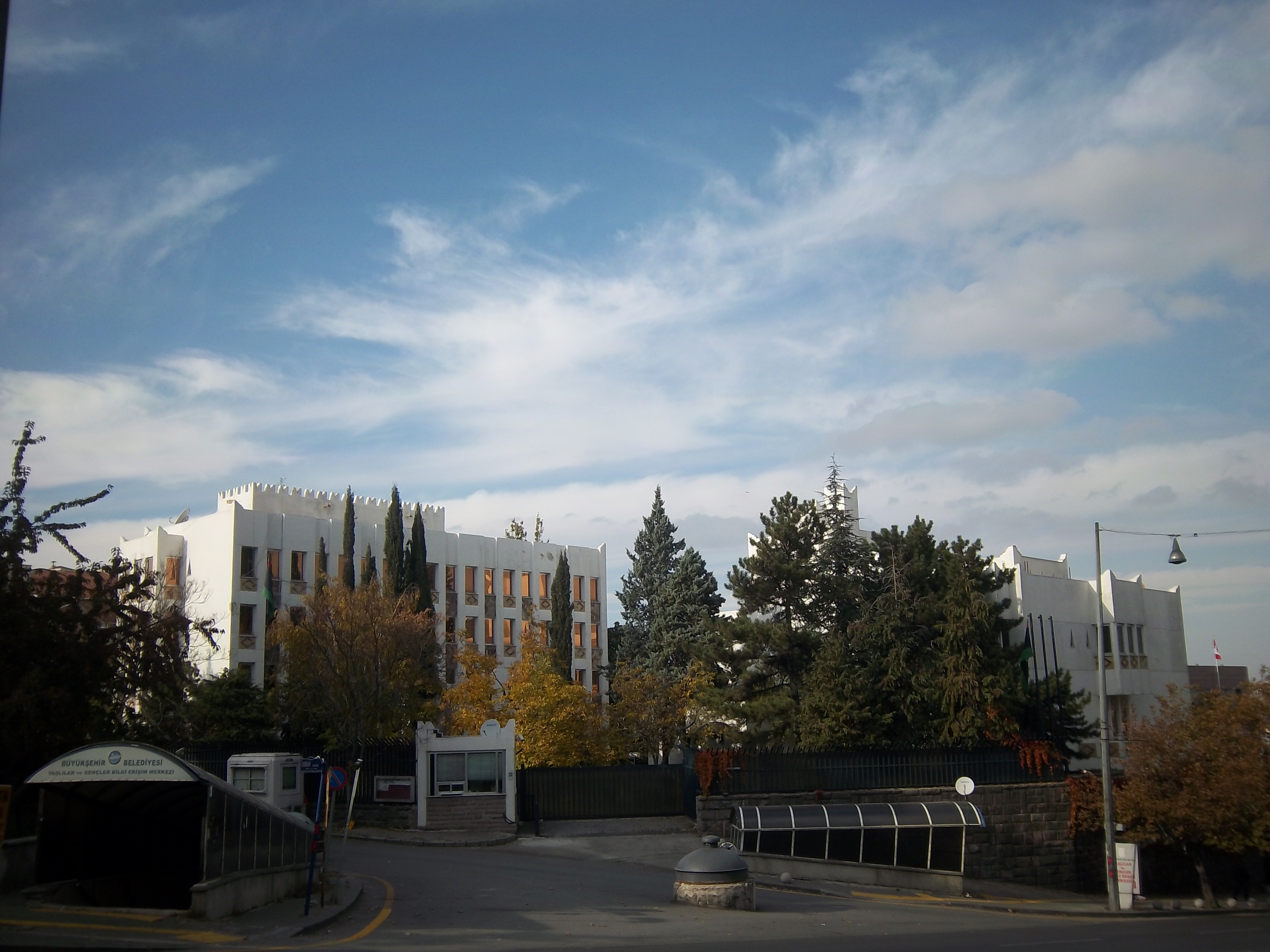
Embassy of Libya

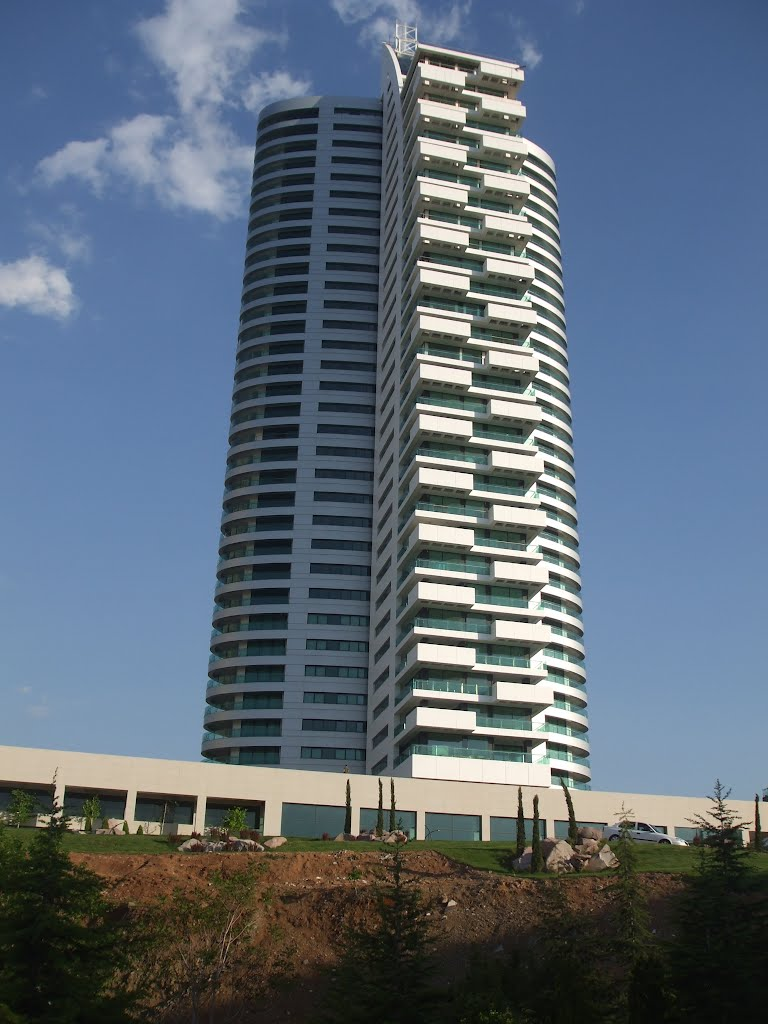
Building hosting the Embassies of Croatia, Mexico and Norway

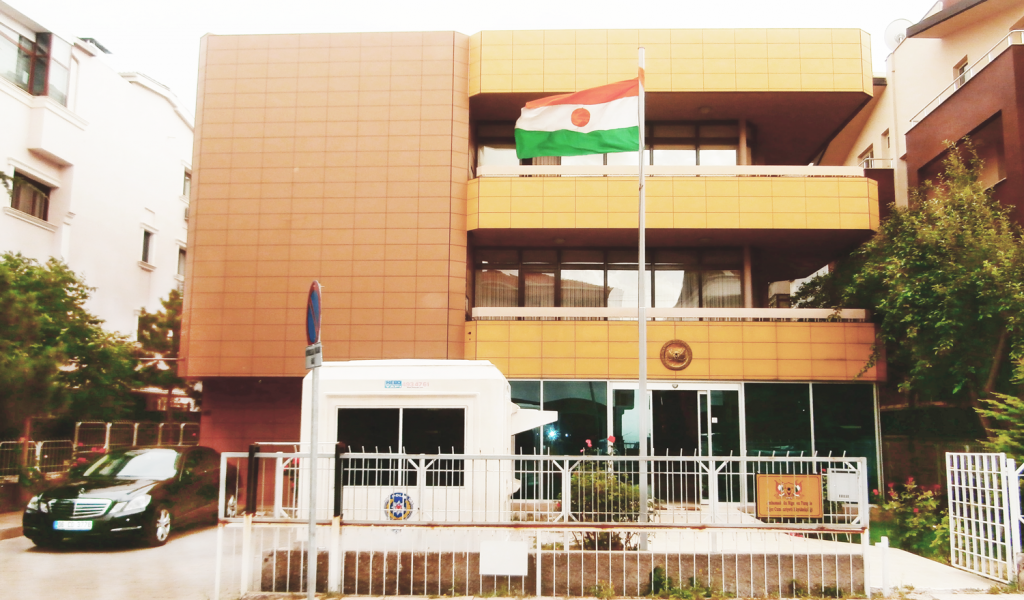
Embassy of Niger

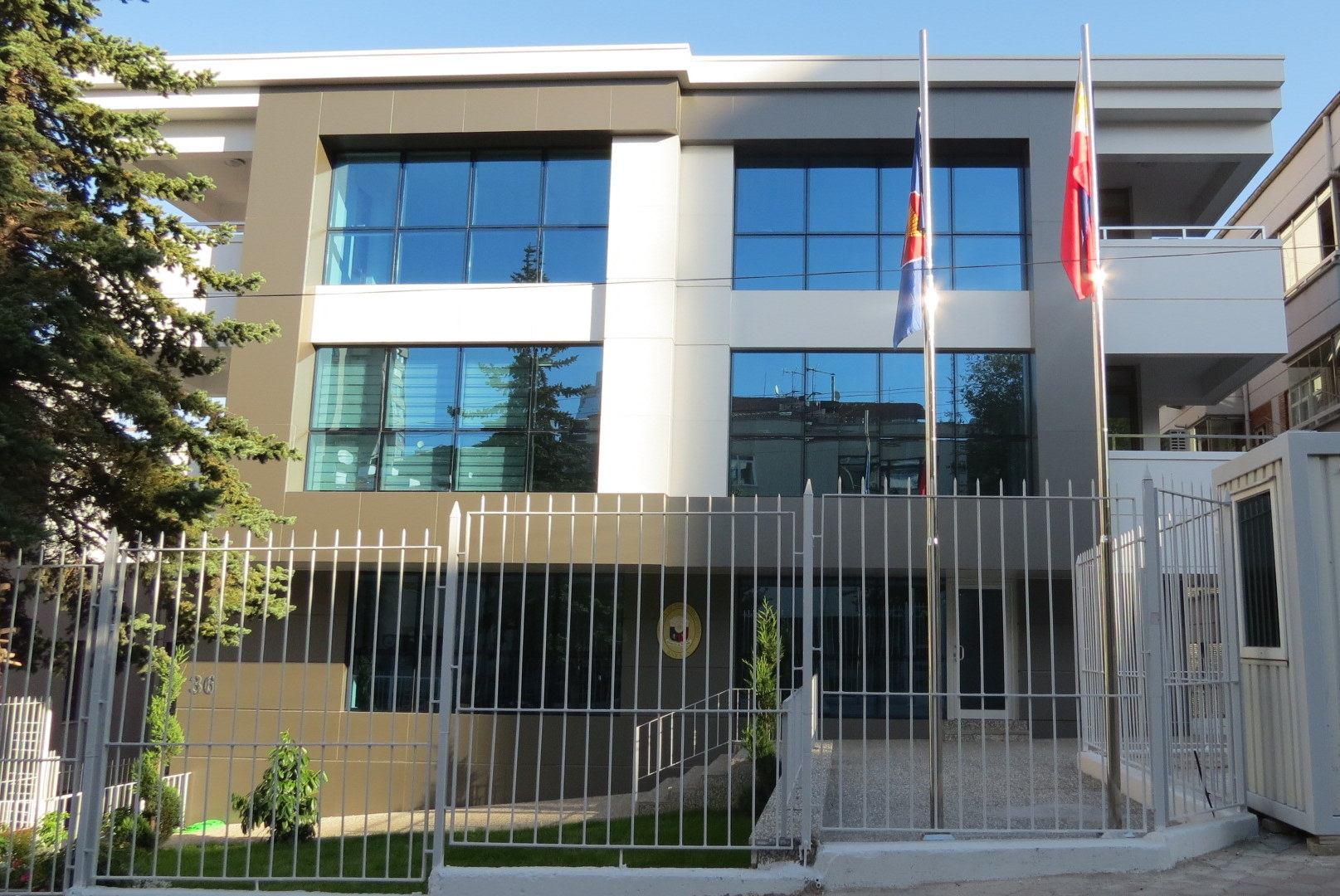
Embassy of the Philippines

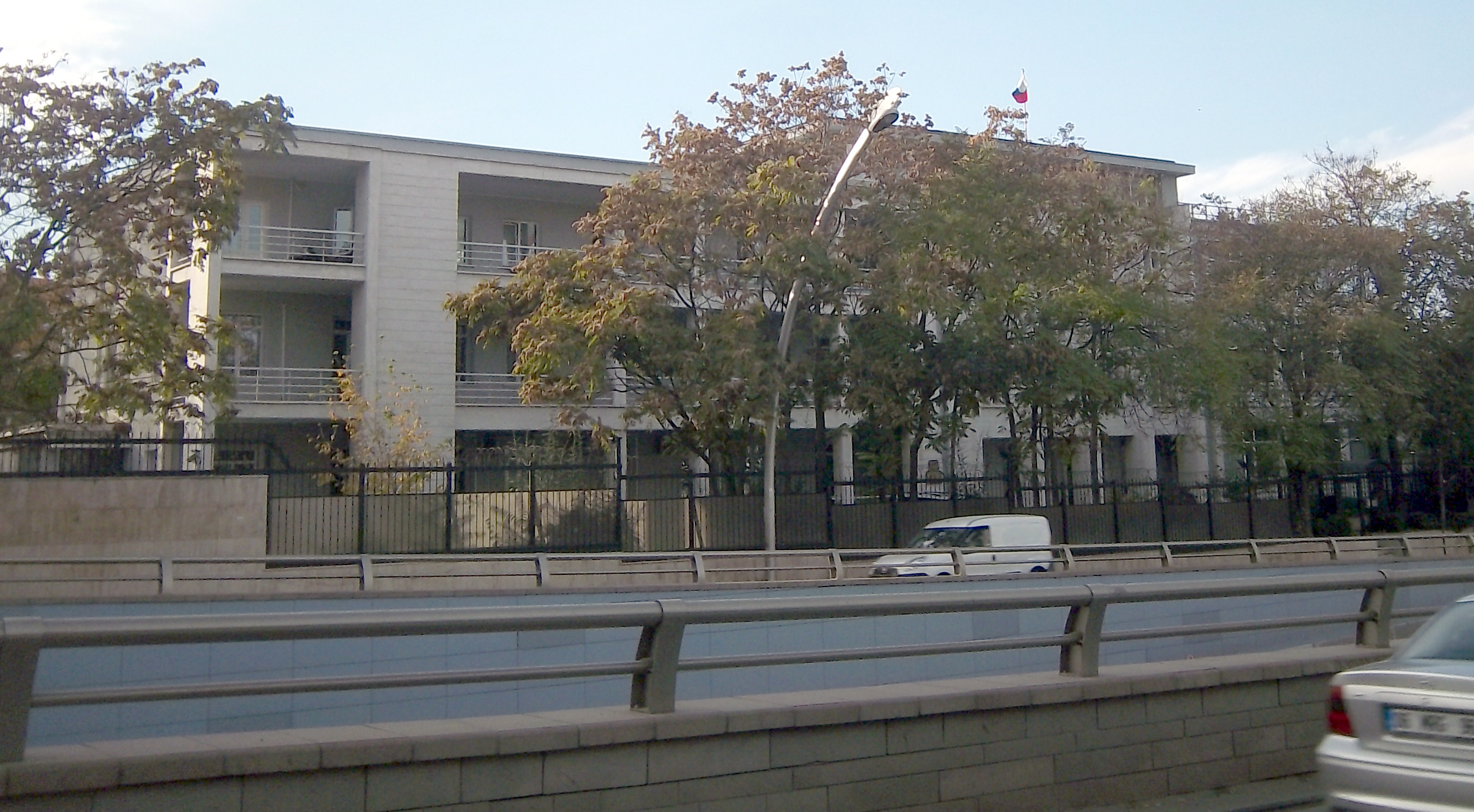
Embassy of Russia

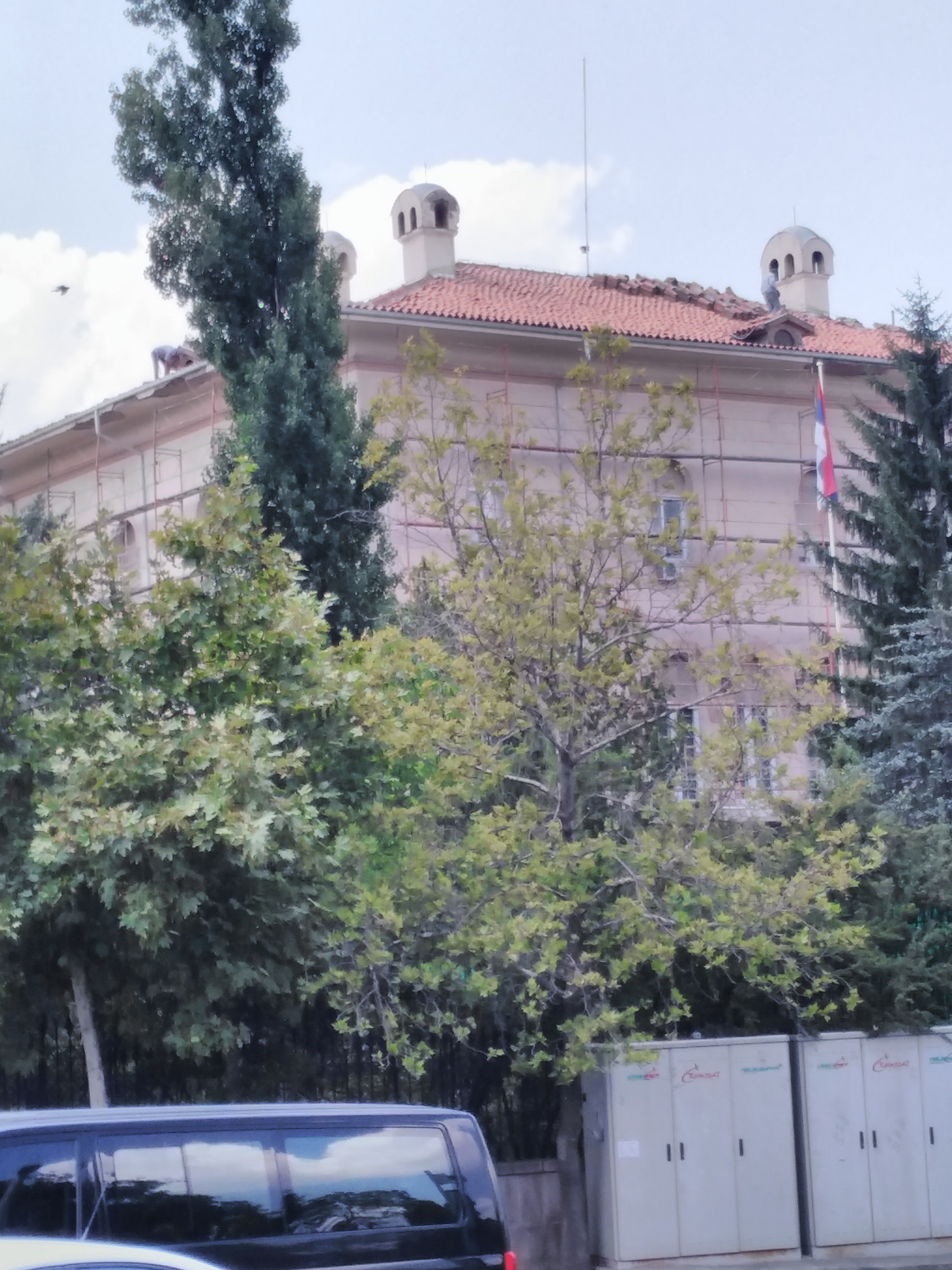
Embassy of Serbia

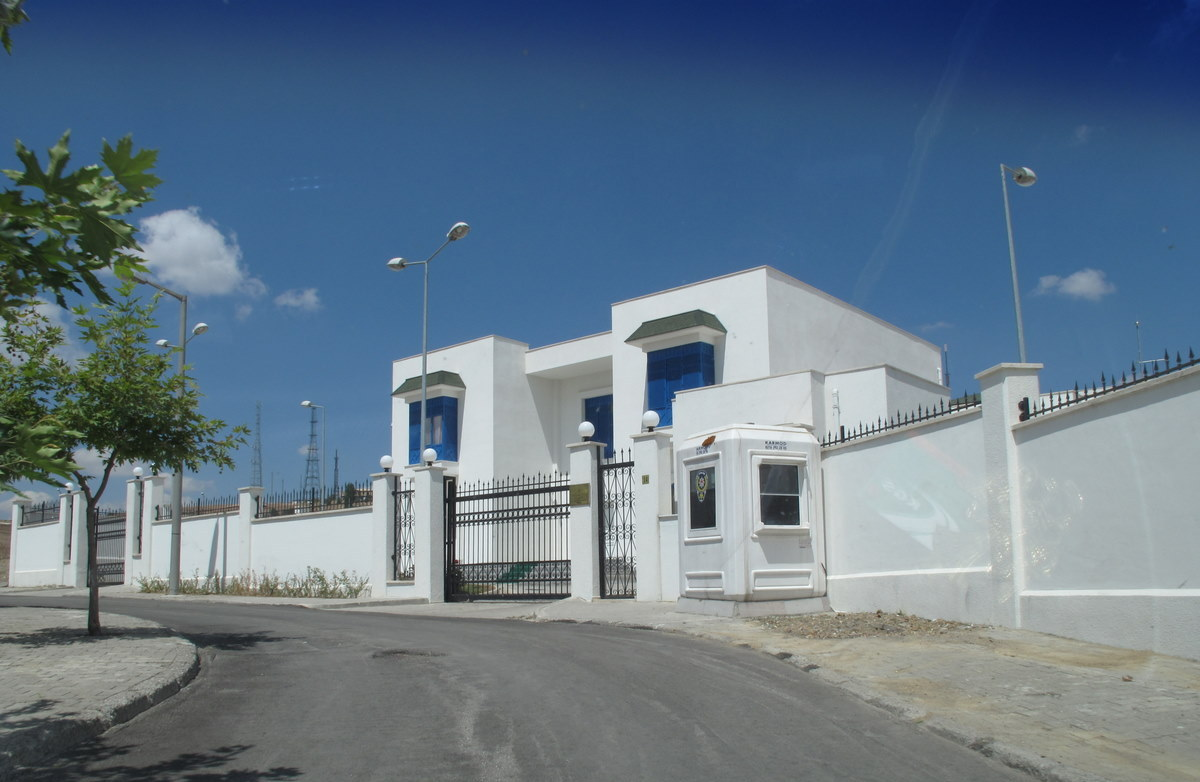
Embassy of Tunisia

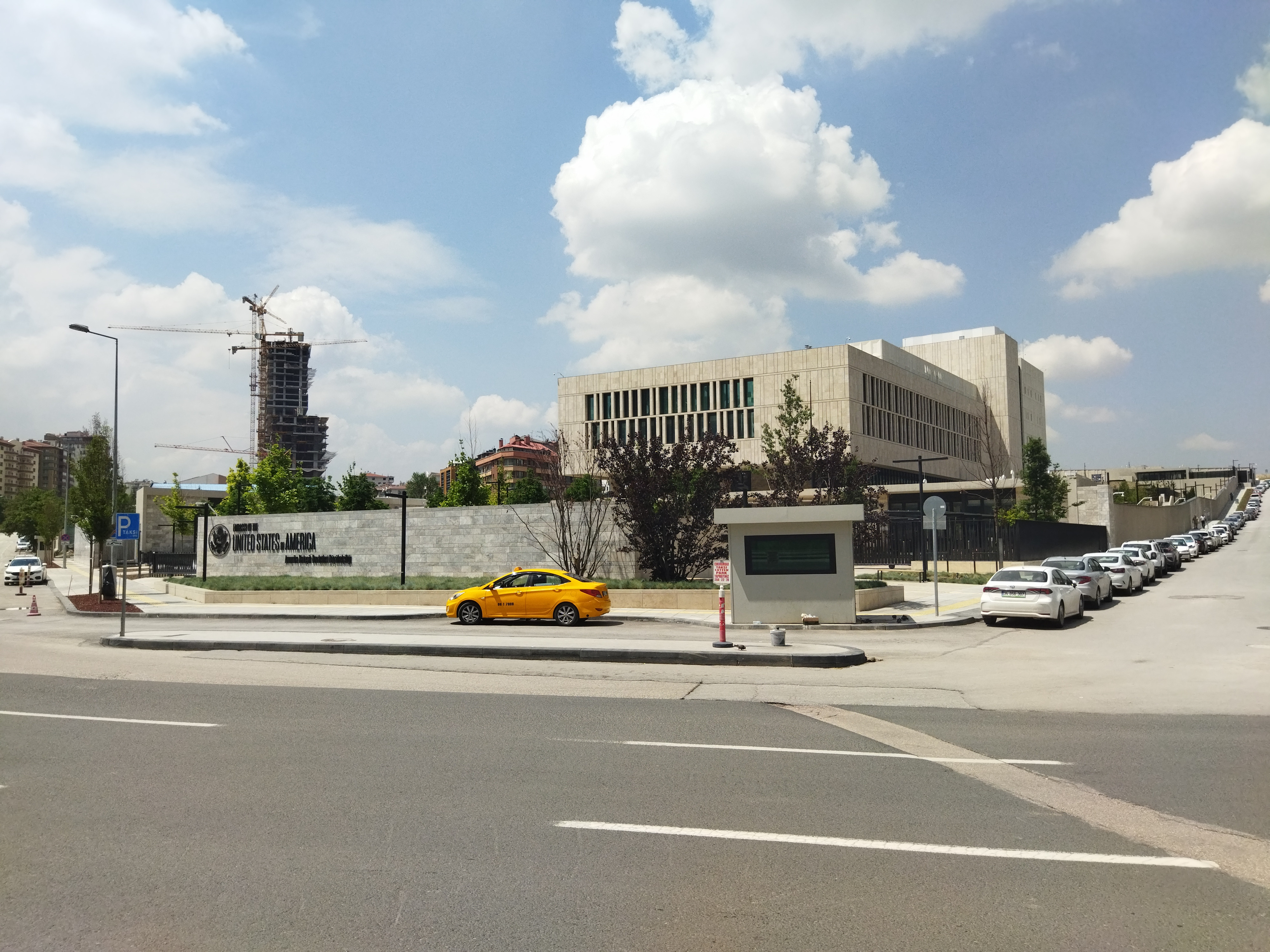
Embassy of the United States

== Consular Missions ==
=== Adana ===
- United States (Consulate)

=== Antalya ===
- Germany
- Kazakhstan
- Kyrgyzstan
- Northern Cyprus
- Russia
- Ukraine
- United Kingdom (Vice Consulate)

=== Bursa ===
- Bulgaria (Consular Office)

=== Çanakkale ===
- Australia (Consulate)

=== Edirne ===
- Bulgaria
- Greece (Consulate)

=== Erzurum ===
- Iran

=== Gaziantep ===
- Iraq
- Northern Cyprus
- Syria
- United States (State Department branch) (Note: A mission for humanitarian work, which is expected to be shut down in 2025.)

=== Iğdır ===
- Azerbaijan (Consular Mission)

=== Istanbul ===
1. Afghanistan
2. Albania
3. Algeria
4. Angola
5. Argentina
6. Australia
7. Austria
8. Azerbaijan
9. Bangladesh
10. Belarus
11. Belgium
12. Bosnia and Herzegovina
13. Brazil
14. Bulgaria
15. Canada
16. China
17. Colombia
18. Croatia
19. Cuba
20. Czech Republic
21. Denmark
22. Egypt
23. Ethiopia
24. France
25. Georgia
26. Germany
27. Ghana
28. Greece
29. Guinea-Bissau
30. Hungary
31. India
32. Indonesia
33. Iran
34. Iraq
35. Israel
36. Italy
37. Japan
38. Kazakhstan
39. Kosovo
40. Kuwait
41. Kyrgyzstan
42. Lebanon
43. Libya
44. Malaysia
45. Malta
46. Mexico (Consulate)
47. Moldova
48. Mongolia
49. Montenegro
50. Morocco
51. Netherlands
52. Northern Cyprus
53. North Macedonia
54. Pakistan
55. Palestine
56. Panama
57. Philippines
58. Poland
59. Qatar
60. Romania
61. Russia
62. Saudi Arabia
63. Serbia
64. Slovakia
65. South Korea
66. Spain
67. Sudan
68. Sweden
69. Switzerland
70. Syria
71. Tajikistan
72. Tunisia
73. Turkmenistan
74. Ukraine
75. United Arab Emirates
76. United Kingdom
77. United States
78. Uruguay
79. Uzbekistan
80. Venezuela

==== Other missions and delegations ====
- Abkhazia (Representative Office)
- South Ossetia (Representative Office)
- Dagestan (Representative Office)
- Tatarstan (Representative Office)
- Armenia (Permanent mission to the BSEC)

==== Gallery ====
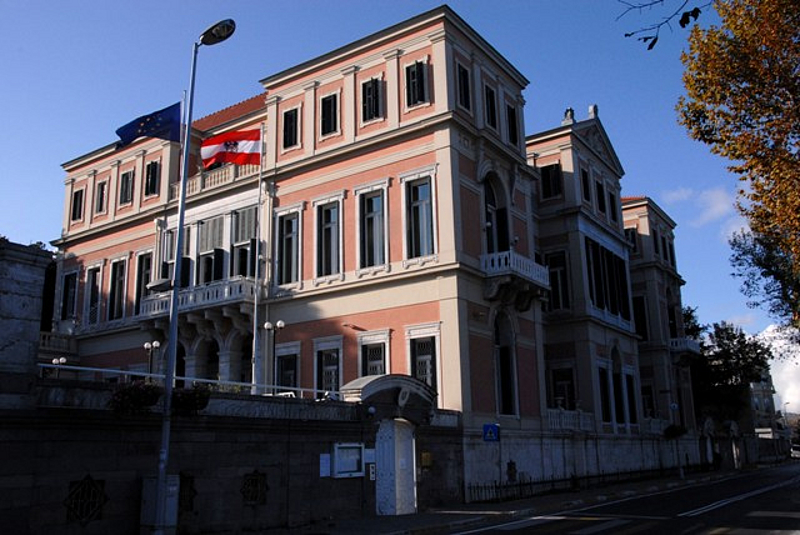
Consulate-General of Austria

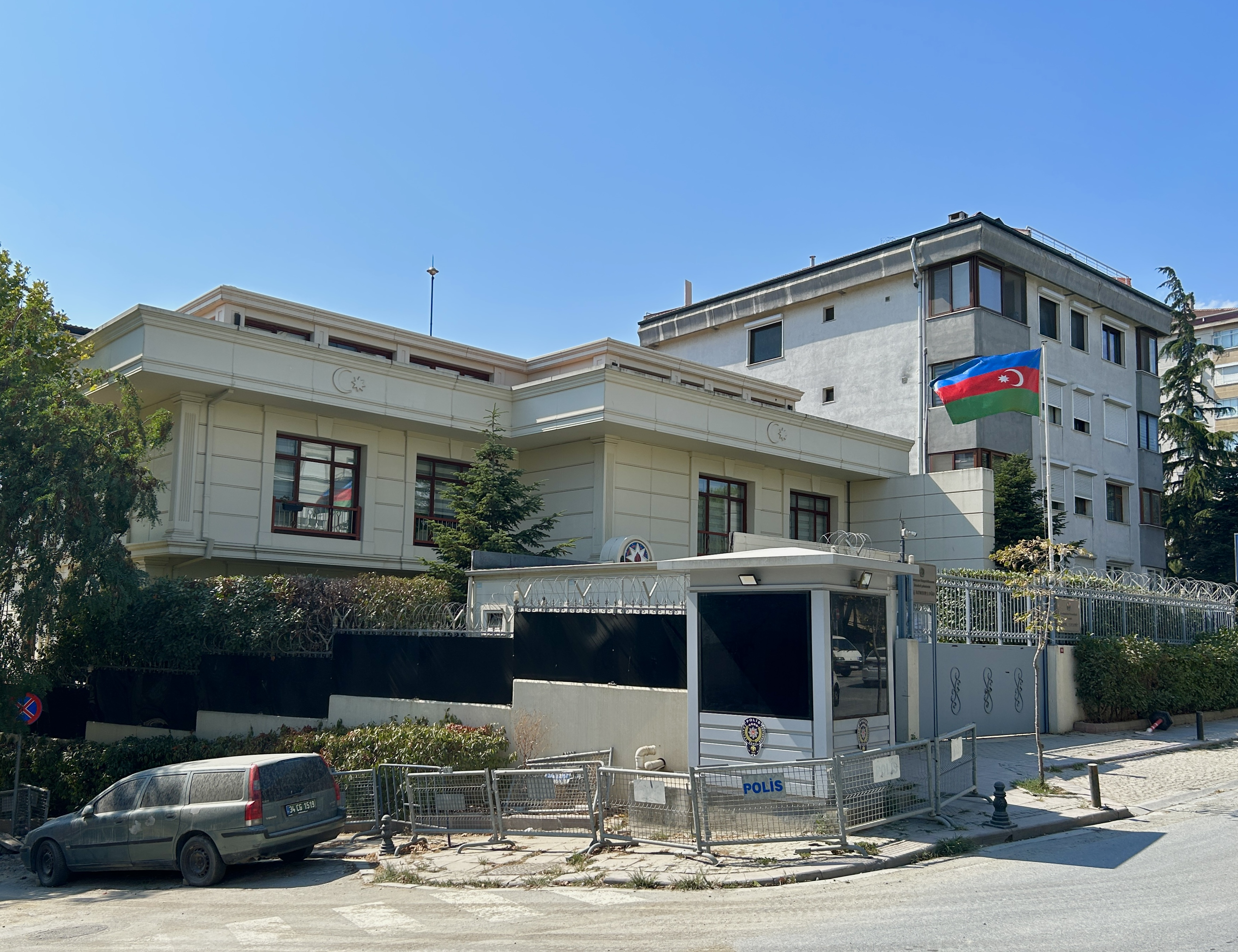
Consulate-General of Azerbaijan

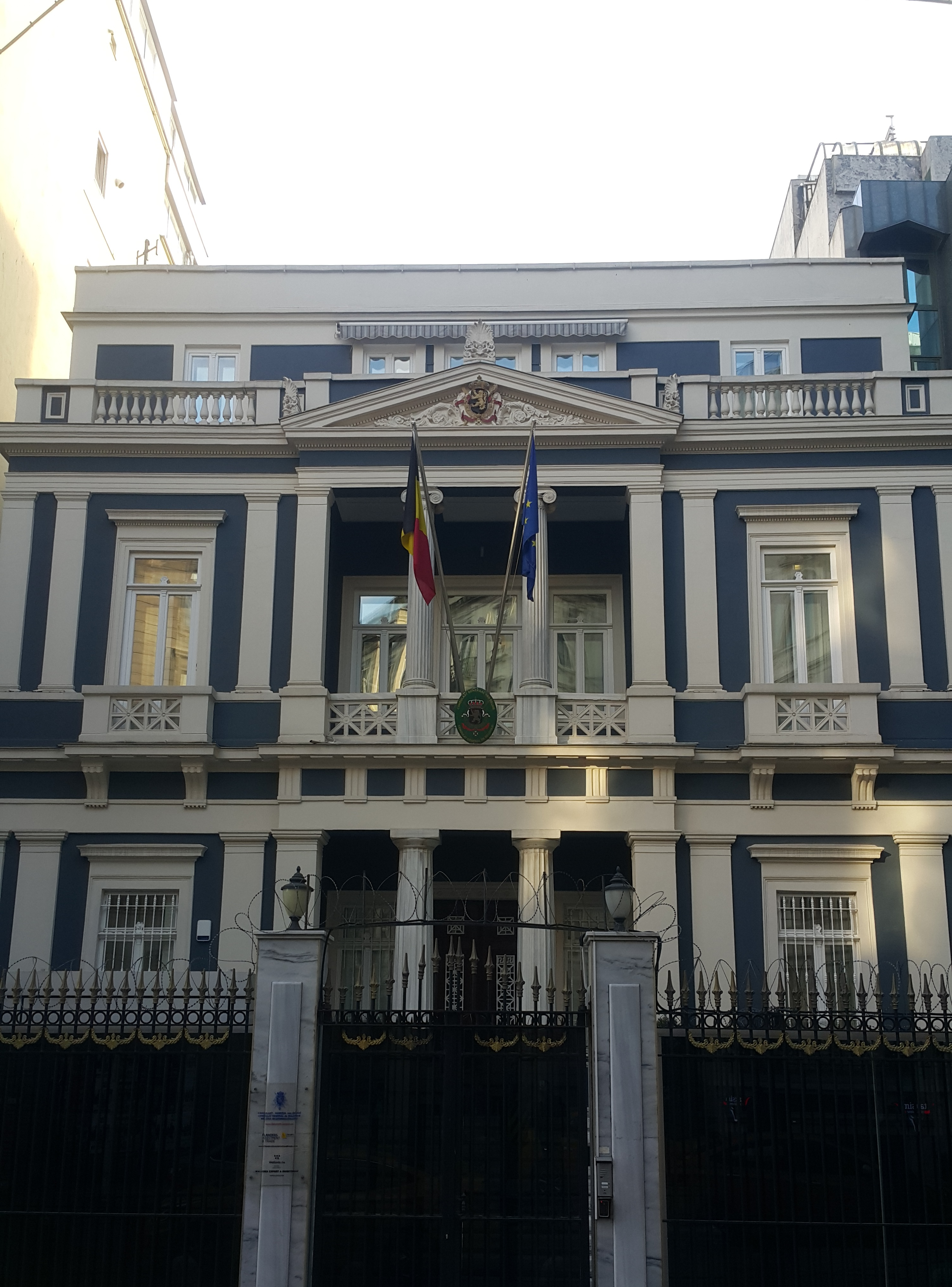
Consulate-General of Belgium

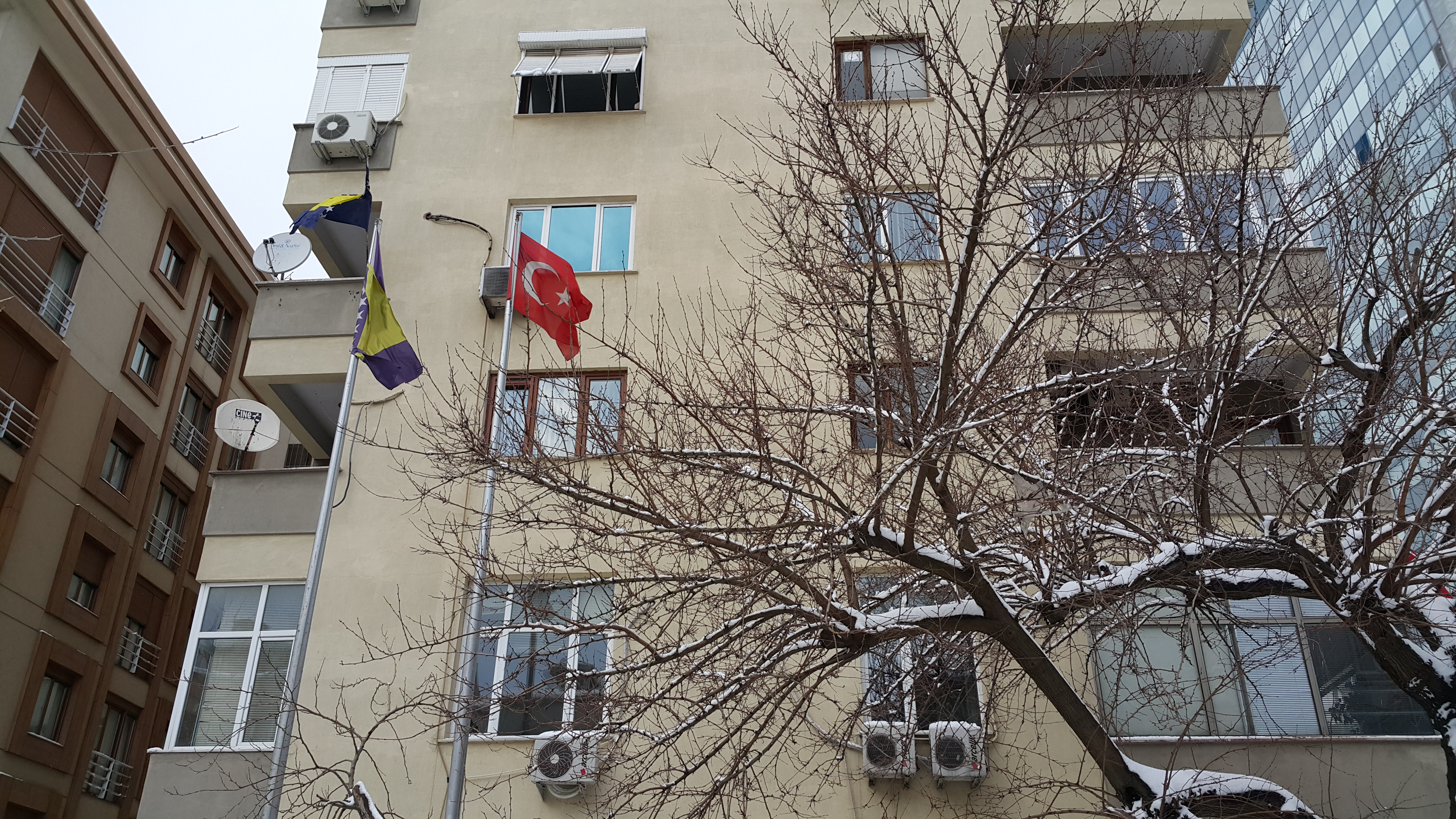
Consulate-General of Bosnia and Herzegovina

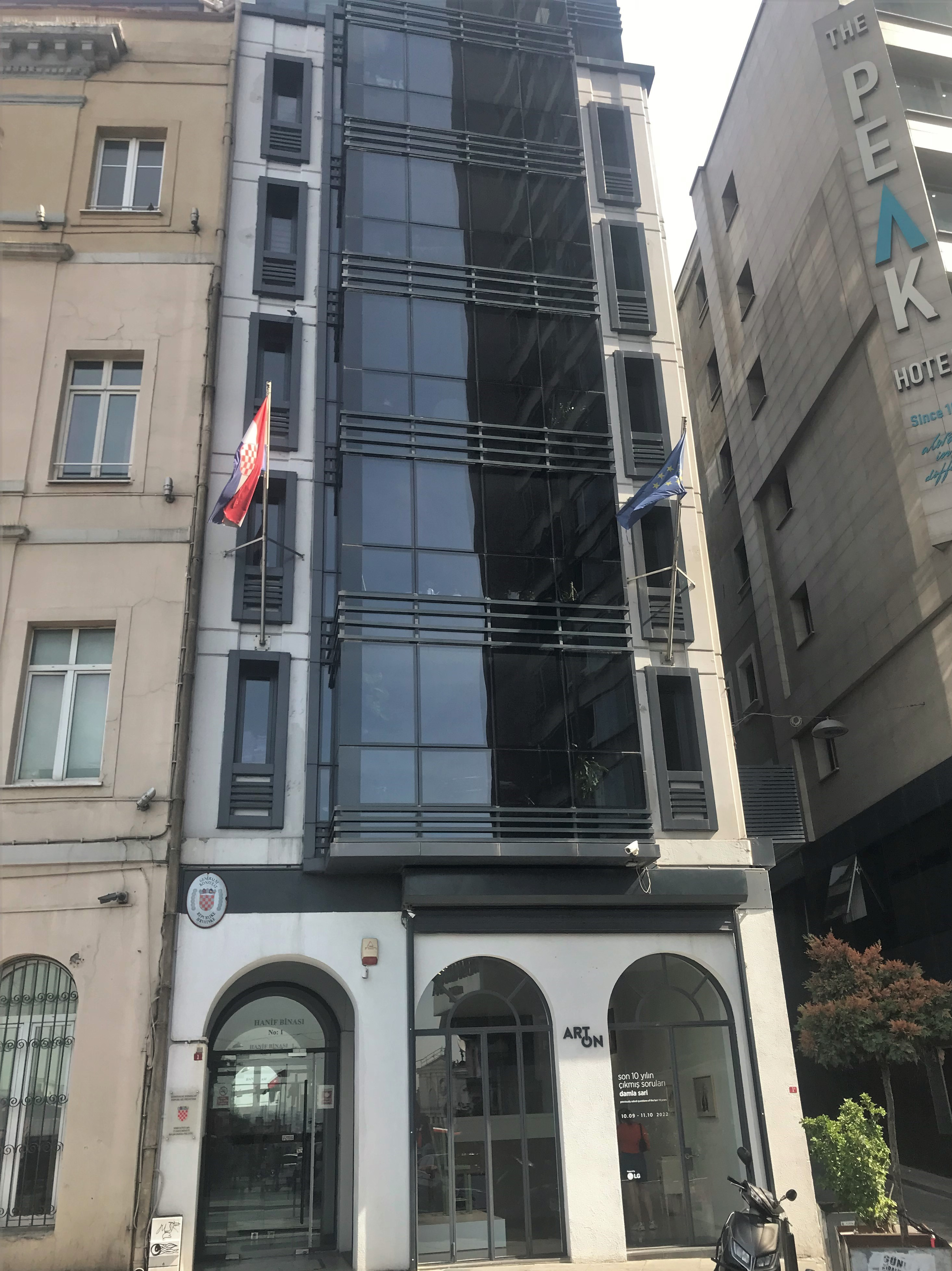
Consulate-General of Croatia

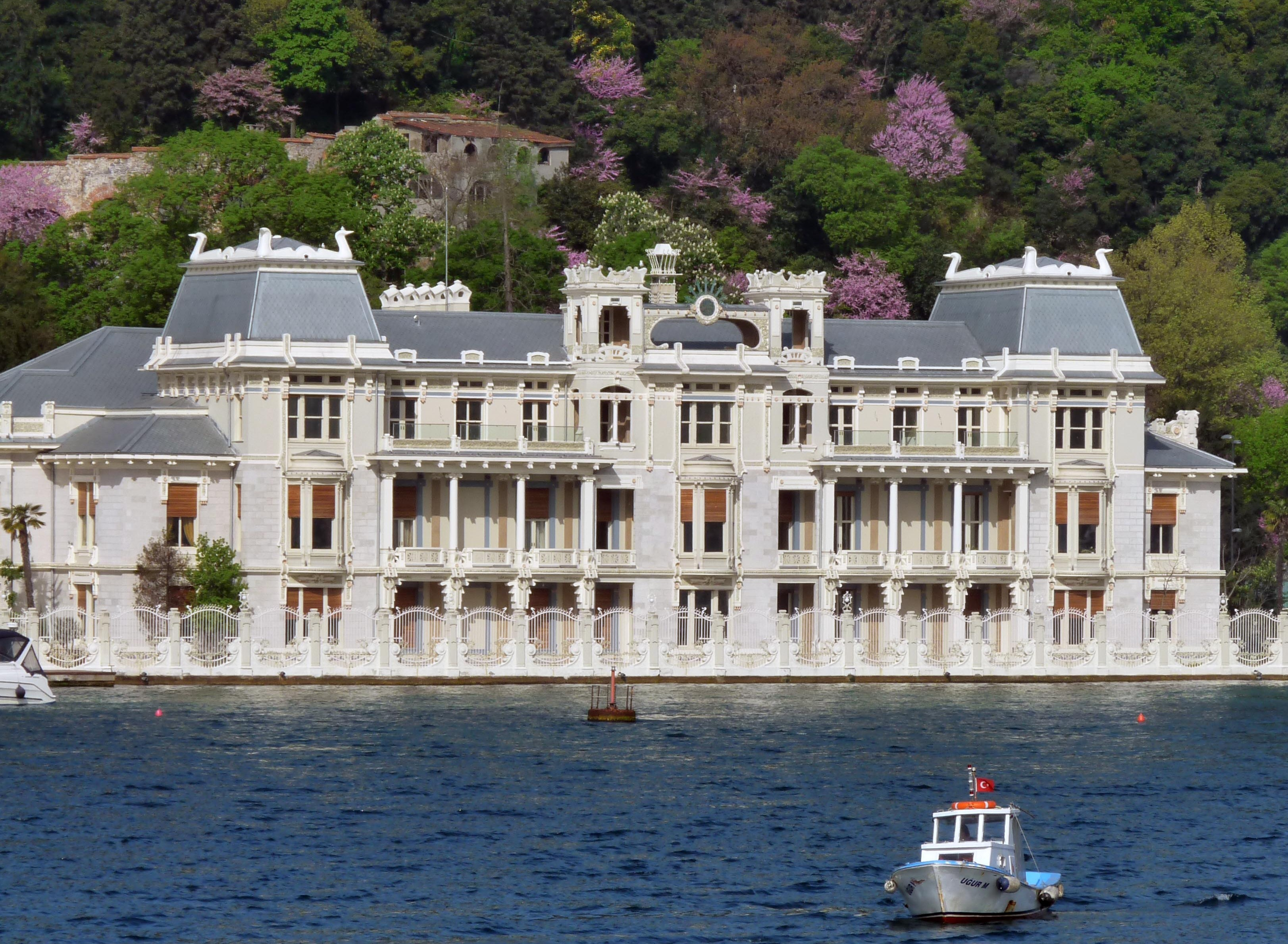
Consulate-General of Egypt

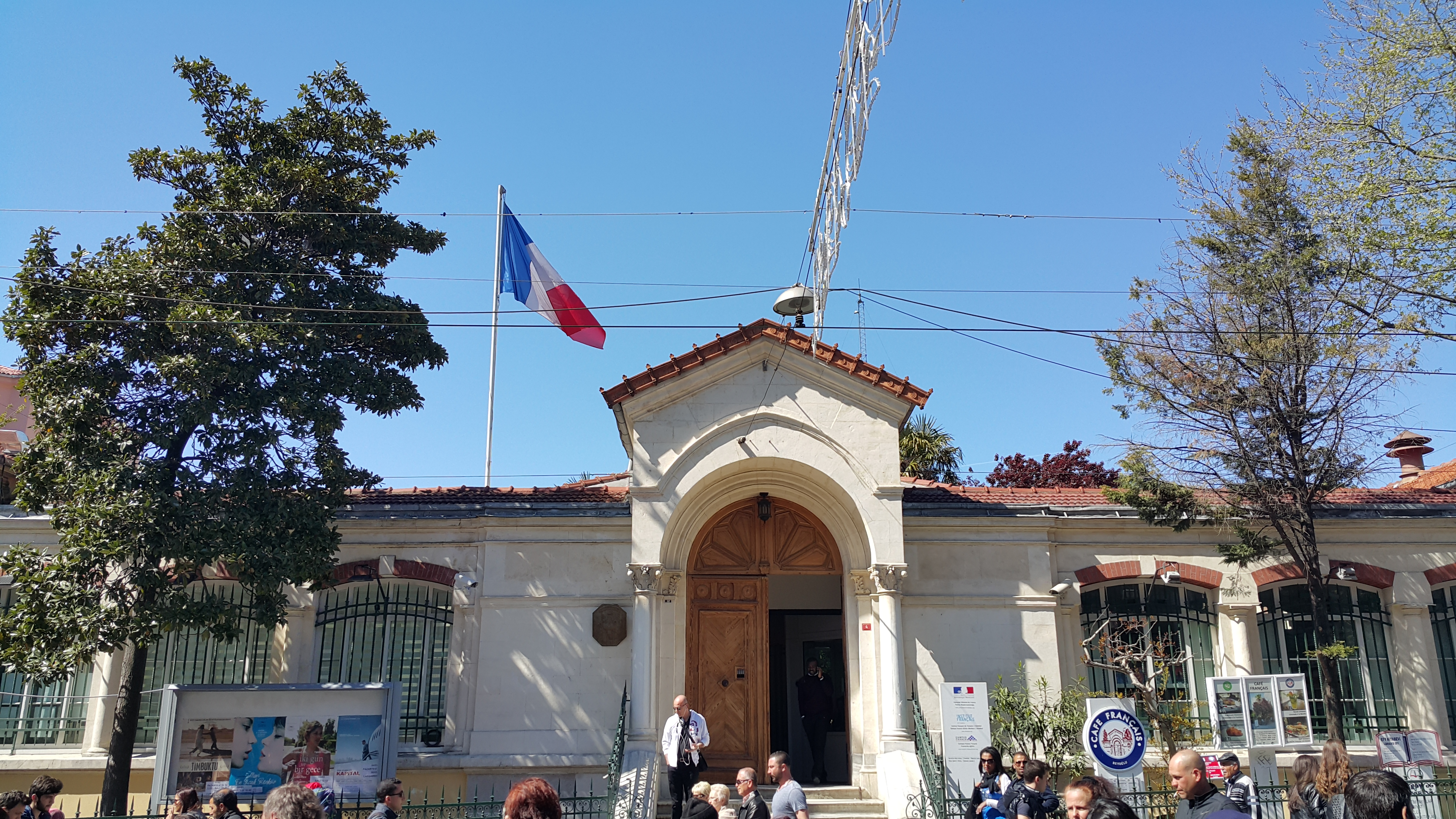
Consulate-General of France

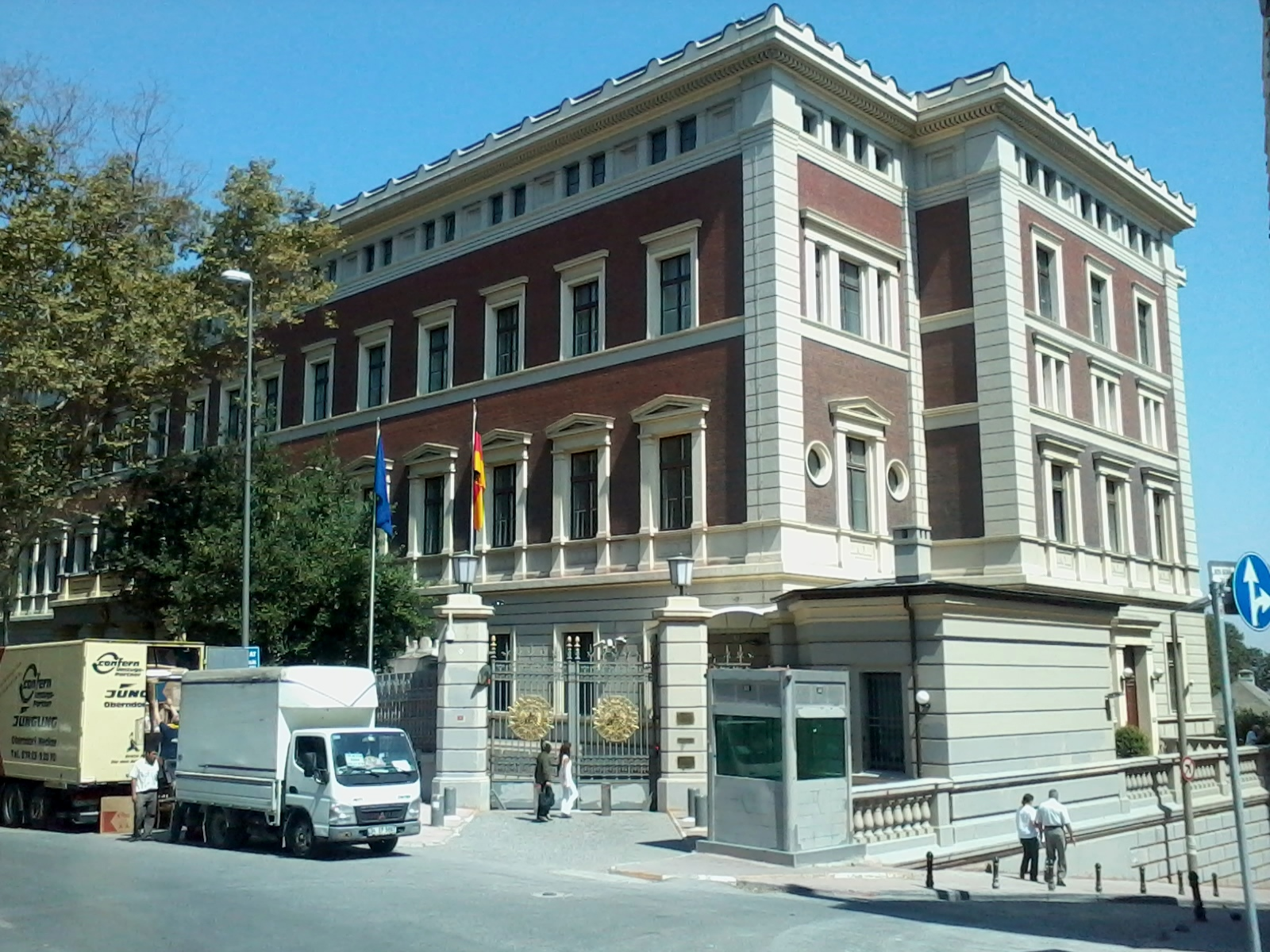
Consulate-General of Germany

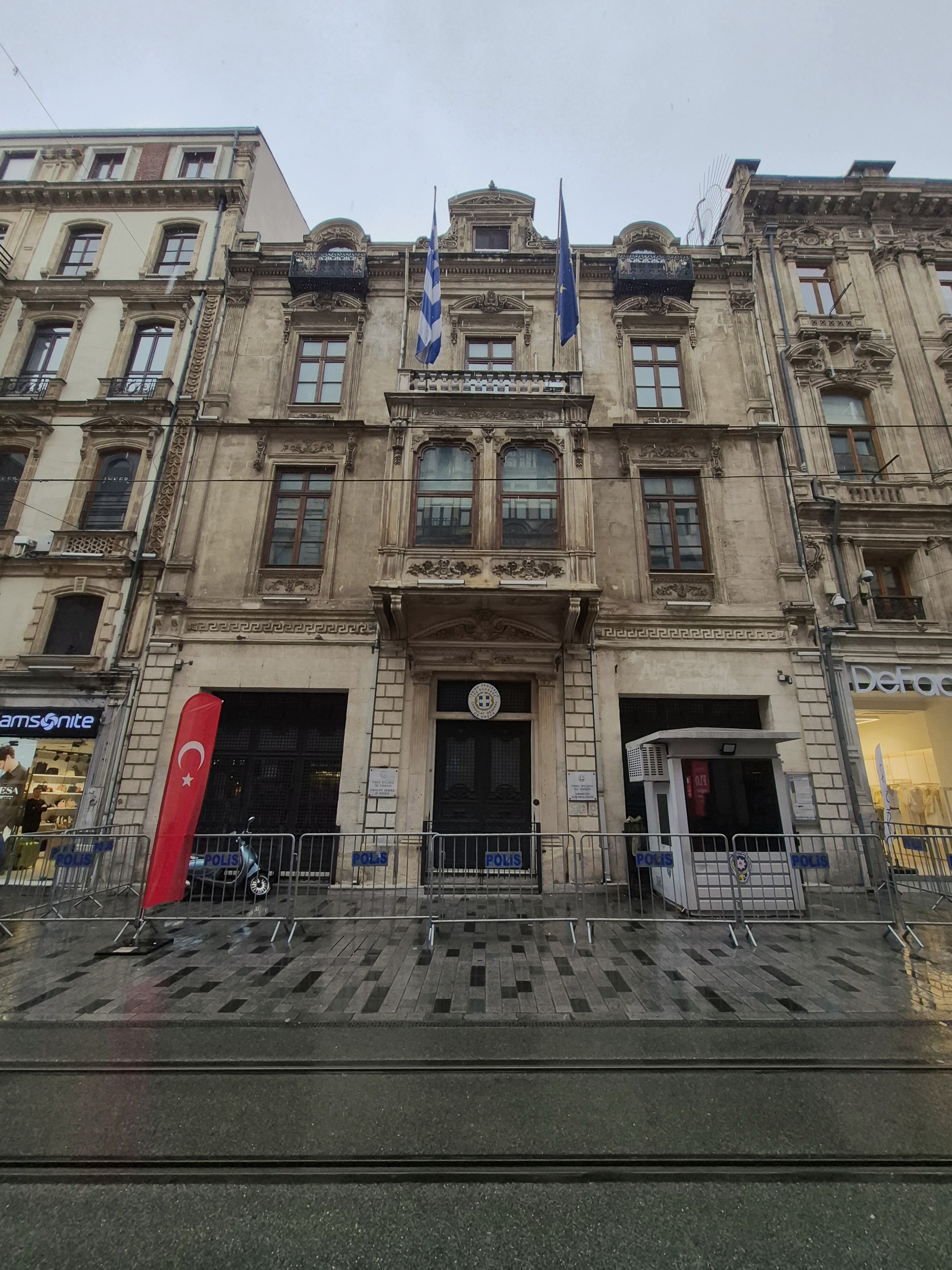
Consulate-General of Greece

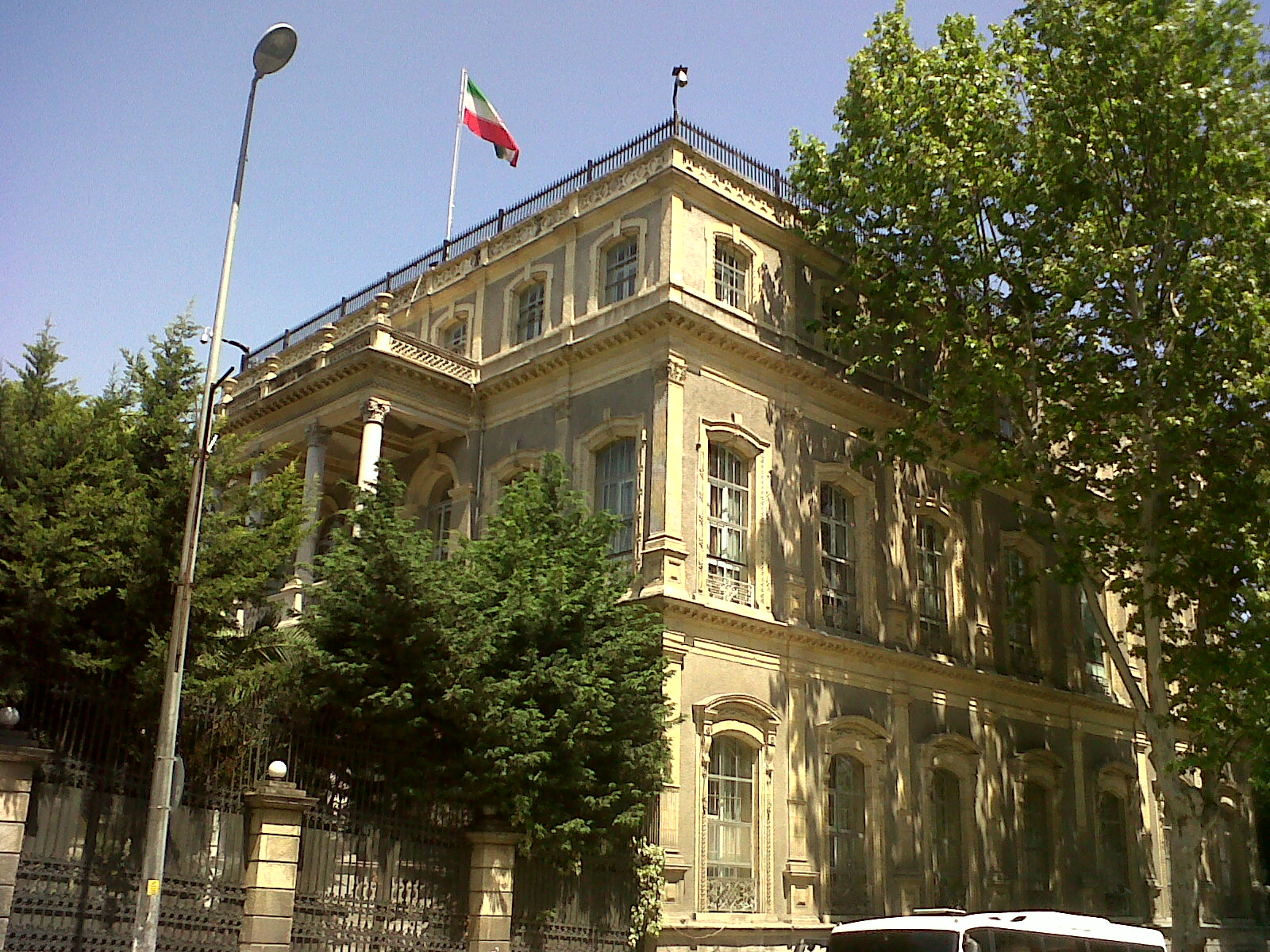
Consulate-General of Iran

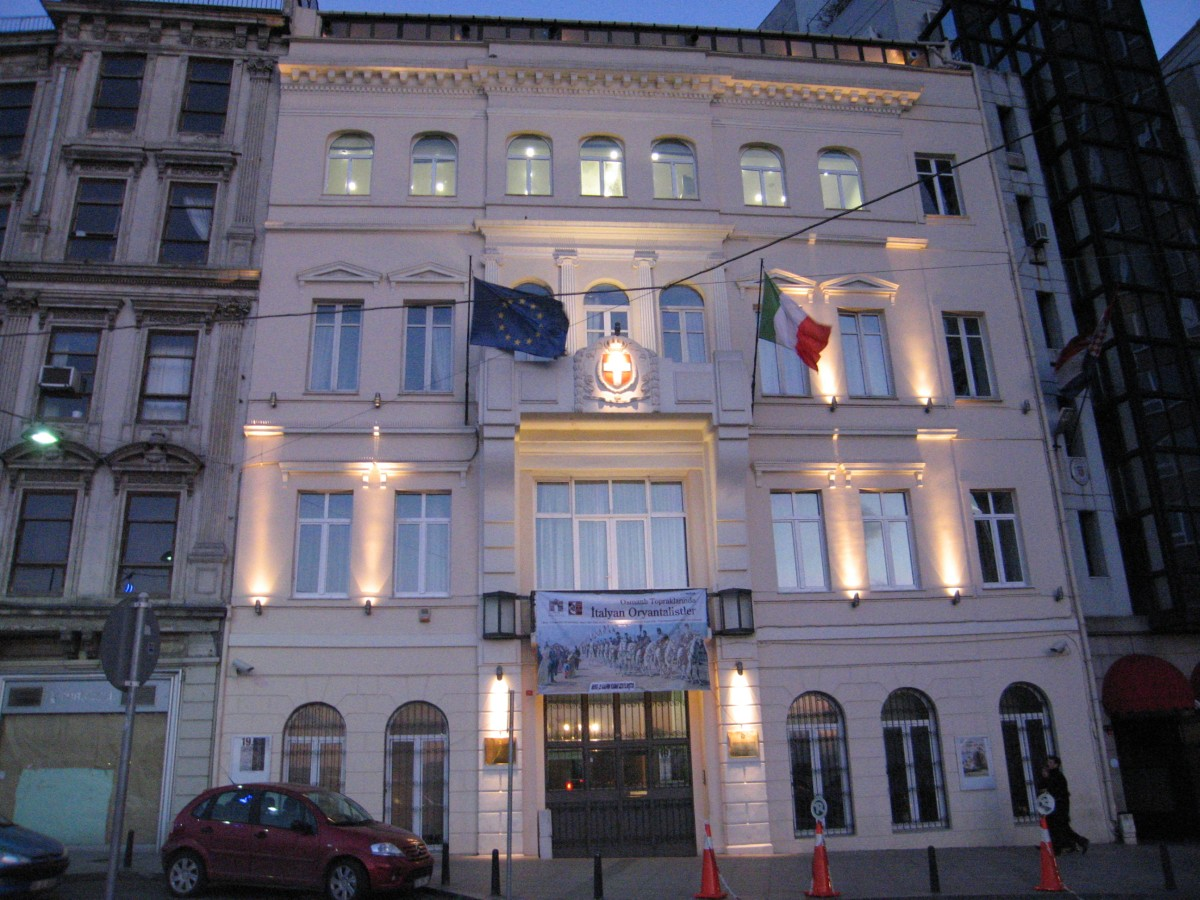
Consulate-General of Italy

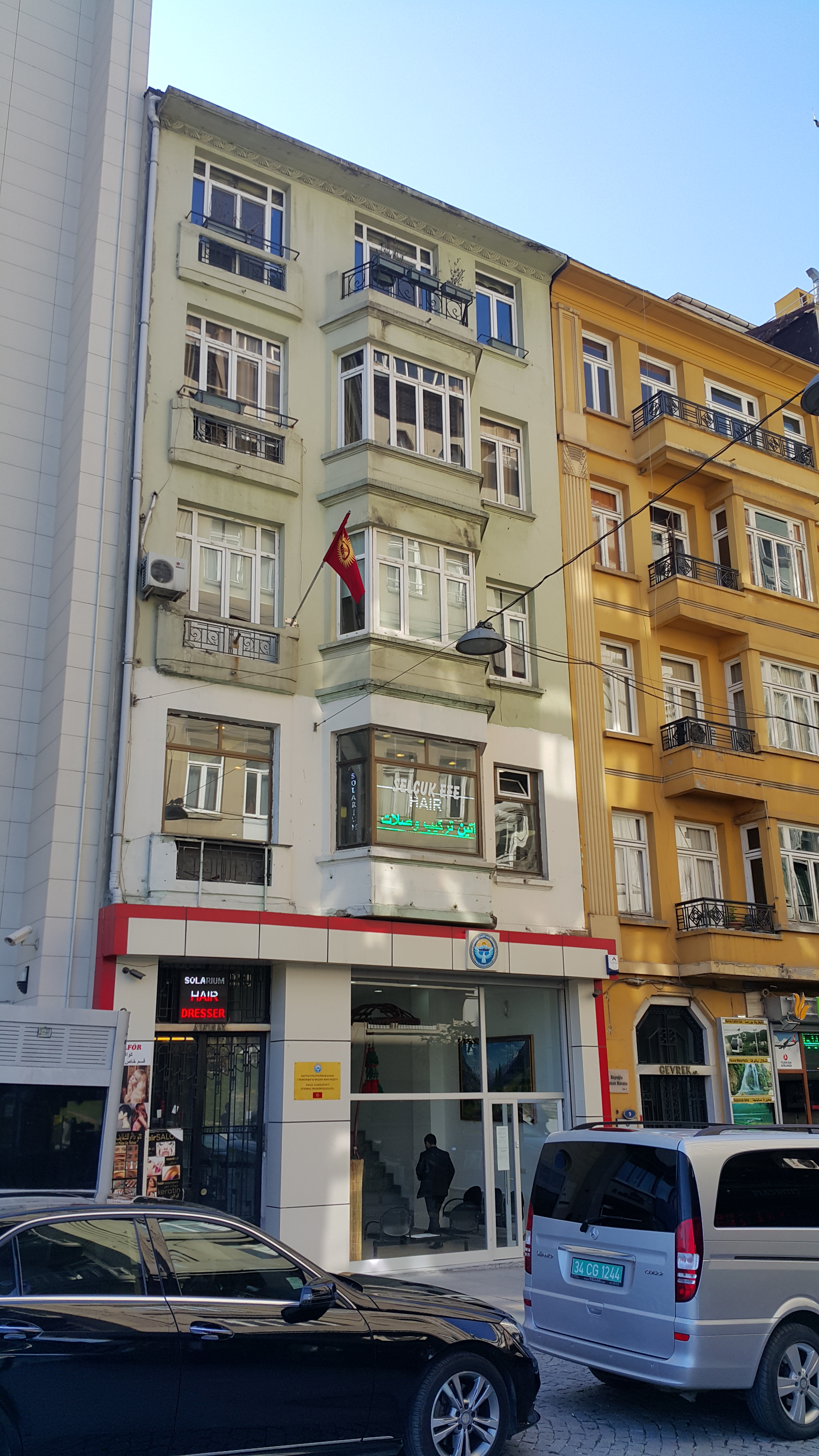
Consulate-General of Kyrgyzstan

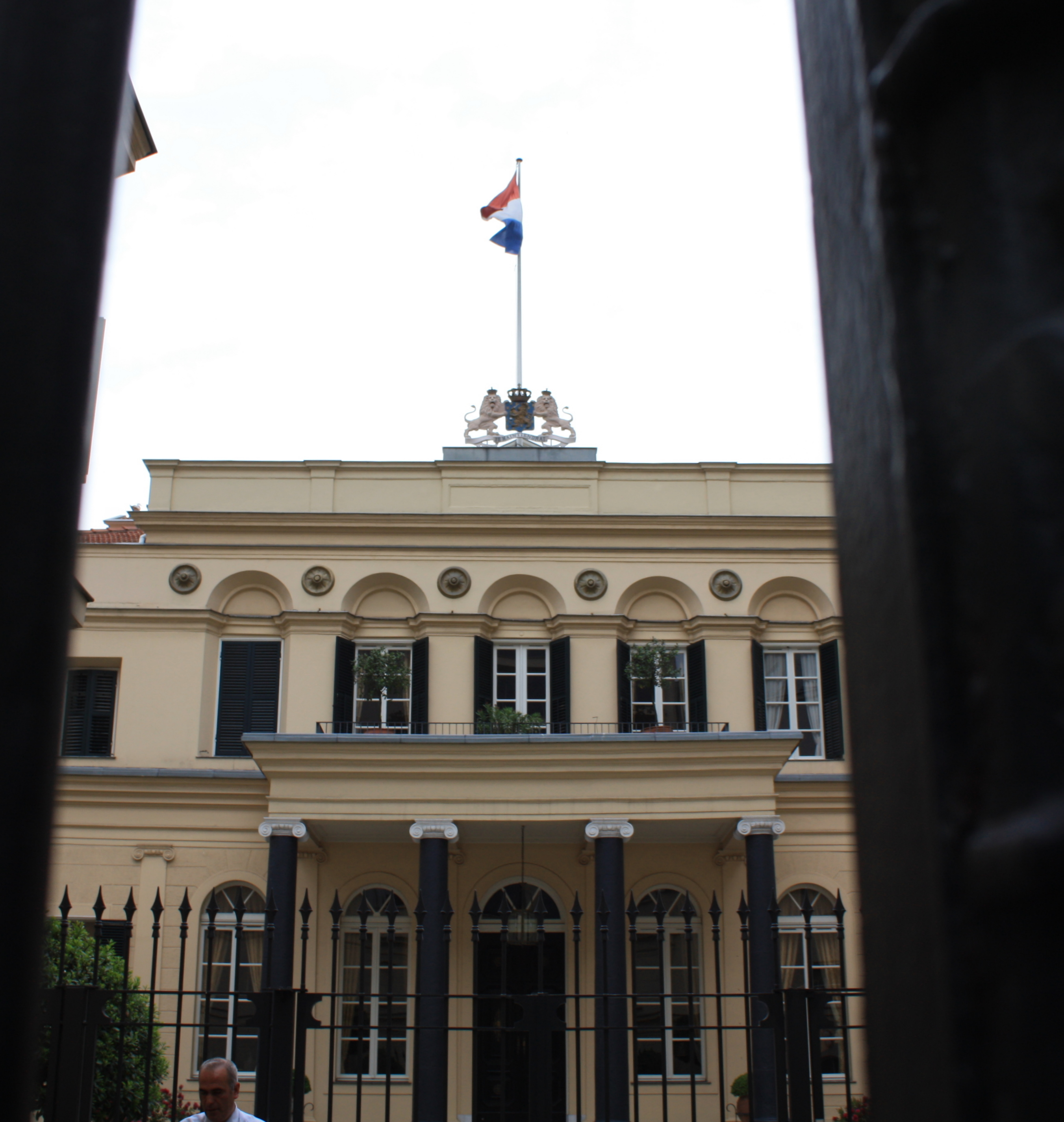
Consulate-General of Netherlands

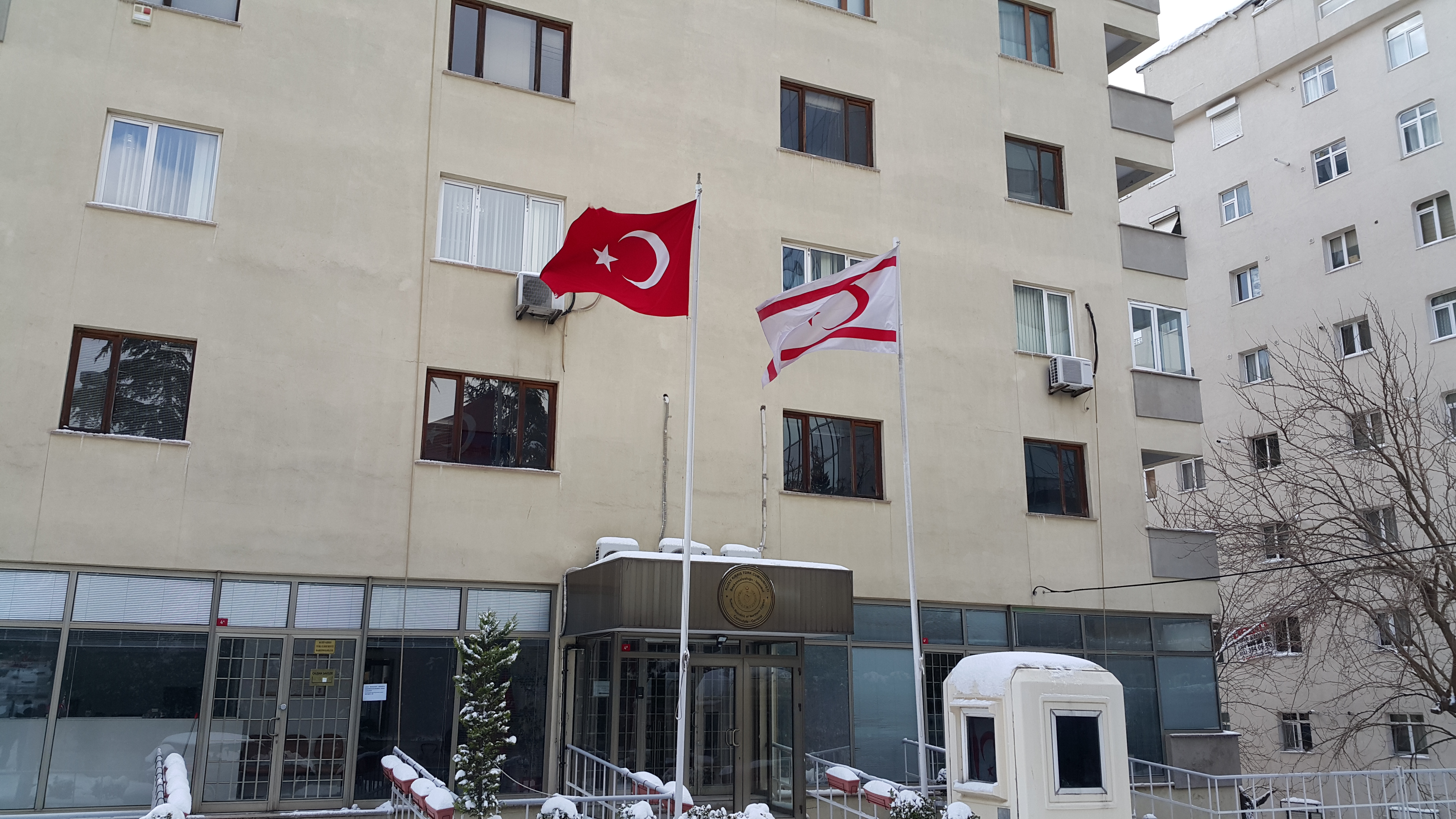
Consulate-General of Northern Cyprus

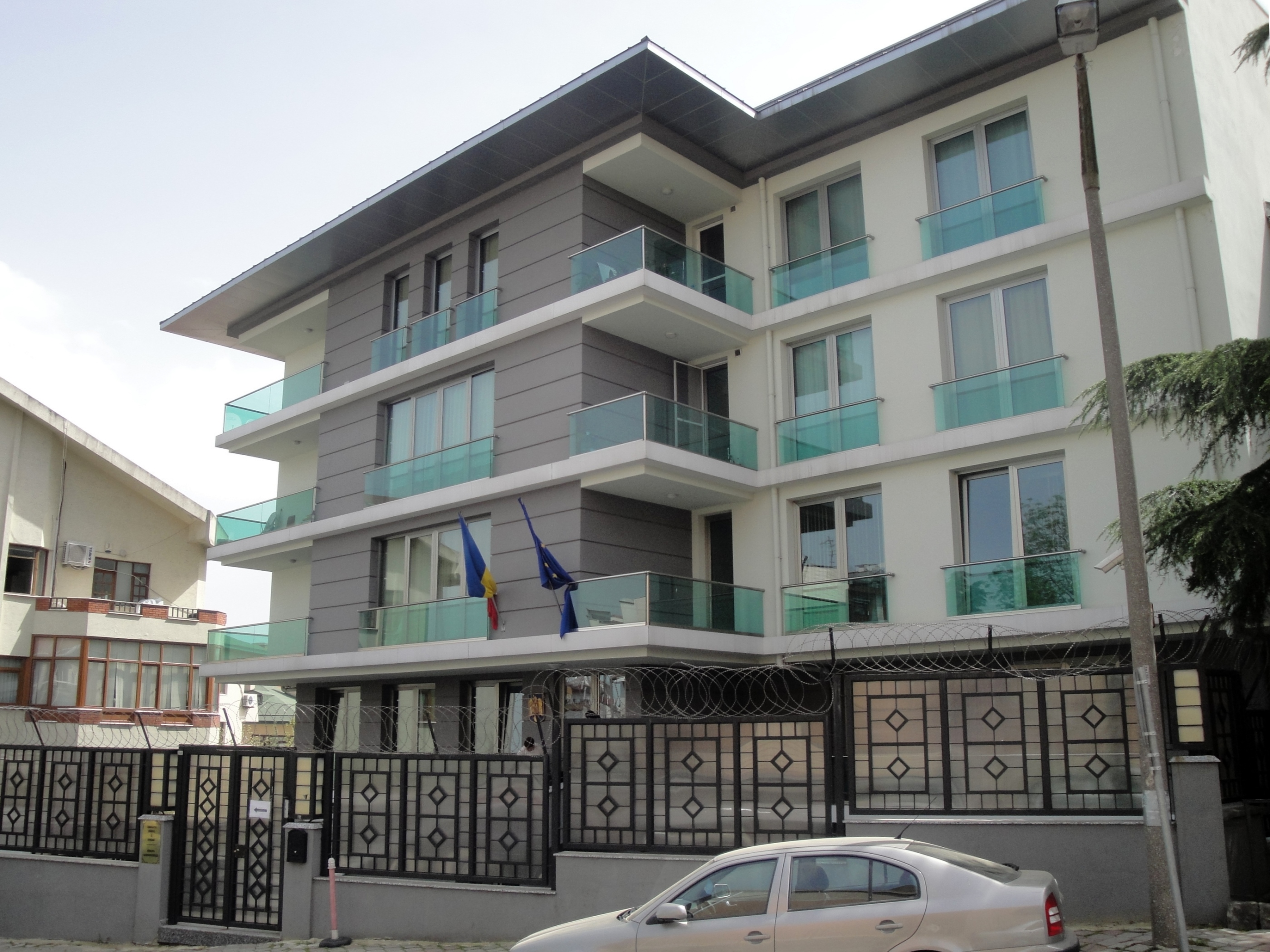
Consulate-General of Romania

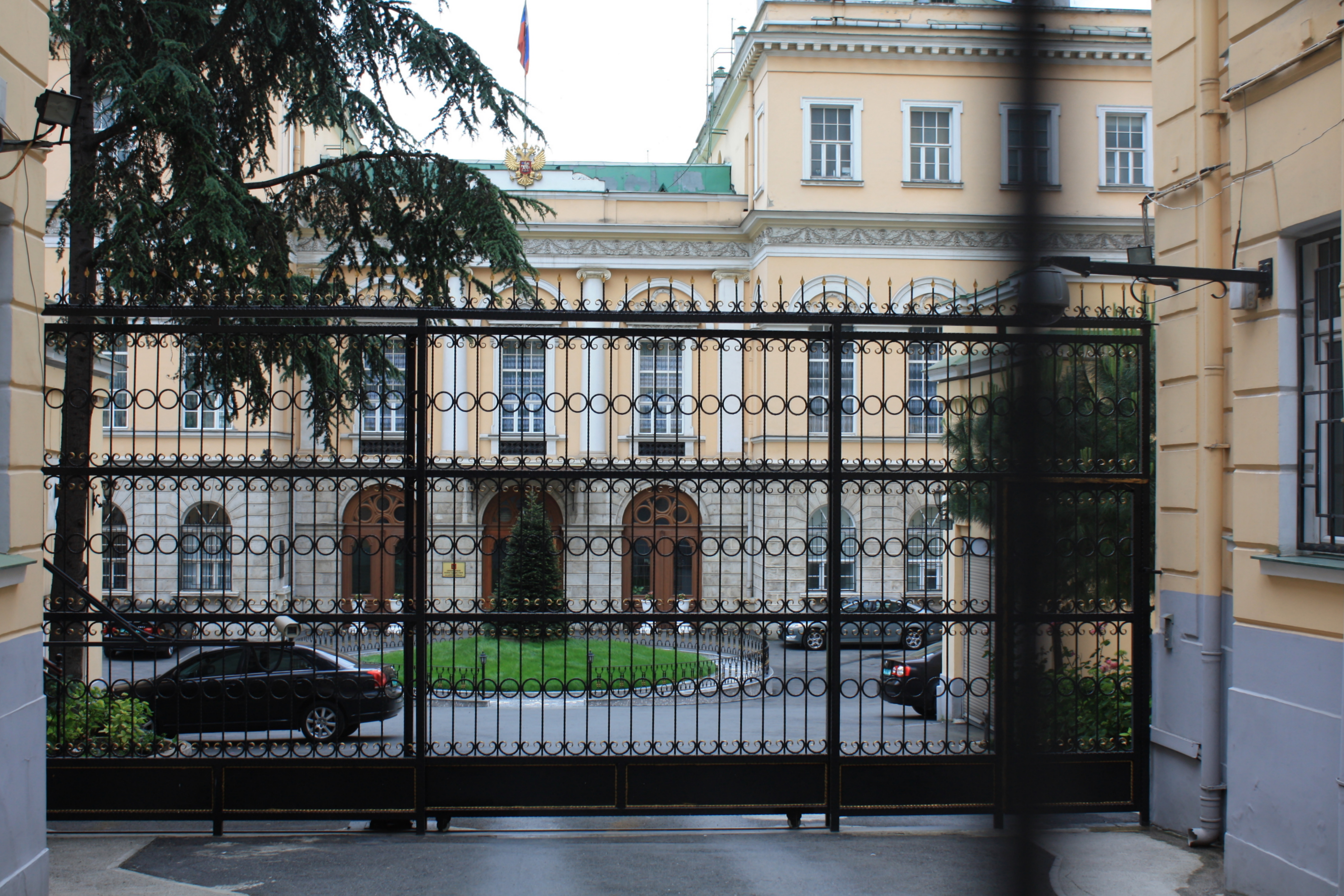
Consulate-General of Russia

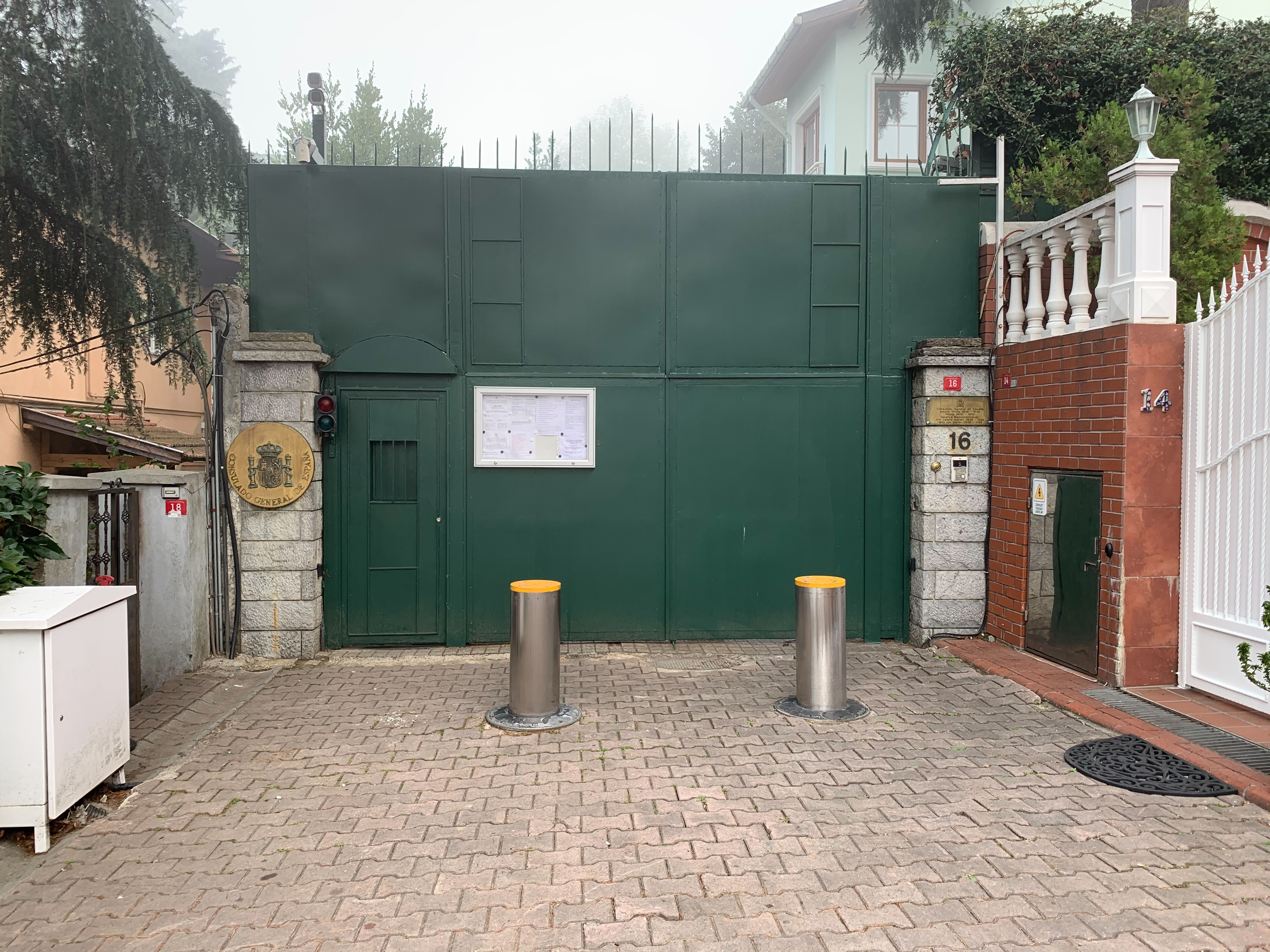
Consulate-General of Spain

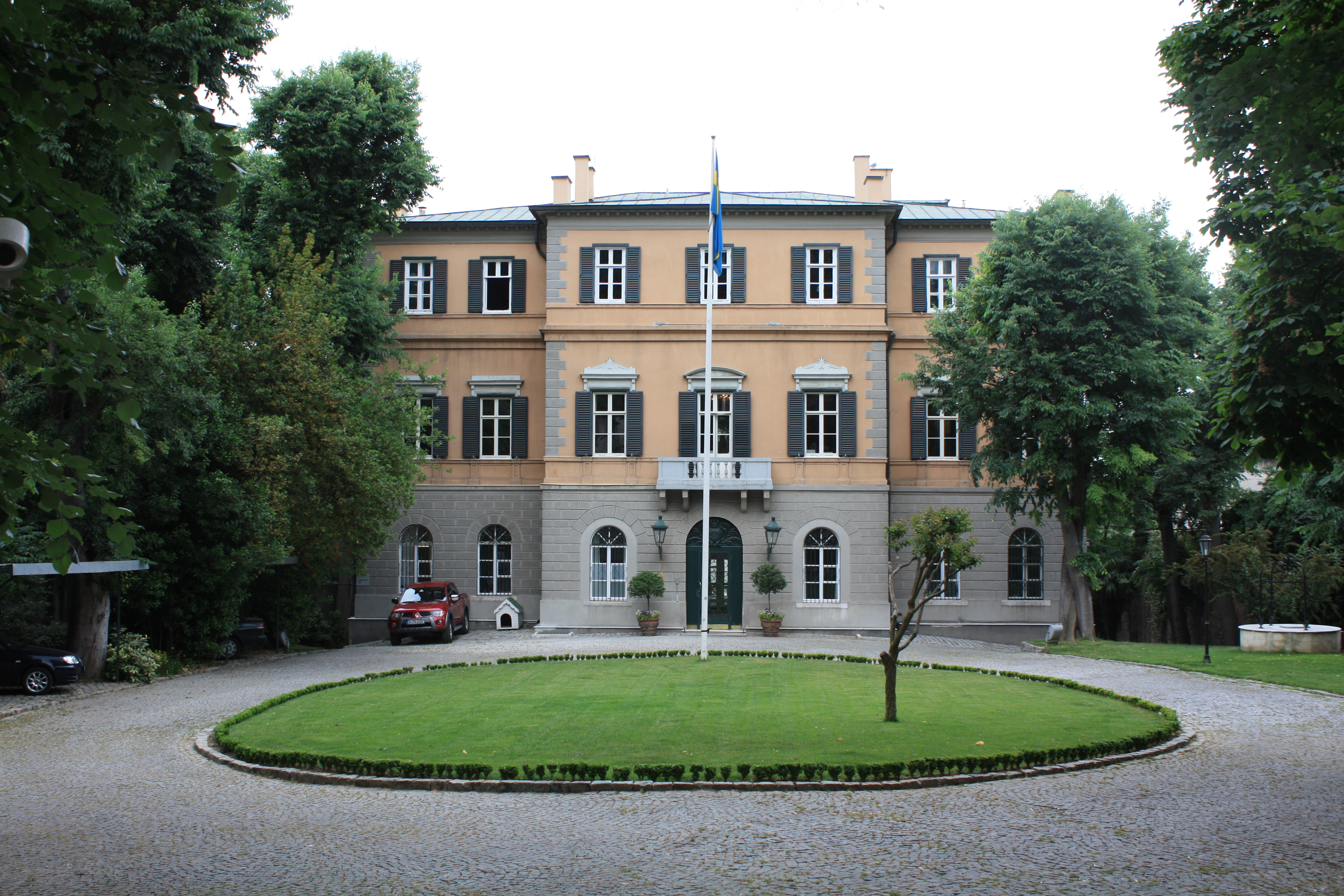
Consulate-General of Sweden

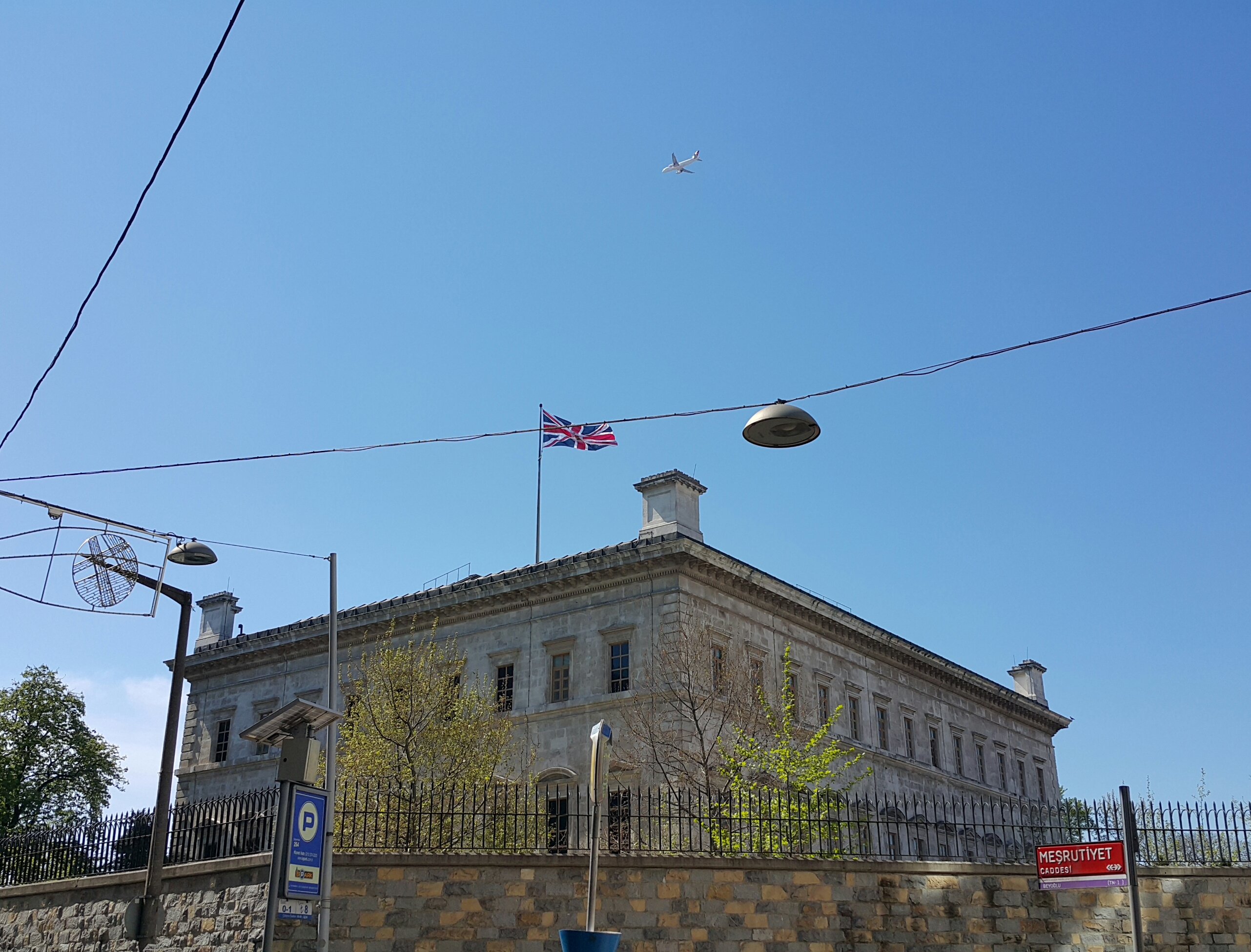
Consulate-General of the United Kingdom

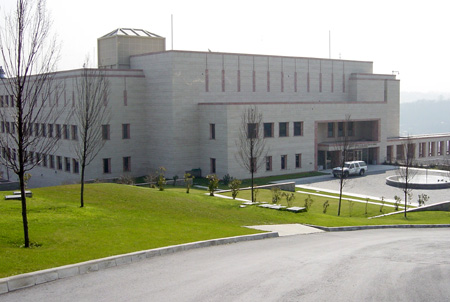
Consulate-General of the United States

=== İzmir ===
- Germany
- Greece
- Italy (Consulate)
- Northern Cyprus
- Romania
- United Kingdom (Consulate)
- United States (Consular Agency) (Note: For U.S. Citizen Services)
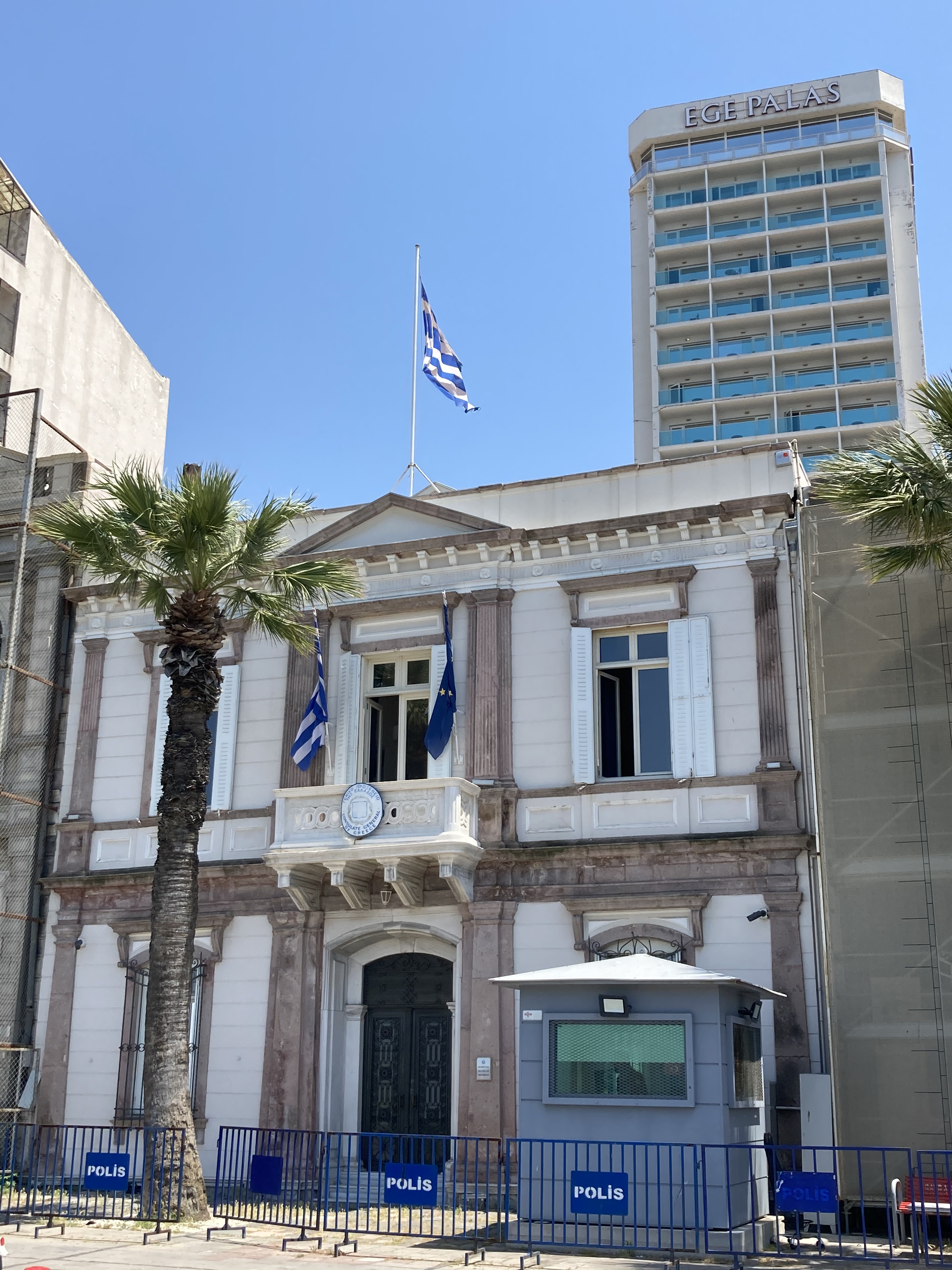
Consulate-General of Greece in İzmir

=== Kars ===
- Azerbaijan

=== Mersin ===
- Northern Cyprus

=== Trabzon ===
- Georgia
- Iran
- Northern Cyprus
- Russia

== Accredited non-resident diplomatic and consular missions ==
Resident in Berlin, Germany

- Haiti
- Honduras
- Malawi
- Mauritius
- Namibia

Resident in Brussels, Belgium

- Antigua and Barbuda
- Barbados
- Belize
- Eswatini
- Saint Kitts and Nevis
- Saint Lucia
- Saint Vincent and the Grenadines
- Timor-Leste
- Trinidad and Tobago
- Vanuatu

Resident in Cairo, Egypt

- Comoros
- Myanmar

Resident in Canberra, Australia

- Tuvalu
- Tonga

Resident in New York City, United States

- Federated States of Micronesia
- Marshall Islands
- Nauru

Resident in Paris, France

- Central African Republic
- Seychelles

Resident in Rome, Italy

- Cape Verde
- Lesotho
- Madagascar
- Mozambique

Resident in Switzerland

- Botswana (Geneva)
- Liechtenstein (Bern)

Other resident cities

- Eritrea (Doha)
- Grenada (Moscow)
- Iceland (Copenhagen)
- Laos (Vienna)
- Nepal (Islamabad)
- North Korea (Sofia)
- Palau (Tokyo)

== Missions to open ==
Host city	Sending country	Mission	Ref.
Ankara	Central African Republic	Embassy	
Ankara	Laos	Embassy	
Ankara	Mozambique	Embassy	

== Closed missions ==
Host city	Sending country	Mission	Year closed	Ref.
Ankara	Benin	Embassy	2020	
Ankara	Cyprus	Embassy	1974	
Ankara	East Germany	Embassy (Note: East German embassy closed, due to the reunification of Germany.)	1990	
Ankara	South Vietnam	Embassy (Note: The South Vietnamese embassy was closed upon the fall of Saigon in April 1975, thus marking the end of the Vietnam War and the start of a transition period to the formal reunification of Vietnam.)	1975	
Istanbul	Chad	Consulate-General	2025	
İzmir	China	Consulate-General	2019	
İzmir	United States	Consulate-General	1993	

== See also ==
- Foreign relations of Turkey
- List of diplomatic missions of Turkey
- Visa requirements for Turkish citizens
