= VA255 =

VA255 may refer to:

- Ariane flight VA255, an Ariane 5 launch
- Virgin Australia flight 255, with IATA flight number VA255
- Virginia State Route 255 (SR 255 or VA-255), a primary state highway in the United States
