= July 5 =

July 5 this year in various calendars
- Sunday, 5 July 2026
Other calendars
| Akan | Nwonakwasi |
| Armenian | 20 Hrotich 1475 |
| Aztec | Tepeilhuitl 16, 8 Cuetzpalin |
| Babylonian | 19 Simanu, 2337 SE |
| Balinese pawukon | Menga, Beteng, Laba, Pon, Aryang, Redite of Medangsia, Indra, Tulus, Suka |
| Bengali | 21 Asharh, BS 1433 |
| Chinese | Yang Metal Dragon・Emptiness Mansion; 21 Wǔyuè, Bǐngwǔnián (Xiazhi, 2 days until Xiaoshu) |
| Common Era | 5 July 2026 CE |
| Coptic | 28 Paoni, AM 1742 |
| Egyptian | 20 Athyr, 2775 NE |
| Ethiopian | 28 Sanē, 2018 Amätä Məhrät |
| French Republican | Décade II, Septidi de Messidor de l'Année 234 de la République |
| Gregorian | 5 July, AD 2026 |
| Hebrew | 20 Tammuz, AM 5786 |
| Hindu | Śatabhiṣaj・Ayuṣmān; Solar: 21 Āṣāḍha, 1948 SE; Lunisolar: Pañcamī, Kṛishna pakṣa of Jyeṣṭha, 2083 VE; Rāudra・5127 KY・1,872,761 |
| Icelandic | Sunnudagur, 14 Sólmánuður 2026 |
| Islamic | 19 Muharram, AH 1448 (using tabular method) |
| ISO week date | 2026-W27-7 |
| Japanese | 21 Satsuki, Reiwa 8 (Geshi, 2 days until Shōsho) |
| Julian | 22 June, AD 2026 (AM 7534) |
| Julian day | 2461227 |
| Maya | 13.0.13.13.4; 17 Tzec, 8 Kan |
| Roman | ante diem X Kalendas Iulias, MMDCCLXXIX AUC |
| Solar Hijri | 14 Tir, SH 1405 |
| Tibetan | 20 snron, me pho rta 2153 or 1772 or 1000 |

| << | July | | | | | >> |
| Su | Mo | Tu | We | Th | Fr | Sa |
| | | | 1 | 2 | 3 | 4 |
| 5 | 6 | 7 | 8 | 9 | 10 | 11 |
| 12 | 13 | 14 | 15 | 16 | 17 | 18 |
| 19 | 20 | 21 | 22 | 23 | 24 | 25 |
| 26 | 27 | 28 | 29 | 30 | 31 |
2026

July 5 in recent years
2026 (Sunday)
2025 (Saturday)
2024 (Friday)
2023 (Wednesday)
2022 (Tuesday)
2021 (Monday)
2020 (Sunday)
2019 (Friday)
2018 (Thursday)
2017 (Wednesday)

July 5 is the 186th day of the year (187th in leap years) in the Gregorian calendar; 179 days remain until the end of the year.

== Events ==
=== Pre-1600 ===
- 328 – The official opening of Constantine's Bridge built over the Danube between Sucidava (Corabia, Romania) and Oescus (Gigen, Bulgaria) by the Roman architect Theophilus Patricius.
- 1294 – Election of pope Celestine V following the death of pope Nicholas IV two years prior.
- 1316 – The Burgundian and Majorcan claimants of the Principality of Achaea meet in the Battle of Manolada.
- 1413 – Mehmed Çelebi and his army defeat the army of his brother Musa Çelebi in the battle of Çamurlu. Musa is captured and executed.
- 1584 – The Maronite College is established in Rome.
- 1594 – Portuguese forces under the command of Pedro Lopes de Sousa begin an unsuccessful invasion of the Kingdom of Kandy during the Campaign of Danture in Sri Lanka.

=== 1601–1900 ===
- 1610 – John Guy sets sail from Bristol with 39 other colonists for Newfoundland.
- 1643 – The battle of Landsdowne results in severe losses for both the Royalist and Parliamentarian forces.
- 1687 – Isaac Newton publishes Philosophiæ Naturalis Principia Mathematica.
- 1770 – The Battle of Chesma between the Russian Empire and the Ottoman Empire begins, resulting in one of the worst naval defeats of the Ottomans since Lepanto.
- 1775 – The Second Continental Congress adopts the Olive Branch Petition.
- 1803 – The Convention of Artlenburg is signed, leading to the French occupation of the Electorate of Hanover (which had been ruled by the British king).
- 1807 – In Buenos Aires the local militias repel the British soldiers within the Second English Invasion.
- 1809 – The Battle of Wagram between the French and Austrian Empires begins.
- 1811 – The Venezuelan Declaration of Independence is adopted by a congress of the provinces.
- 1813 – War of 1812: Three weeks of British raids on Fort Schlosser, Black Rock and Plattsburgh, New York commence.
- 1814 – War of 1812: Battle of Chippawa: American Major General Jacob Brown defeats British General Phineas Riall at Chippawa, Ontario.
- 1830 – After inflicting a series of defeats on Algerian forces, the French army under the Comte de Bourmont captures Algier.
- 1833 – Lê Văn Khôi along with 27 soldiers stage a mutiny taking over the Phiên An citadel, developing into the Lê Văn Khôi revolt against Emperor Minh Mạng.
- 1833 – Admiral Charles Napier vanquishes the navy of the Portuguese usurper Dom Miguel at the third Battle of Cape St. Vincent.
- 1841 – Thomas Cook organises the first package excursion, from Leicester to Loughborough.
- 1852 – Abolitionist Frederick Douglass delivers his "What to the Slave Is the Fourth of July?" speech at a meeting organized by the Rochester Ladies' Anti-Slavery Society in Rochester, New York.
- 1859 – The United States discovers and claims Midway Atoll.
- 1865 – The United States Secret Service begins operation.
- 1884 – Germany takes possession of Cameroon.

=== 1901–present ===
- 1915 – The Liberty Bell leaves Philadelphia by special train on its way to the Panama–Pacific International Exposition. This is the last trip outside Philadelphia that the custodians of the bell intend to permit.
- 1934 – "Bloody Thursday": The police open fire on striking longshoremen in San Francisco.
- 1935 – The National Labor Relations Act, which governs labor relations in the United States, is signed into law by President Franklin D. Roosevelt.
- 1940 – World War II: Foreign relations of Vichy France are severed with the United Kingdom.
- 1941 – World War II: Operation Barbarossa: German troops reach the Dnieper river.
- 1943 – World War II: An Allied invasion fleet sails for Sicily (Operation Husky, July 10, 1943).
- 1943 – World War II: German forces begin a massive offensive against the Soviet Union at the Battle of Kursk, also known as Operation Citadel.
- 1945 – The United Kingdom holds its first general election in 10 years, which would be won by Clement Attlee's Labour Party.
- 1946 – Micheline Bernardini models the first modern bikini at a swimming pool in Paris.
- 1948 – National Health Service Acts create the national public health system in the United Kingdom.
- 1950 – Korean War: Task Force Smith: American and North Korean forces first clash, in the Battle of Osan.
- 1950 – The Knesset of Israel passes the Law of Return which grants all Jews the right to immigrate to the Land of Israel.
- 1954 – The BBC broadcasts its first daily television news bulletin.
- 1954 – Elvis Presley records his first single, "That's All Right", at Sun Records in Memphis, Tennessee.
- 1962 – The official independence of Algeria is proclaimed after an eight-year-long war with France.
- 1970 – Air Canada Flight 621 crashes in Brampton, Ontario, Canada, killing all 109 people on board.
- 1971 – The Twenty-sixth Amendment to the United States Constitution, lowering the voting age from 21 to 18 years, is formally certified by President Richard Nixon.
- 1973 – A boiling liquid expanding vapor explosion (BLEVE) in Kingman, Arizona, following a fire that broke out as propane was being transferred from a railroad car to a storage tank, kills eleven firefighters.
- 1973 – Juvénal Habyarimana seizes power over Rwanda in a coup d'état.
- 1975 – Arthur Ashe becomes the first black man to win the Wimbledon singles title.
- 1975 – Cape Verde gains its independence from Portugal.
- 1977 – The Pakistan Armed Forces under Muhammad Zia-ul-Haq seize power in Operation Fair Play and begin 11 years of martial law. Zulfikar Ali Bhutto, the first elected Prime Minister of Pakistan, is overthrown.
- 1980 – Swedish tennis player Björn Borg wins his fifth Wimbledon final and becomes the first male tennis player to win the championships five times in a row (1976–1980).
- 1984 – The United States Supreme Court gives its United States v. Leon decision providing a good-faith exception from the Fourth Amendment exclusionary rule against use of evidence obtained through defective warrants in criminal trials.
- 1987 – Sri Lankan Civil War: The LTTE uses suicide attacks on the Sri Lankan Army for the first time. The Black Tigers are born and, in the following years, will continue to kill with the tactic.
- 1989 – Iran–Contra affair: Oliver North is sentenced by U.S. District Judge Gerhard A. Gesell to a three-year suspended prison term, two years probation, $150,000 in fines and 1,200 hours community service. His convictions are later overturned.
- 1994 – Jeff Bezos founds Amazon.
- 1995 – Armenia adopts its constitution, four years after its independence from the Soviet Union.
- 1996 – Dolly the sheep becomes the first mammal cloned from an adult cell.
- 1997 – Sri Lankan Civil War: Sri Lankan Tamil MP A. Thangathurai is shot dead at Sri Shanmuga Hindu Ladies College in Trincomalee.
- 1999 – U.S. President Bill Clinton imposes trade and economic sanctions against the Taliban regime in Afghanistan.
- 2003 – The World Health Organization announces that the 2002–2004 SARS outbreak has been contained.
- 2004 – The first direct Indonesian presidential election is held.
- 2006 – North Korea tests four short-range missiles, one medium-range missile and a long-range Taepodong-2. The long-range Taepodong-2 reportedly fails in mid-air over the Sea of Japan.
- 2009 – A series of violent riots break out in Ürümqi, the capital city of the Xinjiang Uyghur Autonomous Region in China.
- 2009 – The Staffordshire Horde, the largest hoard of Anglo-Saxon gold ever discovered in Britain, is found near the village of Hammerwich, near Lichfield, Staffordshire.
- 2012 – The Shard in London is inaugurated as the tallest building in Europe, with a height of 310 metres (1,020 ft).
- 2016 – The Juno space probe arrives at Jupiter and begins a 20-month survey of the planet.
- 2022 – British government ministers Sajid Javid and Rishi Sunak resign from the second Johnson ministry, beginning the July 2022 United Kingdom government crisis.
- 2023 – The last Ariane 5 rocket is launched, carrying the Heinrich Hertz and Syracuse 4B satellites.
- 2024 – Keir Starmer is appointed Prime Minister by Charles III, becoming the first Labour prime minister since Gordon Brown in 2010 and the first one to win a general election since Tony Blair at the 2005 general election.

== Births ==
=== Pre-1600 ===
- 465 – Ahkal Moʼ Nahb I, Mayan ruler (died 524)
- 980 – Mokjong of Goryeo, Korean king (died 1009)
- 1029 – Al-Mustansir Billah, Fatimid caliph (died 1094)
- 1321 – Joan of the Tower, English consort of David II of Scotland (died 1362)
- 1466 – Giovanni Sforza, Italian nobleman (died 1510)
- 1547 – Garzia de' Medici, Tuscan son of Cosimo I de' Medici, Grand Duke of Tuscany (died 1562)
- 1549 – Francesco Maria del Monte, Italian cardinal and art collector (died 1627)
- 1554 – Elisabeth of Austria, French queen (died 1592)
- 1580 – Carlo Contarini, doge of Venice (died 1656)
- 1586 – Thomas Hooker, English-born founder of the Colony of Connecticut (died 1647)
- 1593 – Achille d'Étampes de Valençay, French military leader (died 1646)

=== 1601–1900 ===
- 1653 – Thomas Pitt, English businessman and politician (died 1726)
- 1670 – Dorothea Sophie of Neuburg, countess palatine (died 1748)
- 1675 – Mary Walcott, American accuser and witness at the Salem witch trials (died 1719)
- 1709 – Étienne de Silhouette, French translator and politician, Controller-General of Finances (died 1767)
- 1717 – Peter III, Portuguese king (died 1786)
- 1718 – Francis Seymour-Conway, 1st Marquess of Hertford, English politician, Lord Lieutenant of Ireland (died 1794)
- 1745 – Carl Arnold Kortum, German physician and poet (died 1824)
- 1755 – Sarah Siddons, English actress (died 1831)
- 1780 – François Carlo Antommarchi, French physician (died 1838)
- 1781 – Stamford Raffles, English politician, founded Singapore (died 1826)
- 1793 – Pavel Pestel, Russian officer (died 1826)
- 1794 – Sylvester Graham, American minister and activist (died 1851)
- 1801 – David Farragut, American admiral (died 1870)
- 1802 – Pavel Nakhimov, Russian admiral (died 1855)
- 1803 – George Borrow, British writer (died 1881)
- 1805 – Robert FitzRoy, English captain, meteorologist, and politician, 2nd Governor of New Zealand (died 1865)
- 1810 – P. T. Barnum, American businessman, co-founded Ringling Bros. and Barnum & Bailey Circus (died 1891)
- 1820 – William John Macquorn Rankine, Scottish physicist, mathematician, and engineer (died 1872)
- 1829 – Ignacio Mariscal, Mexican politician and diplomat, Secretary of Foreign Affairs for Mexico (died 1910)
- 1832 – Pavel Chistyakov, Russian painter and educator (died 1919)
- 1841 – William Collins Whitney, American financier and politician, 31st United States Secretary of the Navy (died 1904)
- 1849 – William Thomas Stead, English journalist (died 1912)
- 1853 – Cecil Rhodes, English-South African businessman and politician, 6th Prime Minister of the Cape Colony (died 1902)
- 1857 – Clara Zetkin, German theorist and activist (died 1933)
- 1857 – Julien Tiersot, French musicologist and composer (died 1936)
- 1860 – Robert Bacon, American colonel and politician, 39th United States Secretary of State (died 1919)
- 1860 – Mathieu Jaboulay, French surgeon (died 1913)
- 1862 – George Nuttall, American-British bacteriologist (died 1937)
- 1862 – Horatio Caro, English chess master (died 1920)
- 1864 – Stephan Krehl, German composer (died 1924)
- 1867 – A. E. Douglass, American astronomer (died 1962)
- 1872 – Édouard Herriot, French lawyer and politician, Prime Minister of France (died 1957)
- 1874 – Eugen Fischer, German physician and academic (died 1967)
- 1879 – Dwight F. Davis, American tennis player and politician, 49th United States Secretary of War (died 1945)
- 1879 – Wanda Landowska, Polish-French harpsichord player and educator (died 1959)
- 1880 – Jan Kubelík, Czech violinist and composer (died 1940)
- 1880 – Constantin Tănase, Romanian actor and playwright (died 1945)
- 1882 – Inayat Khan, Indian mystic and educator (died 1927)
- 1883 – Gustave Lanctot, Canadian historian, author, and academic (died 1975)
- 1884 – Enrico Dante, Italian cardinal (died 1967)
- 1885 – Blas Infante, Spanish historian and politician (died 1936)
- 1885 – André Lhote, French sculptor and painter (died 1962)
- 1886 – Willem Drees, Dutch politician and historian, Prime Minister of the Netherlands (1948–1958) (died 1988)
- 1886 – Prince John Konstantinovich of Russia (died 1918)
- 1888 – Herbert Spencer Gasser, American physiologist and academic, Nobel Prize laureate (died 1963)
- 1888 – Louise Freeland Jenkins, American astronomer and academic (died 1970)
- 1889 – Jean Cocteau, French novelist, poet, and playwright (died 1963)
- 1890 – Frederick Lewis Allen, American historian and journalist (died 1954)
- 1891 – John Howard Northrop, American chemist and academic, Nobel Prize laureate (died 1987)
- 1891 – Tin Ujević, Croatian poet and translator (died 1955)
- 1893 – Anthony Berkeley Cox, English writer (died 1971)
- 1893 – Giuseppe Caselli, Italian painter (died 1976)
- 1894 – Ants Lauter, Estonian actor and director (died 1973)
- 1896 – Thomas Playford IV, Australian politician, 33rd Premier of South Australia (died 1981)
- 1898 – Georgios Grivas, Greek general (died 1974)
- 1899 – Marcel Achard, French playwright, screenwriter, and author (died 1974)
- 1900 – Yoshimaro Yamashina, Japanese ornithologist, founded the Yamashina Institute for Ornithology (died 1989)
- 1900 – Bernardus Johannes Alfrink, Dutch cardinal (died 1987)

=== 1901–present ===
- 1901 – Julio Libonatti, Italian-Argentinian footballer (died 1981)
- 1902 – Henry Cabot Lodge Jr., American colonel and politician, 3rd United States Ambassador to the United Nations (died 1985)
- 1904 – Harold Acton, English scholar and author (died 1994)
- 1904 – Ernst Mayr, German-American biologist and ornithologist (died 2005)
- 1904 – Milburn Stone, American actor (died 1980)
- 1905 – Madeleine Sylvain-Bouchereau, Haitian sociologist and educator (died 1970)
- 1908 – Henri of Orléans, (died 1999)
- 1908 – Lyman S. Ayres II, American businessman (died 1996)
- 1910 – Georges Vedel, French lawyer and academic (died 2002)
- 1911 – Endel Aruja, Estonian-Canadian physicist and academic (died 2008)
- 1911 – Haydn Bunton, Sr., Australian footballer and coach (died 1955)
- 1911 – Giorgio Borġ Olivier, Maltese lawyer and politician, 7th Prime Minister of Malta (died 1980)
- 1911 – Georges Pompidou, French banker and politician, 19th President of France (died 1974)
- 1913 – George Costakis, Russian art collector (died 1990)
- 1913 – Smiley Lewis, American singer-songwriter and guitarist (died 1966)
- 1914 – John Thomas Dunlop, American administrator and labor scholar (died 2003)
- 1914 – Annie Fischer, Hungarian pianist and composer (died 1995)
- 1915 – Babe Paley, American socialite (died 1978)
- 1915 – John Woodruff, American runner and commander (died 2007)
- 1915 – Al Timothy, Trinidadian musician and songwriter (died 2000)
- 1916 – Lívia Rév, Hungarian classical pianist (died 2018)
- 1916 – Ivor Powell, Welsh footballer (died 2012)
- 1918 – K. Karunakaran, Indian lawyer and politician, 7th Chief Minister of Kerala (died 2010)
- 1918 – Brian James, Australian actor (died 2009)
- 1918 – Zakaria Mohieddin, Egyptian general and politician, 33rd Prime Minister of Egypt (died 2012)
- 1918 – George Rochberg, American composer and educator (died 2005)
- 1921 – Viktor Kulikov, Russian marshal (died 2013)
- 1921 – Nanos Valaoritis, Greek author, poet, and playwright (died 2019)
- 1923 – George Moore, Australian jockey (died 2008)
- 1923 – Mitsuye Yamada, Japanese American activist
- 1924 – János Starker, Hungarian-American cellist and educator (died 2013)
- 1924 – Edward Cassidy, Australian Roman Catholic cardinal priest (died 2021)
- 1925 – Fernando de Szyszlo, Peruvian painter and sculptor (died 2017)
- 1925 – Jean Raspail, French author and explorer (died 2020)
- 1925 – Jelesko Grancharoff, Bulgarian-Australian resistance fighter and anarchist (died 2016)
- 1926 – Diana Lynn, American actress (died 1971)
- 1928 – Pierre Mauroy, French educator and politician, Prime Minister of France (died 2013)
- 1928 – Warren Oates, American actor (died 1982)
- 1929 – Jimmy Carruthers, Australian boxer (died 1990)
- 1929 – Katherine Helmond, American actress and director (died 2019)
- 1929 – Tony Lock, English cricketer (died 1995)
- 1929 – Jovan Rašković, Serbian psychiatrist, academic, and politician (died 1992)
- 1929 – Jiří Reynek, Czech poet and graphic artist (died 2014)
- 1931 – Ismail Mahomed, South African lawyer and politician, 17th Chief Justice of South Africa (died 2000)
- 1932 – Gyula Horn, Hungarian politician, 37th Prime Minister of Hungary (died 2013)
- 1932 – Victor Navasky, American journalist, author and publisher of The Nation (died 2023)
- 1933 – Paul-Gilbert Langevin, French musicologist, critic and physicist (died 1986)
- 1935 – John Schoenherr, American illustrator (died 2010)
- 1935 – Amnon Barzel, Israeli art critic (died 2025)
- 1936 – Shirley Knight, American actress (died 2020)
- 1936 – Tommy LiPuma, American Grammy Award-winning jazz record producer and record label executive(died 2017)
- 1936 – James Mirrlees, Scottish economist and academic, Nobel Prize laureate (died 2018)
- 1937 – Nita Lowey, American politician (died 2025)
- 1938 – Ronnie Self, American singer-songwriter (died 1981)
- 1940 – Chuck Close, American painter and photographer (died 2021)
- 1941 – Epeli Nailatikau, Fijian chief, President of Fiji (died 2026)
- 1942 – Matthias Bamert, Swiss composer and conductor
- 1942 – Hannes Löhr, German footballer, coach, and manager (died 2016)
- 1943 – Curt Blefary, American baseball player and coach (died 2001)
- 1943 – Mark Cox, English tennis player, coach and sportscaster
- 1943 – Robbie Robertson, Canadian singer-songwriter, guitarist, producer, and actor (died 2023)
- 1944 – Leni Björklund, Swedish politician, 28th Swedish Minister of Defence for Sweden
- 1945 – Michael Blake, American author and screenwriter (died 2015)
- 1945 – Humberto Benítez Treviño, Mexican lawyer and politician, Attorney General of Mexico
- 1946 – Pierre-Marc Johnson, Canadian lawyer, physician, and politician, 24th Premier of Quebec
- 1946 – Paul Smith, English fashion designer
- 1946 – Gerard 't Hooft, Dutch physicist and academic, Nobel Prize laureate
- 1946 – Vladimir Mikhailovich Zakharov, Russian dancer and choreographer (died 2013)
- 1949 – Ludwig G. Strauss, German physician and academic (died 2013)
- 1949 – Jill Murphy, British children's author (died 2021)
- 1950 – Carlos Caszely, Chilean footballer
- 1950 – Huey Lewis, American singer-songwriter and actor
- 1950 – Gary Matthews, American baseball player and commentator
- 1951 – Goose Gossage, American baseball player
- 1953 – David Morrow, Australian radio host and sportscaster (died 2024)
- 1953 – Caryn Navy, American mathematician and computer scientist
- 1954 – Jimmy Crespo, American guitarist and songwriter
- 1954 – John Wright, New Zealand cricketer and coach
- 1955 – Tony Hadley, English footballer
- 1955 – Peter McNamara, Australian tennis player and coach (died 2019)
- 1956 – Horacio Cartes, Paraguayan businessman and politician, President of Paraguay
- 1957 – Carlo Thränhardt, German high jumper
- 1957 – Doug Wilson, Canadian-American ice hockey player and manager
- 1958 – Veronica Guerin, Irish journalist (died 1996)
- 1958 – Bill Watterson, American author and illustrator
- 1959 – Marc Cohn, American singer-songwriter and keyboard player
- 1962 – Sarina Hülsenbeck, German swimmer
- 1963 – Edie Falco, American actress
- 1964 – Ronald D. Moore, American screenwriter and producer
- 1964 – Jillian Armenante, American actress
- 1965 – Kathryn Erbe, American actress
- 1966 – Susannah Doyle, English actress, director, and playwright
- 1966 – Gianfranco Zola, Italian footballer and coach
- 1967 – Mustafa Al-Kadhimi, Iraqi politician, 80th Prime Minister of Iraq
- 1968 – Ken Akamatsu, Japanese illustrator
- 1968 – Kenji Ito, Japanese pianist and composer
- 1968 – Nardwuar, Canadian celebrity journalist and musician
- 1968 – Hedi Slimane, French fashion designer and photographer
- 1968 – Alex Zülle, Swiss cyclist
- 1968 – Susan Wojcicki, Polish-American technology executive (died 2024)
- 1968 – Michael Stuhlbarg, American actor
- 1968 – Iwan Setiawan, Indonesian football manager (died 2026)
- 1969 – Jenji Kohan, American screenwriter and producer
- 1969 – John LeClair, American ice hockey player
- 1969 – RZA, American rapper, producer, actor, and director
- 1970 – Mac Dre, American rapper and producer, founded Thizz Entertainment (died 2004)
- 1970 – Valentí Massana, Spanish race walker
- 1971 – Derek McInnes, Scottish footballer and manager
- 1972 – Matthew Birir, Kenyan runner
- 1972 – Robert Esmie, Canadian sprinter
- 1973 – Marcus Allbäck, Swedish footballer and coach
- 1973 – Róisín Murphy, Irish singer-songwriter and producer
- 1974 – Márcio Amoroso, Brazilian footballer
- 1974 – Sarah Taylor, Jersey squash player
- 1975 – Hernán Crespo, Argentinian footballer and coach
- 1975 – Ai Sugiyama, Japanese tennis player
- 1975 – Chris Gratton, Canadian ice hockey player
- 1976 – Bizarre, American rapper
- 1976 – Nuno Gomes, Portuguese footballer
- 1977 – Nicolas Kiefer, German tennis player
- 1978 – Britta Oppelt, German rower
- 1978 – Allan Simonsen, Danish racing driver (died 2013)
- 1979 – Shane Filan, Irish singer-songwriter
- 1979 – Amélie Mauresmo, French-Swiss tennis player
- 1979 – Stiliyan Petrov, Bulgarian footballer and manager
- 1980 – Pauly D, American television personality
- 1980 – David Rozehnal, Czech footballer
- 1982 – Fabrício de Souza, Brazilian footballer
- 1982 – Alexander Dimitrenko, Ukrainian-German boxer
- 1982 – Alberto Gilardino, Italian footballer
- 1982 – Philippe Gilbert, Belgian cyclist
- 1982 – Kate Gynther, Australian water polo player
- 1982 – Dave Haywood, American singer-songwriter and guitarist
- 1982 – Paíto, Mozambican footballer
- 1982 – Szabolcs Perenyi, Romanian-Hungarian footballer
- 1982 – Beno Udrih, Slovenian basketball player
- 1982 – Tuba Büyüküstün, Turkish actress
- 1982 – Junri Namigata, Japanese tennis player
- 1983 – Marco Estrada, Mexican baseball player
- 1983 – Jonás Gutiérrez, Argentinian footballer
- 1983 – Zheng Jie, Chinese tennis player
- 1984 – Danay Garcia, Cuban actress
- 1985 – Alexandre R. Picard, Canadian ice hockey player
- 1985 – Megan Rapinoe, American soccer player
- 1985 – François Arnaud, Canadian actor
- 1986 – Iurii Cheban, Ukrainian canoe sprinter
- 1986 – Piermario Morosini, Italian footballer (died 2012)
- 1986 – Alexander Radulov, Russian ice hockey player
- 1987 – Ji Chang-wook, South Korean actor
- 1987 – Safiq Rahim, Malaysian footballer
- 1987 – Alexander Kristoff, Norwegian cyclist
- 1987 – Cam Talbot, Canadian ice hockey player
- 1988 – Samir Ujkani, Albanian footballer
- 1988 – Ish Smith, American basketball player
- 1989 – Adam Cole, American wrestler
- 1989 – Georgios Efrem, Cypriot footballer
- 1990 – Abeba Aregawi, Ethiopian-Swedish runner
- 1991 – Jason Dolley, American actor, musician and Twitch streamer
- 1992 – Alberto Moreno, Spanish footballer
- 1992 – Chiara Scholl, American tennis player
- 1993 – Yaroslav Kosov, Russian ice hockey player
- 1993 – Jorge Polanco, Dominican baseball player
- 1994 – Jeon Jong-seo, South Korean actress
- 1994 – Shohei Ohtani, Japanese baseball player
- 1995 – Danton Heinen, Canadian ice hockey player
- 1996 – Aamir Jamal, Pakistani cricketer
- 1996 – Brianna Turner, American basketball player
- 1998 – Emily Fox, American soccer player
- 1999 – Suzan Lamens, Dutch tennis player
- 1999 – Kang Hye-won, South Korean actress and singer
- 2000 – Faouzia, Moroccan-Canadian singer and songwriter
- 2003 – Junior Caminero, Dominican baseball player
- 2005 – Sombr, American singer and songwriter

== Deaths ==
=== Pre-1600 ===
- 905 – Cui Yuan, Chinese chancellor
- 905 – Dugu Sun, Chinese chancellor
- 905 – Lu Yi, Chinese chancellor (born 847)
- 905 – Pei Shu, Chinese chancellor (born 841)
- 905 – Wang Pu, Chinese chancellor
- 936 – Xu Ji, Chinese official and chancellor
- 967 – Murakami, Japanese emperor (born 926)
- 1080 – Ísleifur Gissurarson, Icelandic bishop (born 1006)
- 1091 – William of Hirsau, German abbot
- 1316 – Ferdinand, prince of Majorca (born 1278)
- 1375 – Charles III, French nobleman (born 1337)
- 1413 – Musa Çelebi, Ottoman prince and co-ruler
- 1507 – Crinitus, Italian scholar and academic (born 1475)
- 1539 – Anthony Maria Zaccaria, Italian saint (born 1502)

=== 1601–1900 ===
- 1661 – Sir Hugh Speke, 1st Baronet
- 1666 – Albert VI, German nobleman (born 1584)
- 1676 – Carl Gustaf Wrangel, Swedish field marshal and politician (born 1613)
- 1715 – Charles Ancillon, French jurist and diplomat (born 1659)
- 1719 – Meinhardt Schomberg, 3rd Duke of Schomberg, German-English general (born 1641)
- 1773 – Francisco José Freire, Portuguese historian and philologist (born 1719)
- 1819 – William Cornwallis, English admiral and politician (born 1744)
- 1826 – Stamford Raffles, English politician, founded Singapore (born 1782)
- 1833 – Nicéphore Niépce, French inventor, created the first known photograph (born 1765)
- 1859 – Charles Cagniard de la Tour, French physicist and engineer (born 1777)
- 1862 – Heinrich Georg Bronn, German geologist and paleontologist (born 1800)
- 1863 – Lewis Armistead, Confederate general (born 1817)
- 1884 – Victor Massé, French composer (born 1822)

=== 1901–present ===
- 1908 – Jonas Lie, Norwegian author, poet, and playwright (born 1833)
- 1920 – Max Klinger, German painter and sculptor (born 1857)
- 1927 – Albrecht Kossel, German physician and academic, Nobel Prize laureate (born 1853)
- 1929 – Henry Johnson, American sergeant (born 1897)
- 1932 – Sasha Chorny, Russian poet and author (born 1880)
- 1935 – Bernard de Pourtalès, Swiss captain and sailor (born 1870)
- 1937 – Daniel Sawyer, American golfer (born 1884)
- 1943 – Kazimierz Junosza-Stępowski, Polish actor (born 1880)
- 1943 – Karin Swanström, Swedish actress, director, and producer (born 1873)
- 1945 – John Curtin, Australian journalist and politician, 14th Prime Minister of Australia (born 1885)
- 1948 – Georges Bernanos, French soldier and author (born 1888)
- 1948 – Carole Landis, American actress (born 1919)
- 1948 – Piet Aalberse, Dutch politician (born 1871)
- 1950 – Thomas William Burgess, English swimmer and water polo player (born 1872)
- 1957 – Anugrah Narayan Sinha, Indian lawyer and politician, 1st Deputy Chief Minister of Bihar (born 1887)
- 1965 – Porfirio Rubirosa, Dominican racing driver, polo player, and diplomat (born 1909)
- 1966 – George de Hevesy, Hungarian-German chemist and academic, Nobel Prize laureate (born 1885)
- 1969 – Wilhelm Backhaus, German pianist and educator (born 1884)
- 1969 – Walter Gropius, German architect, designed the John F. Kennedy Federal Building and Werkbund Exhibition (born 1883)
- 1969 – Tom Mboya, Kenyan politician, 1st Kenyan Minister of Justice (born 1930)
- 1969 – Leo McCarey, American director, producer, and screenwriter (born 1898)
- 1975 – Gilda dalla Rizza, Italian soprano and actress (born 1892)
- 1976 – Walter Giesler, American soccer player and referee (born 1910)
- 1983 – Harry James, American trumpet player and actor (born 1916)
- 1984 – Chic Murray, Canadian politician, 2nd Mayor of Mississauga (born 1914)
- 1991 – Howard Nemerov, American poet and essayist (born 1920)
- 1995 – Jüri Järvet, Estonian actor and screenwriter (born 1919)
- 1997 – A. Thangathurai, Sri Lankan Tamil lawyer and politician (born 1936)
- 1998 – Sid Luckman, American football player (born 1916)
- 2002 – Katy Jurado, Mexican actress (born 1924)
- 2002 – Ted Williams, American baseball player and manager (born 1918)
- 2004 – Hugh Shearer, Jamaican journalist and politician, 3rd Prime Minister of Jamaica (born 1923)
- 2005 – James Stockdale, American admiral (born 1923)
- 2006 – Gert Fredriksson, Swedish canoe racer (born 1919)
- 2006 – Thirunalloor Karunakaran, Indian poet and scholar (born 1924)
- 2006 – Kenneth Lay, American businessman (born 1942)
- 2007 – Régine Crespin, French soprano (born 1927)
- 2007 – George Melly, English singer-songwriter and critic (born 1926)
- 2008 – Hasan Doğan, Turkish businessman (born 1956)
- 2010 – Bob Probert, Canadian ice hockey player and radio host (born 1965)
- 2011 – Cy Twombly, American-Italian painter, sculptor, and photographer (born 1928)
- 2012 – Rob Goris, Belgian cyclist (born 1982)
- 2012 – Gerrit Komrij, Dutch author, poet, and playwright (born 1944)
- 2012 – Ruud van Hemert, Dutch actor, director, producer, and screenwriter (born 1938)
- 2013 – David Cargo, American politician, 22nd Governor of New Mexico (born 1929)
- 2013 – William Tebeau, American engineer, first African-American man to graduate from Oregon State University (born 1925)
- 2013 – Lambert Jackson Woodburne, South African admiral (born 1939)
- 2014 – Rosemary Murphy, American actress (born 1925)
- 2014 – Volodymyr Sabodan, Ukrainian metropolitan (born 1935)
- 2014 – Hans-Ulrich Wehler, German historian and academic (born 1931)
- 2015 – Uffe Haagerup, Danish mathematician and academic (born 1949)
- 2015 – Yoichiro Nambu, Japanese-American physicist and academic, Nobel Prize laureate (born 1921)
- 2020 – Nick Cordero, Canadian actor and singer (born 1978)
- 2021 – Raffaella Carrà, Italian singer, dancer, television presenter and actress (born 1943)
- 2021 – Richard Donner, American film director (born 1930)
- 2024 – Jon Landau, American film producer (born 1960)
- 2024 – Bengt I. Samuelsson, Swedish biochemist and academic, Nobel Prize laureate (born 1934)
- 2024 – Vic Seixas, American tennis player (born 1923)

== Holidays and observances ==
- Bloody Thursday (International Longshore and Warehouse Union)
- Christian feast day:
  - Anthony Maria Zaccaria, priest (died 1539)
  - Cyril and Methodius (a public holiday in Czech Republic and Slovakia)
  - Martha, mother of Simeon Stylites the Younger
  - Wexford Martyrs (Roman Catholic Church)
  - Zoe of Rome (Roman Catholic Church)
  - July 5 (Eastern Orthodox liturgics)
- Fifth of July (New York), historic celebration of the abolition of slavery in New York in 1827.
- Independence Day (Algeria), celebrating the independence of Algeria from France in 1962.
- Independence Day (Cape Verde), celebrating the independence of Cape Verde from Portugal in 1975.
- Independence Day (Venezuela), celebrating the independence of Venezuela from Spain in 1811; also National Armed Forces Day.
- Tynwald Day, if July 5 is on a weekend, the holiday is the following Monday. (Isle of Man)
