= VA251 =

VA251 may refer to:

- Ariane flight VA251, an Ariane 5 launch that occurred on 16 January 2020
- Virgin Australia flight 251, with IATA flight number VA251
- Virginia State Route 251 (SR 251 or VA-251), a primary state highway in the United States
