= VA254 =

VA254 may refer to:

- Ariane flight VA254, an Ariane 5 launch that occurred on 30 July 2021
- Virgin Australia flight 254, with IATA flight number VA254
- Virginia State Route 254 (SR 254 or VA-254), a primary state highway in the United States
