= VA253 =

VA253 may refer to:

- Ariane flight VA253, an Ariane 5 launch that occurred on 15 August 2020
- Virgin Australia flight 253, with IATA flight number VA253
- Virginia State Route 253 (SR 253 or VA-253), a primary state highway in the United States
