= VA252 =

VA252 may refer to:

- Ariane flight VA252, an Ariane 5 launch that occurred on 18 February 2020
- Virgin Australia flight 252, with IATA flight number VA252
- Virginia State Route 252 (SR 252 or VA-252), a primary state highway in the United States
