= City pair =

In commercial aviation, a city pair is defined as a pair of departure (origin) and arrival (destination) airport codes on a flight itinerary. A given city pair may be a single non-stop flight segment, a direct flight with one or more stops, or an itinerary with connecting flights (multiple segments). The city pair, IAD-LHR would consist of flights and/or multi-leg itineraries that originate at Washington-Dulles Airport and terminate at London Heathrow Airport. The city pair, NYC-TYO would consist of flights and/or multi-leg itineraries that originate at any New York airport (John F Kennedy, Liberty or LaGuardia) and terminate at either Narita or Haneda in Tokyo.
