= Chinese Turks =

Chinese Turks may refer to:

- Turks in the Tang military
- Chinese Tatars
- Chinese people in Turkey
- Few of several states ruled by ethnically Turkic families during the Five Dynasties and Ten Kingdoms period of China
  - Later Tang
  - Later Jin
  - Later Han
- Salars, Uyghurs, Western Yugurs, Kazakh, Kyrgyz and other ethnic groups in China that speak Turkic languages
