= Chinese people in Turkey =

- (China) (Taiwan) (Turkey)

Regions with significant populations
- Istanbul

Languages
- Chinese · Turkish · Uyghur

Religion
- Irreligion, Buddhism, Chinese Folk Religion, Islam (Uyghur)

Related ethnic groups
- Overseas Chinese

Chinese people in Turkey are one the ethnic groups of overseas Chinese living in Central Asia. They consist mainly of Chinese-born expatriates living in Turkey and descendants of Chinese migrants. In 2020, there were 18,740 documented Chinese people living in Turkey. A few hundred Chinese students are enrolled in various Turkish universities.

Turkey also hosts approximately 50,000 Uyghur refugees which hail from the Xinjiang region in northwestern China. They have come in large numbers since the early 1950s from the northwestern provinces of China and as part of their migration to the Middle East, many of whom chose to settle down in urban centres of Turkey. Today, they have effectively associated themselves with the local economy and can be seen practicing in various forms of trade.

With flowing tourism and investment, Chinese interest in cities such as Istanbul has grown. Dolapdere, a neighbourhood in Istanbul, is now undergoing transformation to become the new Chinatown in the city. Several people of Chinese origin have moved to Turkey in order to further their table tennis careers and compete internationally for Turkey, including Melek Hu, Cem Zeng, and Bora Vang.

== History ==
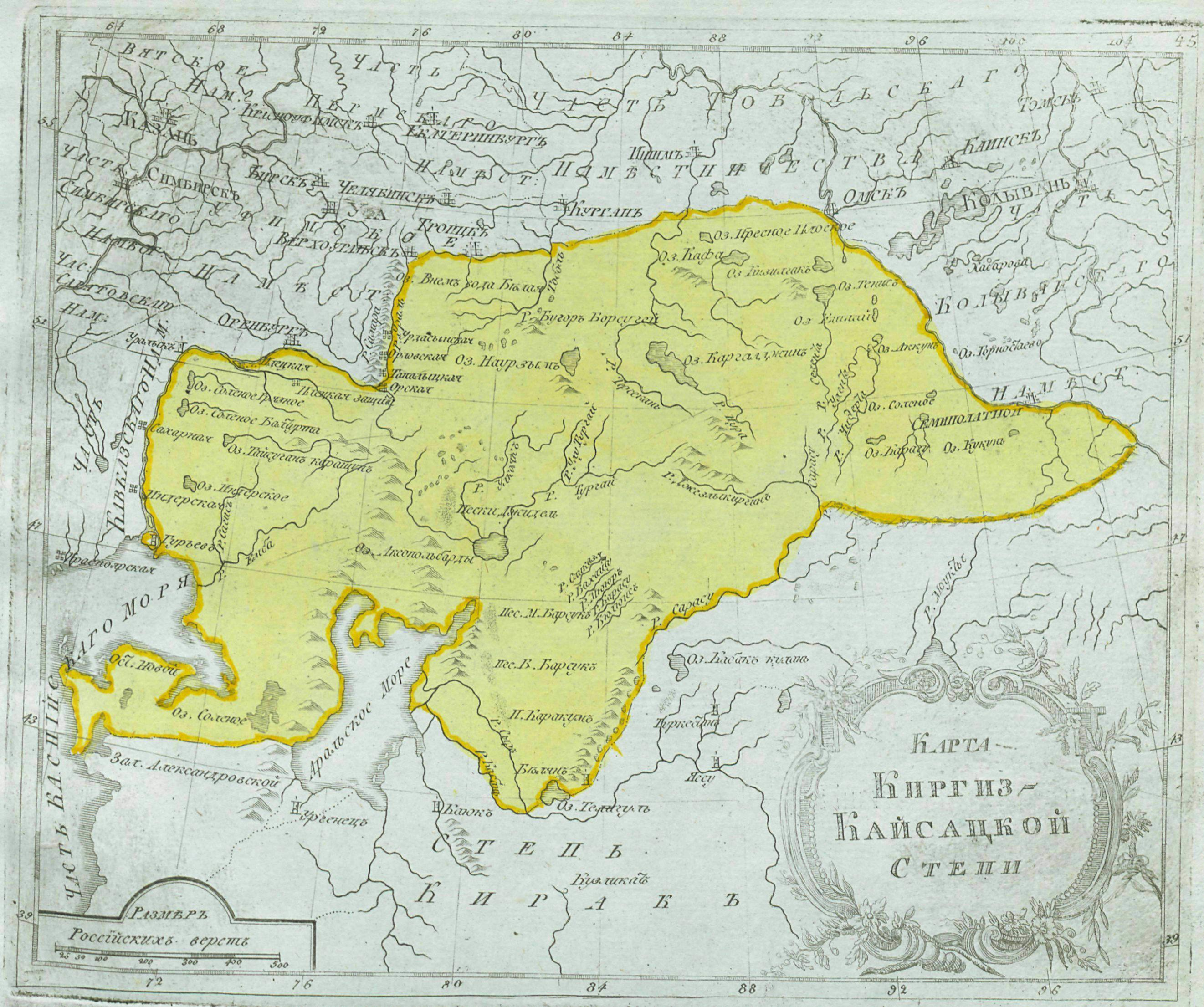
Map of the Kazakh Steppe 1792

After many centuries of migration from the Chinese state, there has been an emergence of distinct Chinese ethnic diasporas in the Turkish State. Chinese Empires went through phases of trying to synthesise cultures with steppe ethnicities, including Turkic peoples, as they conquered them.

This is referred to as the Eurasian Hybrid model. During the Tang Dynasty, the Northern China-Inner Asia borderlands were often contested, with ethnically distinct and autonomous regions. An Lushan, a former provincial governor and half-Turkic military commander for the Tangs, revolted and caused the Tang Dynasty to rely on Uyghur Empire military reinforcements, another Turkic group. The Silk Road was an ancient, international trade route which connected the Ottoman and the Chinese empires for 2000 years. The road spanned from the ancient Chinese capital of Chang'an, through Inner Asia, to the modern day Turkey. Today, the People's Republic of China (PRC) and the Republic of Turkey stand on the Eastern and Western ends of Eurasia and the Silk Road.

Sino-Turkic economic policies were strengthened in the 20th century. The 1970s saw developments in Turkish foreign policy and Turkey's relationship with China. The international Cold War trade divisions of the Eastern and Western Blocs were loosening as the Sino- American relationship was strengthening. The US Congress put an embargo on trade with Turkey in 1975 in response to the Cyprus Dispute, because of their opposition to the Turkish operation of sending troops to Cyprus on July 20, 1974. Ankara now needed to seek relations with socialist nations that were not found in the Arab World, so began to prioritise developing the policy with Asia for their own national interest. Turkey then turned to the People's Republic of China (PRC) for support since it was a member of the UN Security Council, which gave it increasing leverage in world politics. Ankara was able to enter the rampantly growing Chinese market, and purchase weapons and missile systems that they no longer could acquire from the West. From the 1970s, Ankara began to standardise the development of Asian Foreign Policy.

== Demographics ==
Turkstat reports that in 2022, the overall population of Chinese people living in Turkey was 16,880 people. 9,538 of this population were male and 7,342 were female. Chinese people also make up a considerable portion of naturalised ethnic groups, being the 12th largest group of citizens in the country.

Overall Chinese Population Living in Turkey
	Male	Female	Overall Chinese Population
2019	10,085	8,420	18,505
2020	10,420	8,317	18,740
2021	11,965	8,521	20,486
2022	9,538	7,342	16,880

=== Migration patterns ===
The Turkish census (TurkStat) shows the number of immigrants and emigrants by country of citizenship. In 2019, there were 7,328 Chinese immigrants and 3,252 Chinese emigrants. The immigrant population comprised 4,169 males and 3,159 females, while in the emigrant population, 2,501 were male and 751 were female. There was an overall net migration of 4,076 people. These figures have decreased since 2016, where there were 8,281 Chinese immigrants living in Turkey and 3,057 Chinese emigrants. Chinese people make up the 19th largest foreign national migration group in Turkey.

Number of Immigrants and Emigrants by Country of Citizenship in 2019
	Male	Female	Overall Population Net Migration
Immigrant Population	4169	3159	7328
Emigrant Population	2501	751	3252

== Ethnic minorities ==
=== Uyghurs ===
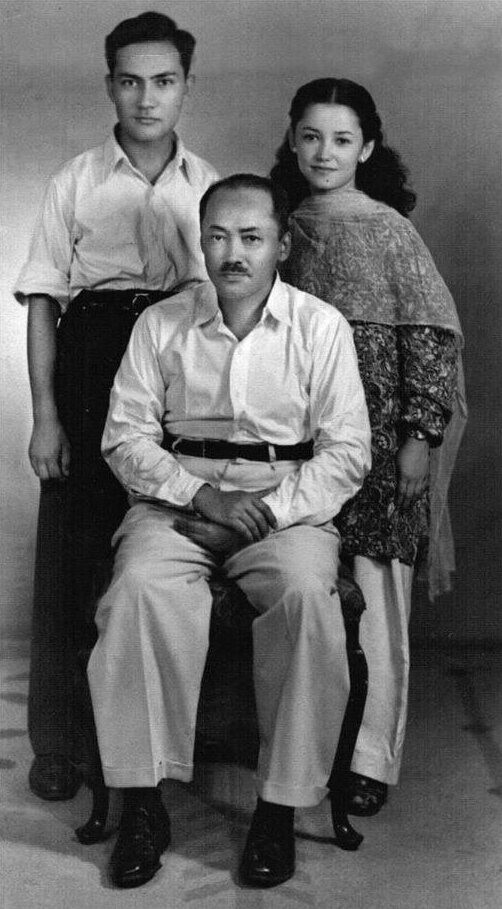
Mehmet Emin Buğra, Turkic Muslim Leader who led the first-wave of Uyghur migration to Turkey, photographed with family in 1952

Since the 1950s, there has been a growing diaspora community of ethnic Uyghurs in Turkey. Some founding members of this community, Mehmet Emin Buğra and İsa Yusuf Alptekin, provided social cohesion to unify disparate individuals who have fled their homeland in Communist China. The earliest migration waves of the Uyghurs to Turkey are traced back to 1952, when the Chinese Communist Party seized control of the Xinjiang region in northwest China in 1949. These first migration waves were also led by Buğra and Alptekin, and these prominent members continued the legacy of Uyghur migration well after new waves had arrived in Turkey. Turkey hosts approximately 50,000 Uyghurs. The majority of this population is dispersed in Istanbul's Sefakoy and Zeytinburnu districts, located in the southeast of the city.

The community has been supported by Uyghur political and cultural organisations that have been mobilized by first-generation Uyghurs of the initial waves of emigrants. The Eastern Turkistan Foundation (Dogu Turkistan Vakfi), founded by Mehmet Riza Bekin in 1978, and East Turkistan Human Rights Watch Association, are both non-profit organisations located in Istanbul. Largely, the organisations campaign and raise awareness, criticising alleged human rights abuses by the Chinese Government directed at the Uyghurs, who are extradited from Turkey. The Uyghur community does not feel pressured to assimilate into a Turkish identity, distinguishing themselves in their distinct diaspora. They instead have a strong affiliation with Uyghurness and central to this is their embrace of Islam.

In the past, the living conditions of the Turkic Uyghurs in China has often been a source of contention between the two countries, with Turkey protesting the treatment of Uyghurs in China. Many Uyghur activists in Turkey are members of secessionist groups such as Home of the Youth, which advocate the independence of a Turkestan republic carved from the current Uyghur homeland of Xinjiang, PRC. These groups have reportedly engaged in various attacks against Chinese nationals and interests based in Turkey. In 2005, China voiced concerns over such organisations, stating explicitly that Turkey should contain any separatist activities which posed a threat to China and that Turkish security agencies had to better protect the life and property of Chinese citizens in Turkey. In 2009, the Chinese Foreign Ministry warned its citizens in Turkey "to remain vigilant and ... avoid crowded or sensitive places" after a series of threats were made on Chinese people and facilities.

== Chinese investment in Turkey ==
China's Belt Road Initiative (BRI) has renewed Chinese investors' interest in buying real estate in Turkey. 415 units were purchased by Chinese Nationals from January to July 2020. The Chinese are now the 8th largest foreign property buyer in Turkey. Foreign investments have increased alongside the Turkish Citizenship by Investment Program. This program allows foreign nationals to invest in different country sectors in order to obtain the rights of Turkish Citizenship. It was introduced on 12 January 2017. Foreigners can buy property valued at 1 million dollars USD or more and then are entitled to Turkish Citizenship themselves and their family.

=== Chinatown in Istanbul ===
Chinese investment has been focused on the Istanbul quarter of Dolapdere, located in the Beyoğlu district in central Istanbul. İstiklal Avenue, which stretches from Okmeydanı to Dolapdere, is the best-known spot where the diaspora has congregated to create a Chinatown in the city. The head of the Turkey-China Business Council for the Foreign Economic Relations Board (DEİK), Murat Kolbaşı, has said, "There are 'Chinatowns,' where people of Chinese origin live, in a number of cities across the world. As Chinese interest in Istanbul grows stronger, we may see something similar emerging here." Chinese tourists in Istanbul numbered 500,000 in 2018 which was an increase of 100% from the previous year. Dolpadere, which historically has been a poor neighbourhood, has undergone gentrification to become Istanbul's Chinatown, seeking interest by Chinese foreign investors who have capitalised on the Turkish Foreign Citizenship by Investment Program. Chinese investors have launched The Regard and the Beijing hotels located in Dolpadere. Chinese companies are undertaking these investments to support to large numbers of Chinese tourists who visit Istanbul annually. Other Chinese-lead venture are under development, including the building of restaurants, property developments, and shops.

=== Chinese investment in Turkish solar energy ===
Talesun, the Chinese solar energy company, has begun to invest in Turkey's solar energy potential. Large areas of Turkey's land mass are exposed to direct sunlight, allowing for solar irradiation levels of up to 1,500 KWh per square meter. Talesun produces Photovoltaic modules and panels and have instigated a partnership with Turkish import export company Ege Trade to start a joint venture, the Talesun Anadolu Solar Enerji Project. With the introduction of Turkish solar energy potential, this JV has built a capacity of 50 megawatts (MW), and will lead to the local manufacturing of solar panels within Turkish borders. Chinese solar energy companies Yingli Solar and NARI have invested in Turkish solar energy plants and entered the Turkish market. China Sunergy invested US$600 million into a production plant in Istanbul and has shipped solar modules and panels to European customers.

== See also ==
- China–Turkey relations
- Taiwan–Turkey relations
- Turks in China
