= Taiwan–Turkey relations =

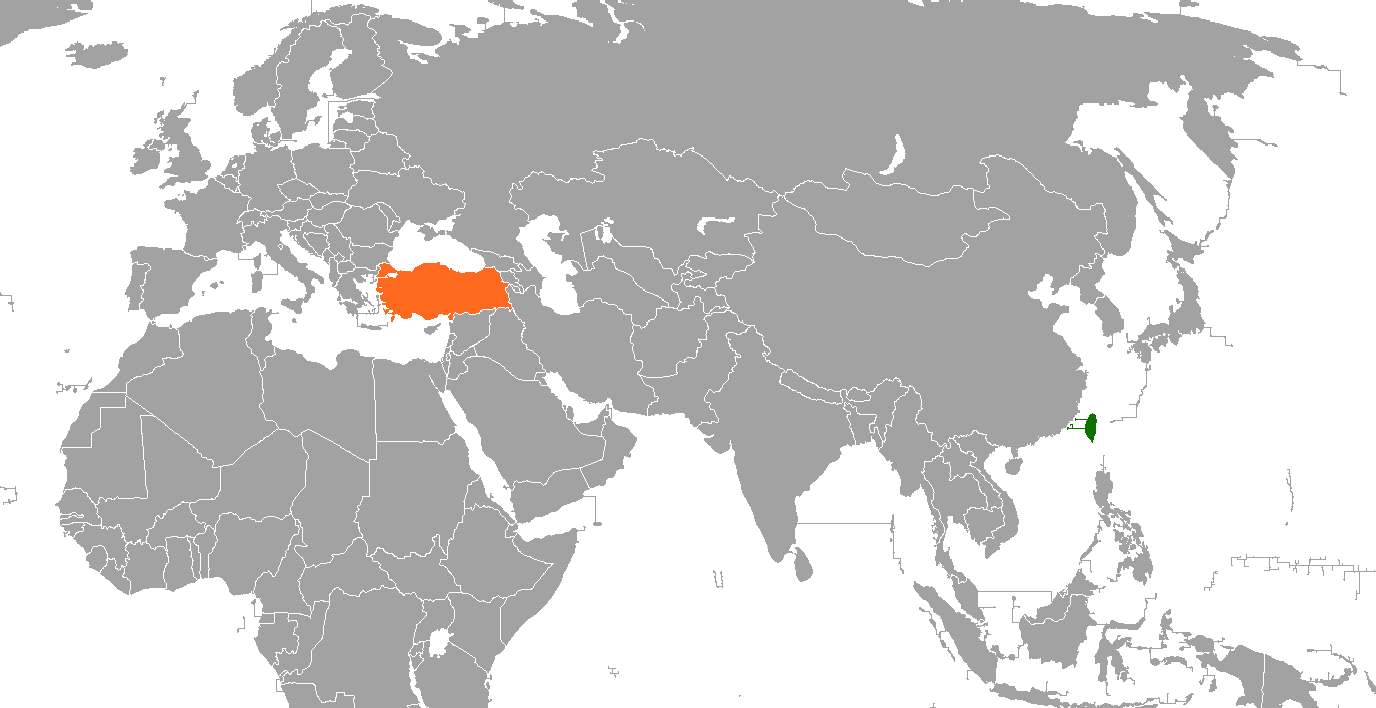
- Taiwan: Turkey

Diplomatic mission
- Taipei Economic and Cultural Mission in Ankara: Turkish Trade Office in Taipei

Taiwan–Turkey relations are the foreign relations between Taiwan and Turkey. Since 1971, Turkey maintains non-governmental, working-level relations with Taiwan.

== Diplomatic relations ==
=== Ottoman relations with Qing and Japanese ruled Taiwan ===
Ottoman–Qing relations
- Ottoman Empire: China

From 1683 to 1895, Great Qing governed Taiwan as part of Fujian, but generally sent Great Qing's worst governor to Taiwan which led to oppressive rule and violence. The Qing dynasty ceded Taiwan Island, the Penghu Islands and the Liaodong Peninsula to the Empire of Japan in the 1895 Treaty of Shimonoseki, which the Ottoman Empire recognized.

=== Republic of China ===
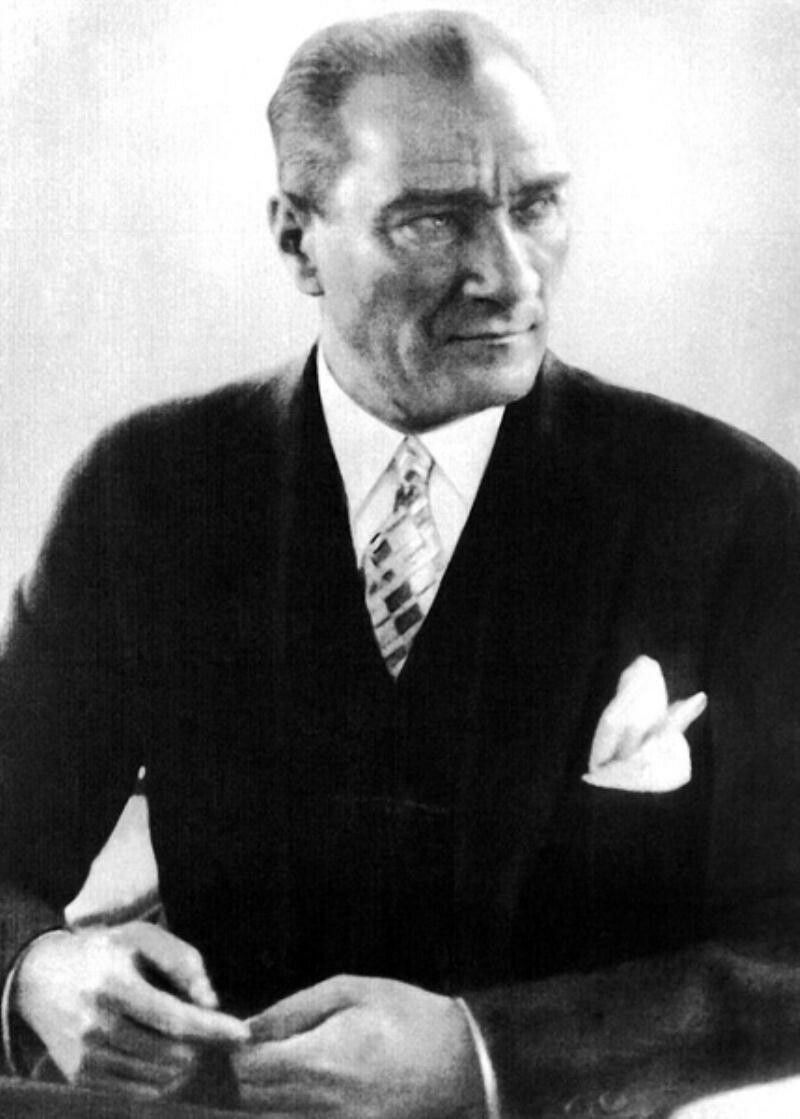
Mustafa Kemal Atatürk, the first President of the Republic of Turkey.

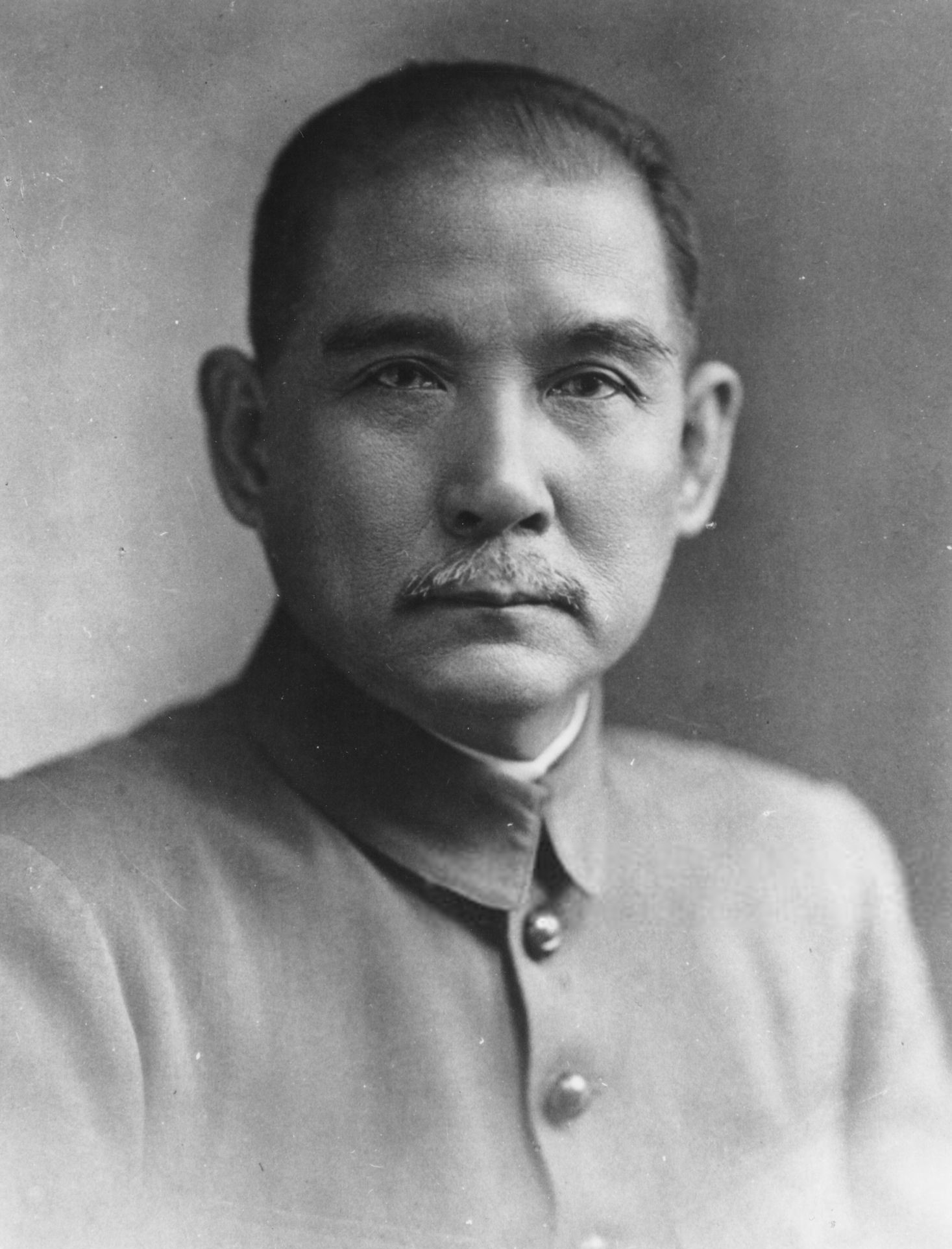
Sun Yat-sen, the first president of the Provisional Government of the Republic of China.

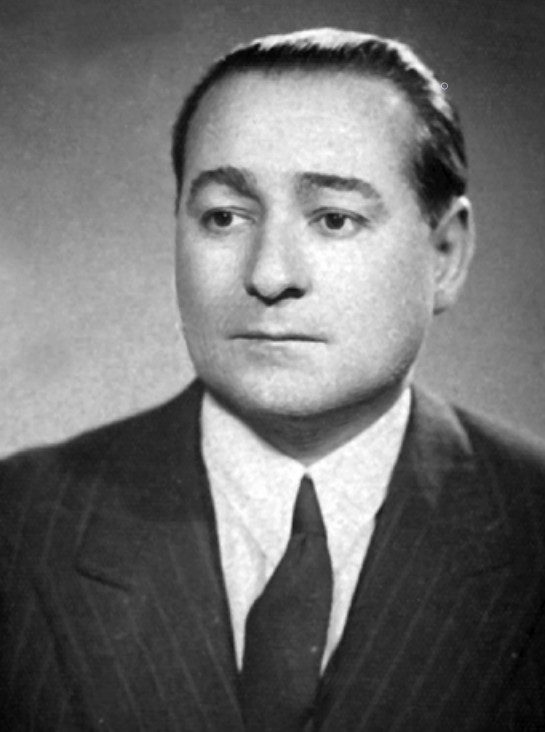
Adnan Menderes, the first democratically-elected Prime Minister of the Republic of Turkey.

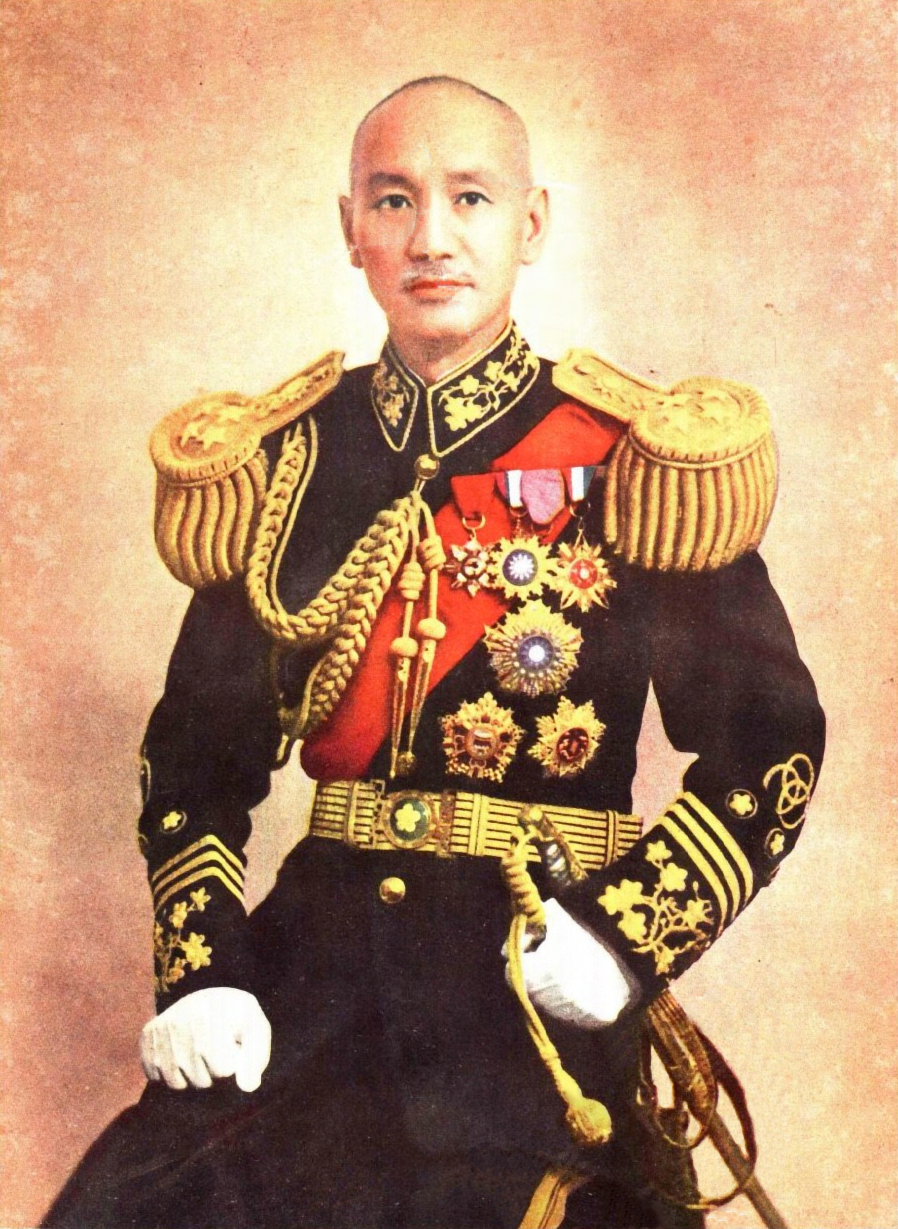
Chiang Kai-shek, the first President of the Republic of China based in Taiwan.

==== 20th century ====
After the collapse of the Qing dynasty in 1911, the Ottoman Empire and later the Republic of Turkey, founded by Mustafa Kemal Atatürk, established relations with the Republic of China, founded by Sun Yet-sen. Turkish government officials received a Chinese Muslim delegation led by KMT official Wang Zengshan who denounced the Japanese invasion of China.

In 1945, following Japan's defeat in World War II on 14 August, the islands and archipelagos of Taiwan, Penghu, Kinmen and Matsu became part of the Republic of China on 25 October. Between 1947 and 1949, armies led by Mao Zedong and the Chinese Communist Party defeated the forces of Chiang Kai-shek and the KMT on the mainland, which resulted in the ROC government and military retreating to Taiwan. The ROC went on to reconstruct the island, following the land reform effort launched in 1950.

In 1958, prime minister Adnan Menderes visited president Chiang in Taipei when he embarked on a tour of Japan (22–25 April), South Korea (25–28 April), Taiwan (28 April–1 May) and India (May 1–?). On 31 March 1959, defense minister Etem Menderes and rear admiral Adnan Kaynar arrived on a three-day visit to Taipei following an invitation from defense minister Yu Ta-wei and armed forces chief Wang Shu-ming. Half-way into Adnan Menderes' third successive term, his government was deposed in a military coup on 27 May 1960, resulting in seven Democrat Party (DP) members killed including the deposed premier who was executed on 17 September 1961. The DP was banned in September 1960, less than 15 years after it formed in January 1946, and was succeeded by the Justice Party (AP) in February 1961.

A period of Sino-American rapprochement occurred between 1968 and 1972 under president Richard Nixon. On 5 August 1971, Turkey recognized the People's Republic of China in Beijing thereby ending recognition of the Republic of China in Taipei. On 25 October, Turkey was one of 76 member states that voted in favor of admitting Mao's PRC to the United Nations in place of Chiang's ROC. Despite adhering to the One-China policy, Turkey still maintains unofficial relations with Taiwan.

In 1975, Chiang Kai-shek died on 5 April and was succeeded by his vice president Yen Chia-kan. On 28 October, president Yen received a visit by Turkish MPs Ahmed İhsan Kırımlı and Mustafa Gülcügil. Fethi Tevetoglu, former chairman of the Turkish Senate's Foreign Affairs Committee, informed Taipei that "several important government and civic leaders have been endeavoring to restore diplomatic relations with the Republic of China. [Prime minister] Demirel is an old friend of mine and he personally favors restoring ties." Less than a year into Demirel's third non-successive term, his government was deposed in a military coup on 12 September 1980.

==== 21st century ====
Turkey's economic recovery and eventual rapid growth under the last year of prime minister Bülent Ecevit and under prime minister Recep Tayyip Erdoğan during the course of the 2000s and early 2010s, which saw massive economic and political reforms, led to Taiwan's increasing insistence on easing travel restrictions and expand investment and trade volume. Turkey took a slow approach to expanding relations in the face of pressure from China and fears of backlash. Growing trade in the form of Turkish industry importing Taiwanese goods, and the insistence of Taiwanese representatives under the presidency of Ma Ying-jeou that China would not object to trade relations and that China has been the largest recipient of Taiwanese investments to date, led to increasing cooperation.

As part of bolstering relations, Taiwan's representative office in Turkey declared 2011 the "Year of Knowing Taiwan Better", while the Ministry of Economic Affairs singled out Turkey and Russia to its inaugural "Central and Eastern European Key Market Development Group". On 12 December 2011, MP Şafak Pavey stated that Taiwan should be taken as a model for Northern Cyprus. As the CHP's head of Environmental and Social Policy and a member of the UN Committee on the Rights of Persons with Disabilities, she led a delegation to Taiwan after accepting an invitation to visit from 14 to 19 October 2012.

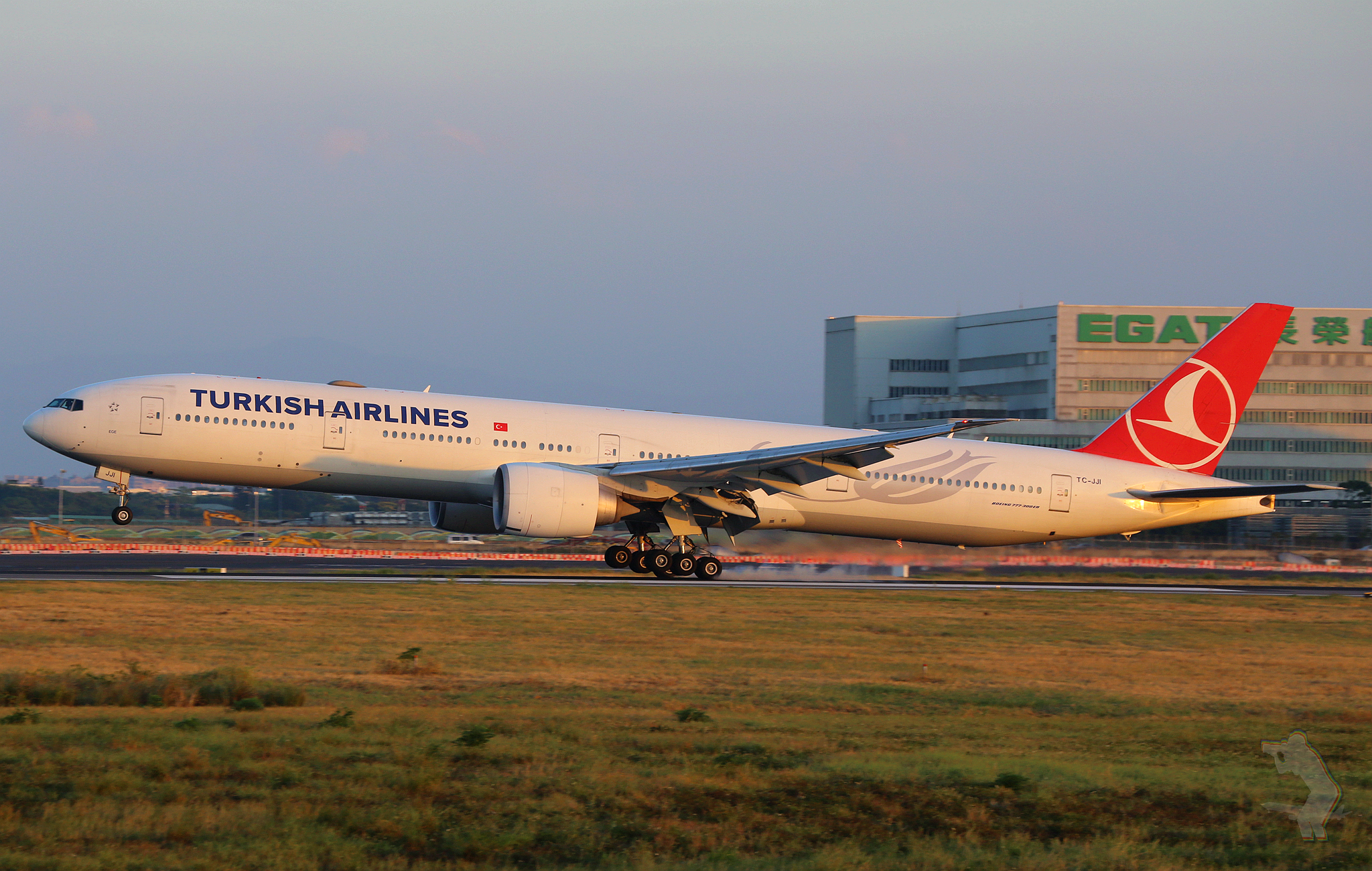
Turkish Airlines aircraft in Taiwan

On 2 May 2013, Taiwan and Turkey announced a landmark agreement to reduce travel restrictions. From 15 May, Taiwanese passport holders qualified for single-entry 30-day e-visas to enter Turkey through select international airports while Turkish passport holders qualified for single-entry 30-day travel visas upon arrival at Taoyuan International or alternatively apply for a 'temporary entry permit' and visa upon arrival at Taiwan's three other international airports. On 20 September 2014, Turkey expanded the privilege to all valid points of entry by land, sea and air. On 10 October, Turkish Airlines announced it will launch passenger flights to Taipei.

On 31 March 2015, the inaugural direct flight via Turkish Airlines departed Istanbul at 1:20 AM and landed in Taipei roughly 11 hours later. Preexisting connecting flights took 14–16 hours. On 3 June, Eva Air and Turkish Airlines began a codesharing agreement. On 12 January 2016, Taiwan launched its e-visa program and Turkish passport holders were among those qualified. On 10 February, Taiwan and Turkey initiated a free e-visa agreement eliminating their respective US$47 and US$24 fees. On 26 October 2019, Taiwanese became eligible for e-visas granting them multiple entries into Turkey over a span of six months, with each stay valid for up to 30 days for ordinary passport holders and 90 days for official passport holders.

Yaser Cheng (Cheng Tai-hsiang), Taiwan's representative to Turkey from 2014 to 2021, and Muzaffer Eroktem, Turkey's representative to Taiwan from 2008 to 2010 and who had previously been posted there from 1970 to 1971, played prominent roles in bringing the two countries closer. Eroktem was presented the Friendship Medal of Diplomacy by foreign affairs minister Timothy Yang (Yang Chin-tien) on 3 November 2010.

On 31 October 2020, president Erdoğan posted a tweet thanking Taiwan for giving Turkey aid to get through an earthquake it recently got struck by, but took it down and replaced it with one where the thanks was gone. Many Taiwanese officials expressed their displeasure. Joseph Wu, Taiwan's Minister of Foreign Affairs, said it was due to China's meddling and pressure.

== Economic relations ==
Taiwan began offering scholarships to Turkish students in 2005, and Turkey began offering scholarships to Taiwanese students in 2012. Trade volume between the two countries was US$1.4 billion in 2017 (Turkish exports/imports: 0.2/1.2 billion USD). The Turkiye–Taiwan Business Council was founded by the Union of Chambers and Exchanges of Turkiye (TOBB) and the Chinese Association of Industry and Commerce (CNAIC) on 14 December 1993, originally as the Turk–Taiwan Business Council before adopting its current name in 2014.

According to figures shared by Taiwan, the number of Taiwanese visitors to Turkey each year was:

Year	No. of Taiwanese visitors to Turkey	Ref.
2008	10,000	
2009		
2010		
2011		
2012	over 20,000	
2013	29,960	
2014		
2015	47,083	
2016	over 60,000	
2017		

Year	No. of Taiwanese visitors to Turkey	Ref.
2018	over 80,000	
2019	87,168	
2020		
2021	7,386	
2022	29,586	
2023	78,286	

== See also ==
- Foreign relations of Taiwan
- Foreign relations of Turkey
- Turkish Trade Office in Taipei
- Taipei Economic and Cultural Mission in Ankara
- Category:Taiwan–Turkey relations
