= Eutelsat Quantum =

Communications satellite

- Mission type: Communications
- Operator: Eutelsat
- COSPAR ID: 2021-069B
- SATCAT no.: 49056

Spacecraft properties
- Spacecraft: Eutelsat Quantum
- Bus: GMP-T
- Manufacturer: SSTL
- Launch mass: 3461 kg
- Payload mass: ~450 kg
- Power: 5500 watts

Start of mission
- Launch date: 2021-07-30, 21:00 UTC
- Rocket: Ariane flight VA254
- Launch site: ELA-3
- Contractor: Arianespace

Orbital parameters
- Reference system: geosynchronous
- Regime: GEO
- Slot: 48° East (planned)
- Semi-major axis: 42165 km

Transponders
- Band: Ku-band
- Coverage area: Middle East, North Africa

Eutelsat Quantum is a communications satellite developed in the framework of a public-private partnership between the European Space Agency, Eutelsat and Airbus Defence and Space. Operated by Eutelsat, its design allows for it to reconfigure its radios coverage zone and alter its performance according its needs. It is located in a geostationary orbit and its longitude may be modified to cover any region in the world.

The satellite was launched on 30 July 2021 by an Ariane 5 rocket, together with the Brazilian Star One D2 satellite. Quantum is Eutelsat's 36th and Airbus Defence and Space's 132nd satellite launched by Arianespace.

The satellite uses conventional chemical thrusters. The payload, which operates in the Ku-band, has a power rating of 5 kW. A key component of the satellite is its phased-array antenna, which was produced by Airbus's Spanish division CASA.

== In-orbit reconfigurability ==
The payload allows for the redefinition of its Ku-band beams with configurable coverage in order to follow targets (ships, aircraft, vehicles, troops) and provide them with mobile communications.

Besides coverage, bandwidth may also be modulated in terms of power and frequencies. The satellites also offers detection mitigation measures against radio jamming.

Finally, the high responsiveness will also bring benefits to governments in the event of natural disasters or surveillance operations.

== History ==
The contract establishing the public-private partnership between ESA, Eutelsat and Airbus Defence and Space was signed on 9 July 2015 in the offices of the European Centre for Space Applications and Telecommunications in Harwell, near Oxford in the United Kingdom. It established the role of Eutelsat in the exploitation and commercialization of the new satellite, and Airbus's in the design and production. Airbus designs the payload in its premises in Portsmouth using the new “GMPT” platform developed in Guildford by its Surrey Satellite Technology subsidiary. This project is supported by ESA and the UK Space Agency in the scope of the ARTES programme for a launch initially planned for 2019.

The development of the antenna is delayed and requires four years to the CASA division of Airbus and its industrial partners (CRISA, Arquimea and GMV) with the support of the Industrial Centre for Technology Development (CDTI). The Ku-band active antenna, featuring eight independent reconfigurable beams, is unveiled in Madrid on 21 November 2019 and named ELSA+ (ELectronically Steerable Antenna+). The conducted works rely on previous accomplishments of Airbus in this field, especially the DRA/ELSA instrument designed for Hispasat 36W1, the IRMA (In-orbit Reconfigurable Multibeam Antenna) antenna for the Spainsat military satellite, and Gaia's active antenna.

Quantum was assembled and tested between 2019 and 2020 in the premises of Airbus DS in Toulouse, from where it was sent on 30 June 2021 to the Guiana Space Centre, before being launched successfully on 30 July 2021 on board Ariane 5 flight VA254.

== See also ==
- Liste of satellites in geosynchronous orbit
- Timeline of artificial satellites and space probes
