= Eutelsat Konnect VHTS =

Eutelsat telecommunications satellite

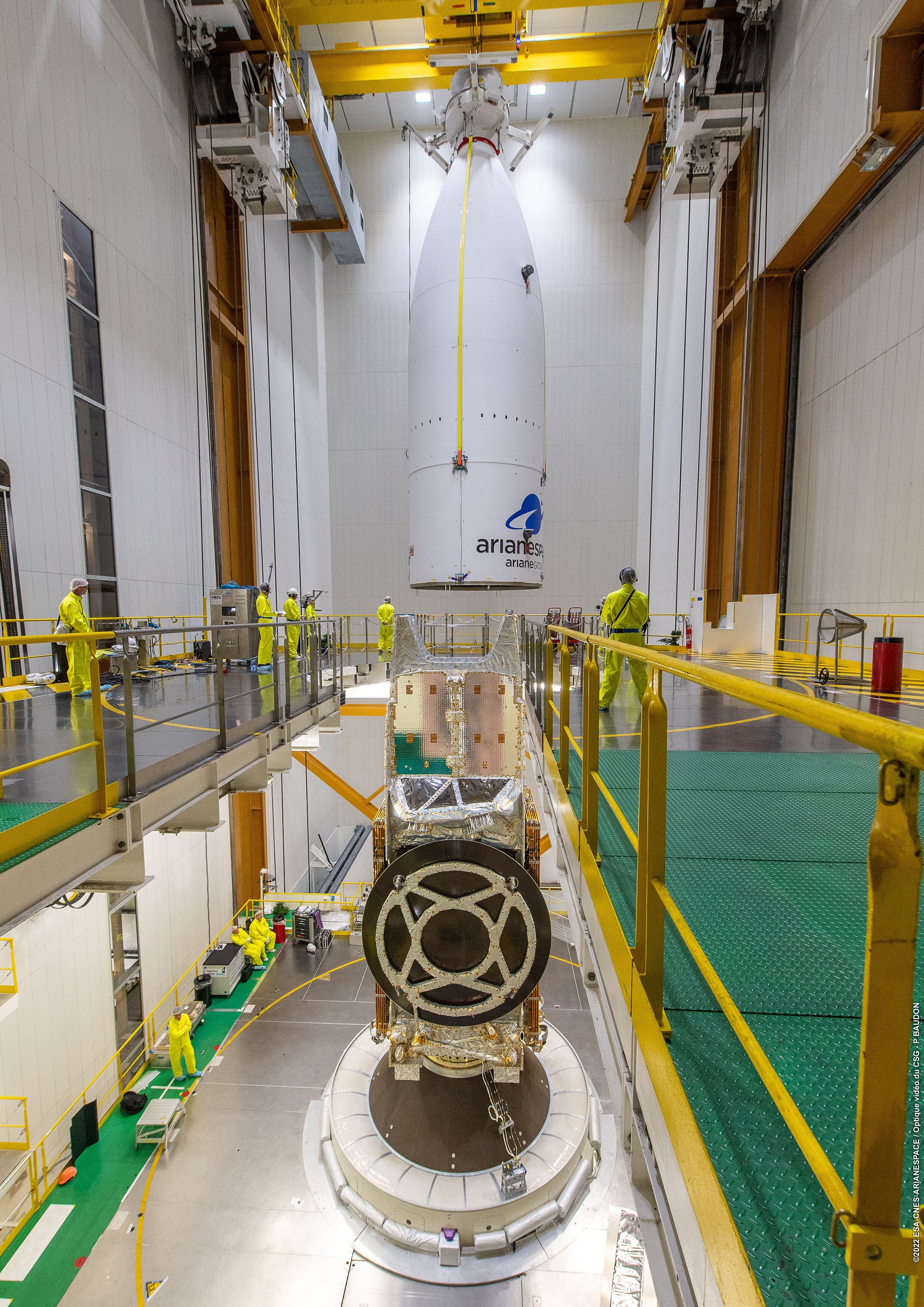
- Eutelsat Konnect VHTS before encapsulation into the fairing of Ariane 5
- Mission type: Communication
- Operator: Eutelsat
- COSPAR ID: 2022-110A
- SATCAT no.: 53765
- Mission duration: 15 years (planned)

Spacecraft properties
- Spacecraft type: SB NEO 200
- Bus: Spacebus NEO
- Manufacturer: Thales Alenia Space
- Launch mass: 6396 kg

Start of mission
- Launch date: 7 September 2022, 21:45 UTC
- Rocket: Ariane 5 ECA+ (VA-258)
- Launch site: Kourou, ELA-3
- Contractor: Arianespace

Orbital parameters
- Reference system: Geocentric orbit
- Regime: Geostationary orbit
- Longitude: 2.7° East

Transponders
- Band: Ka-band
- Coverage area: EMEA

Eutelsat Konnect VHTS is a geostationary communications satellite operated by Eutelsat. Launched in September 2022, it is a Very High Throughput Satellite (VHTS) designed to provide high-speed broadband internet, in-flight connectivity, maritime services, and secure government communications across Europe, North Africa, and the Middle East. Built by Thales Alenia Space on the all-electric Spacebus NEO platform, it features the most powerful on-board digital processor ever placed in orbit, enabling dynamic resource allocation and a total throughput of 500 Gbit/s in the Ka-band.

== Launch ==
Konnect VHTS was launched on 7 September 2022 (UTC) aboard an Ariane 5 ECA from the Guiana Space Centre in Kourou, French Guiana. The flight, designated VA-258, successfully placed the satellite into geostationary transfer orbit. It reached its operational geostationary orbit at 2.7° East after a series of electric orbit-raising maneuvers.

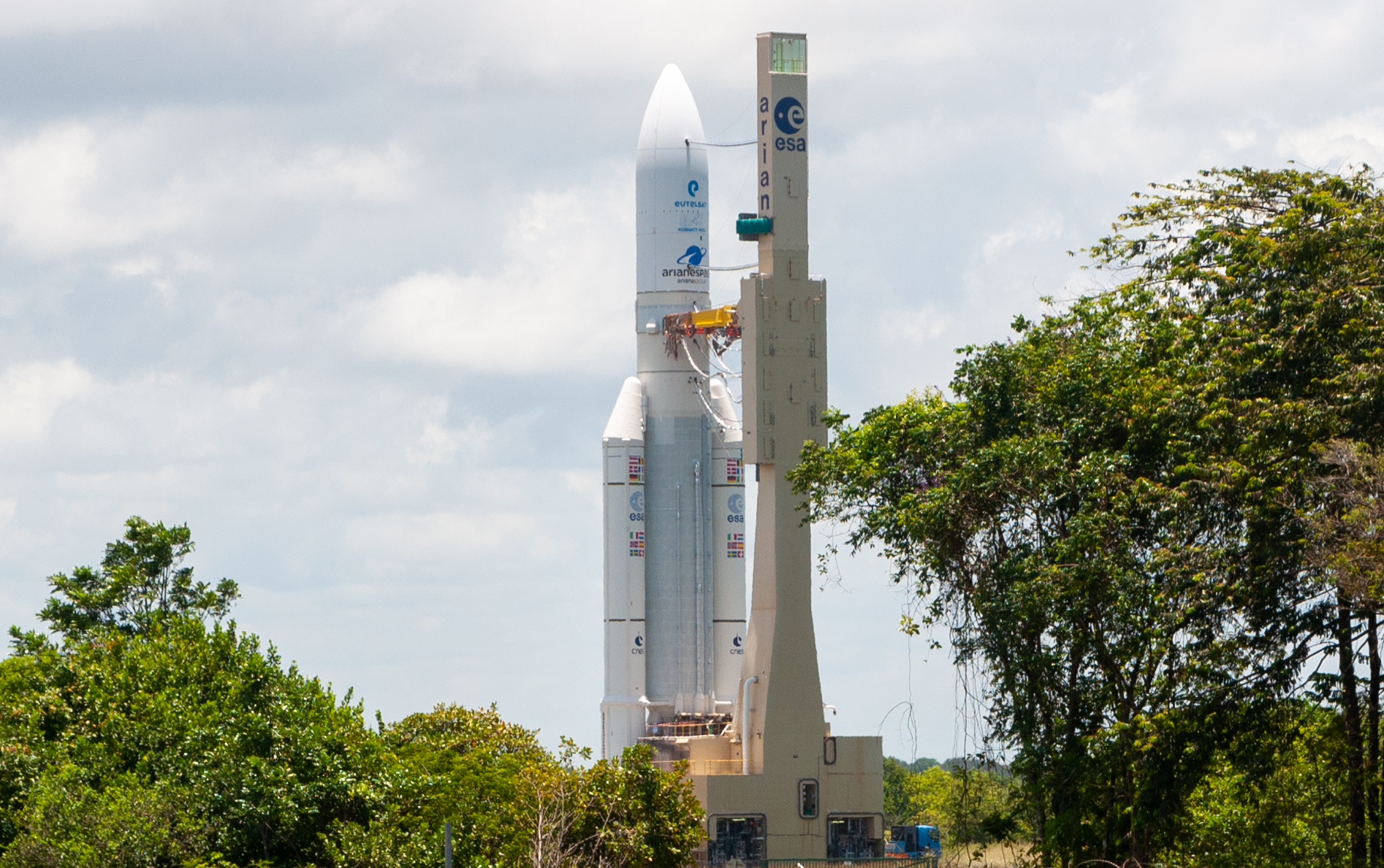
Ariane 5 with Eutelsat Konnect VHTS transfer to the pad

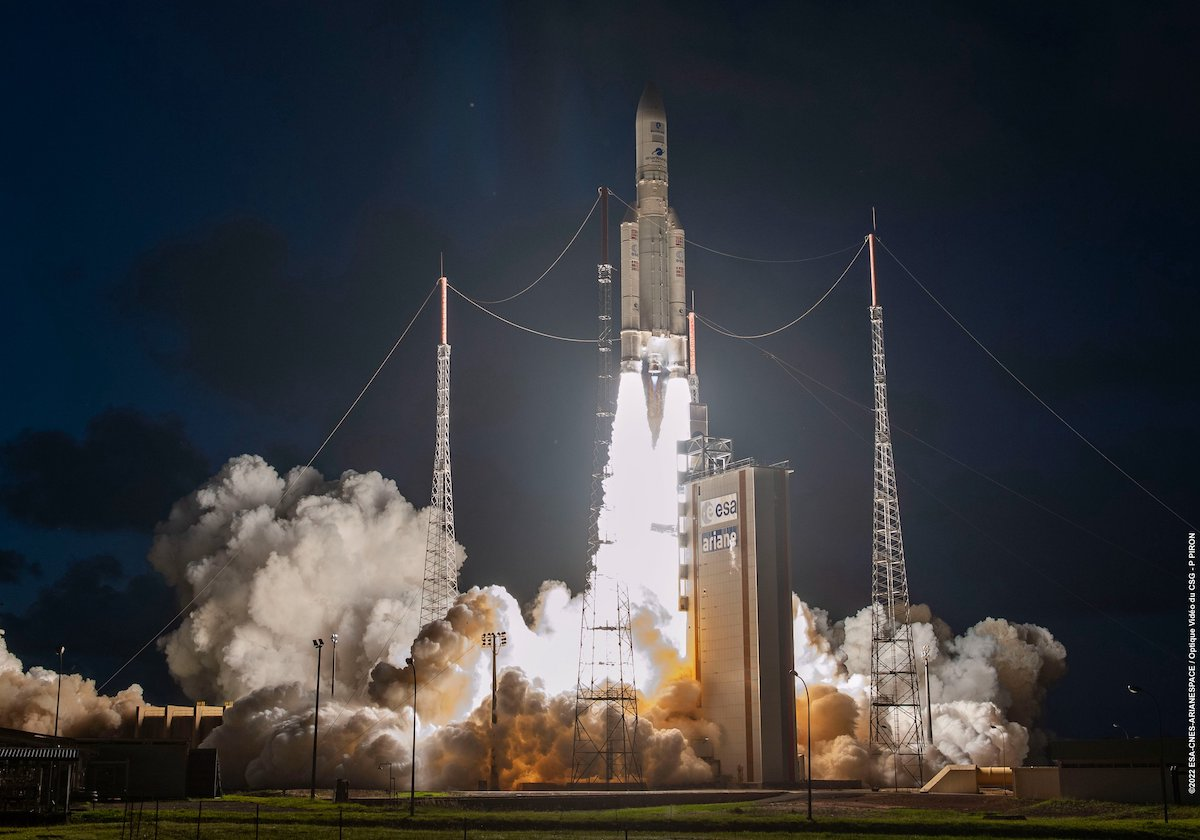
Liftoff of Ariane 5 with Eutelsat Konnect VHTS

== Status ==
Konnect VHTS entered full commercial service in October 2023. Initial deployments focused on consumer broadband in partnership with distributors in France, Italy, and Spain. However, competition from LEO constellations such as Starlink and OneWeb (Merged with Eutelsat in 2023) impacted uptake in the residential segment. Despite this, Eutelsat secured an agreement with Türksat for in-flight connectivity using the Konnect VHTS satellite in 2025.
