= Change of gauge (aviation) =

Changing aircraft without changing the flight number

In air transport, a change of gauge for a passenger or cargo flight is a change of aircraft that retains the same flight number. The term is borrowed from the rail transport practice of gauge change. When a feeder flight connects to a flight on a larger aircraft, this is sometimes called a funnel flight.

An example of a change-of-gauge flight from a larger to a smaller aircraft in the early 1970s is found in the Pan American World Airways (Pan Am) April 29, 1973, system timetable, with Pan Am flight 295 from New York John F. Kennedy International Airport (JFK) nonstop to San Juan, Puerto Rico (SJU) being operated with a Boeing 747, with the continuation of flight 295 from San Juan nonstop to Port of Spain (POS) being operated with a Boeing 727 with through passengers from New York to Port of Spain changing aircraft in San Juan.

A Y-type change of gauge is one where a flight has two flight numbers and transfers into two other flights with different destinations. For example, flight number 100 may fly Boston–Paris–Athens, and flight number 200 may fly Boston–Paris–Rome, with the Boston–Paris leg being on the same aircraft in both cases.

Some passengers, such as persons with disabilities or who are otherwise not disposed to make a connection, prefer to book on flights without a change of aircraft. However, passengers could incorrectly assume that if they are traveling on a single flight number they will not be required to change planes. Single flight numbers are typically used for an originating domestic to international destination or the return (e.g., San Francisco to Chicago to Paris).

== United States ==
As of 2001, six U.S. based airlines, being American Airlines, Continental Airlines, Delta Air Lines, Northwest Airlines, US Airways, and United Airlines, had flights that featured a change of gauge. Title 14 CFR Part 258, "Disclosure of Change of Gauge Services," requires air carriers to disclose to passengers, travelling on a single flight number, if they will be required to change planes during the flight. Part 258 requires the air carriers to inform the consumer that there is a change of gauge in the itinerary before the reservation is made.

== See also ==
- Direct flight
- Codeshare agreement
