= Ariane flight VA261 =

Last launch of the Ariane 5 rocket

Ariane 5 ECA+ launch
- Launch: 5 July 2023, 22:00 UTC
- Operator: Arianespace
- Pad: Guiana Space Centre, ELA-3
- Payload: (Germany) Heinrich Hertz (France) Syracuse-4B
- Outcome: Success

Components
- Serial no.: 5119

Ariane launches

Ariane flight VA261 was an Ariane 5 rocket flight that launched the Heinrich Hertz and Syracuse-4B for customers DLR and DGA into space on 5 July 2023. It was the 117th and last Ariane 5 rocket launch.

== Preparation ==
In May 2023, the core stage for the last Ariane 5 launch arrived at Kourou, French Guiana for LVOS and then the two SRB's and the upper cryogenic stage was integrated shortly after. After completing all integration work the launch date was set for 15 June but due to a problem in the booster separation system, the launch was delayed. The next launch date was announced for 4 July. On 3 July the rocket was rolled out to the pad. However, the launch was postponed by one day due to weather.

== Launch ==
The rocket was launched from the ELA-3 launch pad of the Guiana Space Centre on 5 July 2023 at 22:00 UTC. The launch was called perfect after delivering the payloads to desired orbit.

After the launch there were concerns on the availability of European launch vehicles as the new Vega C rocket has suffered a launch failure on its recent VV22 launch while carrying Pléiades Neo 5 & 6 for Airbus Defence and Space, the Ariane 6 rocket was delayed for first flight, and only two Vega flights remained in the manifest.

== See also ==
- List of Ariane launches
