= Home of the Youth =

Uyghur militant group

Home of the Youth, also known as the Xinjiang Hamas, is a militant Uyghur organization operating in Turkey that advocates the creation of an independent Turkestan in Central Asia and Xinjiang, People's Republic of China. The organization's leaders say there are over 2,000 members.
