= Codeshare agreement =

Partnership in aviation

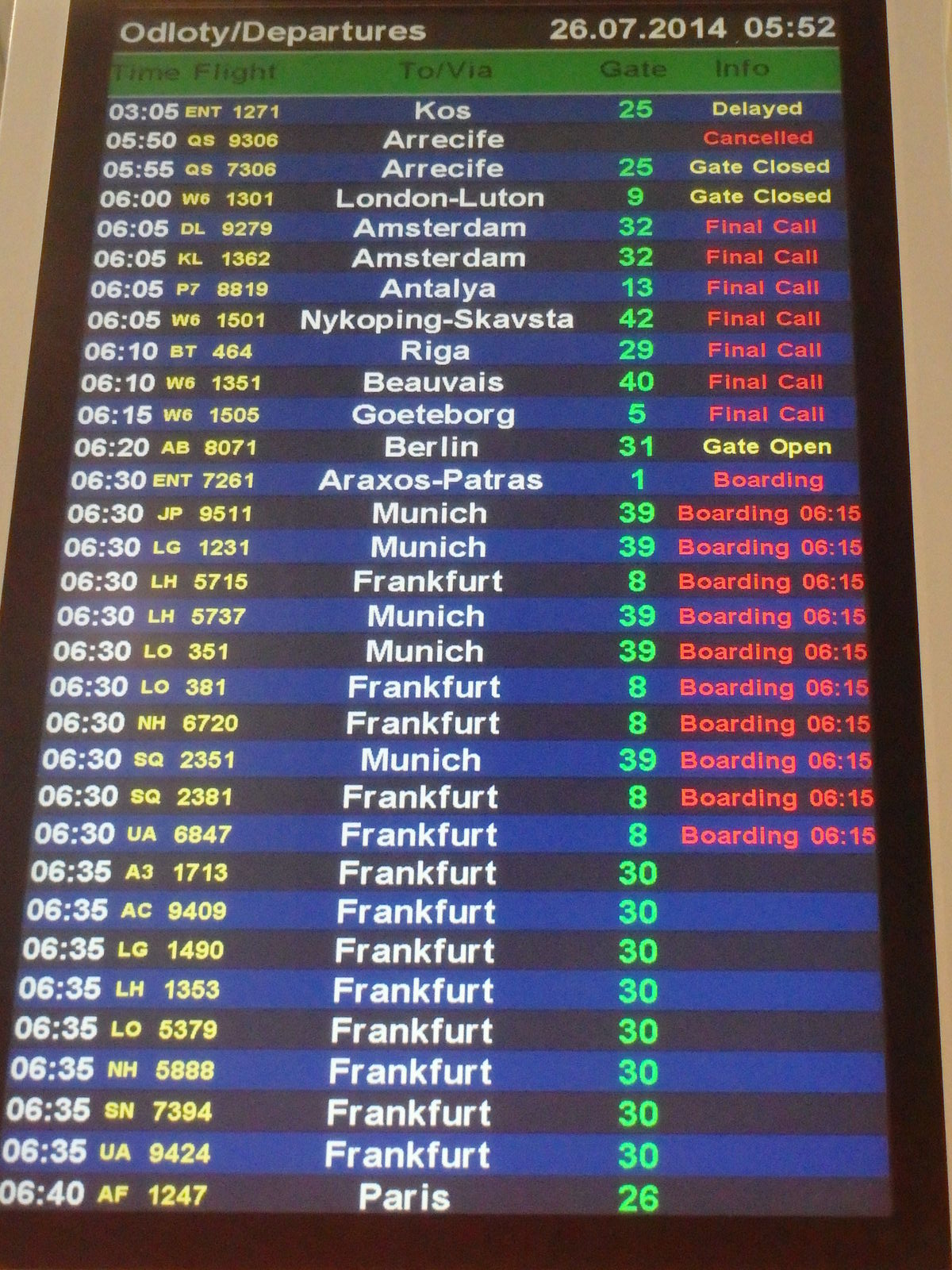
An information display showing code-shared flights (indicated by multiple flight numbers at identical times and gate numbers), at Warsaw Chopin Airport.

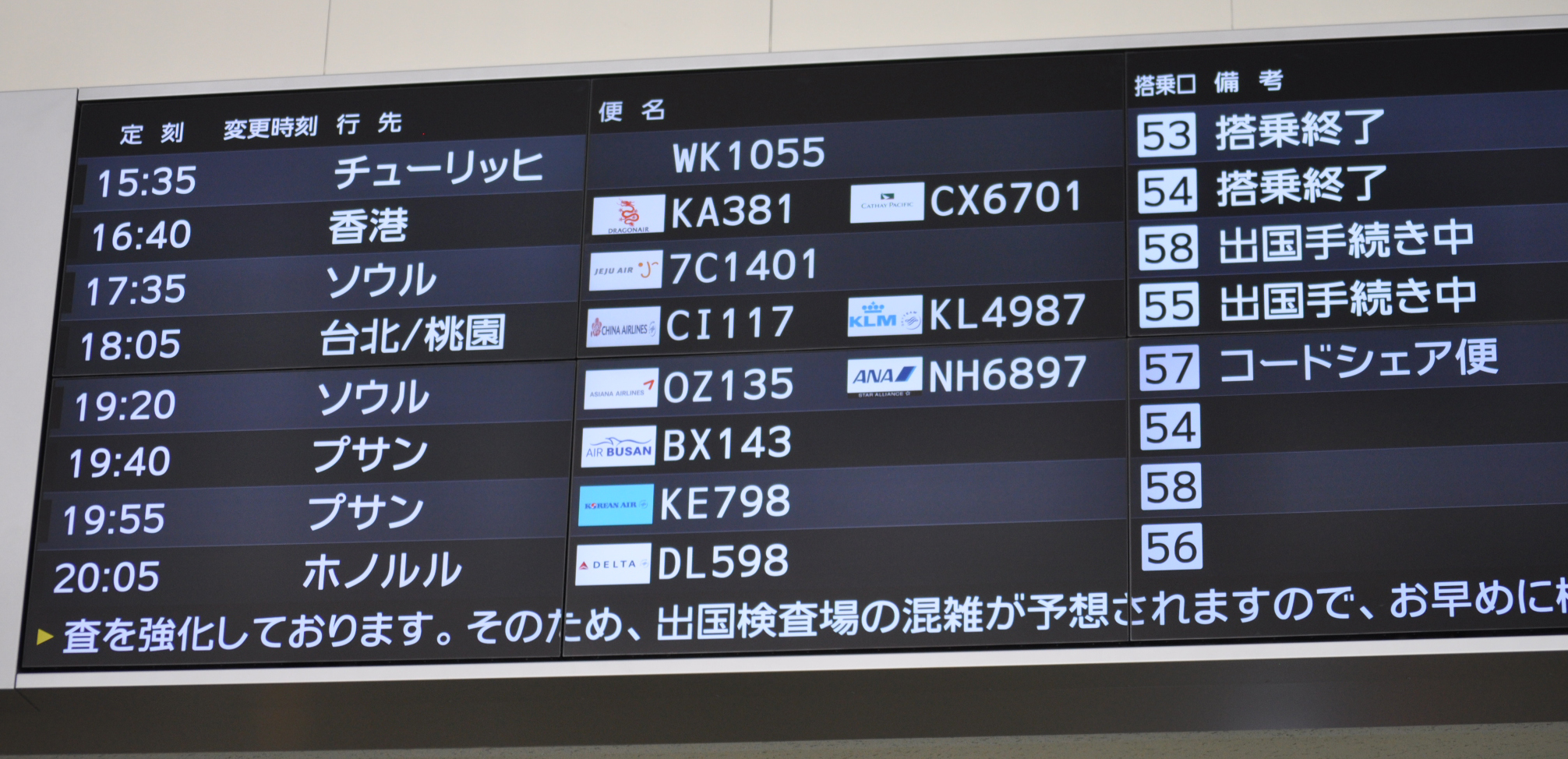
An information display showing code-shared flights (indicated by multiple flight numbers in a single time slot), at Fukuoka Airport.

A codeshare agreement, also known as codeshare, is a business arrangement, common in the aviation industry, in which two or more airlines publish and market the same flight under their own airline designator and flight number (the "airline flight code") as part of their published timetable or schedule. Typically, a flight is operated by one airline (technically called an "administrating carrier" or "operating carrier") while seats are sold for the flight by all cooperating airlines using their own designator and flight number.

The term "code" refers to the identifier used in a flight schedule, generally the two-character IATA airline designator code and flight number. Thus, XX224 (flight number 224 operated by the airline XX), might also be sold by airline YY as YY568 and by ZZ as ZZ9876. Airlines YY and ZZ are in this case called "marketing airlines" (sometimes abbreviated MKT CXR for "marketing carrier").

Most of the major airlines today have code sharing partnerships with other airlines, and code sharing is a key feature of the major airline alliances. Typically, code-sharing agreements are also part of the commercial agreements between airlines in the same airline alliances.

== History ==
In 1967, Richard A. Henson’s Hagerstown Commuter airline joined with US Airways predecessor, regional Allegheny Airlines, in the nation's first codeshare relationship. The term "code sharing" or "codeshare" was coined in 1989 by Qantas and American Airlines, and in 1990 the two firms provided their first codeshare flights between an array of Australian and U.S. cities. Code sharing has become widespread in the airline industry since then, particularly in the wake of the formation of large airline alliances. These alliances have extensive codesharing and networked frequent flyer programs.

== Terminology ==
Under a code sharing agreement, the airline that administers the flight (the one holding the operational permissions, airport slots and planning/controlling the flight and responsible for the ground handling services) is commonly called the operating carrier, often abbreviated OPE CXR, even though the IATA SSIM term "administrating carrier" is more precise. The reason for this is that a third carrier may be involved, typically in the case that the airline originally planning to operate the flight needs to hire a subcontractor to operate the flight on their behalf (typically a wet lease, meaning an aircraft is leased with crew and all facilities to fly, commonly due to capacity limitations, technical problems etc.) In this case, the airline carrying the passenger should be designated the operating carrier, since it is the one carrying the passengers/cargo.

When a flight is sold under several designators and flight numbers as described above, the one published by the "administrating carrier" is commonly called a "prime flight" (as opposed to a codeshare marketing flight).

== Reasons and advantages ==
Under a code sharing agreement, participating airlines can present a common flight number for several reasons, including:

=== For passengers ===
- Connecting flights: This provides clearer routing for the customer, allowing a customer to book travel from point A to C through point B under one carrier's code, instead of a customer booking from point A to B under one code, and from point B to C under another code. This is not only a superficial addition as cooperating airlines also strive to synchronize their schedules.
- More alternatives: Codeshare benefits passengers by offering them more travel choices, potentially more convenient departure and arrival times, and easier connections across the member airlines' networks.
- More points/miles: Frequent flyer benefits typically remain in place under codeshare agreements, allowing passengers to earn and redeem points or miles across multiple participating airlines.

=== For airlines ===
- Flights from both airlines that fly the same route: this provides an apparent increase in the frequency of service on the route by one airline.
- Perceived service to non-serviced markets: this provides a method for carriers who do not operate their own aircraft on a given route to gain exposure in the market through display of their flight numbers.

== Types of code sharing ==
There are several types of code sharing arrangements:

- Block space codeshare: A commercial (marketing) airline purchases a fixed number of seats from the administrating (operating/prime) carrier. A fixed price is typically paid, and the seats are kept away from the administrating carrier's inventory. The marketing airline decides on its own which booking classes the seats are sold in (the block of seats are optimized just like another aircraft cabin).
- Free flow codeshare: The airlines' inventory and reservation systems communicate in real-time by messaging, commonly IATA AIRIMP/PADIS messaging (TTY and EDIFACT). A booking class mapping is defined between the airlines. No seats are locked to any of the airlines, and any airline can sell any number of seats.
- Capped free flow: Basically the same as above, but capping (maximum number of seats) is defined for each of the marketing airlines participating in the codeshare with the administrating carrier.

== Competitive concerns ==
Much competition in the airline industry revolves around ticket sales (also known as "seat booking") strategies (revenue management, variable pricing, and geo-marketing). Criticism has been leveled against code sharing by consumer organizations and national departments of trade since it is claimed to be confusing and not transparent to passengers.

== Air-rail alliances ==
There are also code sharing arrangements between airlines and railway companies, formally known as air-rail alliances, and commonly marketed as "Rail & Fly" due to the popularity of the Deutsche Bahn codeshare with many airlines. They involve some integration of both types of transport, e.g., in finding the fastest connection and allowing the transfer between plane and train using a single ticket. This allows passengers to book a whole journey at the same time, often for a discounted price compared to separate tickets.

== See also ==
- Change of gauge (aviation)
- Interlining
