= Direct flight =

Aircraft movement without a change in airline number

A direct flight in the aviation industry is a flight between two airports with no change in flight number, but which may include stops at intermediate airports. A stop may either be to get new passengers (or allow some to disembark) or a technical stop over (i.e., for refuelling). When there is a change in flight number, the subsequent flight is called a "connecting flight". A non-stop flight is one with no intermediate stops.

== General aspects ==
Illustration of a San Francisco to Singapore "non-stop" flight (green) versus a "direct" flight (purple)

The term "direct flight" is not legally defined in the United States, but since the 1970s the Official Airline Guides have defined the term simply as a flight with a single flight number. (In earlier years "direct" in the OAG meant "no plane change".) While so-called "direct" flights may involve changes of aircraft (called a "change of gauge") or even changes of airline at the intermediate point, they are typically—but not always—differentiated from "connecting flights" in that the airline will enforce a dependency between multiple legs of the flight, so that leg two cannot operate if leg one has failed to arrive at the departure airport. Direct flights involving aircraft changes typically change to planes at adjoining or nearby gates.

Airlines, airports, and security authorities in a particular country enforce different policies on whether passengers may stay on the aircraft on routes that do not involve a change of aircraft. For example, flights that require stopover merely for refuelling usually do not permit passengers to disembark from the aircraft. On the other hand, flights where there is a change of aircraft may require that passengers disembark and stay at a holding area for security reasons and a proper headcount. A direct flight with stopovers may or may not involve a change in the flight crew.

Airlines may also market connections to a consolidation airport, usually an airline hub, where the continuation of the flight from multiple aircraft is to a single aircraft listed under several flight numbers. Unlike traditional direct flights, multiple legs of such 'direct' flight actually operate as individual/independent legs, such that the latter leg can operate without any dependency or consideration of the former leg. In other words, the flight that comprises the latter leg can depart even if the flight that comprised the former leg failed to arrive.

== See also ==
- Domestic flight
- Mainline (air travel)
