= List of Ariane launches (2020–2029) =

This is a list of launches performed or scheduled to be performed by Ariane rocket family between 2020 and 2029. During this time, the Ariane 5 was retired in favour of the Ariane 6.

Four Ariane 6 launches took place in 2025, up to eight are planned for 2026, with an eventual ramp to eleven launches per year planned.

10 launches are planned for 2027. Studies are underway to increase the cadence to 12, 15, or 20 launches after several years. This is a significant increase over the targeted seven annual launches of Ariane 5.

== Launch statistics ==
=== Rocket configurations ===
- Ariane 5 ECA+
- Ariane 62
- Ariane 64
- Ariane 64 Block 2

=== Launch outcomes & planned launches ===
- Failure
- Partial failure
- Success
- Planned

== Launch history ==
=== Ariane 5 (2020–2023) ===
Flight No.	Date and Time (UTC)	Version, Serial No.	Launch site	Payload	Payload mass	Orbit	Customer	Launch outcome
VA251	16 January 2020; 21:05	Ariane 5 ECA+ 5110	Guiana, ELA‑3	Eutelsat Konnect; GSAT-30	6,976 kg	GTO	Eutelsat; ISRO	Success
VA251	Eutelsat communications satellite and ISRO communications satellite.							
VA252	18 February 2020; 22:18	Ariane 5 ECA+ 5111	Guiana, ELA‑3	JCSAT-17; GEO-KOMPSAT 2B	9,236 kg	GTO	SKY Perfect JSAT; KARI	Success
VA252	SKY Perfect JSAT communications satellite and KARI meteorological satellite.							
VA253	15 August 2020; 22:04	Ariane 5 ECA+ 5112	Guiana, ELA‑3	Galaxy 30; MEV-2; BSAT-4b	9,703 kg	GTO	Intelsat; Northrop Grumman; BSAT	Success
VA253	Flight VA253 was planned to launch in June 2020. However, launch campaign activities were significantly affected by the COVID-19 pandemic. To prevent the spread in French Guiana and protect Centre Spatial Guyanais employees, all launch activities were suspended on 16 March 2020. Operations for Vega flight VV16 and Ariane 5 flight VA253 could not resume until 28 April 2020. VA253 activities were listed among the top priorities at the reopening of the Guiana Space Center on 11 May 2020. The launch was rescheduled for end of July 2020 to place the satellites into a geostationary transfer orbit from which they will eventually be placed into geostationary orbit through their own propulsion. The flight was again aborted on 28 July 2020, due to a "red" warning in the system, resulting from a sensor problem related to LH_{2} tank on the core stage. American satellite operator Intelsat and Japanese Broadcasting Satellite System Corporation (B-SAT) are the customers for Ariane flight VA253. Galaxy 30 is a communications satellite built by Northrop Grumman Innovation Systems (formerly Orbital ATK) on the GEOStar-2 platform for Intelsat. It has C-band, K_{u}-band, K_{a}-band payloads, as well as a WAAS payload for a mass of 3,325 kilograms (7,330 lb). Built in satellite manufacturing facility in Dulles, Virginia, it will primarily serve video markets in North America. As per Intelsat/Arianespace contract announced in January 2018, Galaxy 30 would share the upper berth of the Ariane 5 ECA rocket with MEV-2, which is a Northrop Grumman second satellite servicing vehicle, identical to MEV-1. With a mass of 2,326 kilograms (5,128 lb), it would begin a five-year mission to extend the lifetime of Intelsat 10-02. MEV-2 received FCC authorization on 25 March 2020. BSAT-4b is the second communications satellite of the fourth generation B-SAT, built by SSL (company) on its SSL 1300 platform. It has 24 K_{u}-band transponders and mass of 3,520 kilograms (7,760 lb).							
VA254	30 July 2021; 21:00	Ariane 5 ECA+ 5113	Guiana, ELA‑3	Eutelsat Quantum; Star One D2	10,515 kg	GTO	Eutelsat; Star One	Success
VA254	Brazilian Satellite operator Embratel and European Eutelsat were customers on the VA254 flight. Eutelsat Quantum is a European re-programmable telecommunications satellite equipped with Ku-band payload, developed in a public-private partnership between the European Space Agency (ESA), Eutelsat and Airbus Defence and Space. It had a launch mass of approximately 3,461 kilograms (7,630 lb) and a design lifetime of 15 years. Star One D2 is a telecommunications satellite equipped with C-, Ku-, Ka- and X-band payloads for high-speed telecommunications, television broadcast and fast broadband in South America, Mexico, Central America, and parts of the Atlantic Ocean. It had a launch mass of approximately 6,190 kilograms (13,650 lb) and a design lifetime of 15 years. The target orbit was a geosynchronous transfer orbit with an apogee altitude of 250 kilometres (160 mi) and a perigee altitude of 35,726 kilometres (22,199 mi), at an inclination of 3°. The mission was planned to last 36 minutes and 24 seconds. (Note: Statistics for flight VA254: 330th Arianespace launch (6th in 2021); 254th Ariane launch (1st in 2021); 110th Ariane 5 launch (1st in 2021); 947th and 948th satellites put in orbit by Arianespace (151st and 152nd in 2021); 12th Embratel satellite launched by Arianespace; 36th Eutelsat satellite launched by Arianespace; 85th consecutive rated operation of the Vulcain 2 engine; 110th consecutive rated operation of the EAP solid rocket boosters; 150th consecutive rated operation of the HM7B engine)							
VA255	24 October 2021; 02:10	Ariane 5 ECA+ 5115	Guiana, ELA‑3	SES-17; Syracuse 4A	10,264 kg	GTO	SES S.A. DGA	Success
VA255	SES S.A. communications satellite and Direction générale de l'armement military communications satellite.							
VA256	25 December 2021; 12:20	Ariane 5 ECA+ 5114	Guiana, ELA‑3	James Webb Space Telescope	6,161.4 kg	Sun–Earth L_{2}	NASA / ESA / CSA / STScI	Success
VA256	James Webb Space Telescope.							
VA257	22 June 2022; 21:50	Ariane 5 ECA+ 5116	Guiana, ELA‑3	MEASAT-3d; GSAT-24	9,829 kg	GTO	MEASAT; NSIL / Tata Play	Success
VA257	MEASAT communications satellite and NSIL communications satellite.							
VA258	7 September 2022; 21:45	Ariane 5 ECA+ 5117	Guiana, ELA‑3	Eutelsat Konnect VHTS	6,400 kg	GTO	Eutelsat	Success
VA258	Eutelsat communications satellite.							
VA259	13 December 2022; 20:30	Ariane 5 ECA+ 5118	Guiana, ELA‑3	Galaxy 35; Galaxy 36; MTG-I1	10,972 kg	GTO	Intelsat; EUMETSAT	Success
VA259	Two Intelsat communications satellites and EUMETSAT meteorological satellite.							
VA260	14 April 2023; 12:14	Ariane 5 ECA+ 5120	Guiana, ELA‑3	Jupiter Icy Moons Explorer (JUICE)	5,963 kg	Jovicentric	ESA	Success
VA260	Jupiter Icy Moons Explorer.							
VA261	5 July 2023; 22:00	Ariane 5 ECA+ 5119	Guiana, ELA‑3	Syracuse 4B (Comsat-NG 2); Heinrich Hertz (H2Sat)	6,950 kg	GTO	DGA; DLR	Success
VA261	Ariane 5's last mission.							

=== Ariane 6 (2024–present) ===
Flight No.	Launch (UTC)	Version, Serial No.	Launch site	Payload	Payload mass	Orbit	Customer	Launch outcome
VA262	9 July 2024; 19:00	Ariane 62; L6001	Guiana, ELA‑4	Multiple rideshare payloads	1,600 kg (3,500 lb)	LEO	Various	Partial failure
VA262	Maiden flight of Ariane 6. It was a flight test carrying a mass simulator plus a number of small cubesats and other experiments as rideshare payloads. Rocket launched successfully to orbit and upper stage performed a second burn to release cubesats. During attempt to perform a third burn to deorbit the upper stage, the rocket's auxiliary propulsion system failed. This failure prevented the upper stage from relighting.							
VA263	6 March 2025; 16:24	Ariane 62; L6002	Guiana, ELA‑4	CSO-3	3,655 kg (8,058 lb)	SSO	CNES / DGA	Success
VA263	French military reconnaissance satellite. First recompensed launch for Ariane 6. After releasing the satellite following two burns of the upper stage, the Vinci engine successfully completed a third burn to reenter Earth's atmosphere, a maneuver that had failed in the first Ariane 6 flight.							
VA264	13 August 2025; 00:37	Ariane 62; L6003	Guiana, ELA‑4	MetOp-SG A1/Sentinel-5A	4,040 kg (8,910 lb)	SSO	EUMETSAT	Success
VA264	Second-generation polar-orbiting meteorological satellite system to replace the first-generation METOP satellites. First Ariane 6 night launch.							
VA265	4 November 2025; 21:02	Ariane 62; L6005	Guiana, ELA‑4	Sentinel-1D	2,184 kg (4,815 lb)	SSO	ESA	Success
VA265	Radar imaging satellite. Second of two additional satellites in the Sentinel-1 constellation, part of the Copernicus programme on Earth observation. The satellite is equipped with a C-SAR sensor, capable of providing high-resolution imagery regardless of weather conditions.							
VA266	17 December 2025; 05:01	Ariane 62; L6004	Guiana, ELA‑4	Galileo L14	1,466 kg (3,232 lb)	MEO	ESA	Success
VA266	FM33 and FM34 satellites for Galileo GNSS.							
VA267	12 February 2026; 16:45	Ariane 64L; L6006	Guiana, ELA‑4	LeoSat × 32 (LE-01)	~20,000 kg (44,000 lb)	LEO	Amazon (Amazon Leo)	Success
VA267	First Ariane 64 launch, first use of long fairing, and first Ariane launch for Amazon Leo, formerly known as Project Kuiper.							
VA268	30 April 2026; 08:57	Ariane 64L; L6007	Guiana, ELA‑4	LeoSat × 32 (LE-02)	~20,000 kg (44,000 lb)	LEO	Amazon (Amazon Leo)	Success
VA268	Last scheduled use of P120C boosters for Amazon Leo. Payload delivered 12 March 2026. First Ariane 64 night launch.							
VA269	17 June 2026; 12:21	Ariane 64L Block 2 L6009	Guiana, ELA‑4	LeoSat × 36 (LE-03)	~22,000 kg (49,000 lb)	LEO	Amazon (Amazon Leo)	Success
VA269	First Ariane 64 Block 2 launch using P160C boosters. Heaviest payload ever launched by Ariane.							
VA270	27 August 2026; 20:11	Ariane 62; L6008	Guiana, ELA‑4	MTG-I2	3,760 kg (8,290 lb)	GTO	EUMETSAT	Success
VA270	First flight to geostationary transfer orbit.							

== Planned launches ==
Launch (UTC)	Type	Payload	Orbit	Customers
NET 23 November 2026	Ariane 64L Block 2	LeoSat × 36 (LE-04)	LEO	Amazon (Amazon Leo)
November 2026	Ariane 62	MetOp-SG-B1	SSO	EUMETSAT
December 2026	Ariane 62	Galileo L15	MEO	ESA
December 2026	Two FOC satellites			
20 April 2027	Ariane 62	PLATO	Sun–Earth L_{2}	ESA
20 April 2027	HENON CubeSat as secondary payload			
Q1 2027	Ariane 62	Galileo L16	MEO	ESA
Q1 2027	Two FOC satellites			
H2 2027	Ariane 6	NEXUS-1	GTO	Katalyst
2027	Ariane 62 Block 2	Galileo L17	MEO	ESA
2027	First launch of Galileo Second Generation (GSG) satellites.			
2027	Ariane 62 Block 2	Galileo L18	MEO	ESA
2027	Two GSG satellites			
2027	Ariane 64	OneWeb	Polar	Eutelsat
August 2028	Ariane 64	Comet Interceptor	Sun–Earth L_{2}	ESA
November 2028	Ariane 64	Nyx ALADDIN	LEO	The Exploration Company
H2 2028	Ariane 64	Koreasat 9	GTO	KT Sat
H2 2028	Designated rideshare launch			
2028	Ariane 64	Intelsat 45 (Rideshare)	GTO	Intelsat
2028	Ariane 64	OneWeb	Polar	Eutelsat
2028	Ariane 64	Optus-11	GTO	Optus
2029	Ariane 64	ComSatBw 1B	GTO	Bundeswehr
2029	Ariane 64	ComSatBw 2B	GTO	Bundeswehr
2029	Ariane 64	GovSat-2	GTO	GovSat partnership
2029	Ariane 6	Hellas Sat 5	GTO	Hellas Sat
2031	Ariane 62	ARIEL	Sun–Earth L_{2}	ESA
2031	Ariane 64	Argonaut 1	TLI	ESA
2031	Ariane 64	EnVision	Venusian	ESA
2035	Ariane 64	Athena	Sun–Earth L_{2}, Halo orbit	ESA
2035	Ariane 6	LISA	Heliocentric	ESA
TBD	Ariane 64	Argonaut 2 (NovaMoon)	TLI	ESA
TBD	Ariane 64 Block 2	Amazon Leo (LE-05 to LE-24)	LEO	Amazon (Amazon Leo)
TBD	Satellite internet constellation. Remainder of the 24 contracted Ariane 6 launches for Amazon Leo.			
TBD	Ariane 64	Earth Return Orbiter	Areocentric	ESA
TBD	Ariane 62	EDRS-D	MEO	ESA
TBD	Ariane 62	Electra	GTO	SES S.A. / ESA
TBD	Ariane 64	Multi-Launch Service (MLS) #1 rideshare mission	GTO	TBA
TBD	Ariane 6	Uhura-1 (Node-1) Rideshare	GTO	Skyloom

== See also ==
- List of Vega launches

== Sources ==
- Wade, Mark. "Ariane". Encyclopedia Astronautica. Archived from the original on 7 September 2008.
