= Heinrich Hertz (satellite) =

German Geosynchronous Communications satellite

- Mission type: Communications Technology demonstration
- Operator: DLR
- COSPAR ID: 2023-093A
- SATCAT no.: 57213
- Website: Heinrich Hertz
- Mission duration: Planned: 15 years

Spacecraft properties
- Bus: SmallGEO
- Manufacturer: OHB System
- Launch mass: 3,408 kg (7,513 lb)

Start of mission
- Launch date: 5 July 2023, 22:00 UTC
- Rocket: Ariane 5 ECA (VA-261)
- Launch site: Kourou ELA-3
- Contractor: Arianespace

Orbital parameters
- Reference system: Geocentric
- Regime: GEO

The Heinrich Hertz, also known as H2Sat, is a German national communications satellite launched in 2023 to demonstrate and validate advanced satellite communication technologies in geostationary orbit. Named after the German physicist Heinrich Hertz (1857–94), it is the first dedicated German communications satellite in over two decades and considered as a successor to DFS Kopernikus satellites. The mission is led by the German Aerospace Center (DLR) on behalf of the Federal Ministry for Economic Affairs and Climate Action and with the participation of the Federal Ministry of Defence.

== Launch ==
Heinrich Hertz was launched on July 5, 2023, at 22:00 UTC from the Guiana Space Centre in Kourou, French Guiana, aboard an Ariane 5 ECA rocket as part of its final flight (also carrying the French Syracuse-4B satellite). The satellite has a launch mass of approximately 3,408 kg and is designed for a minimum operational lifetime of 15 years in Geostationary orbit (GEO) at an altitude of about 35,786 km. Its initial target position was 0.5° East longitude, but it has since been repositioned. As of late 2025, it is operating at 63.1° East longitude.

== Timeline ==
On behalf of the Federal Ministry for Economic Affairs and Technology, the Bremen-based satellite manufacturer OHB System AG conducted a feasibility study (Phase 0) of the project. The feasibility study (Phase A) was completed in 2010. OHB System, in partnership with EADS Astrium, was responsible for the overall project. OHB System was also responsible for the satellite bus. Tesat-Spacecom was responsible for the payload, with IABG GmbH and MDA Space as additional partners. The satellite's launch was originally planned for 2015, but was delayed until July 2023. The budget is €310.5 million for construction and launch plus development costs of €11 million from planning phase B and an as yet undetermined sum for 15 years of operation. The satellite bus components are designed for operation for at least 18 years.
