= Flight number =

Airline code for a journey between multiple points

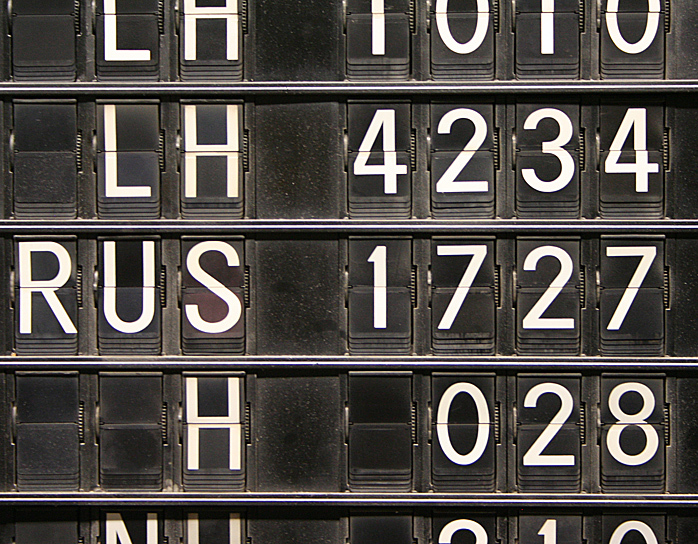
Flight numbers on a split-flap display (Frankfurt airport)

In the aviation industry, a flight number or flight designator is a code for an airline service consisting of a two-character airline designator and a 1 to 4 digit number. For example, QF9 is a Qantas Airways service from Perth, Australia to London Heathrow. A service is called "direct" if it is covered by a single flight number, regardless of the number of stops or equipment changes. For example, QF1 flies from Sydney to Singapore to London on Qantas Airways. A given flight segment may have multiple flight numbers on different airlines under a code-sharing agreement. Strictly speaking, the flight number is just the numerical part, but the term is commonly used to refer to the entire flight designator.

The flight number of the operating carrier of a commercial flight is commonly used in the aircraft's call sign. This is distinct from the aircraft's registration number, which identifies a specific airplane.

== Conventions ==
A number of conventions have been developed for defining flight numbers, although these vary widely from airline to airline, and are increasingly being modified. Eastbound and northbound flights are traditionally assigned even numbers, while westbound and southbound flights have odd numbers. Other airlines will use an odd number for an outbound flight and use the next even number for the reverse inbound flight. For destinations served by multiple flights per day, numbers tend to increase during the day. Hence, a flight from point A to point B might be flight 401 and the return flight from B to A would be 402, while the next pair of flights on the same route would usually be assigned codes 403 and 404.

Flight numbers of less than three digits are often assigned to long-haul or otherwise premium flights. For example, flight number 1 is often used for an airline's "flagship" service (see below for a List of lowest-numbered passenger flights by airlines). However Cathay Pacific assigns flight numbers which are less than 100 for cargo flights.

Four-digit numbers in the range 3000 to 5999 typically represent regional affiliate flights, while numbers larger than 6000 are generally codeshare numbers for flights operated by different airlines or even railways.

Likewise, flight numbers larger than 9000 usually refer to ferry flights; these carry no passengers and are used to relocate aircraft to or from a maintenance base, or from one air travel market to another in order to start new commercial flights. Flight numbers starting with 8 are often used for charter flights, but it always depends on the commercial carrier's choice.

=== Flight numbering system in mainland China ===
The People's Republic of China uses a completely different system for assigning flight segments than most countries; prior to 1988 reformation, there was only one major airline in mainland China, CAAC, which initially used the first digit of the flight number to represent the location of the base (1 North China, 2 Northwest China, 3 South China, 4 Southwest China, 5 East China, and 6 Northeast China) for domestic flights, and the end of the number has an odd digit for departures and an even digit for return trips”. In the 1980s, a second digit joined, indicating the destination of flights (many domestic flights of Air China and China Eastern from their base still follow this rule); one-digit and two-digit flight numbers are usually reserved for executive charters or special mission flights (e.g., the flight carrying the black boxes and American investigators of the China Eastern Airlines Flight 5735 in 2022 used flight numbers CA79 and CA80). With the privatization and expansion of China's civil aviation, in 2004 the CAAC issued a system for allocating flight numbers across the country, with Air China allocated 1XXX, 4XXX, and 9XX, China Eastern 2XXX and 5XXX, China Southern 3XXX and 6XXX, Hainan Airlines 7XXX, Sichuan and Xiamen 8XXX, and stipulating that Chinese airlines should not use the same flight numbers with each other. However, this rule is no longer strictly enforced, as the allocated numbers have become shortage of use.
As a result, there are three special cases in China:
1. Flight number 9XXX may be a regular flight, while smaller number like 500 or 2000 might be used on ferry flights or codeshare ones.
2. Flagship flights do not use one-digit or two-digit flight numbers, and may even be four-digit flight numbers.
3. Flight numbers in the event of an aviation accident will generally not be retired, as seen on Air China Flight 129 which is still active as of January 2025 (albeit using a different type of aircraft). Still, there are exceptions, as with the case of the aforementioned China Eastern Airlines Flight 5735.

The lowest-numbered passenger flight starts at 101 for Air China and 100 for Cathay Pacific. CA 101 is a scheduled daily flight from PEK (Beijing Capital) to HKG (Hong Kong Intl') with an outbound flight of CA 102. Flight CX 100 departs from SYD (Sydney-Kingsford Smith) and arrives at HKG (Hong Kong Intl'). Most of Air China's international flights are numbered 101-999 with an exception of codeshare flights.

== Codeshare ==
In a codeshare, airlines share their aircraft with others, resulting in the flight having more than one flight number on the same sector, and either the same or different flight numbers on joined sectors.

As an example, QF8412 flies from Dubai to Sydney, but it is codeshared with and operated as EK412. Another example is QF3920, which is a flight from Lima, Peru to Santiago, Chile that is also codeshared with LATAM 523.

== List of lowest-numbered passenger flights by airlines ==
Most flights are non-stop from A to B, and few are from A to B then to C (both A–B and B–C have flight number 1). Aircraft type may change due to operation need or unforeseen circumstance.

Airline	IATA Flight No	ICAO Flight No	From	To	Then to (if applicable)	Aircraft Type
Aeroméxico	AM1	AMX1	Mexico City	(Spain) Madrid		Boeing 787-8/787-9
Air Canada	AC1	ACA1	(Canada) Toronto–Pearson	(Japan) Tokyo–Haneda		Boeing 777-300ER
Air Canada Express	QK1	JZA1	(Canada) Montreal	(Canada) Ottawa		Bombardier CRJ900
Air China	CA101	CCA101	(China) Beijing-Capital	Hong Kong		Comac C919
Air France	AF1	AFR1	(United States) New York–JFK	(France) Paris–CDG		Boeing 777-200ER / 777-300ER
Air Japan	NQ1	AJX1	(Japan) Tokyo–Narita	(Thailand) Bangkok–Suvarnabhumi		Boeing 787-8
Air Macau	NX1	AMU1	(China) Beijing–Capital	Macau		Airbus A321
Air New Zealand	NZ1	ANZ1	(United States) New York–JFK	(New Zealand) Auckland		Boeing 787-9
Air Niugini	PX1	ANG1	(Papua New Guinea) Port Moresby	(Australia) Sydney		Boeing 737-800
Air Tahiti Nui	TN1	THT1	(United States) Los Angeles	(French Polynesia) Papeete		Boeing 787-9
Alaska Airlines	AS1	ASA1	(United States) Washington–Reagan	(United States) Seattle		Boeing 737-800
American Airlines	AA1	AAL1	(United States) New York–JFK	(United States) Los Angeles		Airbus A321
Cape Air	9K1	KAP1	(United States) New York–JFK	(United States) Martha's Vineyard	(United States) Nantucket	Cessna 402
Delta Air Lines	DL1	DAL1	(United States) New York–JFK	(United Kingdom) London–Heathrow		Boeing 767-400ER
El Al	LY1	ELY1	(Israel) Tel Aviv	(United States) New York–JFK		Boeing 787-9
Emirates	EK1	UAE1	(United Arab Emirates) Dubai	(United Kingdom) London–Heathrow		Airbus A380-800
Etihad Airways	EY1	ETD1	(United Arab Emirates) Abu Dhabi	(United States) New York–JFK		Airbus A380-800 / Boeing 787-9
FedEx Express	FX1	FDX1	(United Kingdom) London–Stansted	(United States) Memphis		Boeing 777F
Finnair	AY1	FIN1	(Finland) Helsinki	(United States) Los Angeles		Airbus A350-900
Flydubai	FZ1	FDB1	(United Arab Emirates) Dubai	(Qatar) Doha		Boeing 737-MAX 8
Hawaiian Airlines	HA1	HAL1	(United States) Los Angeles	(United States) Honolulu		Airbus A330-200
Japan Airlines	JL1	JAL1	(United States) San Francisco	(Japan) Tokyo–Haneda		Boeing 777-300ER
Japan Transocean Air	NU1	JTA1	(Japan) Osaka−Kansai	(Japan) Okinawa−Naha		Boeing 737-800
JetBlue Airways	B61	JBU1	(United States) New York–JFK	(United States) Fort Lauderdale		Airbus A321-200 / Airbus A320-200
Jetstar	JQ1	JST1	(Australia) Melbourne	(United States) Honolulu		Boeing 787-8
Jin Air	LJ1	JNA1 (Note: Note Jin Air operates ICN-BKK as LJ1/2 in the Summer months (Mar-Oct) and as LJ3/4 in the winter months)	(South Korea) Seoul–Incheon	(Thailand) Bangkok–Suvarnabhumi		Boeing 737-800
LATAM Chile	LA1	LAN1	(Chile) Santiago	(Chile) Puerto Natales		Airbus A320
LOT Polish Airlines	LO1	LOT1	(Poland) Warsaw	(United States) Chicago–O'Hare		Boeing 787-8
Lufthansa	LH1	DLH1	(Germany) Hamburg	(Germany) Frankfurt		Airbus A321 / A320neo
Malaysia Airlines	MH1	MAS1	(United Kingdom) London–Heathrow	(Malaysia) Kuala Lumpur		Airbus A350-900
Nauru Airlines	ON1	RON1	Nauru	(Australia) Brisbane		Boeing 737-300
Qantas	QF1	QFA1	(Australia) Sydney	Singapore	(United Kingdom) London–Heathrow	Airbus A380-800
Qatar Airways	QR1	QTR1	(Qatar) Doha	(United Kingdom) London–Heathrow		Boeing 777-200LR / 777-300ER / Airbus A350-900
Royal Brunei Airlines	BI1	RBA1	(Brunei) Bandar Seri Begawan	(Saudi Arabia) Jeddah		Boeing 787-8
Scandinavian Airlines	SK1	SAS1	(Sweden) Lulea	(Sweden) Stockholm		Airbus A320neo
Skymark Airlines	BC1	SKY1	(Japan) Tokyo–Haneda	(Japan) Fukuoka		Boeing 737-800
Southwest Airlines	WN1	SWA1	(United States) Dallas–Love Field	(United States) Houston–Hobby	(United States) Corpus Christi	Boeing 737-700 / 737-800 / 737-MAX 8
SpiceJet	SG1	SEJ1	(India) Chennai	(Sri Lanka) Colombo		Boeing 737-800
Spirit Airlines	NK1	NKS1	(United States) Fort Lauderdale	(United States) Chicago–O'Hare		Airbus A321 / Airbus A321neo
Spring Japan	IJ1	SJO1	(Japan) Tokyo-Narita	(China) Shanghai-Pudong		Boeing 737-800
Starlux Airlines	JX1	SJX1	(United States) Los Angeles	(Taiwan) Taipei–Taoyuan		Airbus A350-900
Turkish Airlines	TK1	THY1	(Turkey) Istanbul	(United States) New York–JFK		Boeing 777-300ER
United Airlines	UA1	UAL1	(United States) San Francisco	Singapore		Boeing 787-9
WestJet	WS1	WJA1	(United Kingdom) London–Heathrow	(Canada) Calgary		Boeing 787-9
Zipair Tokyo	ZG1	TZP1	(United States) Honolulu	(Japan) Tokyo–Narita		Boeing 787-8

A notable former flight number 1 was British Airways flight BA1, operated by the Concorde between London Heathrow and New York's John F. Kennedy airport. After the retirement of Concorde in 2003, the flight number was retired with it, but in 2009 it was given to the all business class A318 flight between London City Airport and New York JFK via Shannon in Ireland. This route ceased operation in 2020 due to the COVID-19 pandemic, and British Airways has since announced it will not be restarting the service.

== Flight number changes ==
Flight numbers are often taken out of use after a crash or a serious incident. Examples include:

- Following the disappearance of Malaysia Airlines Flight 370, the airline changed the flight number for subsequent flights following the same route to MH 318.
- After the crash of Air France Flight 447 over the Atlantic Ocean, a regular scheduled flight from Rio de Janeiro to Paris, the flight number was changed to AF 445.
- Following the crash of Asiana Airlines Flight 214 in July 2013, Asiana change the numbered flight pairs from Asiana Airlines 213/214 to 211/212.
- Following the crash of Air India Flight 171 in Ahmedabad in June 2025, Air India changed the Ahmedabad to London Gatwick flight number to AI 159.

Sometimes, airlines change their flight numbers when the routes are changed. For example, United flights UA 801 and UA 802 were renumbered as UA 820 (LAX-HKG-BKK) and UA 821 (BKK-HKG-LAX) when the flights were extended. United Flights UA 153 (HKG-LAX) and UA 152 (LAX-HKG), however, retained the original flight numbers when the additional segment to/from SGN (Ho Chi Minh City, Vietnam) was added.

== Flight number conservation ==
Airline "mega-mergers", in markets such as the United States, have made it necessary to break conventional flight numbering schemes. Organizations such as IATA, ICAO, ARC, as well as CRS systems and the FAA's ATC systems limit flight numbers to four digits (0001 to 9999). The pool of available flight numbers has been outstripped by demand for them by emergent mega-carriers. As such, some carriers use the same flight number for back-and-forth flights (e.g., DCA-PBI-DCA), or in other cases carriers have assigned a single flight number to a multi-leg flight (e.g., ICT-DAL-HOU-MDW-OMA-DEN-ABQ-LAS-BDL).

== Flight designator ==
Although 'flight number' is the term used colloquially, the official term as defined in the Standard Schedules Information Manual (SSIM) published annually by the International Air Transport Association (IATA) Schedules Information Standards Committee (SISC), is flight designator. Officially the term 'flight number' refers to the numeric part (up to four digits) of a flight code. For example, in the flight codes QF103 and AF296Q, "103" and "296" are flight numbers. Even within the airline and airport industry, it is common to use the colloquial term rather than the official term.

== Spacecraft ==
Flight numbers are also sometimes used for spacecraft, though a flight number for an expendable rocket (such as Ariane 5 Flight 501) might more reasonably be called the serial number of the vehicle used, since an expendable rocket can only be launched once. Space Shuttle missions used numbers with the STS prefix, for example, STS-93. SpaceX uses sequential numbers for flights of reused boosters. As an example, Crew-2 used booster B1061.2 (the second flight of booster B1061).

== See also ==
- Airline call sign
- Codeshare agreement
- Change of gauge (aviation)
