= List of first satellites by country =

First artificial satellites launched by country or territory

As of 10 September 2026, over eighty countries have operated artificial satellites.

| Denotes international organisations |
| Denotes countries formerly part of another country which already had a spacecraft in orbit |
| Denotes countries with disputed sovereignty or recognition and autonomous dependent territories |

| Country | Satellite | Operator | Manufacturer | Carrier rocket | Launch site | Date (UTC) | Remarks |
|---|---|---|---|---|---|---|---|
| Soviet Union | Sputnik 1 | OKB-1 | (Soviet Union) OKB-1 | (Soviet Union) Sputnik 8K71PS | (Soviet Union) Baikonur | 4 October 1957 | First satellite launched |
| United States | Explorer 1 | ABMA | (United States) JPL | (United States) Juno I RS-29 | (United States) Cape Canaveral | 1 February 1958 | |
| United Kingdom | Ariel 1 | RAE | (United States) NASA / (United Kingdom) SERC | (United States) Thor DM-19 Delta | (United States) Cape Canaveral | 26 April 1962 | |
| Canada | Alouette 1 | DRDC | (Canada) DRDC | (United States) Thor DM-21 Agena-B | (United States) Vandenberg | 29 September 1962 | |
| Italy | San Marco 1 | CNR | (Italy) CRA | (United States) Scout X-4 | (United States) Wallops | 15 December 1964 | |
| France | Astérix | CNES | (France) CNES | (France) Diamant A | (Algeria) Hammaguir | 26 November 1965 | |
| Australia | WRESAT | WRE | (Australia) WRE | (United States) Sparta | (Australia) Woomera | 29 November 1967 | |
| 10 European countries: Belgium; Denmark; France; Germany; Italy; Netherlands; Spain; Sweden; Switzerland; United Kingdom | ESRO 2B | ESRO | (United Kingdom) Hawker Siddeley | (United States) Scout B | (United States) Vandenberg | 17 May 1968 | |
| West Germany | Azur | DLR | (Germany) DLR / (United States) NASA | (United States) Scout B | (United States) Vandenberg | 8 November 1969 | |
| Japan | Ohsumi | ISAS | (Japan) ISAS | (Japan) Lambda-4S | (Japan) Kagoshima | 11 February 1970 | |
| China | Dongfanghong I | CAST | (China) CAST | (China) Chang Zheng 1 | (China) Jiuquan | 24 April 1970 | |
| Netherlands | ANS | SRON / NASA | (Netherlands) Philips | (United States) Scout D-1 | (United States) Vandenberg | 30 August 1974 | |
| Spain | Intasat | INTA | (Spain) Standard Electrica | (United States) Delta 2310 | (United States) Vandenberg | 15 November 1974 | |
| India | Aryabhata | ISRO | (India) ISRO | (Soviet Union) Kosmos-3M | (Soviet Union) Kapustin Yar | 19 April 1975 | |
| Indonesia | Palapa A1 | Perumtel | (United States) Hughes | (United States) Delta 2914 | (United States) Cape Canaveral | 8 July 1976 | |
| Czechoslovakia | Magion 1 | IAP | (Czechoslovakia) IG | (Soviet Union) Kosmos-3M | (Soviet Union) Plesetsk | 24 October 1978 | |
| Bulgaria | Bulgaria 1300 | BSA | (Bulgaria) Bulgarian Academy of Sciences | (Soviet Union) Vostok-2M | (Soviet Union) Plesetsk | 7 August 1981 | |
| Saudi Arabia | Arabsat-1A | Arabsat | (France) Aérospatiale | Ariane 3 | (France) Kourou | 8 February 1985 | |
| Brazil | Brasilsat A1 | Embratel | (United States) Hughes | Ariane 3 | (France) Kourou | 8 February 1985 | |
| Mexico | Morelos 1 | SCT | (United States) Hughes | (United States) Space Shuttle Discovery | (United States) Kennedy | 17 June 1985 | Deployed using PAM-D during STS-51-G |
| Sweden | Viking | SSC | (United States) Boeing/ (Sweden) Saab | Ariane 1 | (France) Kourou | 22 February 1986 | |
| Israel | Ofek-1 | | (Israel) IAI | (Israel) Shavit | (Israel) Palmachim | 19 September 1988 | |
| Luxembourg | Astra 1A | SES Astra | (United States) GE Astrospace | Ariane 44LP | (France) Kourou | 11 December 1988 | |
| Argentina | Lusat | AMSAT Argentina | | Ariane 40 | (France) Kourou | 22 January 1990 | |
| Hong Kong | AsiaSat 1 | AsiaSat | (United States) Hughes | (China) Chang Zheng 3 | (China) Xichang | 7 April 1990 | Hong Kong, a British Overseas Territory, became part of the People's Republic of China in July 1997 |
| Pakistan | Badr-1 | SUPARCO | (Pakistan) SUPARCO | (China) Chang Zheng 2E | (China) Xichang | 16 July 1990 | |
| Russia | Kosmos 2175 | | (Russia) | (Russia) Soyuz-U | (Russia) Plesetsk | 21 January 1992 | Successor state to the Soviet Union |
| South Korea | Kitsat-1 | KAIST | (United Kingdom) SSTL | Ariane 42P | (France) Kourou | 10 August 1992 | |
| Portugal | PoSAT-1 | PoSAT | (United Kingdom) SSTL | Ariane 40 | (France) Kourou | 26 September 1993 | |
| Thailand | Thaicom-1 | Shin Satellite | (United States) Hughes | Ariane 44L | (France) Kourou | 18 December 1993 | |
| Turkey | Turksat 1B | Türksat | (France) Aérospatiale | Ariane 44LP | (France) Kourou | 10 August 1994 | |
| Czech Republic | Magion 4 | IAP | (Czech Republic) IAP | (Russia) Molniya-M | (Russia) Plesetsk | 2 August 1995 | Formerly part of Czechoslovakia |
| Ukraine | Sich-1 | | | (Ukraine) Tsyklon-3 | (Russia) Plesetsk | 31 August 1995 | Formerly part of the Soviet Union |
| Chile | FASat-Alfa | | (United Kingdom) SSTL | (Ukraine) Tsyklon-3 | (Russia) Plesetsk | 31 August 1995 | Failed to separate |
| Malaysia | MEASAT-1 | MEASAT | (United States) Hughes | Ariane 44L | (France) Kourou | 13 January 1996 | |
| Norway | Thor 2 | Telenor | (United States) Hughes | (United States) Delta II 7925 | (United States) Cape Canaveral | 20 May 1997 | |
| Philippines | Mabuhay (Agila 1) (former Palapa B2P) | Mabuhay | | (United States) Delta-3920 | (United States) Cape Canaveral | 20 March 1987 | Originally operated and launched for Indonesian company PT Pasifik Satelit Nusantara. Acquired while on orbit by Mabuhay in 1996 making it the first Philippine owned satellite. |
| Philippines | Mabuhay 1 (Agila 2) | Mabuhay | (United States) SS/Loral | (China) Chang Zheng 3B | (China) Xichang | 19 August 1997 | First Philippine satellite to be launched from space |
| Egypt | Nilesat 101 | Nilesat | Astrium | Ariane 44P | (France) Kourou | 28 April 1998 | |
| Singapore; Taiwan | ST-1 | SingTel; Chunghwa | Astrium | Ariane 44P | (France) Kourou | 25 August 1998 | |
| Taiwan | Formosat-1 | NSPO | (United States) TRW | (United States) Athena I | (United States) Cape Canaveral | 27 January 1999 | |
| South Africa | SUNSAT | Stellenbosch | (South Africa) Stellenbosch | (United States) Delta II 7920 | (United States) Vandenberg | 23 February 1999 | Launched on same rocket as first Danish satellite |
| Denmark | Ørsted | DMI | (Denmark) CRI | (United States) Delta II 7920 | (United States) Vandenberg | 23 February 1999 | Launched on same rocket as first South African satellite |
| (Georgia (country)) Georgia | Reflektor | Energia-GPI Space | (Georgia (country)) (Russia) Energia-GPI Space | (Russia) Soyuz-U | (Kazakhstan) Baikonur Site 1/5 | 17 July 1999 | Formerly part of the Soviet Union |
| United Arab Emirates | Thuraya 1 | Thuraya | (United States) Boeing | (Ukraine) Zenit-3SL | (United Nations) Odyssey | 21 October 2000 | |
| Belgium | PROBA-1 | ESA | (Belgium) Verhaert Space | (India) Polar Satellite Launch Vehicle | (India) Satish Dhawan | 22 October 2001 | |
| Morocco | Maroc-Tubsat | | (Germany) TU Berlin | (Ukraine) Zenit-2 | (Kazakhstan) Baikonur | 10 December 2001 | |
| Tonga | Esiafi 1 (formerly Comstar D4) | TONGASAT | (United States) SS/Loral | (United States) Atlas SLV-3D Centaur-D1AR | (United States) Cape Canaveral | 21 February 1981 | A private American satellite that transferred ownership to Tonga in April 2002 |
| Algeria | AlSAT-1 | | (United Kingdom) SSTL | (Russia) Kosmos-3M | (Russia) Plesetsk | 28 November 2002 | |
| Greece | Hellas-Sat 2 | Hellas-Sat | Astrium | (United States) Atlas V 401 | (United States) Cape Canaveral | 13 May 2003 | |
| Nigeria | NigeriaSat-1 | | (United Kingdom) SSTL | (Russia) Kosmos-3M | (Russia) Plesetsk | 27 September 2003 | |
| Iran | Sina-1 | | (Russia) NPO Polyot | (Russia) Kosmos-3M | (Russia) Plesetsk | 27 October 2005 | |
| Kazakhstan | KazSat-1 | | (Russia) Khrunichev | (Russia) Proton-M/DM3 | (Kazakhstan) Baikonur | 17 June 2006 | Formerly part of the Soviet Union |
| Colombia | Libertad-1 | | (United States) (Colombia) | (Ukraine) Dnepr | (Kazakhstan) Baikonur | 17 April 2007 | |
| Mauritius | Rascom-QAF 1 | Rascom | (France) Alcatel | Ariane 5GS | (France) Kourou | 21 December 2007 | |
| Vietnam | Vinasat-1 | Vietnam Posts and Telecommunications Group | (United States) Lockheed Martin | Ariane 5ECA | (France) Kourou | 18 April 2008 | |
| Venezuela | Venesat-1 | | (China) CAST | (China) Chang Zheng 3B/E | (China) Xichang | 29 October 2008 | |
| Afghanistan | Eutelsat 48D / Afghansat 1 | Afghanistan Ministry of Communications and Information | EADS Astrium | (France) Ariane 5ECA | (France) Kourou | 20 December 2008 | Satellite leased to the Afghanistan Ministry of Communications and Information in January 2014 |
| Switzerland | SwissCube-1 | | (Switzerland) | (India) PSLV-CA | (India) Satish Dhawan | 23 September 2009 | |
| Singapore | X-Sat | | (South Korea) SATREC | (India) PSLV-C | (India) Satish Dhawan | 20 April 2011 | |
| Isle of Man | ViaSat-1 | ViaSat-IOM, ManSat, Telesat-IOM | (United States) SS/Loral | (Russia) Proton-M/Briz-M | (Kazakhstan) Baikonur | 19 October 2011 | Isle of Man is a Crown Dependency of the British sovereign |
| Hungary | MaSat-1 | | (Hungary) BME | Vega | (France) Kourou | 13 February 2012 | |
| Poland | PW-Sat | Warsaw University of Technology, Space Research Centre | | Vega | (France) Kourou | 13 February 2012 | Deorbit on 28 October 2014 |
| Romania | Goliat | | (United States) (Romania) | Vega | (France) Kourou | 13 February 2012 | |
| Belarus | BelKA-2 | | (Russia) | (Russia) Soyuz-FG/Fregat | (Kazakhstan) Baikonur | 22 July 2012 | |
| North Korea | Kwangmyŏngsŏng-3 Unit 2 | KCST | (North Korea) | (North Korea) Unha-3 | (North Korea) Sohae | 12 December 2012 | Failed to operate in orbit |
| Azerbaijan | Azerspace-1/Africasat-1a | Space Agency of the Republic of Azerbaijan (Azercosmos) | (United States) Orbital Sciences | Ariane 5ECA | (France) Kourou | 7 February 2013 | Independent since 1991 |
| Austria | TUGSAT-1/UniBRITE | | (Canada) UTAIS | (India) PSLV-CA | (India) Satish Dhawan | 25 February 2013 | Austria's first two satellites were launched together |
| Bermuda | Bermudasat 1 (former EchoStar VI) | Bermudasat | (United States) SS/Loral | (United States) Atlas IIAS | (United States) Cape Canaveral | 14 July 2000 | Bermuda is a British Overseas Territory; Bermudasat 1 (former private American EchoStar VI) satellite was transferred in April 2013 to Bermuda being at orbit |
| Ecuador | NEE-01 Pegaso | EXA | (Ecuador) EXA | (China) Chang Zheng 2D | (China) Jiuquan | 26 April 2013 | |
| Estonia | ESTCube-1 | | (Estonia) | Vega | (France) Kourou | 7 May 2013 | Estonia was formerly part of the Soviet Union. |
| Jersey | O3b-1/O3b-2/O3b-3/O3b-4 | O3b Networks | (France) Thales Alenia Space | (Russia) Soyuz-STB/Fregat-MT | (France) Kourou | 25 June 2013 | Jersey's first four satellites were launched together. Jersey is a Crown Dependency of the British sovereign |
| France; Qatar | Eutelsat 25B / Es'hail 1 | Eutelsat; Es'hailSat | (United States) SS/Loral | Ariane 5ECA | (France) Kourou | 29 August 2013 | Qatar's first satellite flew as a joint project with the French corporation Eutelsat |
| Qatar | Es'hail 1 | Es'hailSat | (United States) SS/Loral | Ariane 5ECA | (France) Kourou | 29 August 2013 | Full ownership of the joint France-Qatar satellite Eutelsat 25B / Es'hail 1 was sold to Es'hailsat in 2018 |
| Peru | PUCP-Sat 1 | | (Peru) | (Ukraine) Dnepr | (Russia) Dombarovsky | 21 November 2013 | |
| Peru | Pocket-PUCP | | (Peru) | (Ukraine) Dnepr | (Russia) Dombarovsky | 21 November 2013 | |
| Bolivia | Túpac Katari 1 | | (China) CAST | (China) Chang Zheng 3B/E | (China) Xichang | 20 December 2013 | |
| Lithuania | LitSat-1/Lituanica SAT-1 | | (Lithuania) | (United States) Antares 120 | (United States) MARS LP-0A | 9 January 2014 | The first two Lithuanian satellites were launched together; both carried to the International Space Station and deployed later in the year. Lithuania was formerly part of the Soviet Union. |
| Iraq | Tigrisat | MOST / La Sapienza | (Italy) La Sapienza | (Russia) Dnepr | (Russia) Dombarovsky | 19 June 2014 | |
| Uruguay | ANTELSAT | ANTEL | (Uruguay) UdelaR | (Russia) Dnepr | (Russia) Dombarovsky | 19 June 2014 | |
| Turkmenistan | TurkmenAlem52E/MonacoSAT | TNSA | (France) Alcatel | (United States) Falcon 9 | (United States) Cape Canaveral | 27 April 2015 | Formerly part of the Soviet Union. |
| Laos | Laosat-1 | Laos National Authority for Science and Technology | (China) CAST | (China) Chang Zheng 3B/E | (China) Xichang | 20 November 2015 | |
| Finland | Aalto-2 | Aalto University | (Finland) Aalto University | (United States) Atlas V 401 | (United States) Cape Canaveral | 18 April 2017 | |
| Bangladesh | BRAC ONNESHA | BRACU | (Japan) Kyushu Institute of Technology | (United States) Falcon 9 Full Thrust | (United States) Kennedy | 3 June 2017 | Launched on same rocket as first Ghanaian and Mongolian satellites |
| Ghana | GhanaSat-1 | All Nations University | (Japan) Kyushu Institute of Technology | (United States) Falcon 9 Full Thrust | (United States) Kennedy | 3 June 2017 | Launched on same rocket as first Bangladeshi and Mongolian satellites |
| Mongolia | Mazaalai (satellite) | National University of Mongolia | (Japan) Kyushu Institute of Technology | (United States) Falcon 9 Full Thrust | (United States) Kennedy | 3 June 2017 | Launched on same rocket as first Ghanaian and Bangladeshi satellites |
| Latvia | Venta 1 | Ventspils University College | (Latvia) Ventspils University College | (India) PSLV-CA | (India) Satish Dhawan | 23 June 2017 | Formerly part of the Soviet Union, Launched on same rocket as first Slovakian satellite |
| Slovakia | skCUBE | SOSA | (Slovakia) SOSA | (India) PSLV-CA | (India) Satish Dhawan | 23 June 2017 | Formerly part of Czechoslovakia, Launched on same rocket as first Latvian satellite |
| Angola | AngoSat 1 | AngoSat | (Russia) RSC Energia | (Ukraine) Zenit-3F / Fregat-SB | (Kazakhstan) Baikonur | 26 December 2017 | Launch was successful but contact was lost quickly afterwards. On 28 December 2017, communication was restored and telemetry was received. |
| New Zealand | Humanity Star | Rocket Lab | (United States) Rocket Lab | (New Zealand) Electron | (New Zealand) Rocket Lab Launch Complex 1 | 21 January 2018 | First satellite launched by New Zealand launcher. |
| Costa Rica | Proyecto Irazú | Costa Rica Institute of Technology | Costa Rica Institute of Technology | (United States) Falcon 9 | (United States) Cape Canaveral | 2 April 2018 | First satellite of Central America. Manufactured in Costa Rica. |
| Kenya | 1KUNS-PF | University of Nairobi | University of Nairobi (Kenya) | (United States) Falcon 9 | (United States) Cape Canaveral | 2 April 2018 | Launched on same rocket as first Costa Rican satellite. |
| Bhutan | Bhutan 1 | Bhutanese students under Kyutech-led second Joint Global Multination Birds Project (Birds-2) | (Japan) Kyushu Institute of Technology | (United States) Falcon 9 Full Thrust | (United States) Cape Canaveral | 29 June 2018 | |
| Jordan | JY1-SAT | Jordanian students under the Crown Prince Foundation | | (United States) Falcon 9 Full Thrust | (United States) Vandenberg | 3 December 2018 | |
| Nepal | NepaliSat-1 | NAST for Nepal Academy of Science and Technology | (Japan) Kyushu Institute of Technology | (United States) Antares 230 | (United States) MARS LP0A | 17 April 2019 | |
| Sri Lanka | Raavana 1 | Arthur C. Clarke Institute for Modern Technologies | (Japan) Kyushu Institute of Technology | (United States) Antares 230 | (United States) MARS LP0A | 17 April 2019 | |
| Rwanda | RWASAT-1 | Rwanda Utilities Regulatory Authority | Rwandan engineers with support from the (Japan) University of Tokyo | (Japan) H-IIB | (Japan) Tanegashima Space Center Yoshinobu Launch Complex | 24 September 2019 | Decay from orbit 27 April 2022 |
| Sudan | Sudan Remote Sensing Satellite 1 (SRSS-1) | Sudan | ISRA | (China) Long March 4B | (China) Taiyuan Satellite Launch Centre LC-9 | 3 November 2019 | |
| Ethiopia | Ethiopian Remote Sensing Satellite 1 (ETRSS-1) | Ethiopia | Ethiopia Ethiopian Space Science and Technology Institute | (China) Long March 4B | (China) Taiyuan Satellite Launch Centre | 20 December 2019 | |
| Guatemala | Quetzal-1 | Universidad del Valle de Guatemala | Guatemala Students from the Universidad del Valle de Guatemala | (United States) Falcon 9 | (United States) Cape Canaveral SLC-40 | 7 March 2020 | |
| Slovenia | TriSat | University of Maribor | University of Maribor | Vega | (France) Kourou | 3 September 2020 | Launched on same rocket as first Monégasque satellite. |
| Slovenia | Nemo HD | Space-SI | UTIAS / Space-SI | Vega | (France) Kourou | 3 September 2020 | Launched on same rocket as first Monégasque satellite. |
| Monaco | OSM-1 Cicero | Orbital Solutions Monaco | Orbital Solutions Monaco | Vega | (France) Kourou | 3 September 2020 | Launched on same rocket as first two Slovenian satellites. |
| Paraguay | GuaraniSat-1 | Paraguayan Space Agency and Kyutech-led fourth Joint Global Multination Birds Project | (Japan) Kyushu Institute of Technology | (United States) Antares 230 | (United States) MARS LP0A | 20 February 2021 | Launched on same rocket as first Myanma satellite. |
| Myanmar | Lawkanat-1 | Myanmar Aerospace Engineering University | (Japan) Hokkaido University / Myanmar Aerospace Engineering University | (United States) Antares 230 | (United States) MARS LP0A | 20 February 2021 | Launched on same rocket as first Paraguayan satellite. |
| Tunisia | Challenge-1 | Telnet Tunisie | Telnet Tunisie | (Russia) Soyuz-2.1a / Fregat | (Kazakhstan) Baikonur Site 31/6 | 22 March 2021 | |
| Kuwait | QMR-KWT | Orbital Space Kuwait | Orbital Space Kuwait | (United States) Falcon 9 | (United States) CCSFS SLC-40 | 30 June 2021 | |
| Bahrain; United Arab Emirates | Light-1 | New York University Abu Dhabi | Engineers from Bahrain's space agency, NSSA, in collaboration with (United Arab Emirates) Khalifa University | (United States) Falcon 9 | (United States) CCSFS | 21 December 2021 | Bahrain's first satellite flew as a joint project with the UAE Space Agency |
| Armenia; Spain | ARMSAT_1 | Satlantis / Geocosmos | Satlantis | (United States) Falcon 9 | (United States) Cape Canaveral SLC-40 | 25 May 2022 | Joint satellite between Satlantis and Geocosmos |
| Moldova | TUMnanoSAT | Technical University of Moldova | Technical University of Moldova | (United States) Falcon 9 | (United States) Kennedy LC-39A | 15 July 2022 | Formerly part of the Soviet Union |
| Uganda | PearlAfricaSat-1 | Ministry of Science, Technology and Innovation | Kyushu Institute of Technology | (United States) Antares | (United States) MARS LP-0A | 7 November 2022 | Launched on the same rocket as the first Zimbabwean satellite |
| Zimbabwe | ZIMSAT-1 | Zimbabwe National Geospatial and Space Agency | Kyushu Institute of Technology | (United States) Antares | (United States) MARS LP-0A | 7 November 2022 | Launched on the same rocket as the first Ugandan satellite |
| Albania | Albania-1 | State Authority for Geospatial Information | (Argentina) Satellogic | (United States) Falcon 9 | (United States) Cape Canaveral SLC-40 | 3 January 2023 | First Albanian satellites, launched as a pair |
| Albania | Albania-2 | State Authority for Geospatial Information | (Argentina) Satellogic | (United States) Falcon 9 | (United States) Cape Canaveral SLC-40 | 3 January 2023 | First Albanian satellites, launched as a pair |
| Macau | Macao Science-1A | Macau University of Science and Technology | Macau University of Science and Technology | (China) Long March 2C | (China) Jiuquan LA-4 | 21 May 2023 | First Macanese satellites, launched as a pair |
| Macau | Macao Science-1B | Macau University of Science and Technology | Macau University of Science and Technology | (China) Long March 2C | (China) Jiuquan LA-4 | 21 May 2023 | First Macanese satellites, launched as a pair |
| Vatican City; Italy | SpeiSat | Dicastery for Communication/ASI | (Italy) ASI | (United States) Falcon 9 | (United States) Vandenberg SLC-4E | 12 June 2023 | Joint satellite between the Italian Space Agency and the Vatican Dicastery for Communication |
| Oman | AMAN-1 | ETCO | (Poland) SatRev | (United States) Falcon 9 | (United States) Vandenberg SLC-4E | 11 November 2023 | Launched on the same rocket as the first Djiboutian satellite |
| Djibouti | Djibouti-1A | University of Djibouti | (France) University of Montpellier | (United States) Falcon 9 | (United States) Vandenberg SLC-4E | 11 November 2023 | Launched on the same rocket as the first Omani satellite |
| Armenia | Hayasat-1 | Bazoomq Space Research Laboratory | (Armenia) Bazoomq Space Research Laboratory, Center of Scientific Innovation and Education | (United States) Falcon 9 | (United States) Vandenberg SLC-4E | 1 December 2023 | Formerly part of the Soviet Union. Launched on the same rocket as the first Irish satellite |
| Ireland | EIRSAT-1 | University College Dublin | (Republic of Ireland) University College Dublin | (United States) Falcon 9 | (United States) Vandenberg SLC-4E | 1 December 2023 | Launched on the same rocket as the first Armenian satellite |
| Senegal | GAINDESAT-1A | SenSat | (France) University of Montpellier | (United States) Falcon 9 | (United States) Vandenberg SLC-4E | 16 August 2024 | |
| Croatia | CroCube | Društvo EVO | (Croatia) EVO / (Czech Republic) Spacemanic | (United States) Falcon 9 | (United States) Vandenberg SLC-4E | 21 December 2024 | |
| Botswana | BOTSAT-1 | Botswana International University of Science and Technology | EnduroSat | (United States) Falcon 9 | (United States) Vandenberg SLC-4E | 15 March 2025 | |
| Montenegro | Luča | Montenegro Space Research | AIVT by Sputnix | (Russia) Soyuz-2.1b / Fregat-M | (Russia) Vostochny Site 1S | 28 December 2025 | |

== Suborbital only ==
In addition, some countries have only attained a suborbital spaceflight, and have yet to launch a satellite into orbit.

| Country | Payload | Carrier rocket | Launch site | Date (UTC) |
|---|---|---|---|---|
| Lebanon | ARZ-3 | (Lebanon) Cedar-3 | (Lebanon) Dbayeh | 21 November 1962 |
| Yemen | Warhead | (Yemen) Burkan-2 | (Yemen) Sa'dah | 4 November 2017 |
| Sealand | Postcard | (United States) New Shepard | (United States) Corn Ranch, Launch Site One | 13 October 2020 13:36 |
| British Antarctic Territory | Postcard | (United States) New Shepard | (United States) Corn Ranch, Launch Site One | 14 January 2021 16:57 |

== See also ==
- Timeline of first orbital launches by country
- Timeline of spaceflight
