= Dual segmented Langmuir probe =

Spacecraft-borne scientific instrument

Dual Segmented Langmuir Probe (DSLP)
- Operator: European Space Agency
- Manufacturer: (Czech Republic) Astronomical Institute of CAS, Institute of Atmospheric Physics of CAS
- Instrument type: Langmuir probe
- Function: Plasma research
- Website: terezka.asu.cas.cz/proba2

Host spacecraft
- Spacecraft: Proba-2
- Operator: ESA
- Launch date: 2 November, 01:50:51 UTC
- Rocket: Rokot/Briz-KM
- Launch site: Plesetsk 133/3
- COSPAR ID: 2009-059B
- Orbit: Low Earth

Dual Segmented Langmuir Probe (DSLP) is an instrument developed primarily by Czech researchers and engineers to study the magnetospheric background plasma flown on board the spacecraft of the European Space Agency (ESA) Proba 2.

Data acquired by DSLP will be used to reach these specific scientific goals:

- Directional Measurements: Contrary to classical Langmuir probes, the new DSLP concept of data acquisition from the independent segments will enable to study also plasma characteristics in different directions. This should provide for example estimations of plasma flow velocity. Typically in the presence of magnetic field, electron temperatures are observed to be slightly different in the direction parallel and perpendicular to the magnetic field lines. This temperature anisotropy should be measured with DSLP by way of directional data acquisition.
- Non-Maxwellian Features in Ionospheric Plasma: Classical theories for LPs are typically developed for plasmas in a thermodynamic equilibrium, that is for particle populations possessing Maxwellian velocity distribution functions. However, a thermodynamic equilibrium and thus a Maxwellian distribution is an idealized case while the real distribution in many plasma environments often exhibits various non-Maxwellian features, like loss-cone or flat-top distributions or high-energy tails. We intend to adapt the DSLP theoretical model in order to see whether such features exist also in ionospheric plasmas.
- Ionospheric Irregularities: Ionosphere especially in the equatorial region possess several phenomena such equatorial ionization anomaly or ionospheric perturbations in auroral and cusp regions. The latitudinal distribution of these anomalies should be mapped during the whole mission. The effects are also highly dependent on space weather, on magnetospheric forces induced by solar, interplanetary and magnetospheric disturbances. Hence also coordination with LYRA and SWAP (other Proba 2 payload) measurements would be useful to find a correlation between particular solar events and ionospheric disturbances.
- Ionospheric Perturbations by Solar Events (CMEs): This scientific objective will use cooperation with LYRA and SWAP experiments and further more enhance the sphere of interest. Detected solar event, if possible, should start DSLP burst measurement when the solar event affects the Earth.
- Mapping Bulk Plasma Parameters: All acquired DSLP data will be used to map the bulk plasma parameters (primarily electron density and temperature) and to study their latitude and seasonal variations.

The DSLP instrument consists of two Langmuir probes, electronics and a small data processing unit. DSLP shares some interface, power and processing resources with TPMU experiment. DSLP has been developed on the basis of its predecessor ISL (Instrument Sonde de Langmuir), flown on the Demeter mission of CNES.

DSLP was developed by the consortium of the Astronomical Institute and Institute of Atmospheric Physics of the Czech Academy of Sciences, the Research and Scientific Support Department (RSSD) of ESA, the Czech Space Research Centre (CSRC), and SPRINX Systems. The team has been led by the Principal Investigator Pavel Trávníček.
