= Technology Experiment Satellite =

Indian satellite

- Mission type: Earth Observation; Photo-reconnaissance
- Operator: NTRO
- COSPAR ID: 2001-049A
- SATCAT no.: 26957
- Website: ISRO: PSLV-C3
- Mission duration: 12 years, 2 months and 9 days

Spacecraft properties
- Manufacturer: ISRO; LPSC
- Launch mass: 1108 kg

Start of mission
- Launch date: 22 October 2001, 04:53:00 UTC
- Rocket: PSLV-C3
- Launch site: SHAR, First Launch Pad
- Contractor: ISRO

End of mission
- Last contact: 1 January 2014
- Decay date: 2025

Orbital parameters
- Reference system: Geocentric
- Regime: Sun-synchronous
- Perigee altitude: 551 km
- Apogee altitude: 579 km
- Inclination: 97.8°
- Period: 96.0 minutes
- Epoch: 22 October 2001

Instruments
- Panchromatic Camera

Technology Experiment Satellite (TES) was an Indian remote sensing and photo-reconnaissance satellite.

== Launch ==
Technology Experiment Satellite (TES) was launched by the PSLV-C3 rocket from the Satish Dhawan Space Centre at Sriharikota on the southeast coast of India at 04:53 UT on 22 October 2001. This was the fifth consecutive successful launch of the 294-tonne Polar Satellite Launch Vehicle rocket and the second launch to deploy multiple satellites. The 1,108 kg TES satellite carried a one-meter resolution panchromatic camera and was an experimental satellite designed to demonstrate and validate technologies in orbit that could be used in future satellites of the Indian Space Research Organisation (ISRO). TES was successfully placed in a 572 km Sun-synchronous orbit on 22 October 2001 using PSLV-C3. PSLV-C3 also deployed two additional satellites: PROBA, a Belgian satellite, and BIRD, a German satellite.

== Mission ==
The technologies demonstrated in TES are attitude and orbit control system, high torque reaction wheels, new reaction control system with optimised thrusters and a single propellant tank, light weight spacecraft structure, solid state recorder, X-band phased array antenna, improved satellite positioning system, miniaturised TTC and power system and, two-mirror-on-axis camera optics.

TES has a panchromatic camera for remote sensing. The camera is which is capable of producing images of one metre resolution. One metre resolution means the camera is able to distinguish between two objects which are separated at least a metre.

The launch of TES made India the second country in the world after the United States that can commercially offer images with one metre resolution. It is used for remote sensing of civilian areas, mapping industry and geographical information services. TES, helped the US Army with high-resolution images for counter-terrorism offensives against the Taliban forces in Afghanistan following the 9/11 attacks.

The retired satellite eventually decayed and re-entered Earth’s atmosphere in 2025.

== See also ==
- TDS-1
- Indian military satellites
- Polar Satellite Launch Vehicle
- List of Indian satellites
- Space based survelliance project
