= Swap =

Swap or SWAP may refer to:

== Finance ==
- Swap (finance), a derivative in which two parties agree to exchange one stream of cash flows against another
- Barter

== Science and technology ==
- Swap (computer programming), exchanging two variables in the memory of a computer
- Swap partition, a partition on a computer storage used for paging
- Swap file, a file on a computer storage used for paging
- SWAP (instrument) (Sun Watcher using Active Pixel System Detector and Image Processing), a space instrument aboard the PROBA2 satellite
- SWAP (New Horizons) (Solar Wind At Pluto), a science instrument aboard the uncrewed New Horizons space probe
- SWAP protein domain, in molecular biology
- Size, weight and power (SWaP), see DO-297

== Other ==
- Swåp, an Anglo-Swedish folk music band
- Sector-Wide Approach (SWAp), an approach to international development
- Swap (film), a 2015 Philippine crime drama film

== See also ==
- Swaps (horse) (1952–1972), a California-bred American Thoroughbred racehorse
- Swapping (disambiguation)
- The Swap
