= PSLV-C3 =

- Model of the PSLV rocket
- Mission type: Deployment of three satellites.
- Operator: ISRO
- Website: ISRO website
- Mission duration: 1,658 seconds
- Apogee: 586.7 kilometres (365 mi)

Spacecraft properties
- Spacecraft: Polar Satellite Launch Vehicle
- Spacecraft type: Expendable launch vehicle
- Manufacturer: ISRO
- Launch mass: 294,000 kilograms (648,000 lb)
- Payload mass: 1,294 kilograms (2,853 lb)
- Dimensions: 44.4 metres (146 ft) (overall height)

Start of mission
- Launch date: 10:23, October 22, 2001 (IST)
- Rocket: Polar Satellite Launch Vehicle
- Launch site: Sriharikota Launching Range
- Contractor: ISRO

End of mission
- Disposal: Placed in graveyard orbit
- Deactivated: October 22, 2001

Orbital parameters
- Reference system: Sun-synchronous
- Regime: Low Earth orbit

Payload
- TES; BIRD; PROBA
- Mass: 1,294 kilograms (2,853 lb)

PSLV-C3 was the third operational launch and overall sixth mission of the PSLV program. This launch was also the forty-sixth launch by Indian Space Research Organisation since its first mission on 1 January 1962. The vehicle carried three satellites which were deployed in the Sun-synchronous Low Earth orbit. The vehicle carried Technology Experiment Satellite (Indian experimental Earth observation satellite), BIRD (German Earth observation satellite) and PROBA (experimental satellite from Belgium). This was India's and ISRO's second commercial spaceflight. PSLV-C3 was launched at 10:23 a.m. IST on 22 October 2001 from Satish Dhawan Space Centre (then called "Sriharikota Range").

== Mission highlights ==
The mission involved placing Technology Experiment Satellite (TES) and Bispectral and Infrared Remote Detection (BIRD) in a 568 km circular orbit. It would then place the PRoject for On Board Autonomy (PROBA) satellite in an 568 km x 638 km elliptical orbit. This demonstrated ISRO capability to launch multiple satellites in multiple orbits. It also earned ISRO $1 million for each satellite.

== Mission parameters ==
- Mass:
  - Total liftoff weight: 294,000 kilograms (648,000 lb)
  - Payload weight: 1,294 kilograms (2,853 lb)
- Overall height: 44.4 metres (145.7 ft)
- Propellant:
  - First stage: Solid HTPB based (138.0 + 54 tonnes)
  - Second stage: Liquid UDMH + N_{2}O_{4} (40 tonnes)
  - Third stage: Solid HTPB based (7 tonnes)
  - Fourth stage: Liquid MMH + MON (2.0 tonnes)
- Engine:
  - First stage: S139
  - Second stage: Vikas
  - Third stage:
  - Fourth stage: 2 x PS-4
- Thrust:
  - First stage: 4,430 + 677 x 6 kN
  - Second stage: 724 kN
  - Third stage: 324 kN
  - Fourth stage: 7.4 x 2 kN
- Altitude: 586.7 kilometres (365 mi)
- Maximum velocity:7,593 metres per second (24,911 ft/s) (recorded at time of fourth stage ignition)
- Duration: 1,658 seconds

== Payload ==
PSLV-C3 carried and deployed total three satellites. Technology Experiment Satellite (TES) was the main payload and BIRD and PROBA were two auxiliary payloads that were mounted on PSLV-C3. In the flight sequence, TES was injected first, followed by BIRD and then PROBA.

Country	Name	Nos	Mass	Type	Objective
India	TES	1	1,108 kg	Satellite	Experimental Earth observation satellite
Belgium	BIRD	1	94 kg	Microsatellite	Remote sensing technology demonstration
Germany	PROBA	1	92 kg	Microsatellite	Earth observation technology demonstration

== Launch and planned flight profile ==
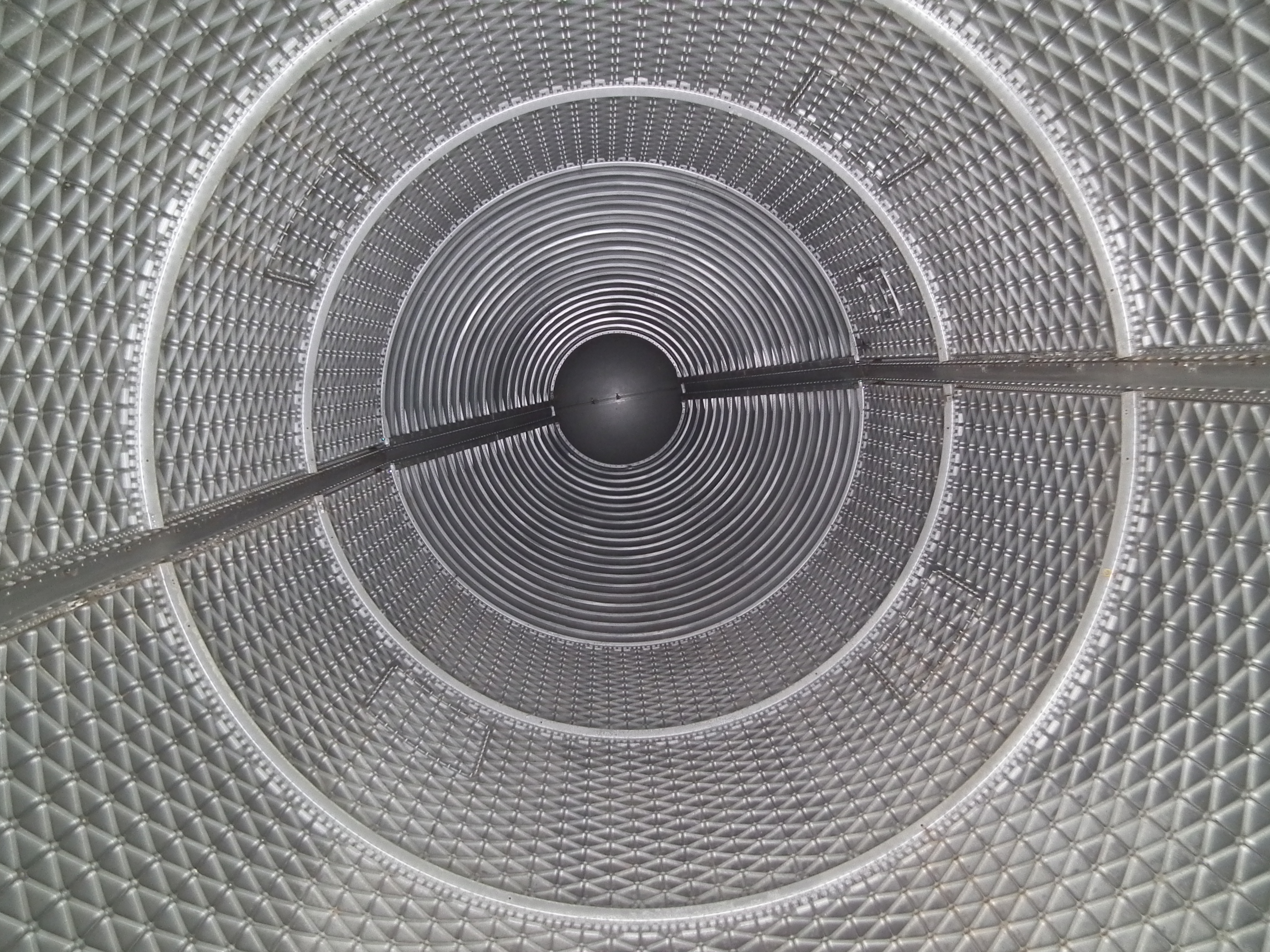
Heat shield of PSLV displayed at HAL heritage center.

PSLV-C3 was launched at 10:23 a.m. IST on 22 October 2001 from Satish Dhawan Space Centre (then called "Sriharikota Launching Range"). The mission was planned with pre-flight prediction of covering overall distance of 586.668 kilometres (365 mi). The total flight time was 1658 seconds as PROBA was to be launched into an elliptical orbit after TES and BIRD were launched into a circular orbit. The orbit raise was done using the yaw RCS thrusters in off-modulated mode.

Following was the planned flight profile.

Stage	Time (seconds)	Altitude (kilometer)	Velocity (meter/sec)	Event	Remarks
First stage	T+0	0.02	452	First stage ignition	Lift-off
First stage	T+1.24	0.02	452	Ignition of 4 ground-lit strap-on motors	
First stage	T+25.04	2.515	551	Ignition of 2 air-lit strap-on motors	
First stage	T+68.04	23.472	1,155	Separation of 4 ground-lit strap-on motors	
First stage	T+90.04	40.061	1,644	Separation of 2 air-lit strap-on motors	
First stage	T+112.73	67.601	2,028	First stage separation	
Second stage	T+112.93	67.828	2,027	Second stage ignition	
Second stage	T+156.73	115.604	2,284	Heat shield separation	
Second stage	T+278.81	236.272	4,099	Second stage separation	
Third stage	T+280.01	237.433	4,097	Third stage ignition	
Third stage	T+498.33	455.487	6,086	Third stage separation	
Fourth stage	T+520.60	460.818	6,065	Fourth stage ignition	
Fourth stage	T+914.92	571.247	7,575	Fourth stage thrust cut-off	
Fourth stage	T+971.92	572.080	7,575	TES separation	
Fourth stage	T+1,011.92	572.709	7,575	BIRD separation	
Fourth stage	T+1,091.92	574.064	7,575	PROBA orbit raise start	
Fourth stage	T+1,552.50	585.018	7,593	PROBA orbit raise stop	
Fourth stage	T+1,602.50	586.688	7,592	PROBA orbit separation	Mission over

== Fourth Stage Break-up event ==
The fourth stage of the PSLV had undergone a break-up event on 19 December 2001, likely caused by an explosion. After the explosion of PSLV-C3, ISRO carried out passivation of the upper stages of the PSLV, from the PSLV-C4 mission onwards. As per ISRO, this event generated 386 debris objects, of which 76 were in orbit in 2021, falling to 41 by 2025.

== See also ==
- Indian Space Research Organisation
- Polar Satellite Launch Vehicle
