= Sun sensor =

Spacecraft instrument that senses the direction to the Sun

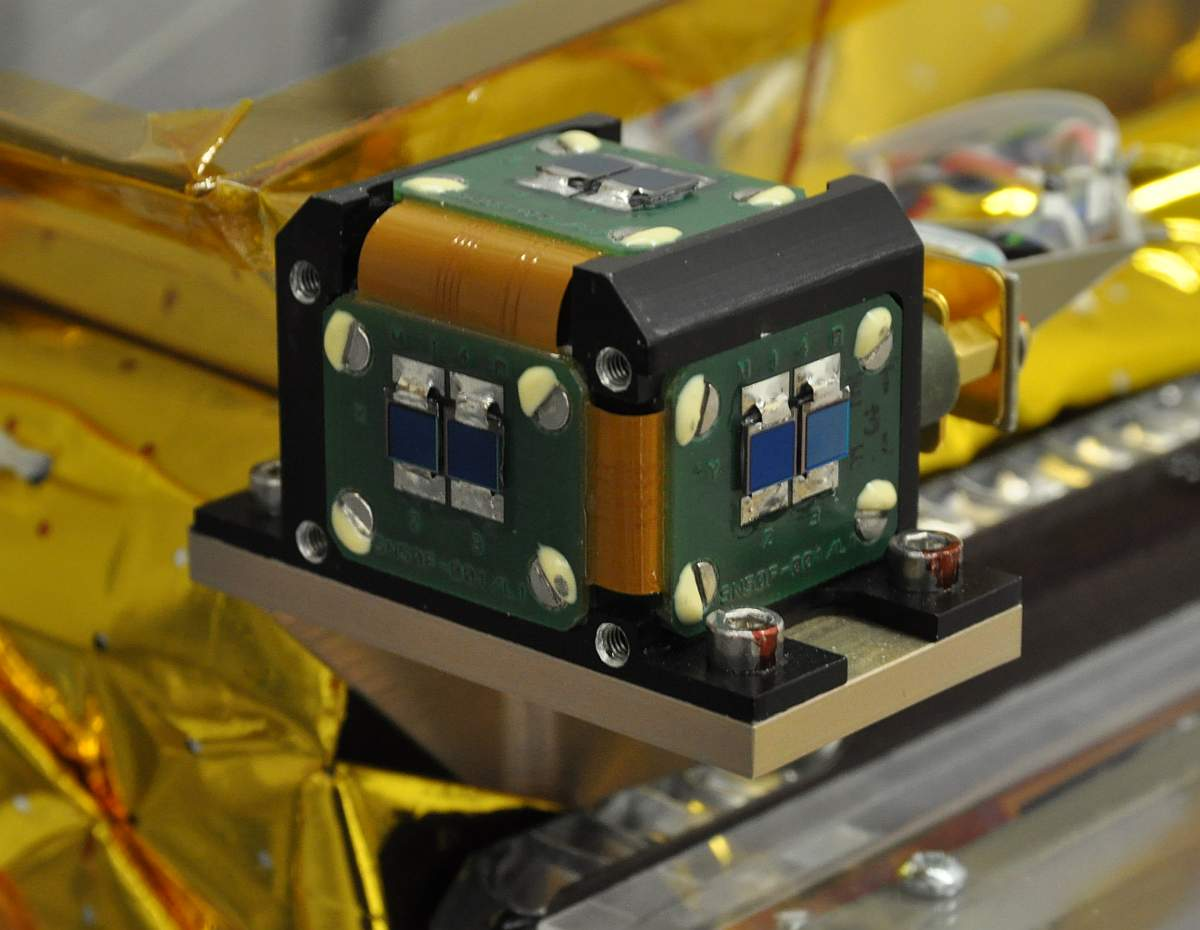
Non-linear Sun sensor used by the TET-1 German microsatellite.

A Sun sensor is a navigational instrument used by spacecraft to detect the position of the Sun. Sun sensors are used for attitude control, solar array pointing, gyro updating, and fail-safe recovery.

In addition to spacecraft, Sun sensors find use in ground-based weather stations and Sun-tracking systems, and aerial vehicles including balloons and UAVs.

== Mechanism ==
There are various types of Sun sensors, which differ in their technology and performance characteristics. Sun presence sensors provide a binary output, indicating when the Sun is within the sensor's field of view. Analog and digital Sun sensors, in contrast, indicate the angle of the Sun by continuous and discrete signal outputs, respectively.

In typical Sun sensors, a thin slit at the top of a rectangular chamber allows a line of light to fall on an array of photodetector cells at the bottom of the chamber. A voltage is induced in these cells, which is registered electronically. By orienting two sensors perpendicular to each other, the direction of the Sun can be fully determined.

Often, multiple sensors will share processing electronics.

== Criteria ==
There are a number of design and performance criteria which dictate the selection of a Sun sensor model:

- Field of view
- Angular resolution
- Accuracy and stability
- Mass and volume
- Input voltage and power
- Output characteristics (including electrical characteristics, update frequency, nonlinearity, and encoding)
- Durability (including radiation hardening and tolerance to vibration and thermal cycling)

== See also ==
- Celestial navigation
- Earth sensor
- Star tracker
