= Daniel Seaton =

Daniel Seaton may refer to:

- Daniel P. Seaton (1835–1918), doctor, African Methodist Episcopalian minister, and author
- Daniel B. Seaton (fl. 2008–2015), American solar physicist
