= Es'hail 2 =

Qatari television and radio satellite

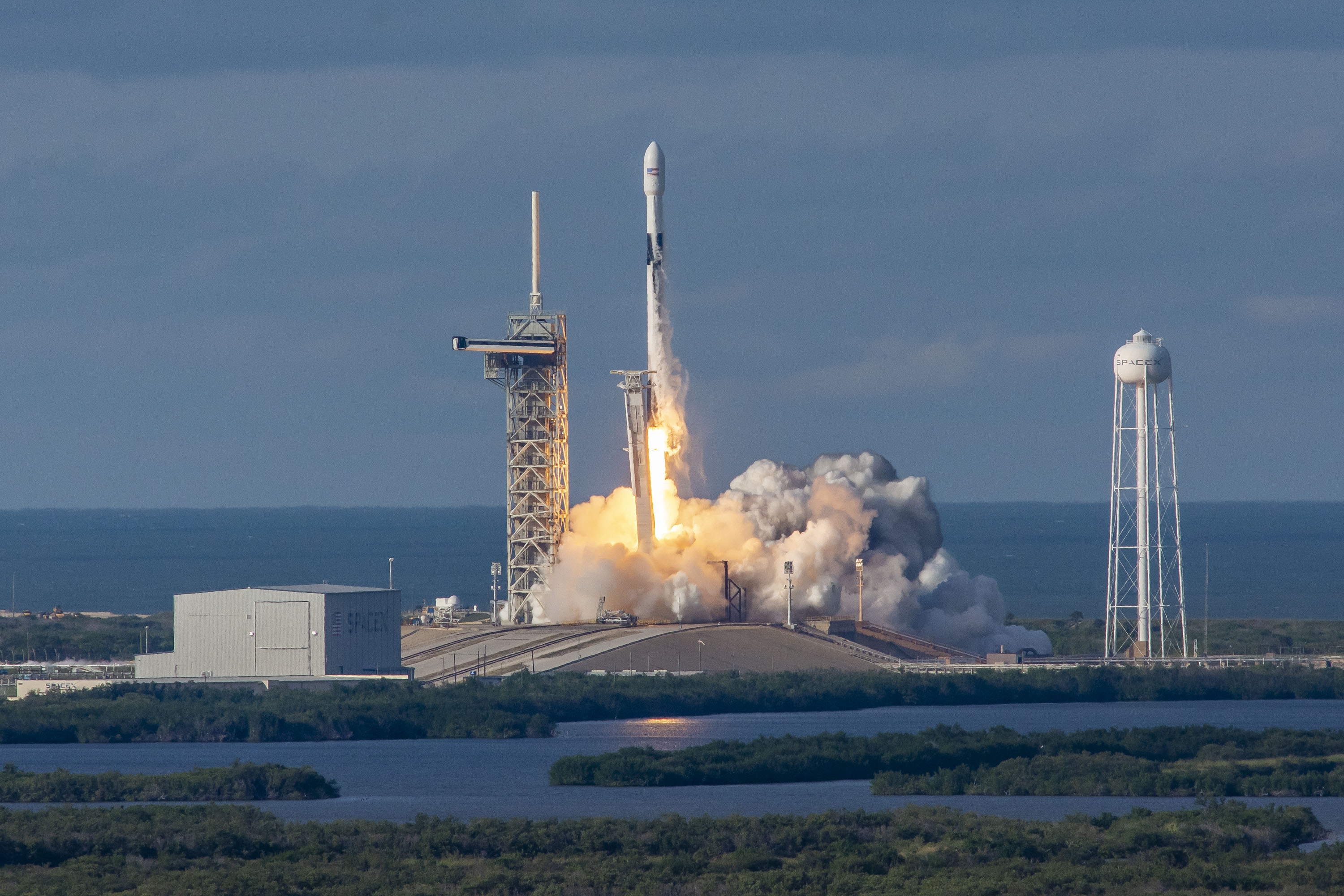
- Falcon 9 launching Es'hail-2
- Mission type: Communications
- Operator: Es'hailSat
- COSPAR ID: 2018-090A
- SATCAT no.: 43700
- Mission duration: 15 years (planned)

Spacecraft properties
- Bus: DS2000
- Manufacturer: Mitsubishi Electric
- Launch mass: 5,300 kilograms (11,700 lb)

Start of mission
- Launch date: 15 November 2018, 20:46 UTC
- Rocket: Falcon 9 Block 5
- Launch site: Kennedy LC-39A
- Contractor: SpaceX

Orbital parameters
- Reference system: Geocentric
- Regime: Geostationary
- Longitude: 26° East
- Inclination: 0.033
- Epoch: 60

Es'hail 2 (a.k.a. Qatar-OSCAR 100 or QO-100) is a Qatari satellite, launched aboard a SpaceX Falcon 9 rocket on November 15, 2018. Es'hail 2 was built by Japan's Mitsubishi Electric company, and operates at 26° East longitude along a geostationary orbit to provide direct-to-home television services in the Middle East and North Africa region. The satellite features 24 Ku-band and 11 Ka-band transponders to provide direct broadcasting services for television, government and commercial content distribution. In addition to commercial services, the payload of Es'hail 2 includes a linear transponder with a bandwidth of 500 kHz and 8 MHz for the amateur radio satellite service, with uplink on 2.4 GHz (13-cm band) and downlink on 10.45 GHz (3-cm band).

== Amateur radio transponders ==
Transponder	U/L FREQUENCY [MHz]				D/L FREQUENCY [MHz]				LO [MHz]	BW [MHz]
Transponder	Pol	Begin	Center	End	Pol	Begin	Center	End	LO [MHz]	BW [MHz]
NB	RHCP	2400,00	2400,245	2400,5	V	10489,50	10489,745	10490,0	8089,5	0,500
WB	RHCP	2401,5	2405,5	2409,5	H	10491	10495	10499	8089,5	8

=== "NB" Transponder (narrow band) ===
Linear Transponder for low power narrow bandwidth voice, morse and digital communication

- preferred modes: narrow band modes like SSB and CW, PSK
- 500 kHz allocated bandwidth
- non-inverting bent-pipe transponder
- Assumes 50 simultaneous 2-way carriers to serve 100 users
- X-Band Downlink (SAT-TV dish):
  - 90 cm dishes in rainy areas at EOC like Brazil or Thailand
  - 60 cm around coverage peak
  - 75 cm dishes at peak -2 dB
- Downlink polarisation on X-Band is vertical
- Uplink polarisation on S-Band is RHCP
- Uplink transmitter 5-10W PEP (22.5 dBi antenna gain, 75 cm dish)

The narrowband transponder is intended for conventional analogue and narrowband digital signals.

No transmissions should be made beyond the nominal edges of the transponder passbands. In particular, no operation should take place below the lower beacon nor above the upper beacon.

No uplinks should result in downlink signals that are stronger than these beacons. In the event that such signals are detected, they will be marked by a “LEILA” (LEIstungs Limit Anzeige, English: power level indicator) siren. When they have been marked by “LEILA”, operators should immediately reduce their uplink power (ERP).

No FM transmissions should be made to Es’hail-2 as these would use excessive power and bandwidth.

Uplink [MHz]	Downlink [MHz]	Available bandwidth [kHz]	Notes
do not transmit	10489,500 – 10489,505	5	Lower CW beacon
2400,005 – 2400,040	10489,505 – 10489,540	35	CW only
2400,040 – 2400,080	10489,540 – 10489,580	40	Narrowband digimodes (500 Hz max. BW)
2400,080 – 2400,150	10489,580 – 10489,650	70	Digimodes (2700 Hz max. BW)
2400,150 – 2400,245	10489,650 – 10489,745	95	SSB only (2700 Hz max. BW)
do not transmit	10489,745 – 10489,755	10	Middle beacon, 400 Bit/s BPSK
2400,255 – 2400,350	10489,755 – 10489,850	95	SSB only (2700 Hz max. BW)
2400,350 – 2400,495	10489,850 – 10489,995	145	Mixed modes (2700 Hz max. BW) & special purpose
do not transmit	10489,995 – 10490,000	5	Experimental beacon, CW and other modulations

=== "WB" Transponder (wide band) ===
Linear Transponder for Digital Amateur Television (DATV) and other highspeed data transmissions. First DATV transponder in space.

- 8 MHz bandwidth (1.5 MHz used by beacon)
- Uplink polarisation on S-Band is RHCP
- Downlink polarisation on X-Band is horizontal
- Beacon sending video from launch at 10491.500 MHz DVB-S2 QPSK 1.5MS FEC 4/5
- DVB-S2 is used as standard in most amateur transmissions
- 3 channels for wide (1000/1500 kS) transmissions, 14 channels for narrow (333 kS) transmissions, and 27 channels for very narrow (125/66/33 kS) transmissions
- Typical amateur data streams are between 400 and 1200 kbit
- Internet spectrum monitor and chat for transmission coordination
- Receive equipment on downlink:
  - 90 cm offset dish
  - standard Ku-band LNB
  - F6DZP MiniTiouner, Octagon SF4008 or SDR software decoders
- Uplink equipment:
  - 120 cm dish (preferably larger)
  - Minimum 30W of output power
  - SDR (Adalm-Pluto, LimeSDR, BladeRF)

All uplink transmissions should use the minimum power possible. QPSK transmissions should have a downlink signal with at least 1 dB lower power density than the Beacon – the web-based spectrum monitor enables users to set their uplink power to achieve this. Transmissions with symbol rates of less than 333 kS using 8PSK, 16 APSK or 32 APSK should use the minimum power density required to achieve successful reception.

=== Amateur Radio Operators ===
Well over 130+ amateur radio operators have used the amateur radio transponder in the first few weeks of operation.

== See also ==
- Es'hailSat
- Es'hail 1
