= TDS-01 =

Future Indian satellite

- Mission type: Technology demonstration
- Operator: ISRO

Spacecraft properties
- Bus: INSAT Satellite bus
- Manufacturer: ISRO

Start of mission
- Launch date: November 2026
- Rocket: PSLV
- Launch site: Satish Dhawan Space Centre FLP
- Contractor: ISRO

The Technology Demonstration Satellite-01 or TDS-01 is a planned Indian geostationary orbit technology demonstration satellite carrying payloads for ISRO's Institute of Plasma Research, Gandhinagar and the CSIR-CEERI, Pilani. Payloads to be tested included an internally developed 300 mN electric powered thruster, atomic clocks, travelling wave tube amplifiers (TWTA) and a quantum communication suite (QuTDS).

== Launch vehicle ==
TDS-1 is planned to fly on the first Polar Satellite Launch Vehicle (PSLV) built by industry rather than by ISRO. The rocket is being manufactured by a consortium of Hindustan Aeronautics Limited (HAL) and Larsen & Toubro (L&T) under a contract covering five PSLVs, with ISRO providing technical guidance. The arrangement marks a shift from traditional rocket manufacturing, which ISRO had previously led. In a February 2025 interview with the Times of India, ISRO chairman V. Narayanan described the mission as the first PSLV produced entirely by the private sector. He also said the satellite's 300 mN electric propulsion thruster, developed by ISRO's Liquid Propulsion Systems Centre, would be a first for an entirely indigenous system.

== Schedule ==
The mission was initially scheduled for the third quarter of 2025. By early 2026, ISRO's plans placed the first launch of the industry-built PSLV in 2026, with TDS-1 intended to demonstrate three main technologies: a high-thrust electric propulsion system, an indigenous travelling-wave tube amplifier and quantum key distribution. The contract for the industry-built PSLVs had been awarded to the HAL–L&T consortium in 2023, according to ThePrint. Commentators have described the collaboration among HAL, L&T and ISRO as a major turning point for India's space programme. They also noted remaining challenges, including the integration of multiple new technologies and the need for clear regulatory guidelines for private space enterprises.

== Satellite technologies ==
35 new technologies, ranging from atomic clocks to an Ion propulsion demonstration are planned for the satellite. The primary objective will be validation of a 300 milli-Newton (300 mN), 5.4 kW electric propulsion thruster developed by LPSC. This is expected to be an improvement over the smaller 75 mN thruster used on GSAT 9. It is hoped to reduce fuel load up to 90% with an initial demonstration quantity of less than 200 kg of Xenon, as compared to two tonnes for other Geostationary satellites. A 1000 hour Ground test of the plasma thruster was conducted on 27 March 2025 to test the flight model prior to integration. The plasma thruster will be used for orbit raising of satellite to the Geostationary orbit. Instrumentation to validate quantum key distribution technology and a traveling wave tube amplifier will also be demonstrated on this flight. Over ₹18,700 lakhs have been allotted for hardware development for a five year span from 2021 to 2026.

== See also ==
- TES
- APPLE
