= Daniel B. Seaton =

American solar physicist

Daniel B. Seaton is an American solar physicist based at the Southwest Research Institute (SwRI) in Boulder, Colorado. He is particularly known for his work on producing and interpreting images of the solar corona, using both visible light and extreme ultraviolet.

Seaton helped develop, and ultimately led, operations and data analysis for the groundbreaking PROBA-2/SWAP wide-field extreme-ultraviolet (EUV) coronal imaging instrument, controlled from the Royal Observatory of Belgium, from 2008 to 2015. More recent work includes using the GOES-17/SUVI instrument to reveal the extended EUV corona to distances above 3 solar radii.

In addition to carrying out current work on solar flares and the structure of the Sun's "middle corona", Seaton leads the Science Operations Center development for the PUNCH mission (a NASA Small Explorer) and for the CubIXSS cubesat mission, is Project Scientist of the SunCET solar imaging cubesat, and leads the Imaging & Analysis section of the Department of Solar and Heliospheric Physics at SwRI.

== Education ==
Seaton's undergraduate work at Williams College included eclipse expeditions with noted eclipse scientist Jay Pasachoff; he received his B.A. Astrophysics and Mathematics in 2001. His graduate work at University of New Hampshire with Terry Forbes included analytic theory of magnetic reconnection and solar flares, and concluded with conferral of a Ph.D. in Physics in 2008.

== Sportswriting ==
Seaton is also known for his work as a cycling journalist and photographer in Europe, primarily for the American cycling magazine VeloNews and in collaboration with the Hungarian-born photographer Balint Hamvas. His primary focus is the discipline of cyclo-cross; he has also reported on road races including the Spring Classics and Grand Tours.
