= PROBA-3 =

European Space Agency mission

- An artistic rendering of PROBA-3
- Mission type: Solar observatory technology demonstrator
- Operator: ESA
- Website: Website, Blog
- Mission duration: 2 years (nominal); 1 year, 11 months, 14 days (elapsed)

Spacecraft properties
- Manufacturer: S/C: SENER/Redwire/EADS CASA/GMV/SPACEBEL ASPIICS: CSL
- Launch mass: CSC and OSC in stack: 550 kilograms (1,210 lb)
- Dimensions: CSC: 1.1 m × 1.8 m × 1.7 m (3.6 ft × 5.9 ft × 5.6 ft); OSC: 0.9 m × 1.4 m (3.0 ft × 4.6 ft)

Start of mission
- Launch date: 5 December 2024, 10:34 UTC
- Rocket: PSLV-XL C-59
- Launch site: First Launch Pad,Satish Dhawan Space Centre
- Contractor: NSIL ISRO

Orbital parameters
- Reference system: Geocentric
- Regime: Highly elliptical Earth orbit
- Semi-major axis: 36,943 kilometres (22,955 mi)
- Eccentricity: 0.8111
- Perigee altitude: 600 kilometres (370 mi)
- Apogee altitude: 60,530 kilometres (37,610 mi)
- Inclination: 59 degrees
- Period: 19.7 hours
- RAAN: 153 degrees
- Argument of perigee: 188 degrees
- Epoch: planned
- General Support Technology Programme (GSTP) PROBA satellite series

PROBA-3 is a dual-probe technological demonstration mission by the European Space Agency devoted to high-precision formation flying to achieve scientific coronagraphy. It is part of the series of PROBA satellites that are being used to validate new spacecraft technologies and concepts while also carrying scientific instruments. It lifted off aboard ISRO's PSLV-XL rocket from Satish Dhawan Space Center in Sriharikota, India. The project is managed by Damien Galano.

== Mission concept ==
PROBA-3 consists of two independent, three-axis-stabilized spacecraft: the Coronagraph Spacecraft (CSC) and the Occulter Spacecraft (OSC). The spacecraft fly close to each other on a highly elliptical orbit around the Earth, with an apogee at 60,500 km altitude.

By flying in tight formation about 150 metres apart, the Occulter precisely casts its shadow onto the Coronagraph's telescope, blocking the Sun’s direct light. This allows the Coronagraph to image the faint solar corona in visible, ultraviolet and polarised light for many hours at a time.

Along the apogee arc, when the gravity gradient is significantly smaller, the two spacecraft will autonomously acquire a formation configuration, such that the CSC remains at a fixed position in the shadow cast by the OSC. The CSC hosts a coronagraph, which will then be able to observe the Sun's corona without being blinded by the intense light from the photosphere. Given the diameter of the occulter disk on the OSC and the intended corona observation regions, the CSC must be approximately 150 meters from the OSC and maintain this position with millimetric accuracy, both in range and laterally. The scientific objective is to observe the corona down to about 1.1 solar radius in the visible wavelength range.

Besides formation flying for coronagraphy, some demonstration manoeuvers (retargeting and resizing) were planned for the apogee phase of the orbit, as well as a space rendezvous experiment.

The formation acquisition and control is performed on-board by metrology equipment and actuators. The metrology equipment comprise a laser-based system providing high-accuracy relative position estimate, a video-based sensor with a coarser precision but wider field of view, and a shadow position sensor providing finest precision when the CSC is in the vicinity of the target position in the shadow cone.

After the apogee arc, the formation is broken by impulsive manoeuvers executed by the spacecraft. The two spacecraft are placed on a relative trajectory that passively ensures no risk of collision during the perigee passage, when the spacecraft altitude goes down to 600 km. Along the perigee phase of the orbit, the two spacecraft acquire GNSS data to derive a precise estimation of the relative position and velocity, which is propagated for a few hours up to the reacquisition of the metrology before the next apogee arc.

The CSC and OSC exchange sensor data and commands through a radio-frequency inter-satellite link to coordinate their activities. Scientists hope that PROBA-3's unique vantage point will provide new insights into the origins of coronal mass ejections (CMEs) – eruptions of solar material that can disrupt satellites and power grids on Earth. The mission also measures total solar irradiance, tracking changes in the Sun's energy output that may influence Earth's climate.

== Design ==
=== CSC and OSC spacecraft ===
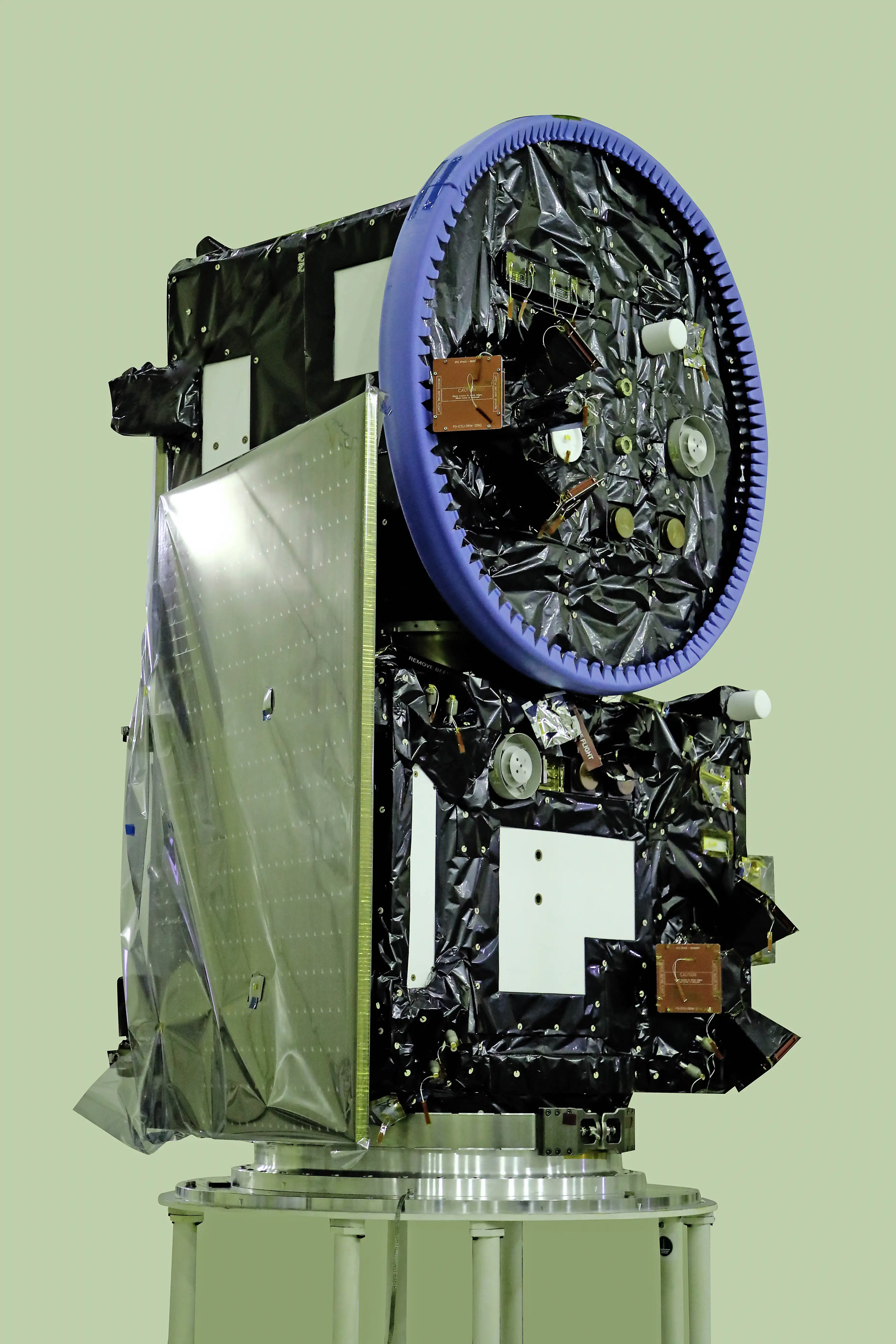
PROBA-3 spacecraft stack in clean-room

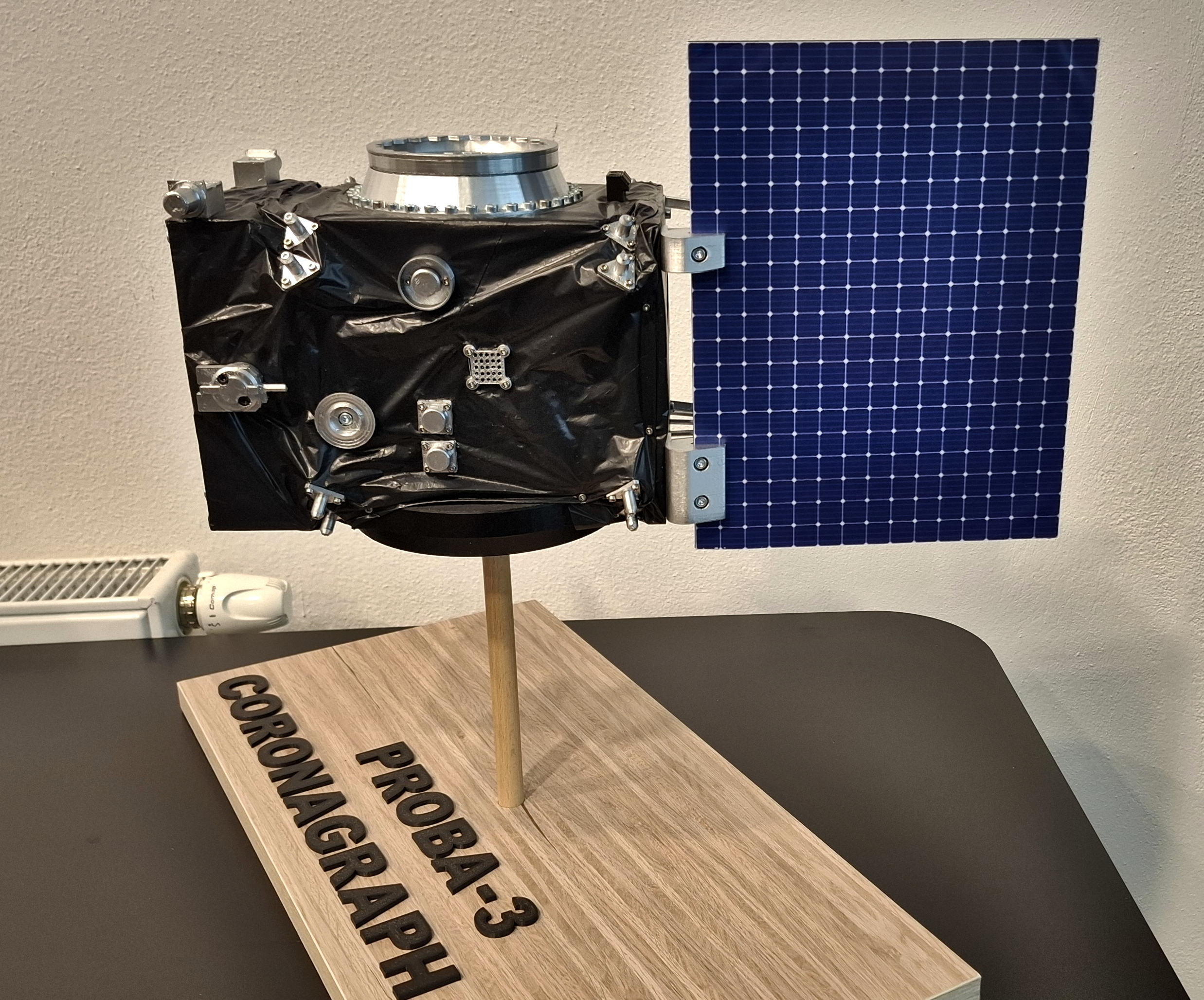
Coronagraph

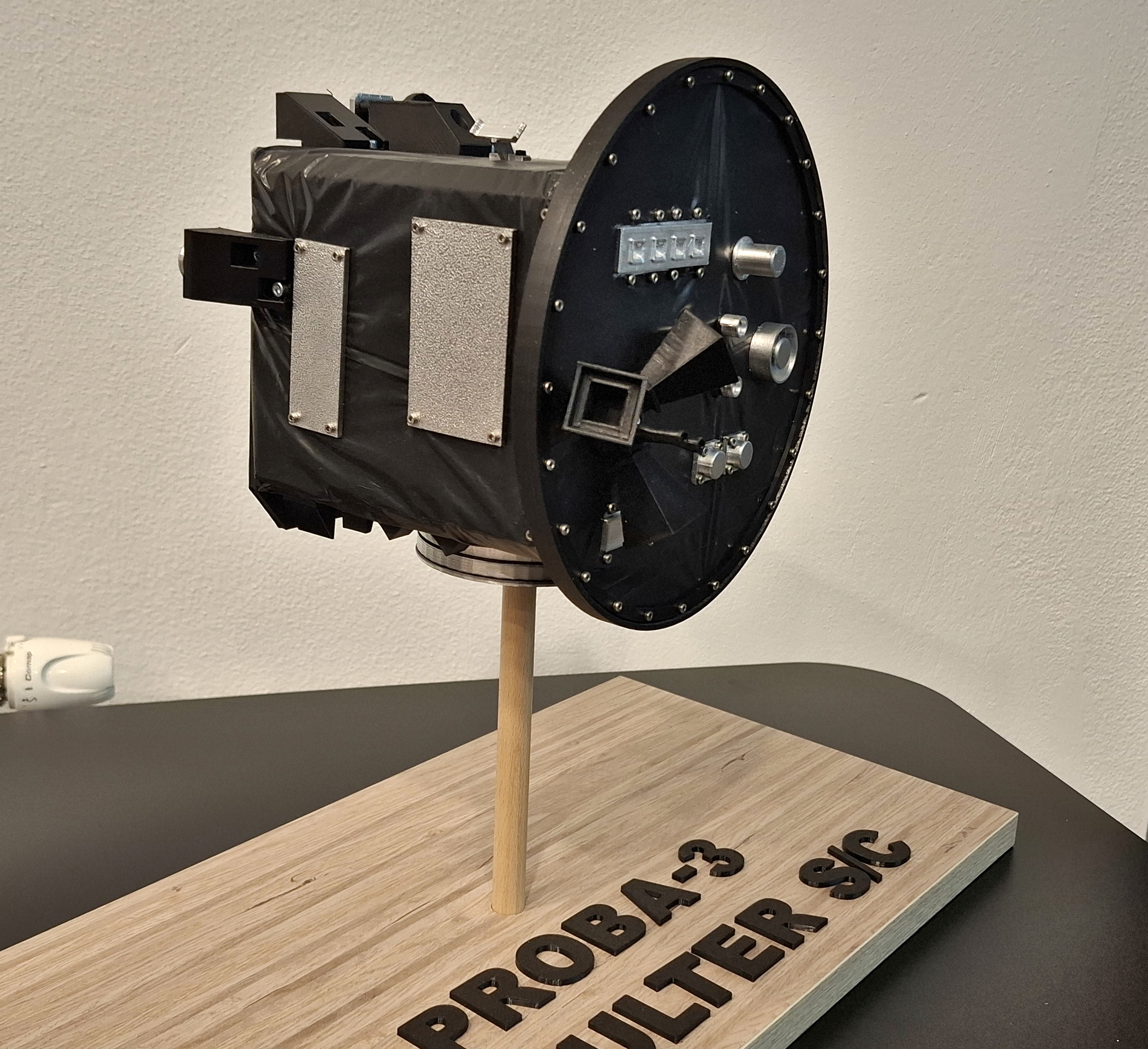
Occulter

Models of both components of the PROBA-3 satellite.

The CSC is a 300 kg mini-satellite, hosting the coronagraph ASPIICS and the shadow position sensors. It is equipped with a monopropellant propulsion system to perform the large-delta-V manoeuver necessary for formation acquisition and breaking. It also hosts the targets used by the metrology optical heads on board the OSC.

The OSC is a 250 kg mini-satellite, hosting the laser and visual metrology optical heads. It features the occulter disk that is 1.4 meters in diameter. The shape of its rim is intended to reduce the amount of diffracted sunlight entering the coronagraph. The OSC uses a low-thrust cold-gas propulsion system that enables the fine position control required for the formation flying.

=== Scientific payloads ===
The primary payload is the ASPIICS coronagraph. It follows the design concept of a classical externally occulted Lyot coronagraph, with the external occulter physically attached to the OSC, while the rest of the instrument is on the CSC.

ASPIICS observes the solar corona through refractive optics, able to select 3 different spectral bands: Fe XIV line at 530.4 nm, He I D3 line at 587.7 nm, and the broad spectral band 540–570 nm. ASPIICS is designed to fill the gap in term of field of view between EUV imagers and externally occulted coronagraphs, when the latter are monolithic instruments that don't benefit from the longer distance enabled by formation flying. ASPIICS takes one or two images per minute. The principal investigator for the coronagraph instrument is Andrei Zhukov from Royal Observatory of Belgium. The front door, protecting ASPIICS from sunlight when not occulted, was developed by the Czech company VZLU Aerospace.

A secondary scientific payload (DARA) is hosted on the OSC. DARA stands for "Davos Absolute Radiometer" and is an absolute radiometer for measuring total solar irradiance (TSI).

=== Ground segment and operations ===
Like the other PROBA satellites, PROBA-3 is operated from the ESA center in Redu, Belgium.

== Background ==
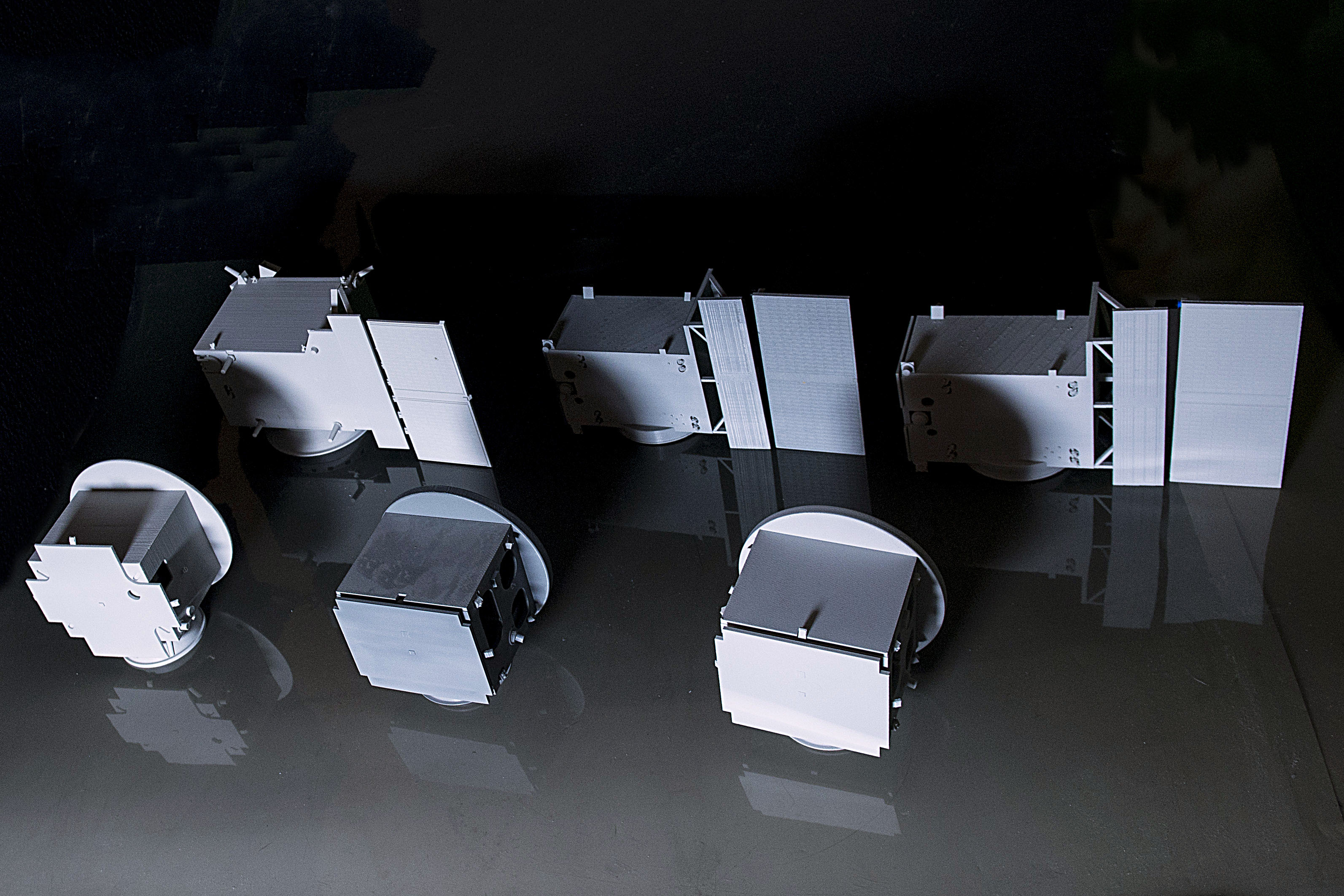
Design evolution of PROBA-3 shown by a trio of 3D models

PROBA-3 is a project managed by the European Space Agency. The industrial development of the S/C and the ground segment is led by SENER Aerospace, which coordinates the work of a core team with Airbus Defence and Space, QinetiQ Space, GMV, Celestia Antwerp BV, and Spacebel.

The coronagraph payload is developed for ESA by a consortium led by Liège Space Center (CSL) in Belgium, made up of 15 companies and institutes from five ESA member states. DARA was provided by the PMOD institute in Switzerland.

== Timeline ==
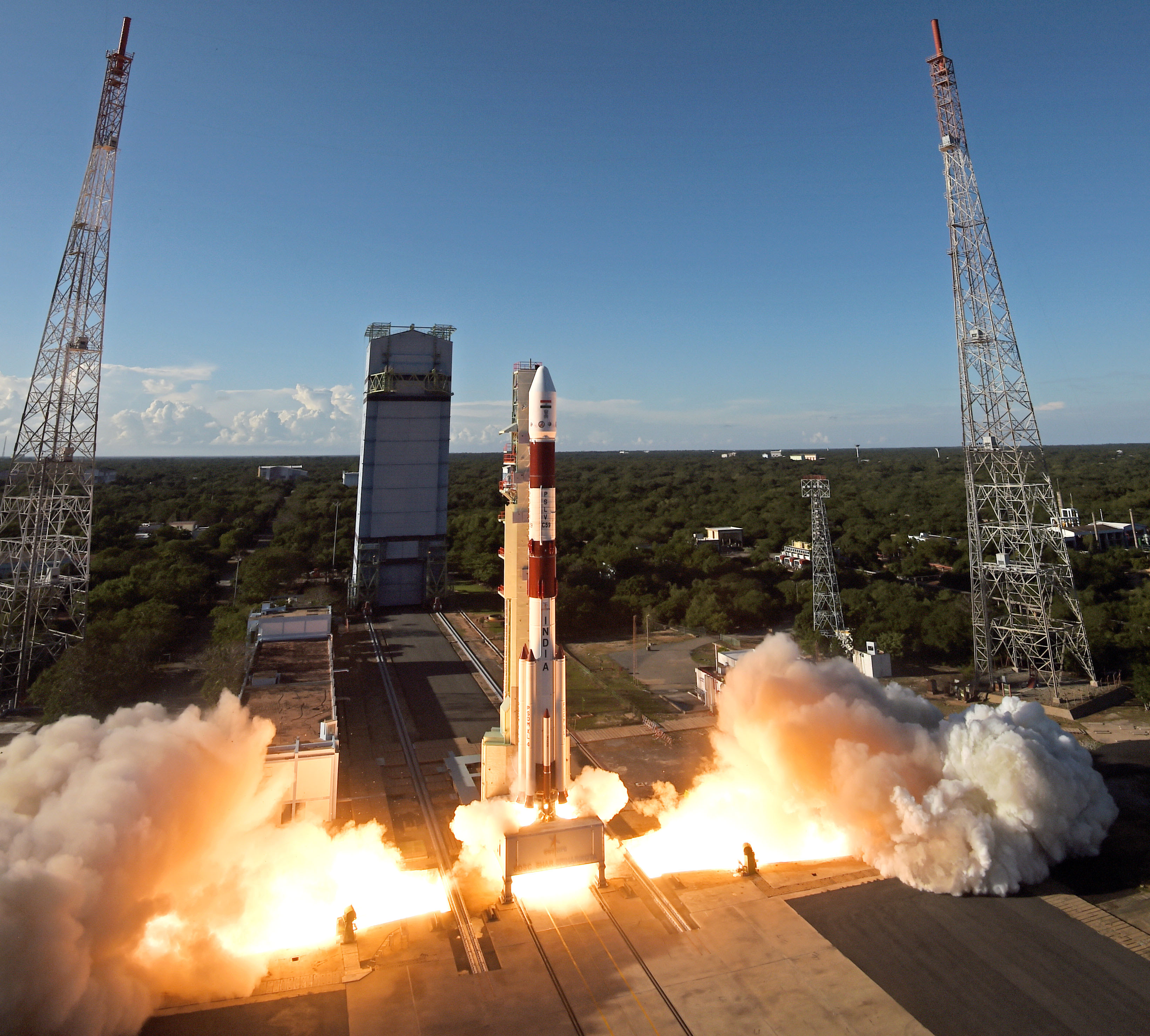
PROBA-3 launch

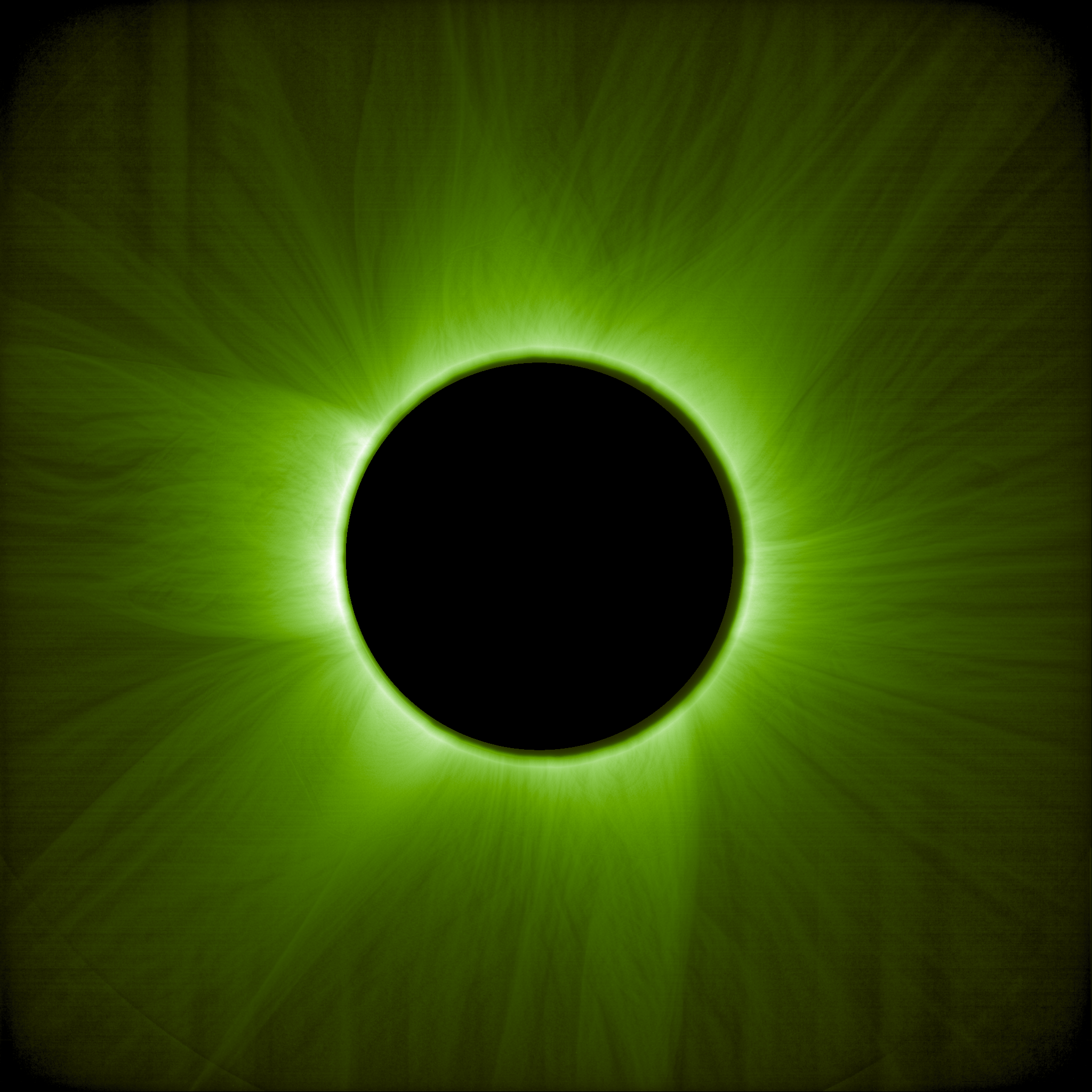
Solar corona seen on 23 May 2025 by the ASPIICS coronagraph aboard PROBA-3

Coronal mass ejection seen on 16 July 2025 by PROBA-2, PROBA-3, and SOHO

=== Development ===
The mission concept dates to 2005, when a study was performed in the ESA CDF. After several phase-A studies and a change of industrial organisation at the beginning of the phase B, the mission's implementation phase (phases C/D/E1) eventually began in July 2014. The system Critical Design Review was completed in 2019.

Testing of the mission's vision-based sensor system was performed at ESA's ESTEC technical centre in the Netherlands in March 2021. The two spacecraft were integrated before environmental campaign was completed as of March 2023.

=== Launch campaign ===
The twin spacecraft reached the launch site, Satish Dhawan Space Center on the Eastern coast of India on 3 November 2024. Following check out, the spacecraft were stacked into their launch configuration, fueled with hydrazine, and successfully launched on 5 December 2024.

=== In orbit ===
While the two spacecraft were still attached to each other, the ASPIICS coronograph took its very first in-space image (a star field in the constellation of Ophiuchus) in order to test the accuracy of the mission’s pointing. On 14 January 2025, the two spacecraft successfully separated from each other and on 24 January 2025, they were again brought closer together by a series of maneuvers that resulted in them maintaining a separation of minimum 1,000 meters.

On 7 February 2025, the Occulter Spacecraft took the first picture of the Coronagraph Spacecraft while at a distance of several kilometers. In March 2025, the two spacecraft were brought to a distance of 200 metres to test target pointing and the Visual Based System on the Occulter Spacecraft took a series of images of the Coronagraph Spacecraft. This was the first light of the Visual Based System. Then the spacecraft were commanded to switch to autonomous pointing mode for the first time.

Later in March 2025, the two spacecraft performed the first demonstration of autonomous formation flying, with the CSC pointing toward the Sun while staying aligned in the OSC shadow. In May 2025, ESA announced that the two spacecraft achieved the desired precision of formation flying, maintaining their relative position for several hours with a millimetre accuracy.

=== Results ===
In June 2025, ESA published the first images of the solar corona taken by PROBA-3. In December 2025, ESA published the first video of the inner solar corona taken by PROBA-3 showing how it can fill the observation gap between the UV telescopes observing the photosphere and the coronagraphs observing the outer regions. ESA also published a video of a formation manoeuver where the OSC is seen approaching the CSC down to 30 meters.

By the end of 2025, PROBA-3 had created more than 50 artificial solar eclipses over around 250 hours of observation time. Between 19 and 23 January 2026, ISRO and ESA conducted a workshop at IIST in Thiruvanthapuram, presenting the complementary data from Aditya-L1, PROBA-3, and Solar Orbiter.

The first scientific results from the mission were published in March 2026 in the journal The Astrophysical Journal Letters. Researches used the unique ability of PROBA-3's ASPIICS instrument to observe the Sun's inner corona over long time and measured the speed of "plasma blobs", which are responsible for the slow solar wind. The results show speeds three to four times faster than expected.

=== Coronagraph anomaly ===
On the weekend of 14–15 February 2026, the Coronagraph Spacecraft suffered an anomaly which caused it to lose orientation, to drift away from the Occulter Spacecraft, and prevented it from entering into safe mode. ESA lost contact with the spacecraft. The problem was later identified as an extremely low-probability software issue during reaction wheel desaturation. As of 6 March 2026, the Occulter Spacecraft was healthy and ESA was investigating how to use it to observe the Coronagraph Spacecraft and support the recovery efforts.

By mid-March, ESA managed to locate the Coronagraph Spacecraft using optical and radar data processed by the agency's Space Debris Office. Based on this data, ESA was working on characterizing the spacecraft's rotation in order to precisely time the sending of signals. On 18 March, ESA has reestablished contact with the Coronagraph Spacecraft. It was in safe mode and stable condition. In late March 2026, ESA has also reestablished the inter-satellite link between the two spacecraft and used it to monitor their relative distance ranging between 8 and 48 km. The Coronagraph Spacecraft, still in safe mode, was spinning around one axis while staying pointed at the Sun.

On 1 April 2026, the Coronagraph Spacecraft was commanded to transition from safe mode to manual mode. The operators activated the spacecraft's thrusters and used them to stop its spinning. The Coronagraph Spacecraft thus regained its three-axis stabilisation. By 21 April 2026, ESA successfully re-tested the ASPIICS instrument by taking a star field picture, confirming that it was in good condition. In June 2026, the two spacecraft performed their first formation flight since the anomaly and ESA announced that they were ready to resume their routine operations. ESA also officially extended the mission until August 2028. In July 2026, the Coronagraph Spacecraft and its ASPIICS instrument were operating normally.

== See also ==
- List of European Space Agency programmes and missions
- List of heliophysics missions
- Prisma
- ESA's PROBA missions:
  - PROBA-1
  - PROBA-2
  - PROBA-V
