= Swapping =

Swapping may refer to:

- Barter
- Exchange (disambiguation)
- Trading
- Clothing swap
- Swap meet or flea market
- Book swapping
- Wife swapping
- Cumswapping

== Science and technology ==
- Address space swapping, a form of memory management used in MVS
- Hot swapping
- Page swapping
- Region swapping, an older form of memory management
- Segment swapping

== See also ==
- Swap (disambiguation)
