= ALTIUS =

Planned ozone monitoring satellite

- Mission type: Earth Observation
- Operator: European Space Agency
- Website: https://www.esa.int/Applications/Observing_the_Earth/Altius
- Mission duration: >3 years (design lifetime)

Spacecraft properties
- Spacecraft: ALTIUS
- Bus: PROBA
- Manufacturer: QinetiQ Space
- Launch mass: 266 kilograms (586 lb)
- Dry mass: 254 kilograms (560 lb)

Start of mission
- Launch date: Q4 2028 (planned)
- Rocket: Vega-C
- Launch site: Kourou ELV
- Contractor: Arianespace

Orbital parameters
- Reference system: Sun-synchronous orbit
- Regime: Low Earth
- Altitude: ≈668 km
- Repeat interval: 3 days

Main payload
- Name: ALTIUS instrument
- Type: Multi-channel tuneable spectral imager
- Wavelengths: UV: 250-355 nm (tuneable); VIS: 440-675 nm (tuneable); NIR 600-1020 nm (tuneable)
- Resolution: 1 to 3 km (vertically)
- ESA insignia General Support Technology Programme (GSTP)

ALTIUS (Atmospheric Limb Tracker for Investigation of the Upcoming Stratosphere) is a satellite mission proposed by the Belgian Institute for Space Aeronomy and currently under development by the European Space Agency (ESA). Its main objective is to monitor the distribution and evolution of stratospheric ozone in the Earth's atmosphere. The mission is scheduled for launch in Q4 2028 from the Guiana Space Centre on Vega-C.

== Background ==
The industrial consortium is led by QinetiQ Space (now Redwire Space), acting as mission prime. The satellite design is based on the PROBA small satellite bus. The payload, developed by OIP Sensor Systems, is an innovative UV, visible, and NIR instrument. The satellite is primarily funded by Belgium, with additional support from Canada, Luxembourg, and Romania.

The ground segment for data processing is developed by a consortium under the prime contractor Spacebel in Belgium, with scientific support from the Belgian Institute for Space Aeronomy (BISA) and the University of Saskatchewan in Canada.

Satellite operations post launch will be conducted from the ESA’s European Space Security and Education Centre in Redu, Belgium.

== History ==
In January 24, 2020, ESA has awarded a contract, worth €75 million, to QinetiQ Space (now Redwire Space) to build the satellite. In January 2022, ESA signed a contract with Arianespace for the joint launch of ALTIUS and FLEX on Vega-C. In July 2025, Redwire has completed the assembly of ALTIUS' satellite platform at their facilities in Belgium. In March 2026, Redwire successfully tested the deployment of the satellite's solar panels.

== See also ==
- List of European Space Agency programs and missions
- List of Earth observation satellites
- PROBA
