= Hessa al-Jaber =

Qatari engineer and politician (born 1959)

- حصة الجابر
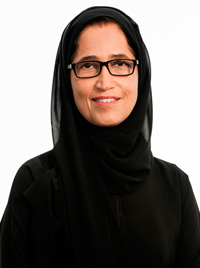

Minister of Information and Communications Technology
- In office 26 June 2013 – 26 January 2016
- Monarch: Tamim bin Hamad Al Thani
- Prime Minister: Abdullah bin Nasser Al Thani
- Preceded by: New ministry
- Succeeded by: None (ministry merged)

Member of the Consultative Assembly
- In office 2017–

Personal details
- Born: 1959 (age 66–67) Doha, Qatar
- Education: Kuwait University; George Washington University

Hessa bint Sultan al-Jaber (Arabic: حصة الجابر; born 1959 in Doha, Qatar) is a Qatari engineer, academic and politician. She was the first Minister of Information and Communications Technology in Qatar following the formation of a new cabinet by the Emir Tamim Bin Hamad Al Thani in 2013. In 2017 she was one of four women appointed to the Consultative Assembly, becoming one of the country's first female parliamentarians.

== Education ==
Hessa al-Jaber holds a Bachelor of Science in engineering from Kuwait University (1981), and a master's degree and PhD in Computer Science from George Washington University in Washington, D.C. (1990).

== Career ==
Prior to becoming a minister, Al Jaber held the position of Secretary General of the Supreme Council of Information and Communication Technology since its inception in 2005. During her tenure, she oversaw the liberalization of Qatar's telecommunications market and sought to expand ICTs in society by modernizing the infrastructure. The national broadband network was also established, as well as the Qatar Satellite Company, which launched Qatar's first satellite, Es'hailSat, in August 2013.

In June 2016, she was appointed to the supervisory board of the Volkswagen Group. At the United Nations, she is a member of a commission for digital development. She is a member of the board of directors of the American School of Doha and of the Meeza.

Currently, she is United Nations ITU broadband commissioner for digital development, commissioner for the WHO/ITU Commission on Information and Accountability for Women and Children's Health, and a member of several boards of directors, including; Qatar University's board of trustees, the board of governors of the American School of Doha, Bloomsbury Qatar Foundation Journals, Qatar Foundation National Research Forum, the Qatar Financial Markets Authority, and the Network of Global Agenda Councils of the WEF. She is also the board chairperson of Qatar Satellite Company (Es’hailSat), the chairperson of Mada's board of directors, the Malomatia IT Services Authority, and chair of the board of trustees of the Community College of Qatar.

Hessa al Jaber is chairman of Trio Investment, a technology investment company that invests in health technology.

Al Jaber was appointed to the Consultative Council in November 2017 by Emir Tamim bin Hamad Al Thani. She was a member of the council until 2021.

Al Jaber was appointed to the board of Singapore-based DroobiSmit in 2023. She was also a speaker at the TRT World Forum in December 2023 held in Istanbul.

With knowledge of ICT development, Al Jaber is a contributor to several working papers, studies, and researches at relevant Arab and global conferences and symposiums.

Al Jaber is the president of the Qatar Auto Museum.

== Awards and recognition ==
In recognition of her public service, Al Jaber was honored by the ministry of interior as the "National Figure of the Year" on 24 December 2008 to honor key Qatari figures which made significant contributions during that year. In 2012, she was also named the 30th most powerful Arab woman by Arabian Business.

In 2013, she was listed among the 500 most powerful Arabs in the world on Arabian Business magazine, then ranked 20th on the 2013 Arabian Business' list of 100 most powerful Arab women and, most recently, the Internet Society inducted her as one of eight international Internet leaders to the 2013 Internet Hall of Fame Advisory Board. Moreover, Mashable, which covers global social media news, named her among the eight most impressive women working in technology throughout the world during the 2000s.
