= TET-1 =

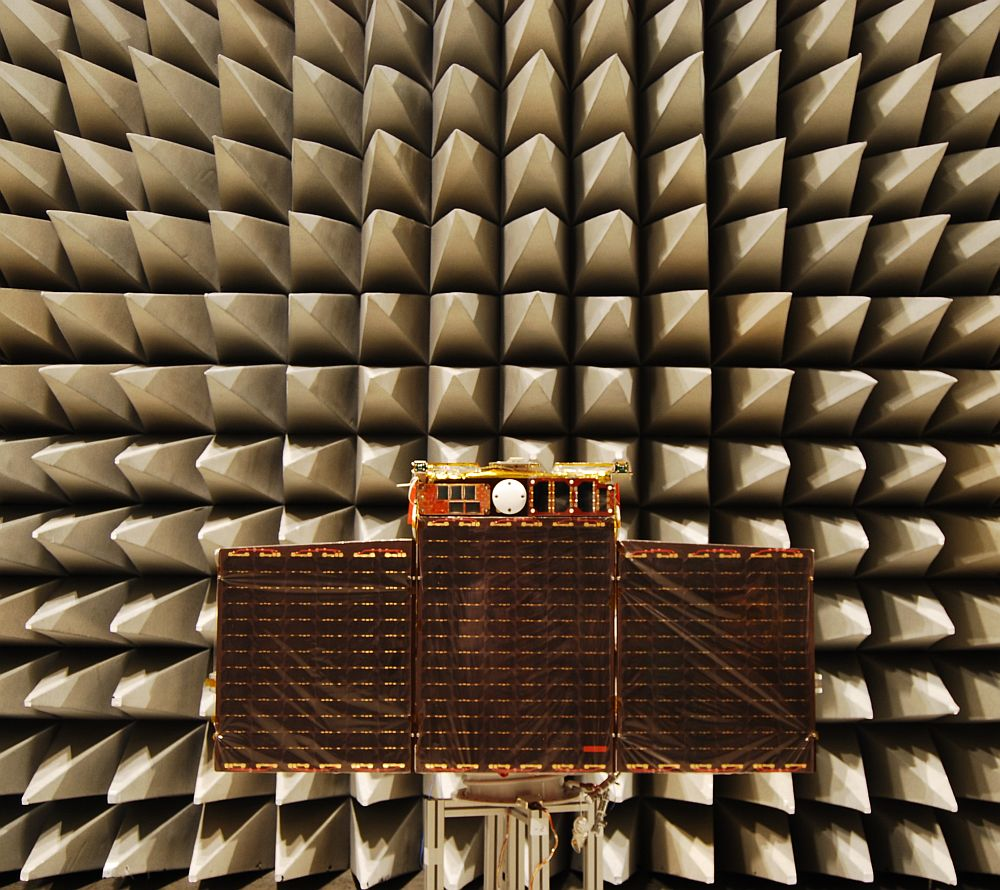
- TET-1 undergoing testing
- Mission type: Technology
- Operator: DLR
- COSPAR ID: 2012-039D
- SATCAT no.: 38710

Spacecraft properties
- Manufacturer: Kayser-Threde GmbH

Start of mission
- Launch date: 22 July 2012, 06:41 UTC
- Rocket: Soyuz-FG/Fregat
- Launch site: Baikonur 31/6

End of mission
- Last contact: 17 November 2022
- Decay date: 18 November 2022

Orbital parameters
- Reference system: Geocentric
- Regime: Low Earth

TET-1 (German: Technologieerprobungsträger 1, Technology Experiment Carrier) was a microsatellite operated by the German Space Operations Center of the German Aerospace Center. It was the centre of the OOV (On Orbit Verification) Program, initiated to offer on-orbit verification possibilities to the German industrial and scientific aerospace community. TET was based on the satellite bus used for the BIRD satellite, which was launched in 2001.

The main contractor for Phase A (feasibility) was IABG. The final contract for Phases B, C, and D (definition/qualification, and production) and start was given to Kayser-Threde GmbH, a medium-sized aerospace company based in Munich belonging to the German OHB-System group. The environmental qualification was successfully conducted in the IABG space simulation centre in Munich.

TET-1 was carried to orbit as a secondary payload on a Soyuz-FG/Fregat carrier rocket which was launched from the Baikonur Cosmodrome on 22 July 2012. The primary payload of the launch was the Kanopus-V1 satellite, with the BelKA-2, Zond-PP and exactView-1 satellites also flying on the same rocket.

After 10 years in orbit, the TET-1 satellite re-entered into the atmosphere on 18 November 2022.
