= Eutelsat 25B/Es'hail 1 =

- Mission type: Communications
- Operator: Eutelsat, Es'hailSat
- COSPAR ID: 2013-044A
- SATCAT no.: 39233
- Mission duration: 15 years (planned)

Spacecraft properties
- Bus: Space Systems/Loral's 1300
- Launch mass: 6,300 kilograms (13,900 lb)

Start of mission
- Launch date: 29 August 2013, 20:30:07 UTC

Orbital parameters
- Reference system: Geocentric
- Regime: Geostationary
- Longitude: 25.5 east
- Perigee altitude: 35,788 kilometres (22,238 mi)
- Apogee altitude: 35,801 kilometres (22,246 mi)
- Inclination: 0.05 degrees
- Period: 1436.15 minutes
- Epoch: 30 August 2015 UTC

Eutelsat 25B or Es'hail 1 is Qatar's first satellite. It is a communications satellite operated by Es'hailSat. The satellite is based on a Space Systems/Loral 1300 satellite bus, and was launched into orbit on an Ariane 5 rocket from Kourou Space Center. In 2018 Eutelsat sold its interest in the satellite to Es’hailSat for €135 million.

== See also ==
- Es'hailSat
- Es'hail 2
