= The Swap =

The Swap may refer to:

- Kukačky (The Swap), Czech family comedy-drama series debuting in 2021
- The Swap (1979 film), an American neo-noir film
- The Swap (2016 film), an American teen film aired on the Disney Channel
- The Swap (TV series), a 2011 British crime drama series

== See also ==
- Swap (disambiguation)
