= PROBA-V CubeSat Companion =

European technology demonstration CubeSat for Earth observation

- Operator: European Space Agency
- COSPAR ID: 2023-155K
- SATCAT no.: 58025

Spacecraft properties
- Spacecraft type: 12U CubeSat
- Manufacturer: (Belgium) Aerospacelab

Start of mission
- Launch date: 9 October 2023
- Rocket: Vega
- Launch site: Guiana Space Centre

The PROBA-V CubeSat Companion (PVCC) is a technology demonstration and Earth observation satellite by the European Space Agency (ESA). It is hosting one spectral imager, a spare unit built for the PROBA-V's Vegetation instrument (VGT). The VGT instrument itself was originally developed for the French SPOT satellites. PVCC's goal is to test the abilities of a small CubeSat platform using a well-understood instrument and to cross-calibrate its vegetation growth observations with the Copernicus programme's Sentinel-2 and Sentinel-3 missions. PVCC was launched on the Vega rocket flight VV23 in October 2023.

== See also ==
- List of European Space Agency programmes and missions
- PROBA satellite series
