= LYRA =

Ultraviolet radiometer

Lyman Alpha Radiometer
- Alternative names: LYRA

LYRA (Lyman Alpha Radiometer) is the solar UV radiometer on board Proba-2, a European Space Agency technology demonstration satellite that was launched on November 2, 2009.

LYRA has been designed and manufactured by a Belgian-Swiss-German consortium (ROB-SIDC, PMOD/WRC, IMOMEC, CSL, MPS and BISA) with additional international collaborations (Japan, USA, Russia, and France). Jean-François Hochedez (ROB) is Principal Investigator, Yves Stockman (CSL) is Project Manager, and Werner Schmutz (PMOD) is Lead co-Investigator.

LYRA will monitor the Solar irradiance in four UV passbands. They have been chosen for their relevance to solar physics, aeronomy and Space Weather:

1. the 115-125 nm Lyman-α channel,
2. the 200-220 nm Herzberg continuum channel,
3. the Aluminium filter channel (17-50 nm) including He II at 30.4 nm, and
4. the Zirconium filter channel (1-20 nm).

The Radiometric calibration of the instrument is traceable to Synchrotron source standards, Physikalisch-Technische Bundesanstalt (PTB) and National Institute of Standards and Technology (NIST). Its stability will be monitored by onboard calibration light sources (light-emitting diodes), which allow distinguishing between potential degradations of the detectors and filters. Additionally, a redundancy strategy contributes to the accuracy and the stability of the measurements. LYRA will benefit from wide bandgap detectors based on diamond: it will be the first space assessment of a pioneering UV detectors program. Diamond sensors make the instruments radiation-hard and solar-blind: their high bandgap energy makes them quasi-insensitive to visible light (see also references in Marchywka Effect). The SWAP extreme ultraviolet (EUV) imaging telescope will operate next to LYRA on Proba-2. Together, they will establish a high performance solar monitor for operational space weather nowcasting and research. LYRA demonstrates technologies important for future missions such as the ESA Solar Orbiter mission.
