= SWAP (New Horizons) =

Instrument measuring solar ejecta around Pluto

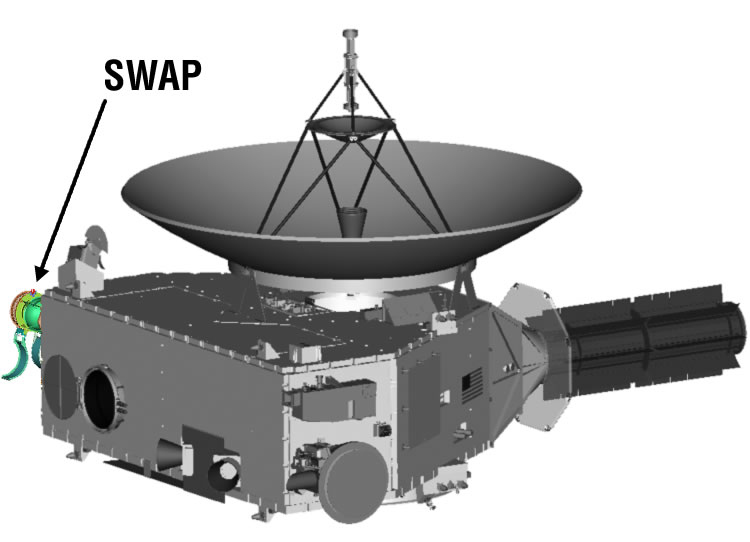
Diagram of where SWAP is mounted on New Horizons

SWAP (solar wind around Pluto) is a science instrument aboard the unmanned New Horizons space probe, which was designed to fly by dwarf planet Pluto. SWAP was designed to record solar wind en route, at, and beyond Pluto. At Pluto, SWAP's purpose was to record the relationship between the solarwind and ions and/or material entering space from the atmosphere of Pluto.

== Background ==
The atmosphere of Pluto was discovered in 1988, but it remained enigmatic and it was hard to understand an atmosphere existing in such low temperatures (45 K, −230 °C, −380 °F). One of the ideas about Pluto is atmospheric loss, with Pluto being compared to losses from comets. The idea of atmospheric loss was suggested in 1980, even before the atmosphere was discovered. One idea is the photoionization of escaping neutral particles might alter the flow solar wind around the dwarf planet. The atmosphere was known to be very tenuous compared to Earth, and one of the questions was how the gases were interacting with the solar wind and sunlight, likewise weaker at Pluto's orbit than at Earth's. One of the ideas was that Pluto's atmosphere would be stripped away by the solar wind over time.

By the 2010s, only three other spacecraft besides New Horizons have collected extensive data about the solar wind beyond 10 AU: Voyager 2, Pioneer 10, and Pioneer 11.

== Overview ==
SWAP is designed to be able to detect the sparse solar wind concentration at 32 AU, which is about three orders of magnitude less than near Earth (1 AU). However, at that distance the flow of the Solar Wind is still supersonic, and thus liable to create a bow shock around an obstacle (at the distance of about 4.5 Pluto radii from the surface). One of the areas of investigation is the relationship between high altitude atmospheric loss and the solar wind. After the July 2015 flyby of Pluto by New Horizons, data from SWAP was used to study the nature of Pluto's interaction with the solar wind. It was determined that NH crossed the plutopause, that separates the solar wind plasma from one bound to Pluto, and then passed through a heavy ion tail.

Earlier in the mission SWAP was intended to observe the Solar Wind around Jupiter. SWAP was also designed to be used in conjunction with PEPPSI and REX, to study how the solar wind changes with greater distance from the Sun. SWAP took only limited observations before 2012, but after that took a greater amount of data.

Starting in 2012, while the rest of the spacecraft was in hibernation most of the time, SWAP was turned on to collect data about the Solar wind as it journeyed out to Pluto at 33 AU. SWAP recorded data about solar wind in the outer solar system and beyond Pluto, and some of the data that is sought about the solar wind are the proton density, speed, and temperature.

One of the observations made with SWAP was that the cross-section of the Pluto's interaction region was limited to about six Pluto radii (about 7000 kilometers); this was smaller than expected.

== Design ==
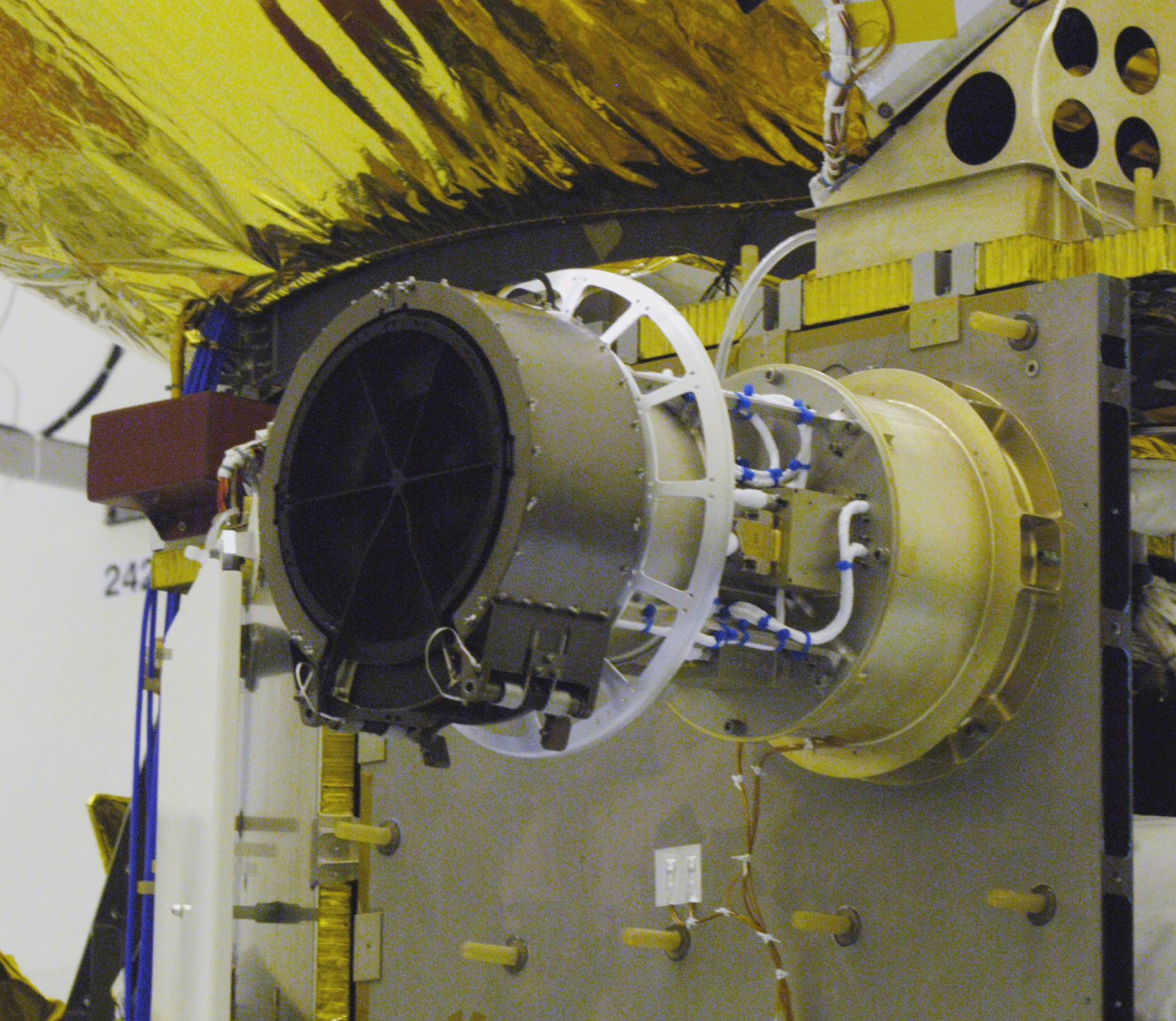
SWAP mounted to New Horizons spacecraft

SWAP is a top-hat electrostatic analyzer. SWAP has a barrier known as the Retarding Potential Analyzer (RPA) that can be open or shut depending on the conditions. When closed ions must pass through the RPA before reaching the inner detectors. Beyond the orbit of Jupiter, it was not necessary to have the RPA engaged for measurements to protect the sensors from being overloaded. The RPA can protect the sensors from being overloaded by solar wind intensities that are too strong, as the device is also required to measure much fainter solar wind fluxes at 33 AU from Sun where Pluto would be at the time of the flyby, and even beyond. SWAP can detect ions up to 6.5 kiloelectron volts (keV).

SWAP weighs 3.3 kilograms (7.3 pounds) and uses an average of 2.3 watts of spacecraft electrical power.

Overall swap is designed to study the solar wind, including at the distant of 32 AU, and to study atmospheric loss from the atmosphere of Pluto.

== See also ==
- MAVEN (explored the Martian atmospheric loss, Mars orbiter of the 2010s)
- SWAP (instrument) (similarly named spacecraft instrument on a Solar space observatory)
- SWEAP (instrument on the Parker Solar Probe)
