= Kayser-Threde =

Kayser-Threde GmbH
- Company type: Private
- Industry: Aerospace, industrial systems, optics, telematics
- Headquarters: Munich, Germany
- Area served: Worldwide
- Products: Scientific instruments for space missions, optical systems, telematics, crash test data acquisition, process control systems
- Parent: Merged into OHB System AG in 2014

Kayser-Threde GmbH based in Munich, Germany is a systems house specializing in applications in crewed and uncrewed space missions, optics, telematics, crash test data acquisition, and process control for the rail sector. On September 1, 2014, Bremen-based OHB System AG and Munich-based Kayser-Threde GmbH merged under the name OHB System AG, combining both companies' capabilities and capacities.

== Space ==
Kayser-Threde has delivered over 100 scientific instruments, systems and sub-systems for crewed space stations, satellites and interplanetary missions. Optical systems and subsystems for eight space telescopes and space cameras for astronomical, and earth observation have been implemented.

== Industrial applications ==
- Automotive
- Process Control Systems

The automotive and process control applications have their origins in Kayser-Threde's astronautics activities. Thus, they are examples for transfer of technology spin-off.
