= PROBA-2 =

European Space Agency satellite

- Mission type: Technology; Space weather
- Operator: European Space Agency
- COSPAR ID: 2009-059B
- SATCAT no.: 36037
- Mission duration: 2 years (planned); 16 years, 11 months and 25 days (in progress)

Spacecraft properties
- Bus: PROBA
- Manufacturer: Verhaert Design & Development (now QinetiQ Space)
- Launch mass: 120 kilograms (260 lb)
- Dimensions: 0.60m x 0.70m x 0.85m
- Power: 120 watts

Start of mission
- Launch date: 2 November 2009, 01:50:00 UTC
- Rocket: Rokot/Briz-KM
- Launch site: Plesetsk 133/3

Orbital parameters
- Reference system: Geocentric
- Regime: Sun-synchronous
- Perigee altitude: 713 kilometres (443 mi)
- Apogee altitude: 733 kilometres (455 mi)
- Inclination: 98.28 degrees
- Period: 99.12 minutes
- Epoch: 24 January 2015, 13:01:08 UTC
- ESA solar system insignia for the PROBA-2 mission General Support Technology Programme (GSTP) PROBA satellite series

PROBA-2 is the second satellite in the European Space Agency's series of PROBA low-cost satellites that are being used to validate new spacecraft technologies while also carrying scientific instruments. PROBA-2 is a small satellite (130 kg) developed under an ESA General Support Technology Program (GSTP) contract by a Belgian consortium led by Verhaert (now QinetiQ Space) of Kruibeke, Belgium. The nominal mission duration was two years. As of 2022, the mission continues.

== Mission summary ==
It was launched on 2 November 2009, with the Rockot launch system together with ESA's SMOS mission. The platform was launched in a Sun-synchronous orbit low Earth orbit (altitude of 725 km).

PROBA-2 contains five scientific instruments. Two of them are designated to observe the Sun: "The Sun Watcher using APS and Image Processing" (SWAP, an EUV imager) and the "Large Yield Radiometer" (LYRA), a radiometer made of diamond photodiodes. The Principal investigator teams of both instruments are hosted at the Royal Observatory of Belgium. This institute will also host the PROBA-2 Science Center from which the SWAP and LYRA instruments will be operated and their data distributed. There are three other instruments to measure basic space plasma properties: the Dual segmented Langmuir probe (DSLP) (developed by the Astronomical Institute and Institute of Atmospheric Physics, Academy of Sciences of the Czech Republic), the Thermal Plasma Measurement Unit (TPMU), and the Science Grade Vector Magnetometer (SGVM) developed by the Technical University of Denmark.

== See also ==
- List of European Space Agency programs and missions
- PROBA-1
- PROBA-V
- PROBA-3
