= Spei Satelles =

Vatican's first satellite

Spei Satelles (SpeiSat)
- Operator: Agenzia Spaziale Italiana
- COSPAR ID: 2023-084-BT
- SATCAT no.: 56991
- Website: https://www.speisatelles.org/en

Spacecraft properties
- Manufacturer: Politecnico di Torino
- Payload mass: 3Kg

Start of mission
- Launch date: June 12, 2023, 21:35:00 UTC
- Rocket: Falcon 9 Block 5
- Launch site: SLC-4E Vandenberg SFB
- Deployed from: ION-SCV 011

Orbital parameters
- Regime: SSO
- Eccentricity: 0.0469
- Periapsis altitude: 470
- Apoapsis altitude: 481
- Inclination: 97.5°
- Period: 7 days

Spei Satelles (or SpeiSat) is the first Vatican satellite, it consists of a 3U cubesat and was launched in 2023 by a Falcon 9 from Vandenberg Space Force Base on a rideshare mission.

The satellite was created by the Politecnico di Torino and promoted by the Dicastery for Communication of the Holy See with coordination from the Italian space agency (ASI).

The mission logo was created by the students and teachers of the IUSVE Salesian University Institute in Venice.

== Payloads ==
SpeiSat hosts 2 on-board computers, a battery, small magnets to stabilize the satellite and 2 UHF transmitters in order to broadcast messages from Pope Francis on a 437.5 MHz frequency.

The satellite also contains a nanobook created by the National Research Council (CNR) with the Holy Father's book in his shell and a file containing messages and images of the 2020 Statio Orbis written in binary due to the small dimensions.

== See also ==
- Religion in space
- Vatican Observatory
- 2023 in spaceflight

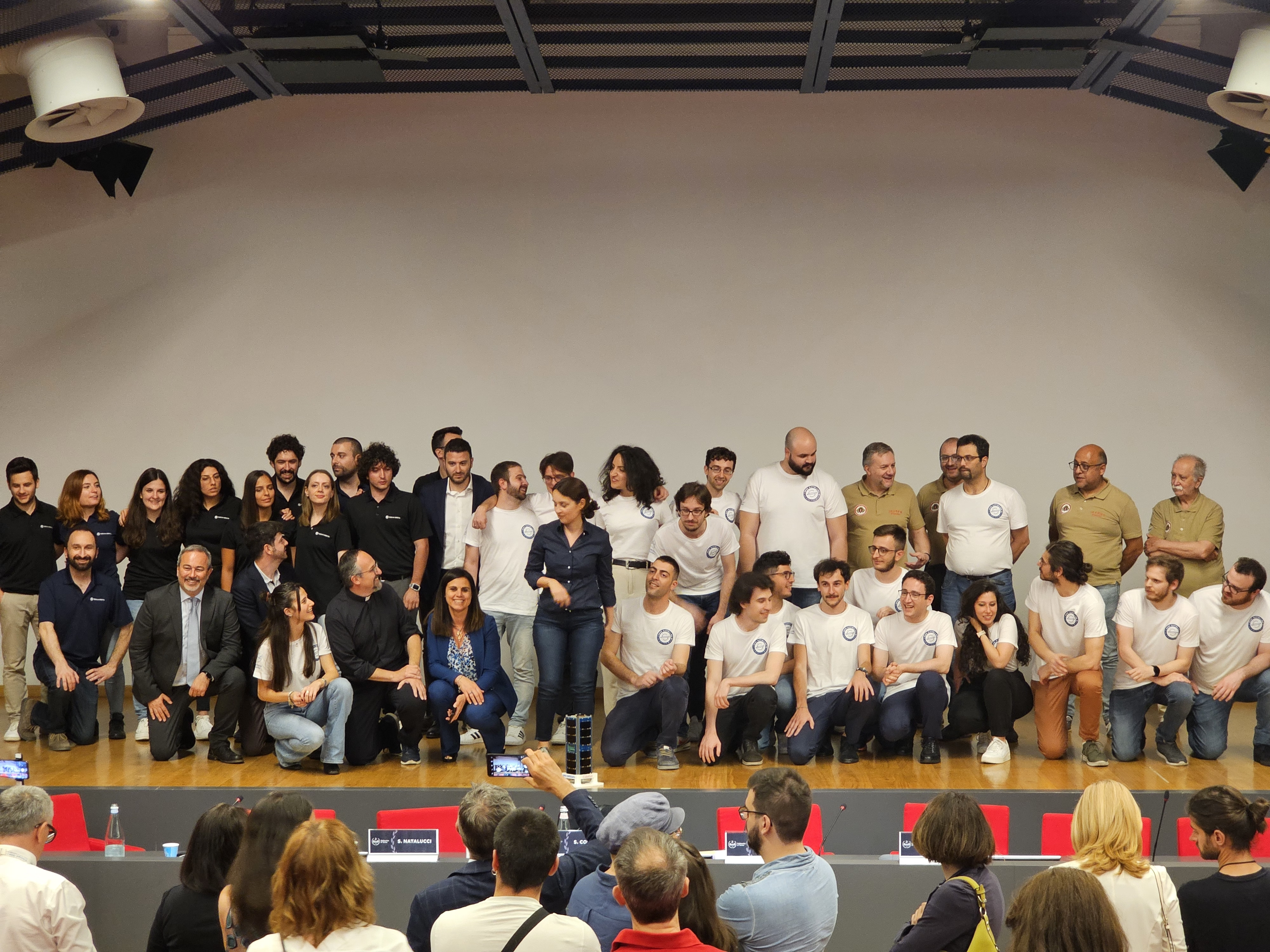
SPEI Satelles Team
