= Lusat =

LUSAT-1, also known as OSCAR-19 and LO-19, was Argentina's 1st satellite and was launched on 22 January 1990. It celebrated its 34th anniversary in 2024.

== Engineering ==
It was built using the AMSAT-NA satellite bus & has an uplink of 45.84–145.90 MHz (FM 1200 bps), a CW Downlink of 437.125 MHz, a Digital Downlink of 437.150 MHz SSB and a downlink of 437.125 MHz (AX.25 protocol), with dimensions of 213 x 230 x 230 mm, and has four solar panels and weighs 13.76 kg. It uses Ni-Cd batteries. It carried a CCD camera for earth photography.

== Orbit ==
It has a perigee of 777 km and an apogee of 793 km.

== See also ==
- CONAE
