= BIRD (satellite) =

German infrared detection satellite

- Mission type: Earth observation
- Operator: DLR
- COSPAR ID: 2001-049C
- SATCAT no.: 26959
- Website: DLR BIRD page
- Mission duration: 1 year, 3 months

Spacecraft properties
- Launch mass: 92 kilograms (203 lb)

Start of mission
- Launch date: 22 October 2001
- Rocket: PSLV-C3
- Launch site: Satish Dhawan FLP

Orbital parameters
- Reference system: Geocentric
- Regime: Low Earth
- Eccentricity: 0.00209
- Perigee altitude: 551 kilometres (342 mi)
- Apogee altitude: 580 kilometres (360 mi)
- Inclination: 97.8 degrees
- Period: 96 minutes
- Epoch: 22 October 2001, 00:53:00 UTC

BIRD (Bispectral and Infrared Remote Detection) is a satellite launched by ISRO in 2001 for DLR. This small (92 kg) boxlike system, with solar panels and two collectors on stub wings, has remarkable fire-detection qualities. It hosts a two-channel infrared sensor system in combination with a Wide-Angle Optoelectronic Stereo Scanner (WAOSS). It also features a neural network classifier in orbit to reduce downlink bandwidth and cost.

The unique combination of a stereo camera and two infrared cameras gives the opportunity to acquire:

- More precise information about leaf mass and photosynthesis is needed for the early diagnosis of vegetation conditions and changes.
- Real-time discrimination between smoke and water clouds

The attitude and control system of the BIRD satellite was reused in the TET-1 satellite.

== Publications ==
A BIRD satellite architecture (in German) (pdf)

O. Maibaum, T. Terzibaschian, "Lessons learned from the Object-Oriented Design of the BIRD Attitude Control System Software", 16th IFAC Symposium on Automatic Control in Aerospace (ACA'2004), ACA'2004 Preprints (Vol.I), S. 156-161, St.Petersburg, 14–18 June 2004

== See also ==
- Miniaturized satellite
- TET-1
