= PearlAfricaSat-1 =

Ugandan Earth observation satellite

- Mission type: Earth observation
- Operator: Government of Uganda

Spacecraft properties
- Manufacturer: Kyushu Institute of Technology

Start of mission
- Launch date: 7 November 2022
- Rocket: Antares (NG-18)
- Launch site: Mid-Atlantic Regional Spaceport
- Deployed from: ISS
- Deployment date: 2 December 2022

End of mission
- Decay date: 2023

Orbital parameters
- Reference system: Geocentric orbit
- Regime: Low Earth orbit

PearlAfricaSat-1 was a 1U CubeSat associated with Uganda's first satellite mission and developed through a collaboration involving the Kyushu Institute of Technology in Japan. It launched on 7 November 2022 aboard the NG-18 Cygnus cargo mission to the International Space Station (ISS) and was deployed into orbit from the ISS on 2 December 2022.

According to news reports, the satellite formed part of Uganda's efforts to develop domestic capacity in space engineering and to use Earth-observation data for applications such as agriculture, environmental monitoring, and disaster planning.

Tracking databases list PearlAfricaSat-1 as having reentered (decayed from orbit) in 2023.

== Background and development ==
PearlAfricaSat-1 was developed through the Joint Global Multi-Nation Birds Project (BIRDS), with Ugandan engineers receiving training and hands-on development experience at Kyushu Institute of Technology.

== Launch and deployment ==
The satellite launched on 7 November 2022 from the Mid-Atlantic Regional Spaceport in Virginia aboard Northrop Grumman’s NG-18 Cygnus resupply mission to the ISS.

Ugandan officials later announced that PearlAfricaSat-1 was deployed into orbit from the ISS on 2 December 2022 and that the country had established communications with the spacecraft.

== Mission ==
PearlAfricaSat-1 was described by media reports as an Earth-observation CubeSat intended to support applications such as monitoring land and environmental conditions relevant to agriculture and resource management.

The satellite carried a multispectral imaging capability intended to help assess land and water conditions.
