= Institute of Atmospheric Physics AS CR =

Czech research institute

- Director: prof. RNDr. Radan Huth, DrSc.
- Address: Boční II/1401, 141 00, Prague 4, Czech Republic
- Website: ufa.cas.cz/

The Institute of Atmospheric Physics AS CR (Czech: Ústav fyziky atmosféry Akademie věd České republiky), also designated as the IAP, is part of the Academy of Sciences of the Czech Republic (AS CR). Within the IAP research institutions are combined in order to cover the whole field of science and humanities.

The IAP was established in 1964, developed from a previously existing institute. This former institute's main focus was observation, and interpretation of data of tropospheric processes. In 1994 another former institute joined the IAP which then extended its research purview to the entire atmosphere, from the boundary layer up to interplanetary space. In 2007-2008 the IAP organized several international workshops and meetings.

The institute is staffed by 111 persons (2008) and forty percent of those hold the PhD degree or its equivalent. Throughout the years staff members have published research in a variety of international and national peer reviewed journals, as well as various books, chapters in books, and monographs. Also, the IAP participates in international research programs, and many international research projects. For example, it participates in the Climate and Weather of the Sun-Earth System (CAWSES) program, and the GEO-6 (Galileo for Scientific User Community) research project.

== Science investigations ==
Scientific investigation for the IAP is defined by the vertical extent of the atmosphere. Types of investigations include theoretical models, numerical simulation, and experiment for the Earth's boundary layer, troposphere, middle atmosphere, ionosphere and magnetosphere.

The main research topic areas currently include mesoscale, dynamical, and applied meteorology. Furthermore, the processes of the atmospheric boundary layer are also of interest. In addition, climate variability and climate change are studied. Other research is conducted that concerns the ozone, along with the previously mentioned ionosphere and magnetosphere. Regarding these upper atmosphere domains, the IAP conducts its own satellite experiments. Other research extends into space plasma physics and solar-terrestrial interactions.

== Department of Climatology ==
The Department of Climatology of the IAP is concerned with two broad research areas. These are climate change research, and statistical climatology.

=== Climate change research ===
Climate change research includes the observation, analysis, and establishing trends regarding the variations of long-term extreme warm and cold temperature phenomena in central and south-eastern Europe. Of note is a prevailing warming trend when analysing both the warm and cold events during the 20th century. Also of note are changes in the atmospheric circulation patterns. Global Circulation Model (GCM) outputs are related to the region of the Czech Republic and central Europe. In addition, this department is developing a Regional Climate Model in conjunction with another Czech institute and Charles University. Included in this departments work are impact assessments by constructing climate change scenarios for selected experimental units in the Czech Republic.

=== Statistical climatology ===
Various validated statistical models and predictors are employed which provide a platform for research in climate change. These include extreme value analysis, non-linear time series analysis, statistical downscaling, and the stochastic weather generator.

=== Research projects ===
The Department of Climatology is involved in research projects listed from starting in 2004 to starting in 2008. Some of the titles are as follows:

==== 2008 ====
- Probabilistic climate scenarios for the Czech Republic.
- Extraterrestrial effects on atmospheric circulation in mid and high latitudes.
- Effect of climate variability and meteorological extremes on the production of selected crops between 1801 and 2007.

==== 2007 ====
- Meteorological causes and human mortality impacts of extreme hot weather in summer: a comparative study.
- Effects of short-term and long-term variability of weather on mortality.

==== 2006 ====
- Central and Eastern Europe Climate Change Impacts and Vulnerability Assessment (CECILIA).
- Climate change impacts on the crop growth and development of selected crops.

== Department of Space Physics ==
This department is Space Plasma Group, which was founded in 1998 as the Department of Space Physics of the Institute of Atmospheric Physics. Primary investigations of this department are space plasma process which occur in solar-terrestrial interactions. Simulated and experimental data are applied in these studies.

== Other departments ==
There are also several other departments, along with five observatories and one detached unit. Notable work from these areas will also be included.

== Organizational structure ==
The IAP has a Director, deputy director, and Scientific Secretary which comprises the institute's Management. The Scientific and professional section is divided into six departments, two of which have been discussed above. Each department has its own department head. The administration is made up of the administrative head, librarian, and Secretary to the Director. There is also a board which lists internal and external seated members. In addition, there is a supervisory board with six members, one of whom functions as secretary.
