= Es'hailSat =

Qatari communications satellite operator

Qatar Satellite Company - Es'hailSat
- Founded: 2010; 16 years ago
- Headquarters: Doha, Qatar
- Key people: Dr. Hessa Al Jaber (chairman); Ali A Al Kuwari (CEO)
- Website: www.eshailsat.qa

Es'hailSat is a Qatar-based communications satellite operator. The company provides direct-to-home television with its satellite, and hopes to provide further television-related services in the future. The company launched the first-ever Qatar satellite – Es'hail 1 – in a collaboration with European satellite operator Eutelsat; Es'hailSat owned a majority stake in the satellite and launch.

== Fleet ==
=== Es'hail 1 ===
Es'hail 1, the first operational satellite in Es'hailSat's fleet, provides services for companies including BeIN Sports and Al Jazeera, who utilized the satellite's bandwidth for broadcasting HD TV. The satellite launched aboard Arianespace's Ariane 5 rocket in late 2014 and serves at the 25.5 degree East longitude.

=== Es'hail 2 ===
Besides Es'hail 1, the company has a second satellite, Es'hail 2, which launched aboard a SpaceX Falcon 9 rocket on November 15, 2018. Es'hail 2 was built by Japan's Mitsubishi Electric company, and operates at 26° East longitude along a geostationary orbit to provide direct-to-home television services in the Middle East and North Africa region.

=== Es'hail-3/Türksat-Biruni ===
In June 2026, Es'hailSat signed a contract with Thales Alenia Space to build its third satellite, Es'hail-3/Türksat-Biruni, which it will share with the Turkish operator Türksat. The Ka-band satellite is to be placed at 50° East, with Türksat providing the orbital rights and frequencies. The project is worth €295 million, and the launch is expected in 2030. Unlike Es'hail 1 and Es'hail 2, which were built mainly for television, the new satellite is intended for communications, such as fixed and mobile connectivity and services for aviation, shipping and the energy industry.
