= SWAP (instrument) =

Space instrument aboard the PROBA2 satellite

Sun Watcher using Active Pixel System Detector and Image Processing
- Alternative names: SWAP
- Related media on Commons

The Sun Watcher using Active Pixel System Detector and Image Processing (SWAP) telescope is a compact extreme-ultraviolet (EUV) imager on board the PROBA-2 mission. SWAP provides images of the solar corona at a temperature of roughly 1 million degrees. the instrument was built upon the heritage of the Extreme ultraviolet Imaging Telescope (EIT) which monitored the solar corona from the Solar and Heliospheric Observatory from 1996 until after the launch of the Solar Dynamics Observatory in 2010.

SWAP's coronal mass ejection (CME) watch program has collected images at an improved image cadence (typically 1 image every few minutes) since the PROBA-2 launch in 2009. These events include EIT waves (global waves propagating across the solar disc from the CME eruption site), EUV dimming regions (transient coronal holes from where the CME has lifted off), filament instabilities (a specific type of flickering during the rise of a filament). SWAP's EUV images of the corona routinely extend beyond 2 solar radii from the surface of the Sun, much further than was thought possible before the mission was launched. This led to the discovery, in 2021 by Seaton et al. using the SUVI instrument on board NOAA's GOES satellite, that the extended solar corona is visible in the extreme-ultraviolet, out to at least 3 solar radii from the center of the Sun.

SWAP was built at the Liège Space Center and is operated from the PROBA-2 Science Center at the Royal Observatory of Belgium.

SWAP has been used to study coronal brightspot dynamics.

== See also ==
- SWAP (New Horizons) (solar wind detector on Pluto flyby probe)
