= PROBA satellite series =

European technology demonstration satellites

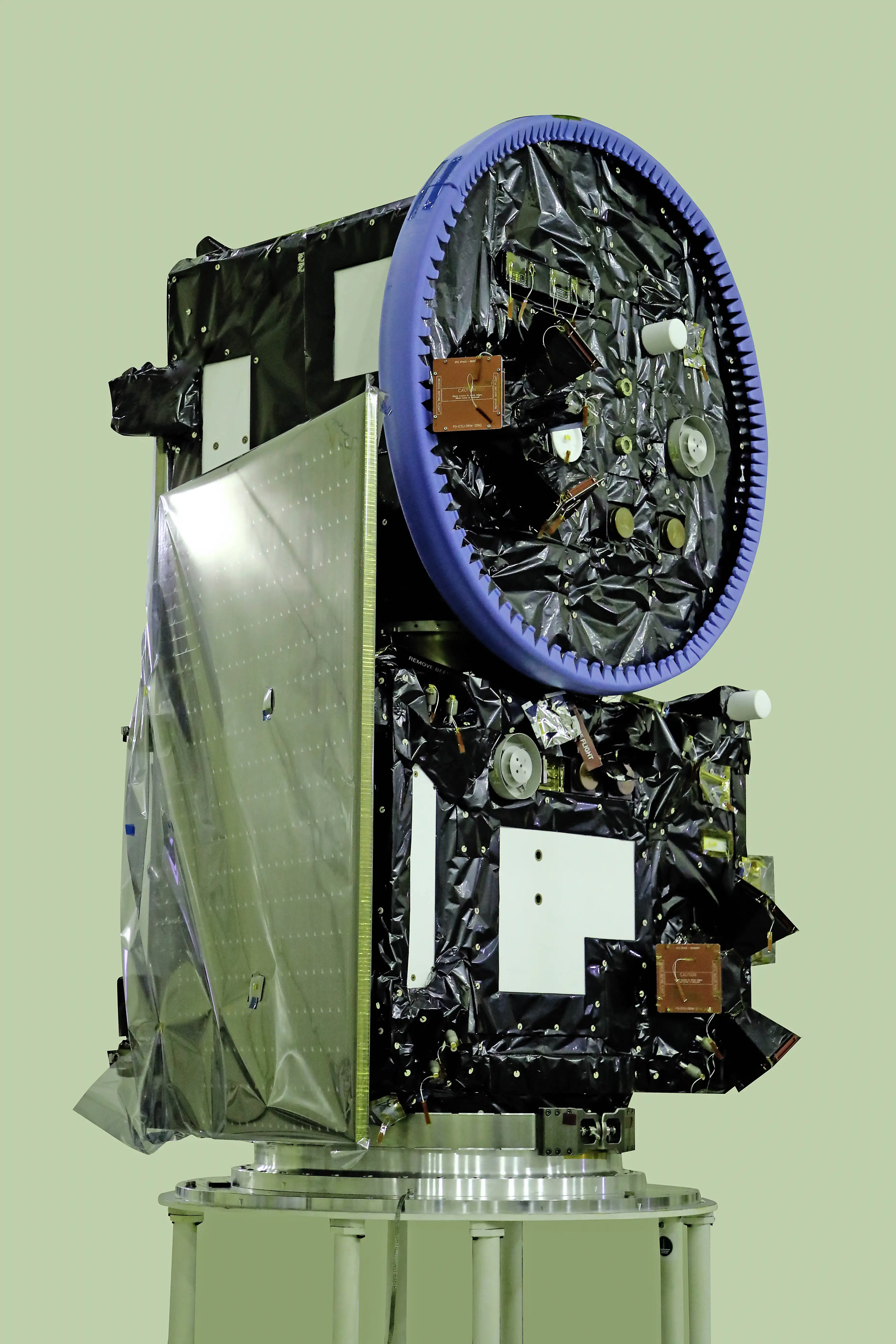
PROBA-3 in cleanroom

Project for On-Board Autonomy (PROBA) is a series of small satellites in low Earth orbit combining technology demonstration with operational roles in Earth observation and astronomy, operated by the European Space Agency (ESA).

All PROBA satellites have been constructed in Belgium. The name is also used to refer to the bus of the satellites. The PROBA missions are funded through the ESA's General Support Technology Programme (GSTP).

== PROBA satellites ==
- PROBA-1 (launched in October 2001) is testing two Earth observation instruments.
- PROBA-2 (launched in November 2009) is testing instruments for Sun observation and space weather monitoring.
- PROBA-V (launched in May 2013) performed daily monitoring of global vegetation growth.
- PROBA-V CubeSat Companion (launched in October 2023) is testing the PROBA-V instrument on a smaller CubeSat platform.
- PROBA-3 (launched in December 2024) is a dual-probe mission testing high-precision formation flying for coronagraphy of the Sun.

== Satellites based on the PROBA bus ==
- ΣYNDEO‑3 (launch planned for 2026) is a technology demonstration satellite for EU.
- ALTIUS (launch planned for 2027) will monitor stratospheric ozone.

== See also ==
- List of European Space Agency programs and missions
- Jason satellite series
