= German Space Operations Center =

Mission control center of German Aerospace Center

Coordinates: 48.087453°N 11.281474°E

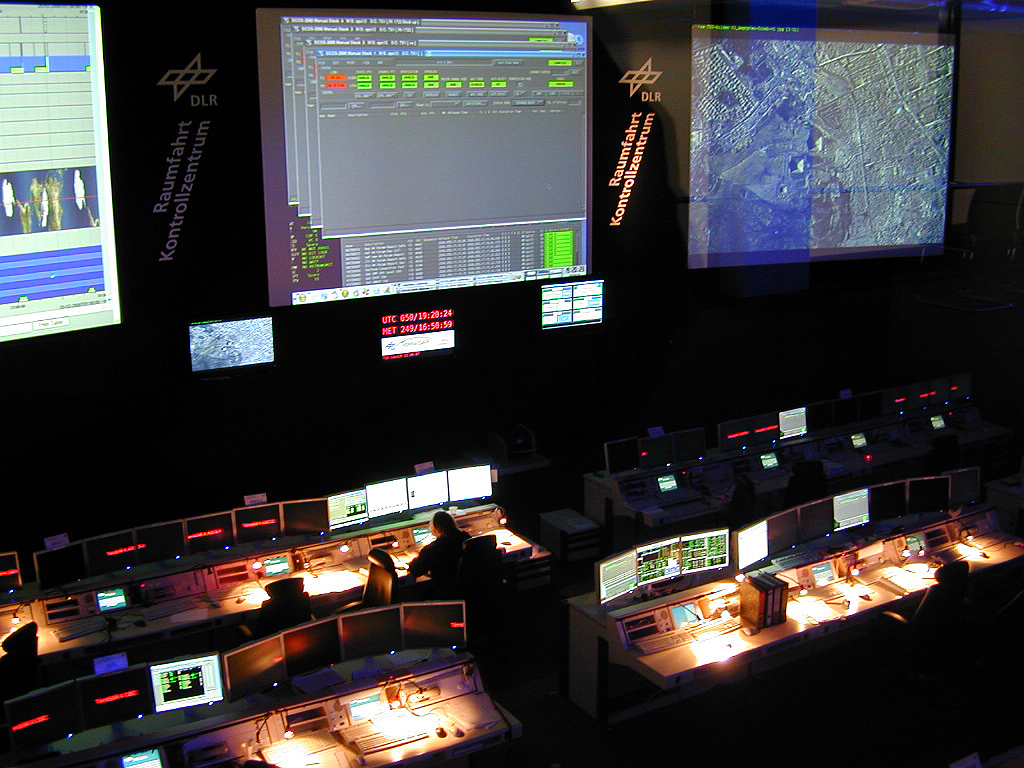
View of the German Space Operations Center

The German Space Operations Center (GSOC; German: Deutsches Raumfahrt-Kontrollzentrum) is the mission control center of German Aerospace Center (DLR) in Oberpfaffenhofen near Munich, Germany.

== Tasks ==
The GSOC performs the following tasks in national and international spaceflight:

- Operation of scientific satellites
- Operation of commercial satellites
- Operation of human spaceflight
- Expansion and operation of the communication infrastructure
- Research and development of new technologies in the field of space operations

== History ==
After the Federal Republic of Germany decided in the 1960s to launch a national space program and to participate in international space projects, the idea of having its own space control center became concrete. In 1967, then Federal Minister of Finance Franz Josef Strauss laid the foundation stone for the first building complex, which was opened a little later.

Until 1985, the Oberpfaffenhofen site of the then German Aerospace Research and Testing Institute (DFVLR) increasingly concentrated on spaceflight. The human spaceflight received special attention. The GSOC then accompanied two crewed missions: During STS-61-A in 1985, GSOC took over the control of the Spacelab, while flight control continued from NASA's Lyndon B. Johnson Space Center was acquired. For the first time, the Payload Operation Control Center (POCC) of a US space mission was directed outside of NASA. For the first time, a human spaceflight was partially monitored from outside the USA or the Soviet Union. During this mission, then Bavarian Prime Minister Franz Josef Strauss announced on 5 November 1985 an extensive investment program with which the role of Oberpfaffenhofen in European spaceflight should be increased.

The failure of Ariane 3 in 1985 and the Challenger disaster in 1986 slowed the development of the Oberpfaffenhofen and the GSOC. The investment program gave the GSOC a new building, Building 140. Construction began in April 1989.

In 1993, GSOC accompanied the entire operation with STS-55 and had full payload control via the Spacelab. This was the first time that there was unfiltered access to all data.

== Missions operated by GSOC ==
=== Crewed missions ===
Mission	Year
STS-9	1983
STS-61-A (Deutschland-1)	1985
Soyuz TM-14	1992
STS-55 (Deutschland-2)	1993
STS-59	1994
Soyuz TM-22	1995
Soyuz TM-25	1997
STS-99	2000
STS-122	2008
ISS-Columbus	2008
ISS ATV-1	2008
ISS-ATV 2	2011
ISS-ATV 3	2012
ISS-ATV 4	2013
ISS-ATV 5	2014
Blue Dot “Alexander Gerst”	2014
Horizons “Alexander Gerst”	2018
Alpha „Thomas Pesquet“	2021

=== Earth Observation and Science ===
Mission	Year
Azur	1969
AEROS-A	1972
AEROS-B	1974
HELIOS-1	1974
HELIOS-2	1976
AMPTE	1984
Galileo	1989
ROSAT	1990
EXPRESS	1995
MARS 96	1996
Equator-S	1997
ABRIXAS	1999
CHAMP	2000
BIRD	2001
GRACE 1 + 2	2002
Rosetta / Philae	2004
SAR-Lupe 1	2006
SAR-Lupe 2	2007
SAR-Lupe 3	2007
SAR-Lupe 4	2008
SAR-Lupe 5	2008
TerraSAR-X	2007
PRISMA	2010
TanDEM-X	2010
TET-1	2012
MASCOT	2014
BIROS (FireBird)	2016
PAZ	2018
GRACE Follow-on (1+2)	2018
HP³ on Insight	2018
Eu_CROPIS	2018
EnMAP	2022

=== Communication and Navigation ===
Mission	Year
Symphonie A	1974
Symphonie B	1975
TV-SAT 1	1987
TV-SAT 2	1989
DFS Kopernikus 1	1989
DFS Kopernikus 2	1990
DFS Kopernikus 3	1992
Eutelsat II-F1	1990
Eutelsat II-F2	1991
Eutelsat II-F3	1991
Eutelsat II-F4	1992
Eutelsat II-F5	1994
Eutelsat II-F6 / HB1	1995
Eutelsat W2	1998
Eutelsat W3	1999
Eutelsat W4	2000
Eutelsat W1R	2001
Eutelsat HB6	2002
Galileo GIOVE-B	2008
COMSATBw 1	2009
COMSATBw 2	2010
Alphasat TDP1	2013
EDRS-A	2016
Small GEO HAG-1	2017
EDRS-C	2019

== See also ==
- German space programme
