= PRISMA =

PRISMA may refer to:

- Preferred Reporting Items for Systematic Reviews and Meta-Analyses, an academic reporting standard
- PRISMA (spacecraft), an Italian Space Agency mission
