= HySIS =

Earth observation satellite

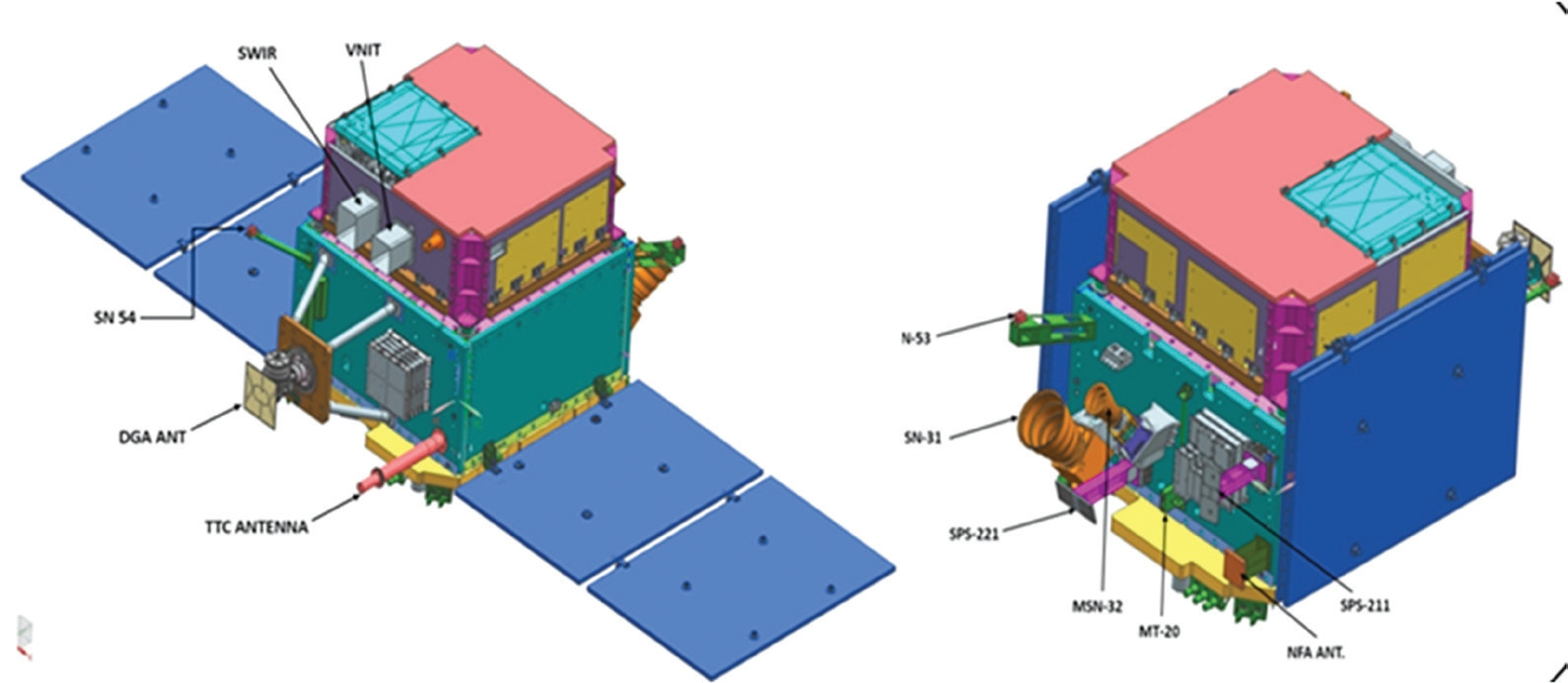
- Render of HySIS
- Operator: ISRO
- COSPAR ID: 2018-096A
- SATCAT no.: 43719
- Mission duration: Planned: 5 years Elapsed: 7 years, 1 month, 10 days

Spacecraft properties
- Bus: IMS-2
- Launch mass: 380 kilograms (840 lb)
- Dimensions: 2.158 × 1.387 × 1.157 meters (Stowed)

Start of mission
- Launch date: 29 November 2018, 04:27:30 UTC
- Rocket: PSLV-C43
- Launch site: Satish Dhawan Space Centre

Orbital parameters
- Reference system: Geocentric
- Regime: SSO
- Inclination: 97.95°
- Period: 97 minutes 26 seconds
- Repeat interval: 133 orbits

HySIS (Hyperspectral Imaging Satellite) is an Earth observation satellite which will provide hyperspectral imaging services to India for a range of applications in agriculture, forestry and in the assessment of geography such as coastal zones and inland waterways The data will also be accessible to India's defence forces.

Before HySIS, other Indian hyperspectral imaging payloads were HySI (Hyper Spectral Imager) on IMS-1 and Chandrayaan-1 and LiVHySI (Limb Viewing Hyper Spectral Imager) on YouthSat.

== Payloads ==
HySIS carries two payloads, the first is the Visible Near Infrared (VNIR) with spectral range of 0.4 to 0.95 micrometres with 60 contiguous spectral bands and the second is the Shortwave Infrared Range (SWIR) with spectral range of 0.85 to 2.4 micrometres with a 10 nanometre bandwidth and 256 contiguous spectral bands. The satellite will have a spatial resolution of 30 metres and a swath of 30 km from its 630 km Sun-synchronous orbit. Space Applications Centre and Semi-Conductor Laboratory were responsible for the development and fabrication of the 'Frame Transfer CCD' for the VNIR imaging payload while ISRO Satellite Centre supplied the modified IMS-2 bus and carried out the final assembly, integration and testing.

== Launch ==
PSLV-C43 carrying HySIS and 30 secondary payloads was launched at 04:27:30 UTC, 29 November 2018 from First Launch Pad of Satish Dhawan Space Centre. After a flight that lasted 17 minutes and 19 seconds, HySIS was successfully placed in a planned Sun-synchronous polar orbit at around 645 km.

== See also ==
- Indian military satellites
- EnMAP
- PRISMA
- Integrated Space Cell
- HICO
- Space based survelliance project
