= 2001 in spaceflight =

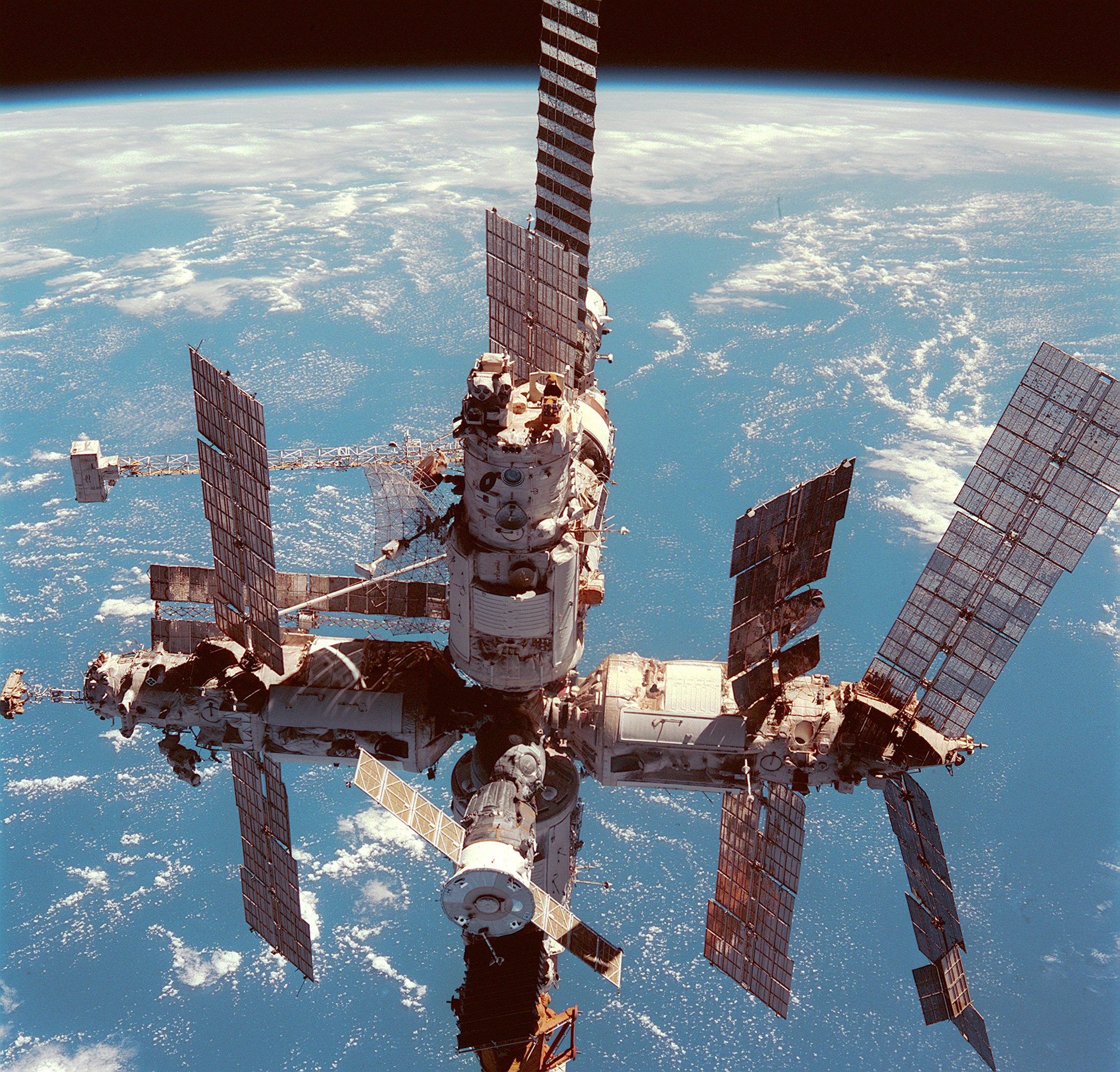
- The Mir space station, which was deorbited on 23 March

Orbital launches
- First: 9 January
- Last: 28 December
- Total: 59
- Successes: 58
- Failures: 1
- Catalogued: 58

Rockets
- Maiden flights: GSLV; H-IIA 202; Proton-M; Soyuz-FG
- Retirements: Ariane 4 44P; Ariane 4 44LP; Athena I

Crewed flights
- Orbital: 8
- Total travellers: 44

2001 in spaceflight

This article outlines notable events occurring in 2001 in spaceflight, including major launches and EVAs.

== Deorbit of Mir ==
The Russian space station Mir ended its mission on 23 March 2001, when it was brought out of its orbit, entered the atmosphere and was destroyed. Major components ranged from about 5 to 15 years in age, and included the Mir Core Module, Kvant-1, Kvant-2, Kristall, Spektr, Priroda, and Docking Module. Although Russia was optimistic about Mir's future, the country's commitments to the International Space Station programme left no funding to support Mir.

== Launches ==
- ← Jan
- Feb
- Mar
- Apr
- May
- Jun
- Jul
- Aug
- Sep
- Oct
- Nov
- Dec →

Date and time (UTC)	Rocket	Flight number	Launch site		LSP	
Date and time (UTC)	Payload (⚀ = CubeSat)	Operator	Orbit	Function	Decay (UTC)	Outcome
Date and time (UTC)	Remarks					
=== January ===
9 January; 17:00	(China) Long March 2F		(China) Jiuquan		(China)	
9 January; 17:00	(China) Shenzhou 2	CMSA	Low Earth	Test spacecraft	16 January; 11:22	Successful
9 January; 17:00	(China) Shenzhou spacecraft orbital module	CMSA	Low Earth	Test spacecraft	24 August; 09:05	Successful
10 January; 22:09	(France) Ariane 4 44P		(France) Kourou ELA-2		(France) Arianespace	
10 January; 22:09	(Turkey) Türksat 2A	Eurasiasat SAM	Geosynchronous	Communications	In orbit	Operational
24 January; 04:28	(Russia) Soyuz-U		(Kazakhstan) Baikonur Site 1/5		(Russia) Roskosmos	
24 January; 04:28	(Russia) Progress M1-5	Roskosmos	Low Earth (Mir)	Deorbit Mir	23 March; 05:50	Successful
24 January; 04:28	Final spacecraft to dock with the Mir space station. Remained docked during re-entry.					
30 January; 07:55	(United States) Delta II 7925-9.5		(United States) Cape Canaveral SLC-17A		(United States) Boeing IDS	
30 January; 07:55	(United States) GPS IIR-7 (USA-156)	US Air Force	Medium Earth	Navigation	In orbit	Operational
=== February ===
7 February; 23:05	(France) Ariane 4 44L		(France) Kourou ELA-2		(France) Arianespace	
7 February; 23:05	Sicral		Geostationary	Communications	In orbit	Operational
7 February; 23:05	(United Kingdom) Skynet 4F	MoD (UK)	Geostationary	Communications	In orbit	Operational
7 February; 23:05	Skynet 4F is the final ECS-class satellite.					
7 February; 23:13	(United States) Space Shuttle Atlantis		(United States) Kennedy LC-39A		(United States) United Space Alliance	
7 February; 23:13	(United States) STS-98	NASA	Low Earth (ISS)	ISS assembly	20 February; 20:33	Successful
7 February; 23:13	(United Nations) Destiny	NASA	Low Earth (ISS)	ISS component	In orbit	Operational
7 February; 23:13	Crewed orbital flight with 5 astronauts					
20 February; 08:48	(Russia) Start-1		(Russia) Svobodniy Site 5		(Russia)	
20 February; 08:48	(Sweden) Odin	SSC	Low Earth	Infrared astronomy	In orbit	Operational
26 February; 08:09	(Russia) Soyuz-U		(Kazakhstan) Baikonur Site 1/5		(Russia) Roskosmos	
26 February; 08:09	(Russia) Progress M-44	Roskosmos	Low Earth (ISS)	Logistics	16 April; 13:23	Successful
26 February; 08:09	ISS flight 3P					
27 February; 21:20	(United States) Titan IVB (401)/Centaur		(United States) Cape Canaveral SLC-40		(United States) Lockheed Martin	
27 February; 21:20	(United States) Milstar 2 (USA-157)	US Air Force	Geosynchronous	Communications	In orbit	Operational
=== March ===
8 March; 11:42	(United States) Space Shuttle Discovery		(United States) Kennedy LC-39B		(United States) United Space Alliance	
8 March; 11:42	(United States) STS-102	NASA	Low Earth (ISS)	ISS assembly	21 March; 07:31	Successful
8 March; 11:42	(Italy) (United States) Leonardo MPLM	ASI/NASA	Low Earth (ISS)	Logistics	21 March; 07:31	Successful
8 March; 11:42	Crewed orbital flight with 7 astronauts, ISS crew exchange (launched Expedition 2); Maiden flight of Multi-Purpose Logistics Module					
8 March; 22:51	(France) Ariane 5G		(France) Kourou ELA-3		(France) Arianespace	
8 March; 22:51	(France) Eurobird	Eutelsat	Geosynchronous	Communications	In orbit	Operational
8 March; 22:51	(Japan) BSAT-2A	BSAT	Geosynchronous	Communications	In orbit	Operational
18 March; 22:33	(Ukraine) Zenit-3SL		(Norway) Ocean Odyssey		(United Nations) Sea Launch	
18 March; 22:33	(United States) XM-2 "Rock"	XM Satellite Radio	Geosynchronous	Communications	In orbit	Partial satellite failure
18 March; 22:33	Design fault with solar panels led to shorter operational life, deactivated November 2006					
=== April ===
7 April; 03:47	(Russia) Proton-M/Briz-M		(Kazakhstan) Baikonur Site 81/24		(Russia)	
7 April; 03:47	(Russia) Ekran-M 18	GPKS	Geosynchronous	Communications	In orbit	Operational
7 April; 03:47	Maiden flight of Proton-M					
7 April; 15:02	(United States) Delta II 7925-9.5		(United States) Cape Canaveral SLC-17A		(United States) Boeing IDS	
7 April; 15:02	(United States) 2001 Mars Odyssey	NASA	Areocentric	Mars orbiter	In orbit	Operational
18 April; 10:13	(India) GSLV		(India) Satish Dhawan FLP		(India) ISRO	
18 April; 10:13	(India) GSAT-1	ISRO	Geosynchronous	Communications	In orbit	Failure
18 April; 10:13	Payload placed in incorrect orbit due to underpowered upper stage of launch vehicle Maiden flight of GSLV					
19 April; 18:40	(United States) Space Shuttle Endeavour		(United States) Kennedy LC-39A		(United States) United Space Alliance	
19 April; 18:40	(United States) STS-100	NASA	Low Earth (ISS)	ISS assembly	1 May; 16:10	Successful
19 April; 18:40	(Italy) (United States) Raffaello MPLM	ASI/NASA	Low Earth (ISS)	Logistics	1 May; 16:10	Successful
19 April; 18:40	(Canada) Canadarm2	NASA	Low Earth (ISS)	ISS component	In orbit	Operational
19 April; 18:40	Crewed orbital flight with 7 astronauts					
28 April; 07:37	(Russia) Soyuz-U		(Kazakhstan) Baikonur Site 1/5		(Russia) Roskosmos	
28 April; 07:37	(Russia) Soyuz TM-32	Roskosmos	Low Earth (ISS)	ISS escape craft	31 October	Successful
28 April; 07:37	Crewed orbital flight with three cosmonauts including the first space tourist, whose flight was arranged by the American company Space Adventures					
=== May ===
8 May; 22:10	(Ukraine) Zenit-3SL		(Norway) Ocean Odyssey		(United Nations) Sea Launch	
8 May; 22:10	(United States) XM-1 "Roll"	XM Satellite Radio	Geosynchronous	Communications	In orbit	Partial satellite failure
8 May; 22:10	Design fault with solar panels led to shorter operational life, deactivated November 2006					
15 May; 01:11	(Russia) Proton-K/DM-2M		(Kazakhstan) Baikonur Site 81/23		(Russia) (United States) International Launch Services	
15 May; 01:11	(United States) Panamsat 10	PanAmSat	Geosynchronous	Communications	In orbit	Operational
18 May; 17:45	(United States) Delta II 7925-9.5		(United States) Cape Canaveral SLC-17B		(United States) Boeing IDS	
18 May; 17:45	(United States) GeoLITE (USA-158)	NRO	Geostationary	Experimental communications	In orbit	Operational
18 May; 17:45	NROL-17 Mission.					
20 May; 22:32	(Russia) Soyuz-FG		(Kazakhstan) Baikonur Site 1/5		(Russia) Roskosmos	
20 May; 22:32	(Russia) Progress M1-6	Roskosmos	Low Earth (ISS)	Logistics	22 August	Successful
20 May; 22:32	Maiden flight of Soyuz-FG; ISS flight 4P					
29 May; 17:55	(Russia) Soyuz-U		(Russia) Plesetsk Site 43/4		(Russia) VKS	
29 May; 17:55	(Russia) Kosmos 2377	MO RF	Low Earth	Reconnaissance	10 October	Successful
=== June ===
8 June; 15:08	(Russia) Kosmos-3M		(Russia) Plesetsk Site 132		(Russia) VKS	
8 June; 15:08	(Russia) Kosmos 2378	MO RF	Low Earth	Navigation	In orbit	Operational
9 June; 06:45	(France) Ariane 4 44L		(France) Kourou ELA-2		(France) Arianespace	
9 June; 06:45	(United Nations) Intelsat 901	Intelsat	Geosynchronous	Communications	In orbit	Operational
16 June; 01:49	(Russia) Proton-K/DM-2M		(Kazakhstan) Baikonur Site 81/23		(Russia) (United States) International Launch Services	
16 June; 01:49	(Luxembourg) Astra 2C	SES Astra	Geosynchronous	Communications	In orbit	Operational
19 June; 04:41	(United States) Atlas IIAS		(United States) Cape Canaveral SLC-36B		(Russia) (United States) International Launch Services	
19 June; 04:41	(United States) ICO F2	ICO	Medium Earth	Communications	In orbit	Operational
30 June; 17:45	(United States) Delta II 7425-10		(United States) Cape Canaveral SLC-17B		(United States) Boeing IDS	
30 June; 17:45	(United States) WMAP	NASA	Earth-Sun L_{2} Lagrange Point	Astronomy	In orbit	Successful
30 June; 17:45	Ceased operations on 20 August 2010, subsequently manoeuvred into heliocentric orbit on 8 September					
=== July ===
12 July; 09:03	(United States) Space Shuttle Atlantis		(United States) Kennedy LC-39B		(United States) United Space Alliance	
12 July; 09:03	(United States) STS-104	NASA	Low Earth (ISS)	ISS assembly	25 July; 03:38	Successful
12 July; 09:03	(United Nations) Quest	NASA	Low Earth	ISS component	In orbit	Operational
12 July; 09:03	Crewed orbital flight with five astronauts					
12 July; 21:58	(France) Ariane 5G		(France) Kourou ELA-3		(France) Arianespace	
12 July; 21:58	Artemis	ESA	Geosynchronous	Navigation	In orbit	Partial launch failure Operational
12 July; 21:58	(Japan) BSAT-2B	BSAT	Intended: Geosynchronous; Achieved: Medium Earth	Communications	28 January 2014	Launch failure
12 July; 21:58	Premature cutoff of 2nd stage. Artemis reached correct orbit under own power, BSAT abandoned in useless orbit					
20 July; 00:17	(Russia) Molniya-M		(Russia) Plesetsk Site 43/4		(Russia) VKS	
20 July; 00:17	(Russia) Molniya 3–51	MO RF	Molniya	Communications	19 December 2016	Successful
23 July; 07:23	(United States) Atlas IIA		(United States) Cape Canaveral SLC-36A			
23 July; 07:23	(United States) GOES-12 (GOES-M)	NOAA	Geosynchronous	Weather satellite	In orbit	Operational
31 July; 08:00	(Ukraine) Tsyklon-3		(Russia) Plesetsk Site 32/2		(Russia) VKS	
31 July; 08:00	(Russia) Koronas F	RAKA	Sun-synchronous	Solar observation	6 December 2005	Successful
=== August ===
6 August; 07:28	(United States) Titan IVB (402)/IUS		(United States) Cape Canaveral SLC-40		(United States) Lockheed Martin	
6 August; 07:28	(United States) DSP-21 (USA-159)	US Air Force	Geosynchronous	Missile early warning	In orbit	Operational
8 August; 16:13	(United States) Delta II 7326-9.5		(United States) Cape Canaveral SLC-17A		(United States) Boeing IDS	
8 August; 16:13	(United States) Genesis	NASA	Earth-Sun L_{1} Lagrange Point	Solar wind sample return	8 September 2004	Partial failure
8 August; 16:13	Parachute failed to deploy upon return to Earth, some samples recovered from wreckage					
10 August; 21:10	(United States) Space Shuttle Discovery		(United States) Kennedy LC-39A		(United States) United Space Alliance	
10 August; 21:10	(United States) STS-105	NASA	Low Earth (ISS)	ISS assembly	22 August; 03:38	Successful
10 August; 21:10	(Italy) (United States) Leonardo MPLM	ASI/NASA	Low Earth (ISS)	Logistics	22 August; 03:38	Successful
10 August; 21:10	(United States) Simplesat	NASA	Low Earth	Astronomy	30 January 2002	Failure
10 August; 21:10	Crewed orbital flight with seven astronauts ISS crew exchange (launched Expedition 3); Simplesat released 20 August 18:30 UTC, and failed to contact ground					
21 August; 09:23	(Russia) Soyuz-U		(Kazakhstan) Baikonur Site 1/5		(Russia) Roskosmos	
21 August; 09:23	(Russia) Progress M-45	Roskosmos	Low Earth (ISS)	Logistics	22 November	Successful
21 August; 09:23	ISS flight 5P					
24 August; 20:35	(Russia) Proton-K/DM-2		(Kazakhstan) Baikonur Site 81/24		(Russia) VKS	
24 August; 20:35	(Russia) Kosmos 2379	VKS	Geosynchronous	Early warning	In orbit	Operational
29 August; 07:00	(Japan) H-IIA 202		(Japan) Tanegashima LA-Y1		(Japan)	
29 August; 07:00	(Japan) LRE	NASDA	Geostationary transfer	Orbit determination	In orbit	Successful
29 August; 07:00	(Japan) VEP-2	NASDA	Geostationary transfer	Boilerplate spacecraft	In orbit	Successful
29 August; 07:00	Maiden flight of H-IIA					
30 August; 06:46	(France) Ariane 4 44L		(France) Kourou ELA-2		(France) Arianespace	
30 August; 06:46	(United Nations) Intelsat 902	Intelsat	Geosynchronous	Communications	In orbit	Operational
=== September ===
8 September; 15:25	(United States) Atlas IIAS		(United States) Vandenberg SLC-3E		Lockheed Martin	
8 September; 15:25	(United States) NOSS C1-1 (USA-160)	NRO	Low Earth	SIGINT	In orbit	Operational
8 September; 15:25	(United States) NOSS C1-1 (USA-160-2)	NRO	Low Earth	SIGINT	In orbit	Operational
14 September; 23:34	(Russia) Soyuz-U		(Kazakhstan) Baikonur Site 1/5		(Russia) Roscosmos	
14 September; 23:34	(Russia) Progress M-SO1	Roscosmos	Low Earth (ISS)	Space tug / ISS assembly	26 September	Successful
14 September; 23:34	(Russia) Pirs	Roscosmos	Low Earth (ISS)	ISS component	26 July 2021; 14:51	Successful
14 September; 23:34	ISS flight 4R					
21 September; 18:49	(United States) Taurus 2110		(United States) Vandenberg LC-576E		(United States) Orbital Sciences	
21 September; 18:49	(United States) Orbview-4	OrbImage	Intended: Low Earth (SSO)	Earth observation	21 September	Launch failure
21 September; 18:49	(United States) QuikTOMS	NASA	Intended: Low Earth (SSO)	Ozone observation	21 September	Launch failure
21 September; 18:49	(United States) SBD / Celestis-4	Orbital Sciences / Celestis	Intended: Low Earth (SSO)	Technology demonstration / Space burial	21 September	Launch failure
21 September; 18:49	Failed to reach orbit after control issues. SBD and Celestis-4 were hosted payloads on the third stage.					
25 September; 23:21	(France) Ariane 4 44P		(France) Kourou ELA-2		(France) Arianespace	
25 September; 23:21	(France) Atlantic Bird 2	Eutelsat	Geosynchronous	Communications	In orbit	Operational
25 September; 23:21	Final flight of Ariane 4 44P.					
30 September; 02:40	(United States) Athena I		(United States) Kodiak LP-1		(United States) Lockheed Martin	
30 September; 02:40	(United States) Starshine 3	NASA	Low Earth	Laser ranging	21 January 2003	Successful
30 September; 02:40	(United States) Picosat 9	U.S. Air Force	Low Earth	Technology demonstration	In orbit	Successful
30 September; 02:40	(United States) PCSat	U.S. Air Force	Low Earth	Communications	In orbit	Operational
30 September; 02:40	(United States) SAPPHIRE	Stanford University	Low Earth	Education	In orbit	Successful
30 September; 02:40	Kodiak Star, Space Test Program mission. Final flight of Athena I, and at the time final flight of the Athena family, which was later reactivated. First orbital launch from Kodiak Island.					
=== October ===
5 October; 21:21	(United States) Titan IVB (404)		(United States) Vandenberg SLC-4E		(United States) Lockheed Martin	
5 October; 21:21	(United States) EIS-2 (USA-161)	NRO	Sun-synchronous	Reconnaissance	In orbit	Operational
6 October; 16:45	(Russia) Proton-K/DM-2		(Kazakhstan) Baikonur Site 81		(Russia) VKS	
6 October; 16:45	(Russia) Raduga-1	VKS	Geosynchronous	Communications	In orbit	Operational
11 October; 02:32	(United States) Atlas IIAS		(United States) Cape Canaveral SLC-36B			
11 October; 02:32	(United States) Aquila (USA-162)	NRO	Geosynchronous	Communications	In orbit	Operational
18 October; 18:51	(United States) Delta II 7320-10		(United States) Vandenberg SLC-2W		(United States) Boeing IDS	
18 October; 18:51	(United States) QuickBird 2	DigitalGlobe	Low Earth	Earth observation	27 January 2015	Successful
21 October; 08:59	(Russia) Soyuz-U		(Kazakhstan) Baikonur Site 1/5		(Russia) Roskosmos	
21 October; 08:59	(Russia) Soyuz TM-33	Roskosmos	Low Earth (ISS)	ISS escape craft	5 May 2002; 03:52	Successful
21 October; 08:59	Crewed orbital flight with three cosmonauts					
22 October; 04:53	(India) PSLV		(India) Satish Dhawan FLP		(India) ISRO	
22 October; 04:53	(India) TES	ISRO	Low Earth	Reconnaissance	In orbit	Operational
22 October; 04:53	PROBA	ESA	Low Earth	Technology demonstration	In orbit	Operational
22 October; 04:53	(Germany) BIRD	DLR	Low Earth	Earth imaging	In orbit	Operational
25 October; 11:34	(Russia) Molniya-M		(Russia) Plesetsk Site 43/3		(Russia) VKS	
25 October; 11:34	(Russia) Molniya 3–52	VKS	Molniya	Communications	6 December 2011	Successful
=== November ===
26 November; 18:24	(Russia) Soyuz-FG		(Kazakhstan) Baikonur Site 1/5		(Russia) Roskosmos	
26 November; 18:24	(Russia) Progress M1-7	Roskosmos	Low Earth (ISS)	Logistics	20 March 2002	Successful
26 November; 18:24	(Russia) Kolibri	RAKA	Low Earth	Technology demonstration	4 May 2002	Successful
26 November; 18:24	ISS flight 6P; Kolibri deployed from Progress on 19 March 2002					
27 November; 00:35	(France) Ariane 4 44LP		(France) Kourou ELA-2		(France) Arianespace	
27 November; 00:35	(United States) DirecTV-4S	DirecTV	Geosynchronous	Communications	In orbit	Operational
27 November; 00:35	Final flight of Ariane 4 44LP					
=== December ===
1 December; 18:04	(Russia) Proton-K/DM-2		(Kazakhstan) Baikonur		(Russia) VKS	
1 December; 18:04	(Russia) Kosmos 2382 (GLONASS)	KNITs	Medium Earth	Navigation	In orbit	Operational
1 December; 18:04	(Russia) Kosmos 2383 (GLONASS)	KNITs	Medium Earth	Navigation	In orbit	Operational
1 December; 18:04	(Russia) Kosmos 2384 (GLONASS)	KNITs	Medium Earth	Navigation	In orbit	Operational
5 December; 22:19	(United States) Space Shuttle Endeavour		(United States) Kennedy LC-39B		(United States) United Space Alliance	
5 December; 22:19	(United States) STS-108	NASA	Low Earth (ISS)	ISS assembly	17 December; 17:55	Successful
5 December; 22:19	(Italy) (United States) Raffaello MPLM	ASI/NASA	Low Earth (ISS)	Logistics	17 December; 17:55	Successful
5 December; 22:19	(United States) Starshine 2	NASA	Low Earth	Technology demonstration	26 April 2002	Successful
5 December; 22:19	Crewed orbital flight with seven astronauts ISS crew exchange (launched Expedition 4); Starshine 2 released 16 December, 15:02 UTC					
7 December; 15:07	(United States) Delta II 7920-10		(United States) Vandenberg SLC-2W		(United States) Boeing IDS	
7 December; 15:07	(France) (United States) Jason 1	CNES/NASA	Low Earth	Oceanography	In orbit	Operational
7 December; 15:07	(United States) TIMED	NASA	Low Earth	Solar research	In orbit	Operational
10 December; 17:18	(Ukraine) Zenit-2		(Kazakhstan) Baikonur Site 45/1			
10 December; 17:18	(Russia) Meteor 3M-1	Rosaviakosmos	Low Earth	Weather satellite	In orbit	Operational
10 December; 17:18	Kompas	IZMIRAN	Low Earth	Earthquake prediction	In orbit	Operational
10 December; 17:18	(Pakistan) Badr-B	SUPARCO	Low Earth	Earth imaging	In orbit	Partially Successful
10 December; 17:18	(Morocco) (Germany) Maroc-Tubsat	Centre Royal de Teledetection Spatiale/TU Berlin	Low Earth	Earth imaging/Communications	In orbit	Operational
10 December; 17:18	(Russia) (United States) Reflector	Rosaviakosmos/US Air Force	Low Earth	Space debris research	In orbit	Operational
21 December; 04:00	(Ukraine) Tsyklon-2		(Kazakhstan) Baikonur Site 90/20			
21 December; 04:00	(Russia) Kosmos 2383 (US-PM)	Russian Navy	Low Earth	Reconnaissance	20 March 2004; 18:54	Successful
28 December; 03:24	(Ukraine) Tsyklon-3		(Russia) Plesetsk Site 32/2		(Russia) VKS	
28 December; 03:24	(Russia) Kosmos 2384 (Strela)	VKS	Low Earth	Communications	In orbit	Operational
28 December; 03:24	(Russia) Kosmos 2385 (Strela)	VKS	Low Earth	Communications	In orbit	Operational
28 December; 03:24	(Russia) Kosmos 2386 (Strela)	VKS	Low Earth	Communications	In orbit	Operational
28 December; 03:24	(Russia) Gonets D1-10 (Gonets)	VKS	Low Earth	Communications	In orbit	Operational
28 December; 03:24	(Russia) Gonets D1-11 (Gonets)	VKS	Low Earth	Communications	In orbit	Operational
28 December; 03:24	(Russia) Gonets D1-12 (Gonets)	VKS	Low Earth	Communications	In orbit	Operational

- ← Jan
- Feb
- Mar
- Apr
- May
- Jun
- Jul
- Aug
- Sep
- Oct
- Nov
- Dec →

== Suborbital launches ==
- ← Jan
- Feb
- Mar
- Apr
- May
- Jun
- Jul
- Aug
- Sep
- Oct
- Nov
- Dec →

Date and time (UTC)	Rocket	Flight number	Launch site		LSP	
Date and time (UTC)	Payload	Operator	Orbit	Function	Decay (UTC)	Outcome
Date and time (UTC)	Remarks					
=== January-March ===
17 January; 04:31	(India) Agni 2		(India) Integrated Test Range		(India) DRDO	
17 January; 04:31	(India) Reentry Vehicle Mk 2	DRDO	Suborbital	Missile test	17 January	Successful
26 January; 03:57	(United States) Aries		(United States) Kauai Test Facility		(United States) US Navy	
26 January; 03:57	(United States) Aegis TTV-2	USN	Suborbital	ABM target	26 January	Intercepted
26 January; 03:57	Target for FTR-1A. Apogee: ~300 km					
26 January; 04:03	(United States) RIM-161 SM-3	FTR-1A "Stellar Gemini"	(United States) USS Lake Erie (CG-70), Pacific Ocean launch area, off Kauai		(United States) US Navy	
26 January; 04:03	(United States) LEAP	USN	Suborbital	Missile test	26 January	Successful
26 January; 04:03	Intercepted Aries target missile. Apogee: 100 km					
7 February; 09:28	(United States) LGM-30G Minuteman III	GT175GM	(United States) Vandenberg AFB, LF-10		(United States) US Air Force	
7 February; 09:28	(United States) Mk 12 reentry vehicle ×3	USAF	Suborbital	Missile test	7 February	Successful
9 February; 04:00:06	(Canada) Black Brant 9CM1		(United States) White Sands		(United States) NASA	
9 February; 04:00:06	(United States) JHU FOT 16	NASA, JHU	Suborbital	UV astronomy	9 February	Successful
12 February; 16:28	(Canada) Black Brant IX		(United States) White Sands		(United States) NASA	
12 February; 16:28	(United States) NASA 36.187NM	NASA	Suborbital	Microgravity research	12 February	Successful
16 February; 10:28	(Russia) R-29RM Shtil		(Russia) K-407 Novomoskovsk, Barents Sea		(Russia) Russian Navy	
16 February; 10:28	(Russia) Reentry vehicle ×4	Russian Navy	Suborbital	Missile test	16 February	Successful
16 February; 10:43	(Russia) RT-2PM Topol		(Russia) Plesetsk Site 169		(Russia) RVSN	
16 February; 10:43	(Russia) Reentry vehicles	RVSN	Suborbital	Missile test	16 February	Successful
19 February	(India) RH-200SV		(India) Satish Dhawan Space Centre		(India) ISRO	
19 February	(India)	ISRO	Suborbital	Test flight	19 February	Successful
20 February; 18:58	(United States) SR19/SR19		(United States) Wake Island		(United States) SMDC	
20 February; 18:58	(United States) TCMP-3B	SMDC	Suborbital	Test flight	20 February	Successful
22 February; 04:55	(Canada) Black Brant IX		(United States) White Sands		(United States) NASA	
22 February; 04:55	(United States) (United Kingdom) J-PEX 2	NRL, Leicester University	Suborbital	UV astronomy	22 February	Successful
22 March; 22:15	(United States) Aries		(United States) Kodiak Launch Complex, LP-2		(United States) US Air Force	
22 March; 22:15	(United States) QRLV-1	USAF, USN	Suborbital	Target	22 March	Successful
31 March	(United States) Hera		(United States) Fort Wingate, LC-96		(United States) SMDC	
31 March	(United States) MBRV-3	SMDC	Suborbital	Target for PAC-3	31 March	Successful
31 March; 06:00	(India) Prithvi		(India) Integrated Test Range		(India) DRDO	
31 March; 06:00	(India)	DRDO	Suborbital	Missile test	31 March	Successful
=== April-June ===
17 April; 22:00	(France) MSBS M45		(France) L'Inflexible (S615), Bay of Biscay		(France) French Navy	
17 April; 22:00	(France) Reentry vehicle ×6	French Navy	Suborbital	Missile test	17 April	Successful
18 April	(Iran) Shahab 1		(Iran) Kermanshah Air Base		(Iran)	
18 April	(Iran) Warhead		Suborbital	Missile strike	18 April	Successful
18 April	Missile strikes on MKO militant camps, many launches.					
29 April; 11:28	(United States) Maxus		(Sweden) Esrange		(Sweden) SSC	
29 April; 11:28	MAXUS 4	ESA	Suborbital	Microgravity research	29 April	Successful
8 May; 09:55	(United Kingdom) Skylark 7		(Sweden) Esrange, Skylark launch tower		(United Kingdom) Sounding Rocket Services	
8 May; 09:55	(Germany) TEXUS 39	DLR	Suborbital	Microgravity research	8 May	Successful
8 May; 09:55	Apogee: 248 km					
14 May	(United States) Trident D5	FCET-24	(United States) USS Kentucky (SSBN-737), Eastern Test Range		(United States) US Navy	
14 May	(United States) Reentry vehicles	USN	Suborbital	Missile test	14 May	Successful
15 May; 01:57	(United States) Improved Orion		(Norway) Andøya Rocket Range		(Norway) NDRE	
15 May; 01:57	(Norway) HiN-2	NDRE	Suborbital	Test flight	15 May	Successful
31 May	(India) RH-200SV		(India) Satish Dhawan Space Centre		(India) ISRO	
31 May	(India)	ISRO	Suborbital	Test flight	31 May	Successful
5 June; 11:32	(Russia) R-29RM Shtil		(Russia) K-51 Verkhoturye, Barents Sea		(Russia) Russian Navy	
5 June; 11:32	(Russia) Reentry vehicle ×4	Russian Navy	Suborbital	Missile test	5 June	Successful
21 June; 17:32	(Canada) Black Brant IX		(United States) White Sands, LC-36		(United States) NASA	
21 June; 17:32	(United States) TXI	NASA/GSFC	Suborbital	Solar radiation research	21 June	Successful
25 June; 23:16	(United States) Trident D5	FCET-25	(United States) USS Louisiana (SSBN-743), Eastern Test Range		(United States) US Navy	
25 June; 23:16	(United States) Reentry vehicles	USN	Suborbital	Missile test	25 June	Successful
25 June; 23:16	(United States) Trident D5	FCET-25	(United States) USS Louisiana, Eastern Test Range		(United States) US Navy	
25 June; 23:16	(United States) Reentry vehicles	USN	Suborbital	Missile test	25 June	Successful
26 June; 01:13	(United States) Trident D5	FCET-25	(United States) USS Louisiana, Eastern Test Range		(United States) US Navy	
26 June; 01:13	(United States) Reentry vehicles	USN	Suborbital	Missile test	26 June	Successful
27 June	(Israel) Jericho II		(Israel) Palmachim Airbase		(Israel) Israeli Air Force	
27 June	(Israel)	IAF	Suborbital	Missile test	27 June	Successful
27 June; 04:35	(Russia) UR-100NU		(Kazakhstan) Baikonur, Site 132/30		(Russia) RVSN	
27 June; 04:35	(Russia)	RVSN	Suborbital	Missile test	27 June	Successful
29 June; 04:44:01	(Canada) Black Brant VC		(United States) Wallops Flight Facility		(United States) NASA	
29 June; 04:44:01	(United States) NASA 21.125GE	NASA	Suborbital	Ionospheric research	29 June	Successful
=== July-September ===
31 August; 20:00	(United States) GBI BV	BV-2	(United States) Vandenberg AFB, LF-21		(United States) US Air Force	
31 August; 20:00	(United States) Dummy EKV	BMDO	Suborbital	Missile test	31 August	Successful
31 August; 20:00	Maiden flight of the Boeing Boost Vehicle. Apogee: ~200 km					
=== October-December ===
24 October 2001; 16:00	Taiwan Sounding Rocket	Sounding Rocket II	(Taiwan) Jiu Peng Air Base		(Taiwan) NSPO	
24 October 2001; 16:00	(Taiwan) TMA release experiment	NSPO	Suborbital	Ionosphere research	24 October	Failure
24 October 2001; 16:00	Second stage failed to ignite at T+20 seconds.					
13 December; 18:15	(United States) GBI BV	BV-3	(United States) Vandenberg AFB, LF-21		(United States) US Air Force	
13 December; 18:15	(United States) Dummy EKV	BMDO	Suborbital	Missile test	13 December	Failure
13 December; 18:15	Missile steered off course 30 seconds after launch, flight was terminated by range safety					

- ← Jan
- Feb
- Mar
- Apr
- May
- Jun
- Jul
- Aug
- Sep
- Oct
- Nov
- Dec →

== Deep space rendezvous ==
Date (GMT)	Spacecraft	Event	Remarks
15 January	Stardust	1st flyby of the Earth	
12 February	NEAR	Landed on 433 Eros	First-ever asteroid landing
25 May	Galileo	8th flyby of Callisto	
6 August	Galileo	4th flyby of Io	
22 September	Deep Space 1	Flyby of 19P/Borrelly	
24 October	Mars Odyssey	Areocentric orbit injection	

== EVAs ==
Start date/time	Duration	End time	Spacecraft	Crew	Function	Remarks
10 February; 15:50	7 hours 34 minutes	23:24	STS-98; ISS Atlantis	(United States) Thomas D. Jones (United States) Robert Curbeam	Removed protective launch covers and disconnected power and cooling cables between Destiny and Atlantis, while crewmembers inside moved the 3,800-cubic-foot (110 m^{3}) laboratory from the payload bay to its home on the Unity node. Curbeam and Jones then connected electrical, data and cooling lines to the lab, during which a small amount of ammonia crystals leaked from one of the hoses, prompting a decontamination procedure.	
12 February; 15:59	6 hours 50 minutes	22:49	STS-98; ISS Atlantis	(United States) Thomas D. Jones (United States) Robert Curbeam	Installed the shuttle docking adapter onto Destiny, installed insulating covers over the pins that held Destiny in place during launch, attached a vent to the lab's air system, installed handrails and sockets on the exterior of Destiny, and attached a base for the future space station robotic arm.	
14 February; 14:48	5 hours 25 minutes	20:13	STS-98; ISS Atlantis	(United States) Thomas D. Jones (United States) Robert Curbeam	Attached a spare communications antenna to the station, double-checked connections between the Destiny lab and its docking port, released a cooling radiator on the station, inspected solar array connections at the top of the station, and tested the ability of a spacewalker to carry an immobile crew member back to the shuttle airlock.	100th American spacewalk.
11 March; 05:12	8 hours 56 minutes	14:08	STS-102; ISS Discovery	(United States) James S. Voss (United States) Susan J. Helms	Prepared PMA-3 for repositioning from Unity's Earth-facing berth to the port-side berth to make room for the Leonardo MPLM. Removed a Lab Cradle Assembly from the shuttle's cargo bay and installed it on the side of Destiny, and installed a cable tray to Destiny for later use by the station's robot arm. After re-entering the shuttle's airlock, the spacewalkers remained ready to assist if any troubles were encountered by the crew inside the shuttle.	Longest-duration EVA in history.
13 March; 05:23	6 hours 21 minutes	11:44	STS-102; ISS Discovery	(Australia) / (United States) Andy Thomas (United States) Paul W. Richards	Installed an External Stowage Platform for spare station parts, attached a spare ammonia coolant pump to the platform, finished connecting several cables put in place on the first EVA for the station's robotic arm. Inspected a Unity node heater connection, and inspected of an exterior experiment, the Floating Potential Probe.	
22 April; 11:45	7 hours 10 minutes	18:55	STS-100; ISS Endeavour	(Canada) Chris Hadfield (United States) Scott E. Parazynski	Installed the station's UHF antenna, and the Canadian Space Agency made Canadarm2. Connected cables to give the arm power and allow it to accept computer commands from inside the lab.	Hadfield became the first Canadian spacewalker.
24 April; 12:34	7 hours 40 minutes	20:14	STS-100; ISS Endeavour	(Canada) Chris Hadfield (United States) Scott E. Parazynski	Connected the Power Data Grapple Fixture circuits for Canadarm2 onto Destiny, removed an early communications antenna, transferred a spare Direct Current Switching Unit from the shuttle's payload bay to an equipment storage rack on the outside of Destiny.	
8 June; 14:21	19 minutes	14:40	Expedition 2 ISS Zvezda	(Russia) Yury Usachyov (United States) James S. Voss	Installed the docking cone onto the Zvezda module, in preparation for the arrival of the Russian Pirs docking compartment.	Conducted from the transfer compartment of the Zvezda Service Module.
15 July; 03:10	5 hours 59 minutes	09:09	STS-104; ISS Atlantis	(United States) Michael L. Gernhardt (United States) James F. Reilly	Installed the Quest Joint Airlock onto the Unity node.	
18 July; 03:04	6 hours 29 minutes	09:33	STS-104; ISS Atlantis	(United States) Michael L. Gernhardt (United States) James F. Reilly	Installed one of two high-pressure nitrogen tanks, and one of two high-pressure oxygen tanks onto Quest, and installed grapple fixture and trunion covers.	
21 July; 04:35	4 hours 2 minutes	08:37	STS-104; ISS Quest	(United States) Michael L. Gernhardt (United States) James F. Reilly	Installed the second high-pressure nitrogen tank, and the second oxygen tank onto the Quest airlock.	First EVA conducted from the Quest airlock.
16 August; 13:58	6 hours 16 minutes	20:14	STS-105; ISS Discovery	(United States) Daniel T. Barry (United States) Patrick G. Forrester	Installed an Early Ammonia Servicer onto the station's P6 truss, co-location of the foot restraint in a stowed location, and installed the MISSE-1 and 2 containers onto the Quest airlock.	
18 August; 13:42	5 hours 29 minutes	19:11	STS-105; ISS Discovery	(United States) Daniel T. Barry (United States) Patrick G. Forrester	Installed heater cables and handrails onto the Destiny laboratory.	
8 October; 14:24	4 hours 58 minutes	19:22	Expedition 3 ISS Pirs	(Russia) Vladimir Dezhurov (Russia) Mikhail Tyurin	Installed cables between Pirs, and Zvezda to allow spacewalk radio communications between the two sections. Installed handrails onto Pirs, and installed an exterior ladder to assist spacewalkers leaving Pirs. Installed a Strela cargo crane.	First EVA conducted from the Pirs docking compartment.
15 October; 09:17	5 hours 51 minutes	15:08	Expedition 3 ISS Pirs	(Russia) Vladimir Dezhurov (Russia) Mikhail Tyurin	Installed Russian commercial experiments (MPAC-SEEDS) onto the exterior of the Pirs docking compartment.	
12 November; 21:41	5 hours 5 minutes	13 November; 02:46	Expedition 3 ISS Pirs	(Russia) Vladimir Dezhurov (United States) Frank L. Culbertson	Connected cables on the exterior of Pirs for the Kurs automated docking system, completed checks of the Strela cargo crane, and inspected and photographed a panel of a solar array on Zvezda that had a portion of a panel not fully unfolded.	
3 December; 13:20	2 hours 46 minutes	16:06	Expedition 3 ISS Pirs	(Russia) Vladimir Dezhurov (Russia) Mikhail Tyurin	Removed an obstruction that prevented a Progress resupply ship from firmly docking with the station, and took pictures of the debris and of the docking interface.	
10 December; 17:52	4 hours 12 minutes	22:04	STS-108; ISS Endeavour	(United States) Linda M. Godwin (United States) Daniel M. Tani	Installed insulating blankets around two Beta Gimbal Assemblies that rotate the station's solar array wings, and performed get-ahead tasks in preparation for STS-110's spacewalks.	

== Orbital launch statistics ==
=== By country ===
For the purposes of this section, the yearly tally of orbital launches by country assigns each flight to the country of origin of the rocket, not to the launch services provider or the spaceport.

Country	Launches	Successes	Failures	Partial failures
China	1	1	0	0
France	8	7	0	1
India	2	1	1	0
Japan	1	1	0	0
Russia	19	19	0	0
Ukraine	6	6	0	0
United States	22	21	1	0
World	59	56	2	1

=== By rocket ===
- Ariane 4
- Ariane 5
- Atlas II
- Delta II
- Molniya-M
- Soyuz-U
- Soyuz-FG
- Tsyklon-2
- Tsyklon-3
- Space Shuttle
- Titan IV
- Proton-K
- Proton-M
- Zenit-2
- Zenit-3
- Others

==== By family ====
Family	Country	Launches	Successes	Failures	Partial failures	Remarks
Ariane	Europe	8	7	0	1	
Athena	United States	1	1	0	0	Final flight
Atlas	United States	4	4	0	0	
Delta	United States	7	7	0	0	
GSLV	India	1	0	1	0	Maiden flight
H-II	Japan	1	1	0	0	
Long March	China	1	1	0	0	
Minotaur	United States	1	0	1	0	
PSLV	India	1	1	0	0	
R-7	Russia	11	11	0	0	
R-14	Russia	1	1	0	0	
R-36	Ukraine	3	3	0	0	
RT-2PM	Russia	1	1	0	0	
Space Shuttle	United States	6	6	0	0	
Titan	United States	3	3	0	0	
Universal Rocket	Russia	6	6	0	0	
Zenit	Ukraine	3	3	0	0	

==== By type ====
Rocket	Country	Family	Launches	Successes	Failures	Partial failures	Remarks
Ariane 4	Europe	Ariane	6	6	0	0	
Ariane 5	Europe	Ariane	2	1	0	1	
Athena I	United States	Athena	1	1	0	0	Final flight
Atlas II	United States	Atlas	4	4	0	0	
Delta II	United States	Delta	7	7	0	0	
GLSV	India	GSLV	1	0	1	0	Maiden flight
H-IIA	Japan	H-II	1	1	0	0	Maiden flight
Kosmos	Russia	R-14	1	1	0	0	
Long March 2	China	Long March	1	1	0	0	
Molniya	Russia	R-7	2	2	0	0	
PSLV	India	PSLV	1	1	0	0	
Proton	Russia	UR	6	6	0	0	
Soyuz	Russia	R-7	9	9	0	0	
Space Shuttle	United States	Space Shuttle	6	6	0	0	
Start	Russia	RT-2PM	1	1	0	0	
Taurus	United States	Minotaur	1	0	1	0	
Titan IV	United States	Titan	3	3	0	0	
Tsyklon	Ukraine	R-36	3	3	0	0	
Zenit	Ukraine	Zenit	3	3	0	0	

==== By configuration ====
Rocket	Country	Type	Launches	Successes	Failures	Partial failures	Remarks
Ariane 4 44P	Europe	Ariane 4	2	2	0	0	Final flight
Ariane 4 44LP	Europe	Ariane 4	1	1	0	0	Final flight
Ariane 4 44L	Europe	Ariane 4	3	3	0	0	
Ariane 5G	Europe	Ariane 5	2	1	0	1	
Athena I	United States	Athena	1	1	0	0	Final flight
Atlas IIA	United States	Atlas II	1	1	0	0	
Atlas IIAS	United States	Atlas II	3	3	0	0	
Delta II 7320-10	United States	Delta II	1	1	0	0	
Delta II 7326-9.5	United States	Delta II	1	1	0	0	
Delta II 7425-10	United States	Delta II	1	1	0	0	
Delta II 7920-10	United States	Delta II	1	1	0	0	
Delta II 7925-9.5	United States	Delta II	3	3	0	0	
GLSV Mk I	India	GSLV	1	0	1	0	Maiden flight
H-IIA 202	Japan	H-IIA	1	1	0	0	Maiden flight
Kosmos-3M	Russia	Kosmos	1	1	0	0	
Long March 2F	China	Long March 2	1	1	0	0	
Molniya-M	Russia	Molniya	2	2	0	0	
PSLV-G	India	PSLV	1	1	0	0	
Proton-K / Blok DM-2	Russia	Proton	3	3	0	0	
Proton-K / Blok DM-2M	Russia	Proton	2	2	0	0	
Proton-M / Briz-M	Russia	Proton	1	1	0	0	Maiden flight
Soyuz-U	Russia	Soyuz	7	7	0	0	
Soyuz-FG	Russia	Soyuz	2	2	0	0	Maiden flight
Space Shuttle	United States	Space Shuttle	6	6	0	0	
Start-1	Russia	Start	1	1	0	0	
Taurus 2110	United States	Taurus	1	0	1	0	
Titan IVB	United States	Titan IV	1	1	0	0	
Titan IVB / Centaur-T	United States	Titan IV	1	1	0	0	
Titan IVB / IUS	United States	Titan IV	1	1	0	0	
Tsyklon-2	Ukraine	Tsyklon	1	1	0	0	
Tsyklon-3	Ukraine	Tsyklon	2	2	0	0	
Zenit-2	Ukraine	Zenit	1	1	0	0	
Zenit-3SL	Ukraine	Zenit	2	2	0	0	

=== By spaceport ===
- Jiuquan
- Kourou
- Satish Dhawan
- Ocean Odyssey
- Tanegashima
- Baikonur
- Plesetsk
- Svobodny
- Cape Canaveral
- Kennedy
- Kodiak
- Vandenberg

Site	Country	Launches	Successes	Failures	Partial failures	Remarks
Baikonur	Kazakhstan	16	16	0	0	
Cape Canaveral	United States	10	10	0	0	
Jiuquan	China	1	1	0	0	
Kennedy	United States	6	6	0	0	
Kodiak	United States	1	1	0	0	First orbital launch
Kourou	France	8	7	0	1	
Ocean Odyssey	(United Nations) International waters	2	2	0	0	
Plesetsk	Russia	6	6	0	0	
Satish Dhawan	India	2	1	1	0	
Svobodny	Russia	1	1	0	0	
Tanegashima	Japan	1	1	0	0	
Vandenberg	United States	5	4	1	0	
Total		59	56	2	1	

=== By orbit ===
- Low Earth
- Low Earth (Mir)
- Low Earth (ISS)
- Low Earth (SSO)
- Medium Earth
- Molniya
- Geosynchronous
- Heliocentric

Orbital regime	Launches	Achieved	Not achieved	Accidentally achieved	Remarks
Low Earth / Sun-synchronous	29	28	1	0	Including flights to ISS and Mir
Geosynchronous /GTO	22	21	1	0	GSLV launch failure left satellite in useless transfer orbit
Medium Earth / Molniya	5	5	0	1	Ariane 5 partial failure left payloads in a useless medium earth orbit. One satellite was able to correct itself to the intended geostationary transfer orbit.
Heliocentric orbit / Planetary transfer	3	3	0	0	
Total	59	57	2	1	
