= PSLV-C43 =

45th Mission of the Indian Polar Satellite Launch Vehicle (PSLV) Program

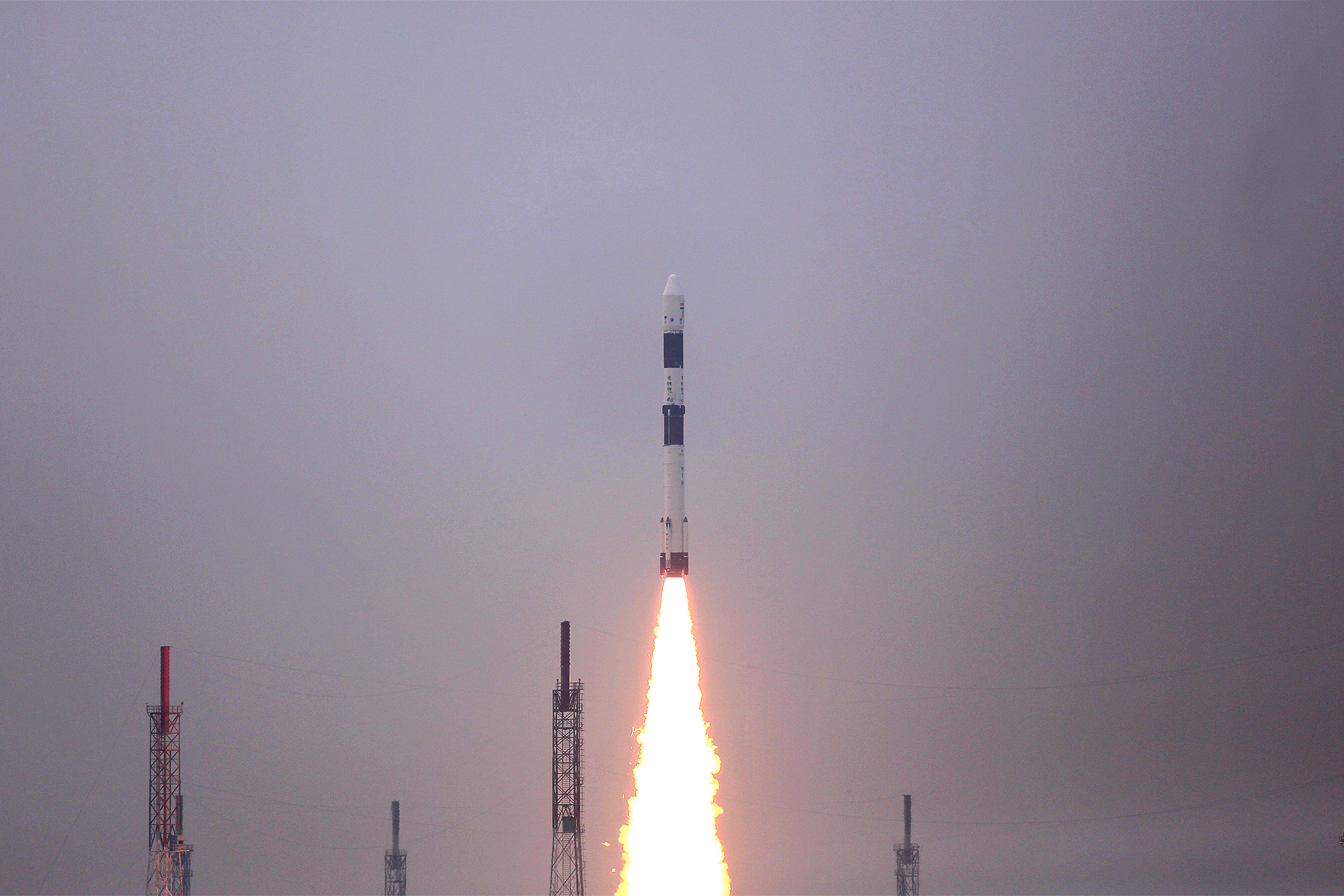
- Liftoff of the PSLV-CA launch vehicle during flight C43

PSLV-CA launch
- Launch: 29 November 2018, 04:28:30 UTC
- Operator: ISRO
- Pad: Sriharikota First
- Payload: 31 satellites: ³Cat-1; CASE; Centauri-1; CICERO-8; Doves × 16 (Flock 3r); FACSAT-1; Global-1; Hiber-1; HSAT-1; HySIS; Innosat-2; Lemur-2 × 4; Reaktor Hello World
- Outcome: Success

PSLV launches

The PSLV-C43 was the 45th mission of the Indian Polar Satellite Launch Vehicle (PSLV) program. It carried and deployed a total of 31 satellites, including the primary payload HySIS in Sun-synchronous orbits. It was launched on 29 November 2018 by the Indian Space Research Organisation (ISRO) from the first launch pad of the Satish Dhawan Space Centre at Sriharikota, Andhra Pradesh.

== PSLV-C43 launch ==
The PSLV-C43 was launched from the first launch pad of the Satish Dhawan Space Centre in Sriharikota at 9:57 A.M. IST on 29 November 2018, following a 28-hour countdown that began at 5:58 A.M. IST on 28 November 2018.
