= 2000 in spaceflight =

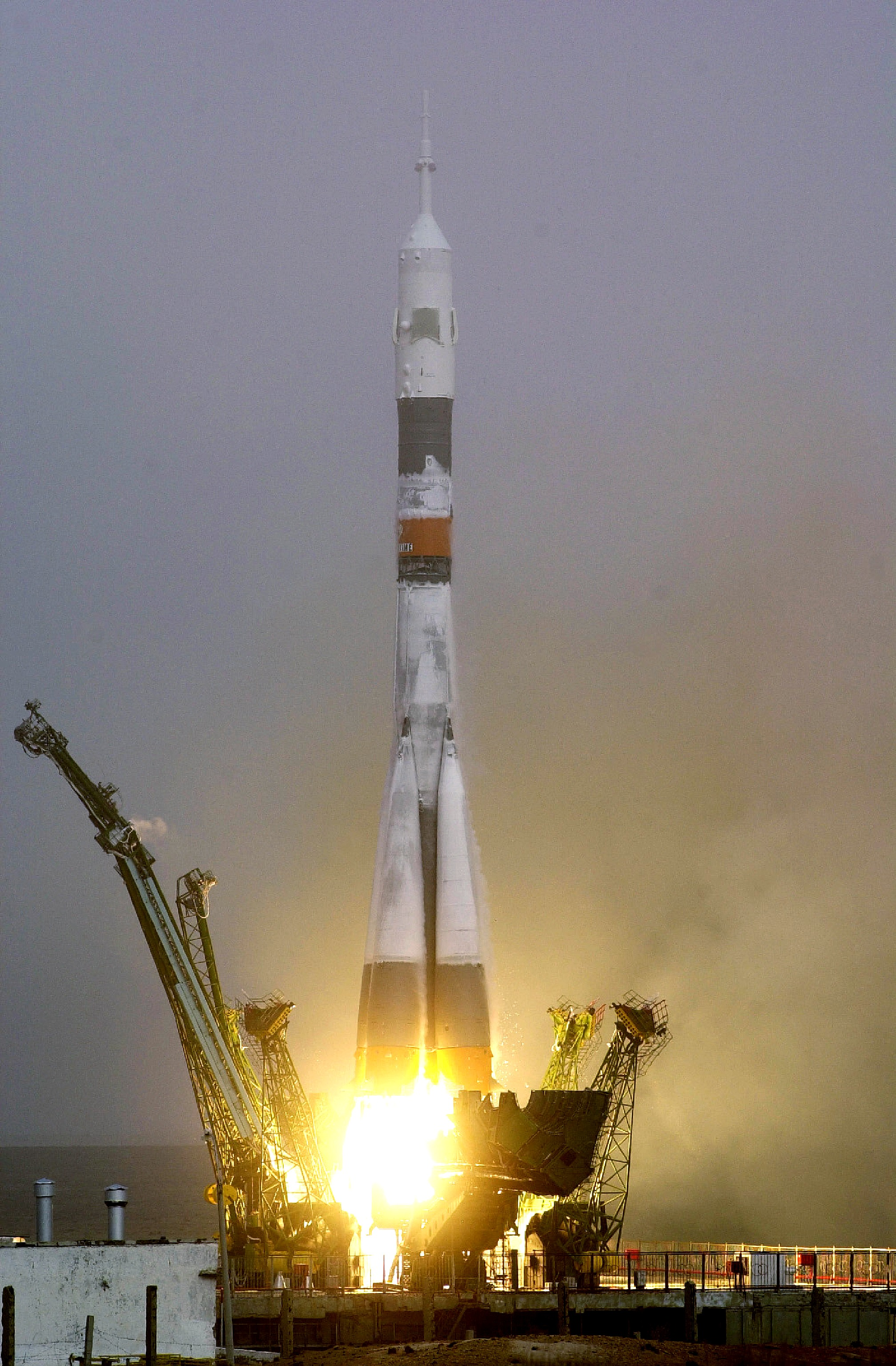
- Expedition 1, the first permanent crew of the International Space Station, launches aboard Soyuz TM-31

Orbital launches
- First: 21 January
- Last: 27 December
- Total: 85
- Successes: 81
- Failures: 4
- Catalogued: 82

Rockets
- Maiden flights: Atlas IIIA; Minotaur I; Soyuz-U/Fregat; Rokot/Briz-KM
- Retirements: Long March 3; Delta III; Pegasus-Hybrid

Crewed flights
- Orbital: 7
- Total travellers: 37

2000 in spaceflight

This article outlines notable events occurring in 2000 in spaceflight, including major launches and EVAs.

== First ISS expedition ==
Soyuz TM-31 was the first Soyuz spaceflight to dock with the International Space Station (ISS). The spacecraft carried the members of Expedition 1, the first long-duration ISS crew. It was launched from Baikonur Cosmodrome in Kazakhstan at 07:52 UT on October 31, 2000, by a Soyuz-U rocket.

== Orbital launches ==
- ← Jan
- Feb
- Mar
- Apr
- May
- Jun
- Jul
- Aug
- Sep
- Oct
- Nov
- Dec →

Date and time (UTC)	Rocket	Flight number	Launch site		LSP	
Date and time (UTC)	Payload (⚀ = CubeSat)	Operator	Orbit	Function	Decay (UTC)	Outcome
Date and time (UTC)	Remarks					
=== January ===
21 January; 01:03	(United States) Atlas IIA / IABS		(United States) Cape Canaveral SLC-36A		(United States)	
21 January; 01:03	(United States) USA-148 (DSCS III B-8)	US Air Force	Geosynchronous	Communications	In orbit	Operational
25 January; 01:04	(France) Ariane-42L H10-3		(France) Kourou ELA-2		(France) Arianespace	
25 January; 01:04	(United States) Galaxy 10R	PanAmSat	Geosynchronous	Communications	In orbit	Operational
25 January; 16:45	(China) Long March 3A		(China) Xichang LC-3		(China)	
25 January; 16:45	(China) ChinaSat 22 (Feng Huo 1A)	ChinaSat / CAST	Geosynchronous	Communications	In orbit	Operational
27 January; 03:03	(United States) Minotaur I		(United States) Vandenberg SLC-8		(United States) Orbital Sciences	
27 January; 03:03	(United States) JAWSAT	Weber State/USAF Academy	Low Earth	Plasma research	In orbit	Operational
27 January; 03:03	(United States) FalconSat 1	USAF Academy	Low Earth	Technology demonstration	In orbit	Operational
27 January; 03:03	(United States) ASUSAT 1	Arizona State	Low Earth	Imaging/Communications	In orbit	Operational
27 January; 03:03	(United States) OCSE	US Air Force	Low Earth	Laser calibration	3 March 2001	Successful
27 January; 03:03	(United States) OPAL	Stanford	Low Earth	Picosatellite deployment	In orbit	Successful
27 January; 03:03	(United States) STENSAT	AMSAT	Low Earth	Communications	In orbit	Spacecraft failure
27 January; 03:03	(United States) MEMS 1A	DARPA	Low Earth	Technology development	In orbit	Operational
27 January; 03:03	(United States) MEMS 1B	DARPA	Low Earth	Technology development	In orbit	Operational
27 January; 03:03	(United States) Thelma	Santa Clara	Low Earth		In orbit	Spacecraft failure
27 January; 03:03	(United States) Louise	Santa Clara	Low Earth		In orbit	Spacecraft failure
27 January; 03:03	(United States) JAK (MASAT)	Santa Clara	Low Earth		In orbit	Spacecraft failure
27 January; 03:03	Maiden flight of Minotaur I Thelma, Louise, JAK, and STENSAT failed to contact ground after deployment from OPAL; Thelma & Louise deployed on 12 February, JAK & STENSAT on 11 February; Picosats also deployed from OPAL at 03:34 UTC on 7 February					
← Jan; Feb; Mar; Apr; May; Jun; Jul; Aug; Sep; Oct; Nov; Dec →; === February ===
1 February; 06:47	(Russia) Soyuz-U		(Kazakhstan) Baikonur Site 1/5		(Russia) Roskosmos	
1 February; 06:47	(Russia) Progress M1-1	Roskosmos	Low Earth (Mir)	Logistics	26 April; 19:27	Successful
1 February; 06:47	Maiden flight of Progress-M1 spacecraft					
3 February; 09:26	(Ukraine) Zenit-2		(Kazakhstan) Baikonur Site 45/1			
3 February; 09:26	(Russia) Kosmos 2369 (Tselina-2 №18)	MO RF	Low Earth	ELINT	In orbit	Operational
3 February; 23:30	(United States) Atlas IIAS		(United States) Cape Canaveral SLC-36B		(Russia) (United States) International Launch Services	
3 February; 23:30	(Spain) Hispasat 1C (Hispasat 84W-1)	Hispasat	Geosynchronous	Communications	In orbit	Deactivated 2 June 2017
8 February; 21:24	(United States) Delta II 7420-10C		(United States) Cape Canaveral SLC-17B		(United States) Boeing IDS	
8 February; 21:24	(United States) Globalstar 60	Globalstar	Low Earth	Communications	In orbit	Operational
8 February; 21:24	(United States) Globalstar 62	Globalstar	Low Earth	Communications	In orbit	Operational
8 February; 21:24	(United States) Globalstar 63	Globalstar	Low Earth	Communications	In orbit	Operational
8 February; 21:24	(United States) Globalstar 64	Globalstar	Low Earth	Communications	In orbit	Operational
8 February; 23:00	(Russia) Soyuz-U / Fregat	ST-07	(Kazakhstan) Baikonur Site 31/6		(France) (Russia) Starsem	
8 February; 23:00	(Russia) IRDT 1	ESA	Low Earth	Recoverable experiments	9 February	Partial Failure
8 February; 23:00	(Russia) IRDT-Fregat	ESA	Low Earth	Recoverable experiments	9 February	Partial Failure
8 February; 23:00	(Russia) Gruzovoy Maket	Lavochkin	Low Earth	Boilerplate	In orbit	Successful
8 February; 23:00	Maiden flight of Soyuz-U/Fregat Variant. First flight of the Fregat Upper stage. Damage to the inflatable heat shield of IRDT led to high landing speed which damaged the spacecraft. Mission Designated:Demonstrator.					
10 February; 01:30	(Japan) M-V		(Japan) Uchinoura LP-M		(Japan) ISAS	
10 February; 01:30	(Japan) ASTRO-E	ISAS	Intended: Low Earth	Astronomy	10 February	Launch failure
10 February; 01:30	Loss of control during first stage burn					
11 February; 17:43	(United States) Space Shuttle Endeavour		(United States) Kennedy LC-39A		(United States) United Space Alliance	
11 February; 17:43	(United States) STS-99	NASA	Low Earth	Radar topography	22 February	Successful
11 February; 17:43	Crewed orbital flight with six astronauts Shuttle Radar Topography Mission					
12 February; 09:10	(Russia) Proton-K / Block-DM3		(Kazakhstan) Baikonur Site 81/23		(Russia) (United States) International Launch Services	
12 February; 09:10	(Indonesia) Garuda 1 (ACeS 1)	ACeS	Geosynchronous	Communications	In orbit	Operational
18 February; 01:04	(France) Ariane-44LP H10-3		(France) Kourou ELA-2		(France) Arianespace	
18 February; 01:04	(Japan) Superbird 4 (Superbird B2)	SCC	Geosynchronous	Communications	In orbit	Operational
← Jan; Feb; Mar; Apr; May; Jun; Jul; Aug; Sep; Oct; Nov; Dec →; === March ===
12 March; 04:07	(Russia) Proton-K / Blok-DM-2		(Kazakhstan) Baikonur Site 200/39		(Russia) Khrunichev	
12 March; 04:07	(Russia) Ekspress-A2 (Ekspress-6A)	RSCC	Geosynchronous	Communications	2015	Successful
12 March; 09:29	(United States) Taurus 1110		(United States) Vandenberg LC-576E		(United States) Orbital Sciences	
12 March; 09:29	(United States) MTI	U.S. Air Force / Sandia	Low Earth	Reconnaissance	14 May 2022	Successful
12 March; 14:19	(Ukraine) Zenit-3SL		(Norway) Ocean Odyssey		(United Nations) Sea Launch	
12 March; 14:19	(United States) ICO F1	ICO	Intended: Medium Earth	Communications	12 March	Launch Failure
12 March; 14:19	Programming error led to premature second stage cutoff.					
20 March; 18:28	(Russia) Soyuz-U / Fregat	ST-08	(Kazakhstan) Baikonur Site 31/6		(France) (Russia) Starsem	
20 March; 18:28	(France) (Russia) Dumsat	Starsem	Medium Earth	Boilerplate	In orbit	Successful
21 March; 23:28	(France) Ariane 5G		(France) Kourou ELA-3		(France) Arianespace	
21 March; 23:28	(India) INSAT-3B	ISRO	Geosynchronous	Communications	In orbit	Operational
21 March; 23:28	(United States) AsiaStar	1worldspace	Geosynchronous	Communications	In orbit	Operational
25 March; 20:34	(United States) Delta II 7326-9.5	D-277	(United States) Vandenberg SLC-2W		(United States) Boeing IDS	
25 March; 20:34	(United States) IMAGE (Explorer 78)	NASA	High Earth	Aurora research	In orbit	Intermittent contact
← Jan; Feb; Mar; Apr; May; Jun; Jul; Aug; Sep; Oct; Nov; Dec →; === April ===
4 April; 05:01	(Russia) Soyuz-U		(Kazakhstan) Baikonur Site 1/5		(Russia) Roskosmos	
4 April; 05:01	(Russia) Soyuz TM-30	Roskosmos	Low Earth (Mir)	Mir EO-28	16 June; 00:34	Successful
4 April; 05:01	Crewed orbital flight with two cosmonauts Final crewed flight to the Mir space station					
17 April; 21:06	(Russia) Proton-K / Blok-DM-2M		(Kazakhstan) Baikonur Site 200/39		(Russia) (United States) International Launch Services	
17 April; 21:06	(France) SESAT 1 (Eutelsat 16C)	Eutelsat	Geosynchronous	Communications	13 February 2018	Deactivated
19 April; 00:29	(France) Ariane-42L H10-3		(France) Kourou ELA-2		(France) Arianespace	
19 April; 00:29	(United States) Galaxy 4R	PanAmSat	Geosynchronous	Communications	April 2009	Deactivated
25 April; 20:08	(Russia) Soyuz-U		(Kazakhstan) Baikonur Site 1/5		(Russia) Roskosmos	
25 April; 20:08	(Russia) Progress M1-2	Roskosmos	Low Earth (Mir)	Logistics	15 October	Successful
← Jan; Feb; Mar; Apr; May; Jun; Jul; Aug; Sep; Oct; Nov; Dec →; === May ===
3 May; 07:07	(United States) Atlas IIA		(United States) Cape Canaveral SLC-36A		(United States)	
3 May; 07:07	(United States) GOES 11 (GOES-L)	NOAA/NASA	Geostationary	Meteorology	15 December 2011	Deactivated
3 May; 13:25	(Russia) Soyuz-U		(Kazakhstan) Baikonur Site 1/5		(Russia)	
3 May; 13:25	(Russia) Kosmos 2370 (Yantar-4KS1M №9/Neman №9)	MO RF	Low Earth	Reconnaissance	3 May 2001	Successful
8 May; 16:01	(United States) Titan IVB (402) / IUS		(United States) Cape Canaveral SLC-40		(United States) Lockheed Martin	
8 May; 16:01	(United States) USA-149 (DSP-20)	US Air Force	Geosynchronous	Early warning	In orbit	Operational
11 May; 01:48	(United States) Delta II 7925-9.5		(United States) Cape Canaveral SLC-17A		(United States) Boeing IDS	
11 May; 01:48	(United States) USA-150 (GPS IIR-4)	US Air Force	Medium Earth	Navigation	In orbit	Operational
16 May; 08:27	(Russia) Rokot / Briz-KM		(Russia) Plesetsk Site 133/3		(France) (Russia) Eurockot	
16 May; 08:27	(France) (Russia) Simsat-1 (IKA-1)	Eurockot	Low Earth	Boilerplate	In orbit	Successful
16 May; 08:27	(Russia) Simsat-2 (IKA-2)	Eurockot	Low Earth	Boilerplate	In orbit	Successful
16 May; 08:27	Maiden flight of Rokot / Briz-KM Variant. First launch of Eurockot. First launch of Rokot from the Plesetsk Cosmodrome. First launch of Rokot outside a silo.					
19 May; 10:11	(United States) Space Shuttle Atlantis		(United States) Kennedy LC-39A		(United States) United Space Alliance	
19 May; 10:11	(United States) STS-101	NASA	Low Earth (ISS)	ISS assembly	29 May; 06:20	Successful
19 May; 10:11	(United States) Spacehab Double Module	NASA/Spacehab	Low Earth (Atlantis)	Logistics	29 May; 06:20	Successful
19 May; 10:11	Crewed orbital flight with seven astronauts					
24 May; 23:10	(United States) Atlas IIIA		(United States) Cape Canaveral SLC-36B		(Russia) (United States) International Launch Services	
24 May; 23:10	(France) Eutelsat W4 (Eutelsat 36A/Eutelsat 70C)	Eutelsat	Geosynchronous	Communications	In orbit	Operational
24 May; 23:10	Maiden flight of Atlas IIIA.					
← Jan; Feb; Mar; Apr; May; Jun; Jul; Aug; Sep; Oct; Nov; Dec →; === June ===
6 June; 02:59	(Russia) Proton-K / Briz-M		(Kazakhstan) Baikonur Site 81/24		(Russia) (United States) International Launch Services	
6 June; 02:59	(Russia) Gorizont 33 (Gorizont 45L)	RSCC	Geosynchronous	Communications	In orbit	Operational
7 June; 13:19	(United States) Pegasus-XL		(United States) Vandenberg Stargazer		(United States) Orbital Sciences	
7 June; 13:19	(United States) (United Kingdom) TSX-5	US Air Force / Royal Air Force	Low Earth	Reconnaissance	In orbit	Operational
24 June; 00:28	(Russia) Proton-K / Blok DM-2M		(Kazakhstan) Baikonur Site 200/39		(Russia)	
24 June; 00:28	(Russia) Ekspress-A3 (Ekspress 3A)	Intersputnik	Geosynchronous	Communications	September 2009	Deactivated
25 June; 11:50	(China) Long March 3		(China) Xichang LC-3		(China)	
25 June; 11:50	(China) Fengyun 2B	CASC	Geosynchronous	Meteorology	In orbit	Operational
25 June; 11:50	Final flight of Long March 3					
28 June; 10:37	(Russia) Kosmos-3M		(Russia) Plesetsk Site 132/1		(Russia)	
28 June; 10:37	(Russia) Nadezhda 6 (Nadezhda №9)	MO RF	Low Earth (SSO)	Navigation	In orbit	Operational
28 June; 10:37	(China) Tsinghua 1 (Hangtian Qinghua 1)	Tsinghua	Low Earth (SSO)	Technology development	In orbit	Operational
28 June; 10:37	(United Kingdom) SNAP 1	SSTL	Low Earth (SSO)	Technology development	In orbit	Operational
30 June; 12:56	(United States) Atlas IIA		(United States) Cape Canaveral SLC-36A		(United States)	
30 June; 12:56	(United States) TDRS-8 (TDRS-H)	NASA	Geosynchronous	Communications	In orbit	Operational
30 June; 12:56	First advanced TDRS satellite					
30 June; 22:08	(Russia) Proton-K / Blok DM-2M		(Kazakhstan) Baikonur Site 81/24		(Russia) (United States) International Launch Services	
30 June; 22:08	(United States) Sirius FM-1 (Radiosat 1)	Sirius	Tundra	Communications	2016	Deactivated
← Jan; Feb; Mar; Apr; May; Jun; Jul; Aug; Sep; Oct; Nov; Dec →; === July ===
4 July; 23:44	(Russia) Proton-K / Blok-DM-2		(Kazakhstan) Baikonur Site 200/39		(Russia)	
4 July; 23:44	(Russia) Kosmos 2371 (Potok №10/Geizer 22L)	MO RF	Geosynchronous	Communications	In orbit	Operational
12 July; 04:56	(Russia) Proton-K		(Kazakhstan) Baikonur Site 81/23		(Russia) Roskosmos	
12 July; 04:56	(United Nations) Zvezda	Roskosmos	Low Earth (ISS)	ISS component	In orbit	Operational
12 July; 04:56	ISS flight 1R					
14 July; 05:21	(United States) Atlas IIAS		(United States) Cape Canaveral SLC-36B		(Russia) (United States) International Launch Services	
14 July; 05:21	(United States) Echostar 6 (Bermudasat 1)	EchoStar	Geosynchronous	Communications	In orbit	Operational
15 July; 12:00	(Russia) Kosmos-3M		(Russia) Plesetsk Site 132/1		(Russia)	
15 July; 12:00	(Germany) CHAMP	DLR	Low Earth	Geophysics	19 September 2010; 09:43	Successful
15 July; 12:00	(Italy) MITA	ASI	Low Earth	Particle detection	15 August 2001	Successful
15 July; 12:00	(Germany) Rubin 1 (Bird-Rubin)	OHB-System	Low Earth	Monitor carrier rocket	30 August 2001	Successful
15 July; 12:00	Rubin 1 was permanently attached to the second stage of Kosmos-3M					
16 July; 09:17	(United States) Delta II 7925-9.5		(United States) Cape Canaveral SLC-17A		(United States) Boeing IDS	
16 July; 09:17	(United States) USA-151 (GPS IIR-5)	US Air Force	Medium Earth	Navigation	In orbit	Operational
16 July; 12:39	(Russia) Soyuz-U/Fregat		(Kazakhstan) Baikonur Site 31/6		(France) (Russia) Starsem	
16 July; 12:39	Cluster FM6 (Salsa)	ESA	High Earth	Magnetosphere research	In orbit	Operational
16 July; 12:39	Cluster FM7 (Samba)	ESA	High Earth	Magnetosphere research	8 September 2024	Successful
16 July; 12:39	Cluster II mission					
19 July; 20:09	(United States) Minotaur I		(United States) Vandenberg SLC-8		(United States) Orbital Sciences	
19 July; 20:09	(United States) Mightysat 2.1 (Sindri)	US Air Force/DARPA	Low Earth	Reconnaissance	11 December 2002	Successful
19 July; 20:09	(United States) MEMS 2A	US Air Force	Low Earth	Technology development	7 November 2002	Successful
19 July; 20:09	(United States) MEMS 2B	US Air Force	Low Earth	Technology development	7 November 2002	Successful
28 July; 22:42	(Ukraine) Zenit-3SL		(Norway) Ocean Odyssey + SL Commander (U.S.)		(United Nations) Sea Launch	
28 July; 22:42	(United States) PAS-9 (Intelsat 9)	PanAmSat	Geosynchronous	Communications	In orbit	Operational
← Jan; Feb; Mar; Apr; May; Jun; Jul; Aug; Sep; Oct; Nov; Dec →; === August ===
6 August; 18:26	(Russia) Soyuz-U		(Kazakhstan) Baikonur Site 1/5		(Russia) Roscosmos	
6 August; 18:26	(Russia) Progress M1-3	Roscosmos	Low Earth (ISS)	ISS logistics	1 November; 07:05	Successful
6 August; 18:26	ISS flight 1P					
9 August; 11:13	(Russia) Soyuz-U / Fregat		(Kazakhstan) Baikonur Site 31/6		(France) (Russia) Starsem	
9 August; 11:13	Cluster FM5 (Rumba)	ESA	High Earth	Magnetosphere research	22 October 2025	Successful
9 August; 11:13	Cluster FM8 (Tango)	ESA	High Earth	Magnetosphere research	In orbit	Operational
9 August; 11:13	Cluster II mission.					
17 August; 23:16	(France) Ariane 4 44LP		(France) Kourou ELA-2		(France) Arianespace	
17 August; 23:16	(Brazil) Brasilsat B4 (Star One B4)	Embratel	Geosynchronous	Communications	In orbit	Successful
17 August; 23:16	(Egypt) Nilesat 102	Nilesat	Geosynchronous	Communications	In orbit	Operational
17 August; 23:45	(United States) Titan IVB (403)		(United States) Vandenberg SLC-4E		(United States) Lockheed Martin	
17 August; 23:45	(United States) USA-152 (Lacrosse 4, Onyx 4)	NRO	Low Earth	Reconnaissance	In orbit	Operational
17 August; 23:45	NROL-11 Mission.					
23 August; 11:05	(United States) Delta III 8930		(United States) Cape Canaveral SLC-17B		(United States) Boeing IDS	
23 August; 11:05	(United States) DM-F3	Boeing IDS	Intended: Geostationary transfer Actual: Medium Earth	Boilerplate / Calibration target	31 December 2019	Partial failure
23 August; 11:05	Payload placed in lower orbit than expected due to atmospheric conditions. Final flight of Delta III.					
28 August; 20:08	(Russia) Proton-K / DM-2		(Kazakhstan) Baikonur Site 81/24		(Russia) Khrunichev	
28 August; 20:08	(Russia) Raduga-1 5	MO RF	Geosynchronous	Communications	In orbit	Operational
=== September ===
1 September; 03:25	(China) Long March 4B		(China) Taiyuan LC-1		(China)	
1 September; 03:25	(China) Ziyuan-2 01	CAST	Low Earth	Imaging	In orbit	Operational
5 September; 09:43	(Russia) Proton-K/DM-2M		(Kazakhstan) Baikonur Site 81/23		(Russia) (United States) International Launch Services	
5 September; 09:43	(United States) Radiosat 2	Sirius	Tundra	Communications	In orbit	Deactivated 2016
6 September; 22:23	(France) Ariane 4 44P		(France) Kourou ELA-2		(France) Arianespace	
6 September; 22:23	(France) Eutelsat W1	Eutelsat	Geosynchronous	Communications	In orbit	Operational
8 September; 12:45	(United States) Space Shuttle Atlantis		(United States) Kennedy LC-39B		(United States) United Space Alliance	
8 September; 12:45	(United States) STS-106	NASA	Low Earth (ISS)	ISS assembly	20 September; 07:56	Successful
8 September; 12:45	(United States) Spacehab Double Module	NASA/Spacehab	Low Earth (Atlantis)	Logistics	20 September; 07:56	Successful
8 September; 12:45	Crewed orbital flight with seven astronauts					
14 September; 22:54	(France) Ariane 5G		(France) Kourou ELA-3		(France) Arianespace	
14 September; 22:54	(Luxembourg) Astra 2B	SES	Geosynchronous	Communications	In orbit	Operational
14 September; 22:54	(United States) GE 7	GE Americom	Geosynchronous	Communications	In orbit	Operational
21 September; 10:22	(United States) Titan II 23G		(United States) Vandenberg SLC-4W		(United States) Lockheed Martin	
21 September; 10:22	(United States) NOAA-16 (NOAA-L)	NOAA/NASA	Sun-synchronous	Weather satellite	25 November 2015	Successful
25 September; 10:10	(Ukraine) Zenit-2		(Kazakhstan) Baikonur Site 45/1		(Russia)	
25 September; 10:10	(Russia) Kosmos 2372 (Orlets-2 №2)	MO RF	Low Earth	Reconnaissance	20 April 2001	Successful
26 September; 10:05	(Ukraine) Dnepr		(Kazakhstan) Baikonur Site 109/95		(Russia) ISC Kosmotras	
26 September; 10:05	(Malaysia) Tiung SAT	ASTB	Low Earth	Earth Imaging	In orbit	Operational
26 September; 10:05	(Italy) MegSat-1	MegSat	Low Earth	Research	In orbit	Operational
26 September; 10:05	(Italy) UniSat	Universita degli Studi	Low Earth	Earth Imaging	In orbit	Operational
26 September; 10:05	(Saudi Arabia) SaudiSat 1A	SISR	Low Earth	Communications	In orbit	Operational
26 September; 10:05	(Saudi Arabia) SaudiSat 1B	SISR	Low Earth	Communications	In orbit	Operational
29 September; 09:30	(Russia) Soyuz-U		(Kazakhstan) Baikonur Site 31/6		(Russia)	
29 September; 09:30	(Russia) Kosmos 2375 (Yantar-1KFT №20)	MO RF	Low Earth	Cartography	14 November; 22:53	Successful
=== October ===
1 October; 22:00	(Russia) Proton-K/DM-2M		(Kazakhstan) Baikonur Site 81/23		(Russia) (United States) International Launch Services	
1 October; 22:00	(United States) Worldsat-1	GE Americom	Geosynchronous	Communications	In orbit	Operational
6 October; 23:00	(France) Ariane 4 42L		(France) Kourou ELA-2		(France) Arianespace	
6 October; 23:00	(Japan) N-SAT-110	SCC/JSAT Corporation	Geosynchronous	Communications	In orbit	Operational
9 October; 05:38	(United States) Pegasus-H		(Marshall Islands) Kwajalein Atoll		(United States) Orbital Sciences	
9 October; 05:38	(United States) HETE-2	NASA/MIT	Low Earth	Astronomy	In orbit	Operational
11 October; 23:17	(United States) Space Shuttle Discovery		(United States) Kennedy LC-39A		(United States) United Space Alliance	
11 October; 23:17	(United States) STS-92	NASA	Low Earth (ISS)	ISS assembly	24 October; 22:00	Successful
11 October; 23:17	(United Nations) Z-1 Truss	NASA	Low Earth (ISS)	ISS component	In orbit	Operational
11 October; 23:17	(United Nations) PMA-3	NASA	Low Earth (ISS)	ISS component	In orbit	Operational
11 October; 23:17	Crewed orbital flight with seven astronauts 100th flight of the Space Shuttle program					
13 October; 14:12	(Russia) Proton-K/DM-2		(Kazakhstan) Baikonur Site 81/24		(Russia)	
13 October; 14:12	(Russia) Kosmos 2374 (GLONASS)	KNITs	Medium Earth	Navigation	In orbit	Operational
13 October; 14:12	(Russia) Kosmos 2375 (GLONASS)	KNITs	Medium Earth	Navigation	In orbit	Operational
13 October; 14:12	(Russia) Kosmos 2376 (GLONASS)	KNITs	Medium Earth	Navigation	In orbit	Operational
16 October; 21:27	(Russia) Soyuz-U		(Kazakhstan) Baikonur Site 1/5		(Russia) Roskosmos	
16 October; 21:27	(Russia) Progress M-43	Roskosmos	Low Earth (Mir)	Logistics	29 January 2001	Successful
20 October; 00:40	(United States) Atlas IIA/IABS		(United States) Cape Canaveral SLC-36A		(United States)	
20 October; 00:40	(United States) USA 153 (DSCS III B-11)	US Air Force	Geosynchronous	Communications	In orbit	Operational
21 October; 05:52	(Ukraine) Zenit-3SL		(Norway) Ocean Odyssey		(United Nations) Sea Launch	
21 October; 05:52	(United Arab Emirates) Thuraya 1	Thuraya	Operational: Geosychronous; Actual: Graveyard	Communications	In orbit	Successful
21 October; 05:52	Thuraya 1 retired in May 2007					
21 October; 22:00	(Russia) Proton-K/DM-2M		(Kazakhstan) Baikonur Site 81/23		(Russia) (United States) International Launch Services	
21 October; 22:00	(United States) GE 6	GE Americom	Geosynchronous	Communications	In orbit	Operational
29 October; 05:59	(France) Ariane 4 44LP		(France) Kourou ELA-2		(France) Arianespace	
29 October; 05:59	EuropeStar F1	EuropeStar	Geosynchronous	Communications	In orbit	Operational
29 October; 05:59	100th Ariane 4 launch					
30 October; 16:02	(China) Long March 3A		(China) Xichang LC-2		(China)	
30 October; 16:02	(China) Beidou 1A	CNSA	Geosynchronous	Navigation	In orbit	Operational
31 October; 07:52	(Russia) Soyuz-U		(Kazakhstan) Baikonur Site 1/5		(Russia) Roskosmos	
31 October; 07:52	(Russia) Soyuz TM-31	Roskosmos	Low Earth (ISS)	ISS Expedition 1	5 June 2001; 05:41	Successful
31 October; 07:52	Crewed orbital flight with three cosmonauts					
=== November ===
10 November; 17:14	(United States) Delta II 7925-9.5		(United States) Cape Canaveral SLC-17A		(United States) Boeing IDS	
10 November; 17:14	(United States) USA-154 (GPS IIR-6)	US Air Force	Medium Earth	Navigation	In orbit	Successful
16 November; 01:07	(France) Ariane 5G		(France) Kourou ELA-3		(France) Arianespace	
16 November; 01:07	(United States) PAS-1R	PanAmSat	Geosynchronous	Communications	In orbit	Operational
16 November; 01:07	(United States) AMSAT-Oscar 40	AMSAT	High Earth	Communications	In orbit	Operational
16 November; 01:07	(United Kingdom) STRV 1C	DERA	Geostationary transfer	Technology development	In orbit	Operational
16 November; 01:07	(United Kingdom) STRV 1D	DERA	Geostationary transfer	Technology development	In orbit	Operational
16 November; 01:32	(Russia) Soyuz-U		(Kazakhstan) Baikonur Site 1/5		(Russia) Roskosmos	
16 November; 01:32	(Russia) Progress M1-4	Roskosmos	Low Earth (ISS)	Logistics	8 February 2001; 13:50	Successful
16 November; 01:32	ISS flight 2P					
20 November; 23:00	(Russia) Kosmos-3M		(Russia) Plesetsk Site 132/1		(Russia)	
20 November; 23:00	(United States) Quick Bird 1	EarthWatch	Intended: Low Earth	Earth Imaging	21 November; ~00:30	Launch Failure
20 November; 23:00	Second stage failed to restart					
21 November; 18:24	(United States) Delta II 7320-10		(United States) Vandenberg SLC-2W		(United States) Boeing IDS	
21 November; 18:24	(United States) Earth Observing-1	NASA	Low Earth	Technology development	In orbit	Operational
21 November; 18:24	(Argentina) SAC-C	CONAE	Low Earth	Earth Observation	In orbit	Operational
21 November; 18:24	(Sweden) Munin	SISP	Low Earth	Particle detection Auroral observation	In orbit	Operational
21 November; 23:56	(France) Ariane 4 44L		(France) Kourou ELA-2		(France) Arianespace	
21 November; 23:56	(Canada) Anik F1	Telesat	Geosynchronous	Communications	In orbit	Operational
30 November; 19:59	(Russia) Proton-K/DM-2M		(Kazakhstan) Baikonur Site 81/23		(Russia) (United States) International Launch Services	
30 November; 19:59	(United States) Radiosat 3	Sirius	Tundra	Communications	In orbit	Operational
=== December ===
1 December; 03:06	(United States) Space Shuttle Endeavour		(United States) Kennedy LC-39A		(United States) United Space Alliance	
1 December; 03:06	(United States) STS-97	NASA	Low Earth (ISS)	ISS assembly	11 December; 23:03	Successful
1 December; 03:06	(United Nations) P6 Truss	NASA	Low Earth (ISS)	ISS component	In orbit	Operational
1 December; 03:06	Crewed orbital flight with five astronauts					
5 December; 12:32	(Russia) Start-1		(Russia) Svobodny Site 5		(Russia)	
5 December; 12:32	(Israel) EROS-A	Imagesat	Low Earth	Earth observation	In orbit	Operational
6 December; 02:47	(United States) Atlas IIAS		(United States) Cape Canaveral SLC-36A		(United States)	
6 December; 02:47	(United States) USA-155 (SDS-3-2)	US Air Force	Geosynchronous	Communications	In orbit	Operational
6 December; 02:47	NRO L-10					
20 December; 00:26	(France) Ariane 5G		(France) Kourou ELA-3		(France) Arianespace	
20 December; 00:26	(Luxembourg) Astra 2D	SES	Geosynchronous	Communications	In orbit	Operational
20 December; 00:26	(United States) GE 8	GE Americom	Geosynchronous	Communications	In orbit	Operational
20 December; 00:26	(Japan) LDREX	NASDA	Geostationary transfer	Technology development	21 March 2010; 03:40	Failure
20 December; 00:26	LDREX failed to deploy					
20 December; 16:20	(China) Long March 3A		(China) Xichang LC-2		(China)	
20 December; 16:20	(China) Beidou 1B	CNSA	Geosynchronous	Navigation	In orbit	Operational
27 December; 09:56	(Ukraine) Tsyklon-3		(Russia) Plesetsk Site 32/1		(Russia)	
27 December; 09:56	(Russia) Gonets-D1	Rosaviakosmos	Intended: Low Earth	Communications	27 December	Launch Failure
27 December; 09:56	(Russia) Gonets-D1	Rosaviakosmos	Intended: Low Earth	Communications	27 December	Launch Failure
27 December; 09:56	(Russia) Gonets-D1	Rosaviakosmos	Intended: Low Earth	Communications	27 December	Launch Failure
27 December; 09:56	(Russia) Strela-3		Intended: Low Earth	Communications	27 December	Launch Failure
27 December; 09:56	(Russia) Strela-3		Intended: Low Earth	Communications	27 December	Launch Failure
27 December; 09:56	(Russia) Strela-3		Intended: Low Earth	Communications	27 December	Launch Failure
27 December; 09:56	Third stage malfunction					

- ← Jan
- Feb
- Mar
- Apr
- May
- Jun
- Jul
- Aug
- Sep
- Oct
- Nov
- Dec →

== Suborbital launches ==
- ← Jan
- Feb
- Mar
- Apr
- May
- Jun
- Jul
- Aug
- Sep
- Oct
- Nov
- Dec →

Date and time (UTC)	Rocket	Flight number	Launch site		LSP	
Date and time (UTC)	Payload (⚀ = CubeSat)	Operator	Orbit	Function	Decay (UTC)	Outcome
Date and time (UTC)	Remarks					
=== January-December ===
19 January; 02:19	(United States) Minuteman-II		(United States) Vandenberg LF-03		(United States)	
19 January; 02:19	(United States) Integrated Flight Test-4	Ballistic Missile Defense Organization	Suborbital	Anti-ballistic missile test target	L+30 mins	Successful

- ← Jan
- Feb
- Mar
- Apr
- May
- Jun
- Jul
- Aug
- Sep
- Oct
- Nov
- Dec →

== Orbital launch statistics ==
=== By country ===
For the purposes of this section, the yearly tally of orbital launches by country assigns each flight to the country of origin of the rocket, not to the launch services provider or the spaceport.

Country	Launches	Successes	Failures	Partial failures
China	5	5	0	0
France	12	12	0	0
Japan	1	0	1	0
Russia	32	31	1	0
Ukraine	7	5	2	0
United States	28	27	0	1
World	85	80	4	1

== Deep Space Rendezvous ==
Date (GMT)	Spacecraft	Event	Remarks
3 January	Galileo	12th flyby of Europa	
23 January	Cassini	Flyby of 2685 Masursky	
14 February	NEAR	First orbiter of asteroid; entered orbit of 433 Eros	
22 February	Galileo	3rd flyby of Io	
20 May	Galileo	5th flyby of Ganymede	
28 December	Galileo	6th flyby of Ganymede	
30 December	Cassini	Flyby of Jupiter	Gravity assist

== EVAs ==
Start date/time	Duration	End time	Spacecraft	Crew	Function	Remarks
12 May; 10:44	5 hours 3 minutes	15:47	Mir EO-28; Kvant-2	(Russia) Sergei Zalyotin (Russia) Alexander Kaleri	Tested a leak sealant and inspected a malfunctioning solar panel on Kvant-1. A final photographic record of the outer surfaces of Mir was made during a panorama-inspection.	Final EVA conducted from the Mir space station.
22 May; 01:48	6 hours 44 minutes	08:32	STS-101; ISS Atlantis	(United States) James S. Voss (United States) Jeffrey Williams	Inspected and secured the Orbital Replacement Unit Transfer Device, completed assembly of Strela cargo crane, and replaced one of Unity's two early communication antennas.	
11 September; 04:47	6 hours 14 minutes	11:01	STS-106; ISS Atlantis	(United States) Edward Lu (Russia) Yuri Malenchenko	Attached cabling that integrated the Zvezda module fully to the rest of the ISS, and constructed and attached a magnetometer that serves as a backup navigation system for the station.	
15 October; 14:27	6 hours 28 minutes	20:55	STS-92; ISS Discovery	(United States) Leroy Chiao (United States) William S. McArthur	Connected two sets of cables to provide power to heaters and conduits located on the Z1 truss, relocated two communication antenna assemblies, and installed a toolbox for use during future on-orbit construction.	
16 October; 14:15	7 hours 7 minutes	21:22	STS-92; ISS Discovery	(United States) Michael Lopez-Alegria (United States) Peter Wisoff	Installed the PMA-3 docking port, and prepared the Z1 truss for the installation of the solar arrays.	
17 October; 14:30	6 hours 48 minutes	21:18	STS-92; ISS Discovery	(United States) Leroy Chiao (United States) William S. McArthur	Installed two DC-to-DC converter units atop the Z1 truss.	
18 October; 15:00	6 hours 56 minutes	21:56	STS-92; ISS Discovery	(United States) Michael Lopez-Alegria (United States) Peter Wisoff	Removed a grapple fixture on the Z1 truss, deployed a Z1 utility tray, Manual Berthing Mechanism latches for Z1 were cycled and opened, and demonstrated the SAFER pack's abilities.	
3 December; 18:35	7 hours 33 minutes	4 December; 02:08	STS-97; ISS Endeavour	(United States) Joseph R. Tanner (United States) Carlos I. Noriega	Attached the P6 truss to the Z1 Truss, and prepared the solar arrays and radiator for deployment.	
5 December; 17:21	6 hours 37 minutes	23:58	STS-97; ISS Endeavour	(United States) Joseph R. Tanner (United States) Carlos I. Noriega	Configured the space station to use power from P6. Positioned the S-band antenna for use by the space station. Prepared the station for the arrival of Destiny.	
7 December; 16:13	5 hours 10 minutes	21:23	STS-97; ISS Endeavour	(United States) Joseph R. Tanner (United States) Carlos I. Noriega	Positioned a floating potential probe to measure the plasma field surrounding the space station, performed repair work to increase tension in the starboard solar array blankets that did not stretch out completely during deployment, and installed a centerline camera cable outside the Unity node.	
