= 2018 in spaceflight =

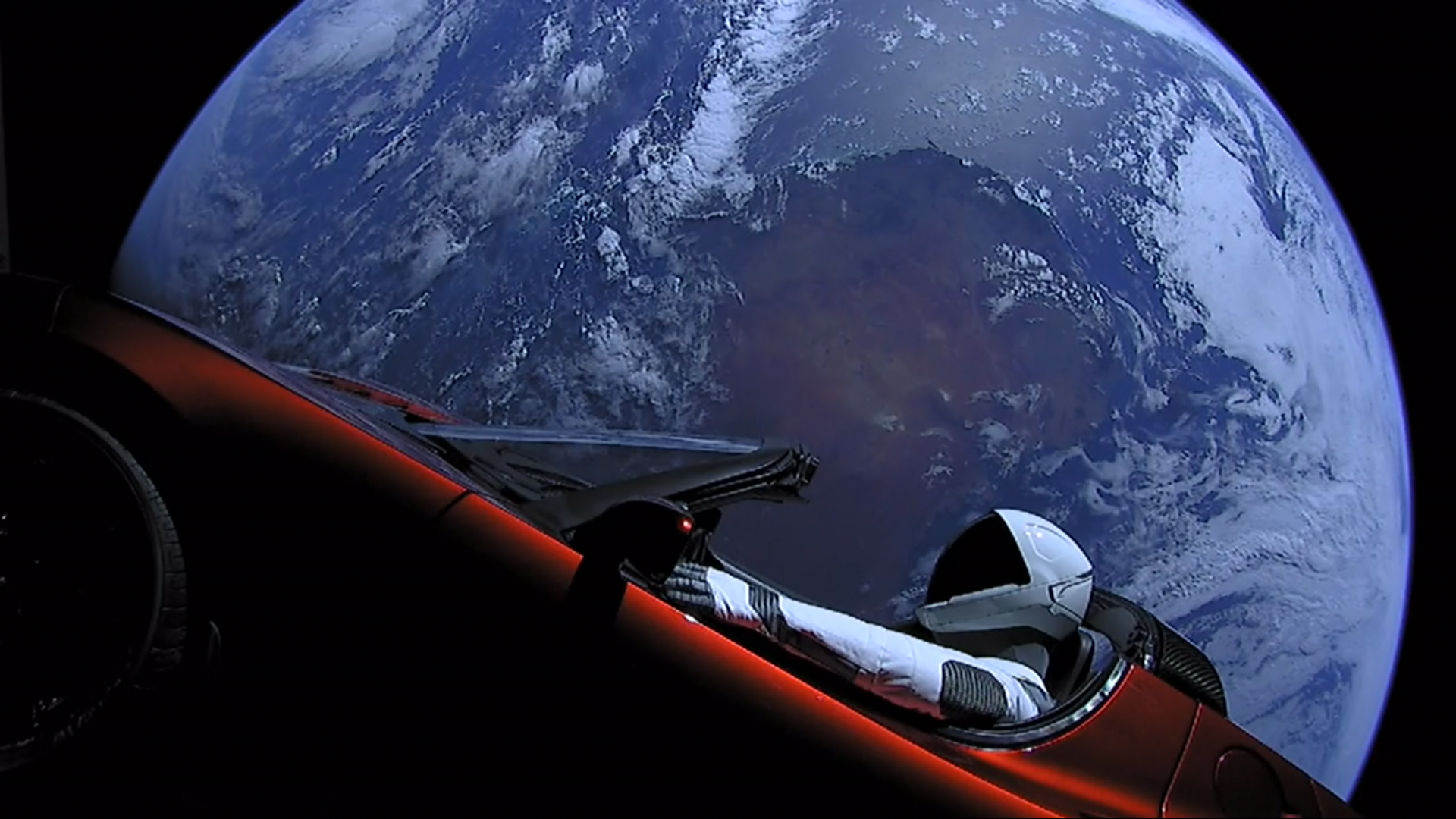
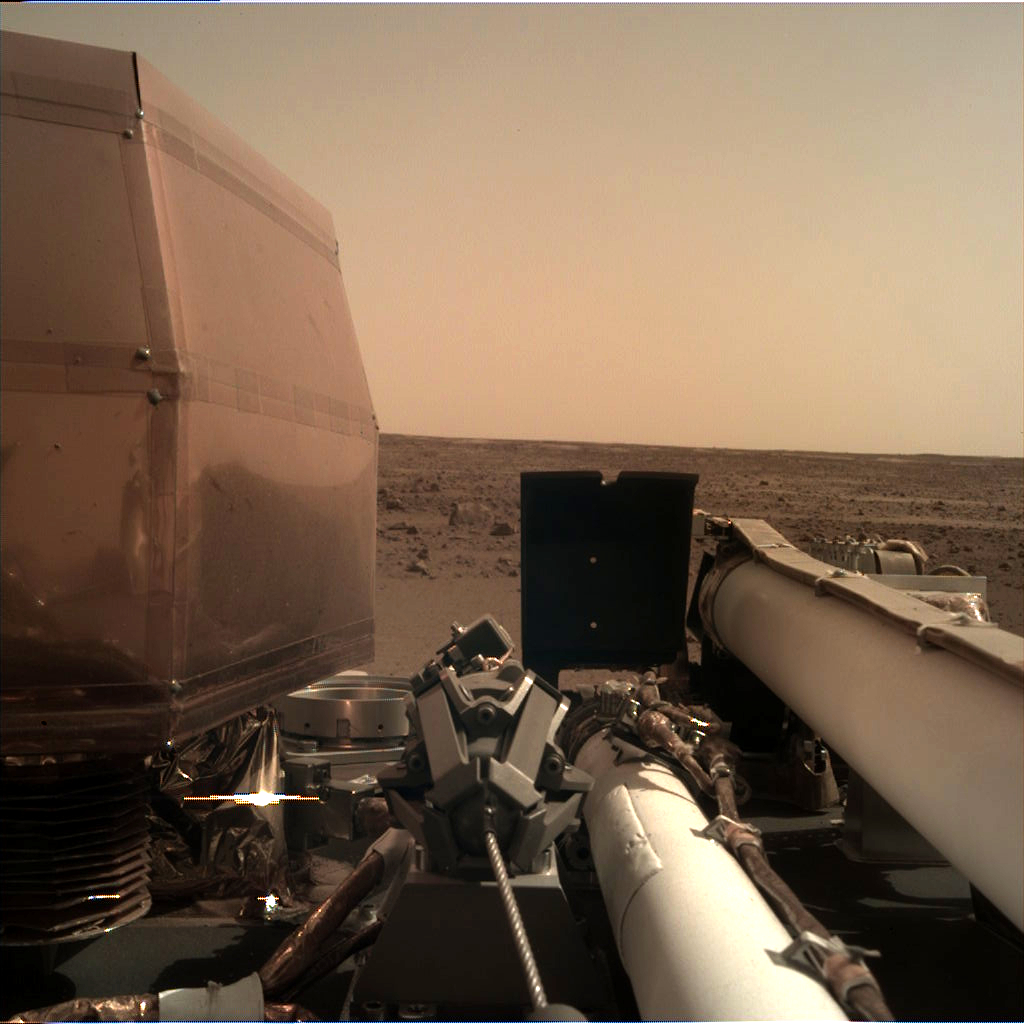
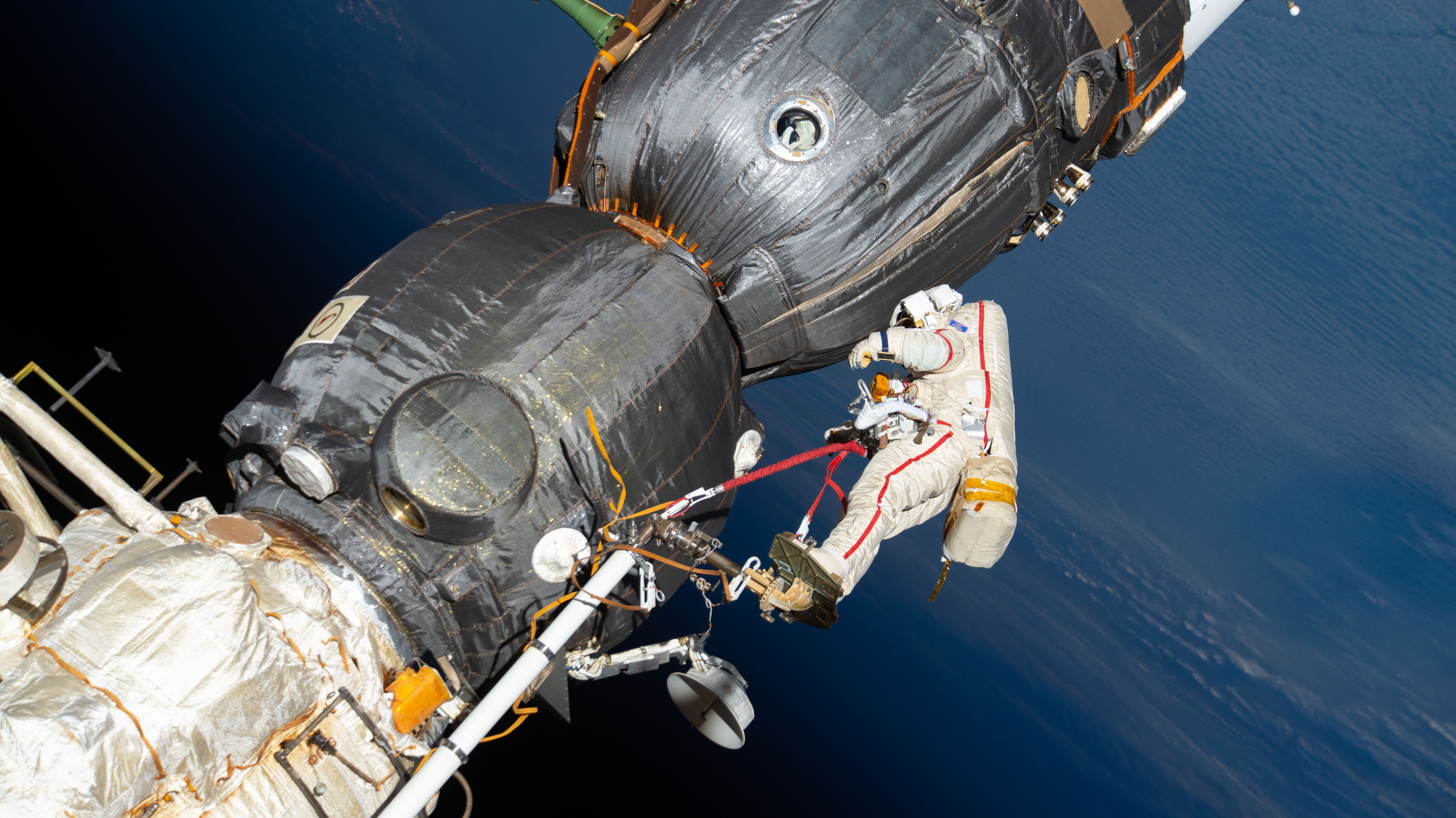
- Highlights from spaceflight in 2018 (Note: Clockwise from top: Elon Musk's Tesla Roadster, with "Starman" aboard, is launched from the Earth into heliocentric orbit following the successful maiden test flight of the Falcon Heavy.; Animation of photographs of 101955 Bennu taken by the PolyCam instrument aboard the OSIRIS-REx spacecraft.; Cosmonaut Oleg Kononenko inspects the exterior of the Soyuz MS-09 spacecraft, after the discovery of a 2 mm hole in the spacecraft that caused a temporary air leakage aboard the International Space Station.; First light of the Instrument Deployment Camera (IDC) aboard the InSight spacecraft, with the plains of Elysium Planitia in the background.)

Orbital launches
- First: 8 January
- Last: 29 December
- Total: 114
- Successes: 111
- Failures: 2
- Partial failures: 1
- Catalogued: 112

National firsts
- Satellite: New Zealand; Costa Rica; Kenya; Bhutan; Jordan
- Suborbital launch: Norway

Rockets
- Maiden flights: Falcon Heavy; Falcon 9 Block 5; Zhuque-1
- Retirements: Delta IV M+(5,2); SS-520; Falcon 9 Full Thrust; Falcon 9 Block 4; Ariane 5 ES; Delta II; Zhuque-1; Long March 3A

Crewed flights
- Orbital: 3 (+1 failed)
- Suborbital: 1 (private)
- Total travellers: 11 (+2 failed)
- EVAs: 8

2018 in spaceflight

This article documents notable spaceflight events during the year 2018. For the first time since 1990, more than 100 orbital launches were performed globally.

== Overview ==
=== Planetary exploration ===
The NASA InSight seismology probe was launched in May 2018 and landed on Mars in November. The Parker Solar Probe was launched to explore the Sun in August 2018, and reached its first perihelion in November, traveling faster than any prior spacecraft. On 20 October the ESA and JAXA launched BepiColombo to Mercury, on a 10-year mission featuring several flybys and eventually deploying two orbiters in 2025 for local study. The asteroid sampling mission Hayabusa2 reached its target Ryugu in June, and the similar OSIRIS-REx probe reached Bennu in December. China launched its Chang'e 4 lander/rover in December which performed the first ever soft landing on the far side of the Moon in January 2019; a communications relay was sent to the second Earth-Moon Lagrange point in May. The Google Lunar X Prize expired on 31 March without a winner for its $20 million grand prize, because none of its five finalist teams were able to launch a commercial lunar lander mission before the deadline.

=== Human spaceflight ===
The Soyuz MS-10 October mission to the International Space Station (ISS) was aborted shortly after launch, due to a separation failure of one of the rocket's side boosters. The crew landed safely, and was rescheduled for March 2019 on Soyuz MS-12. The United States returned to spaceflight on 13 December with the successful suborbital spaceflight of VSS Unity Flight VP-03. The flight did not reach the Kármán line (100 km) but it did cross the US definition of space (50 mi). As per United States convention, it was the first human spaceflight launched from the U.S. since the last Space shuttle flight STS-135 in 2011. Astronauts Mark P. Stucky and Frederick W. Sturckow both received their FAA Commercial Astronaut Wings on 7 February 2019. The return of the United States to human orbital spaceflight was further delayed to 2019, as Boeing and SpaceX, under NASA supervision, performed further tests on their commercial crew spacecraft under development: Starliner on Atlas V and SpaceX Dragon 2 on Falcon 9.

=== Rocket innovation ===
After a failed launch in 2017, the Electron rocket reached orbit with its second flight in January; manufactured by Rocket Lab, it is the first orbital rocket equipped with electric pump-fed engines. On 3 February, the Japanese SS-520-5 rocket (a modified sounding rocket) successfully delivered a 3U CubeSat to orbit, thus becoming the lightest and smallest orbital launch vehicle ever. On 6 February, SpaceX performed the much-delayed test flight of Falcon Heavy, carrying a car and a mannequin to a heliocentric orbit beyond Mars. Falcon Heavy became the most powerful active rocket until the maiden launch of the Space Launch System in 2022. On 27 October, LandSpace launched Zhuque-1, the first privately developed rocket in China; it failed to reach orbit. The company later announced that it would not repeat the launch attempt and shift its focus to the Zhuque-2 launch vehicle, making this the only launch attempt of Zhuque-1. On 13 December Virgin Galactic's SpaceShipTwo reached 82.7 km, below the internationally recognized Kármán line but above the 50-mile definition of space used by the U.S. Federal Aviation Administration.

=== Accelerating activity ===
The global activity of the launch industry grew significantly in 2018. 114 launches were conducted over the full year, compared with 91 in 2017, a 25% increase. Only three missions failed fully or partially in 2018, compared with eight failures in 2017. In August, China surpassed its previous record of 22 launches in 2016, and ended the year with a total 39 launches, also more launches than any other country in 2018. The 100th orbital launch of the year occurred on 3 December, exceeding all yearly tallies since the end of the Cold War space race in 1991.

== Orbital and suborbital launches ==
List of orbital launches
Month	Num. of successes	Num. of failures
January	13	0
February	8	0
March	10	0
April	9	0
May	7	0
June	8	0
July	8	0
August	4	0
September	8	0
October	11	2
November	13	0
December	15	0
Total	114	2

== Deep-space rendezvous ==
Date (GMT)	Spacecraft	Event	Remarks
7 February	Juno	11th perijove of Jupiter	
1 April	Juno	12th perijove	
17 May	TESS	Gravity assist by the Moon	Closest approach: 8,100 kilometres (5,000 mi)
24 May	Juno	13th perijove	
25 May	Queqiao	Moon flyby	In Earth–Moon L_{2} halo orbit
25 May	Longjiang-1	Moon flyby	Failed lunar orbital injection
25 May	Longjiang-2	Injection into Selenocentric orbit	Preliminary orbit was 350 × 13800 km, inclined 21° to the equator
27 June	Hayabusa2	Arrival at asteroid Ryugu	
16 July	Juno	14th perijove	
7 September	Juno	15th perijove	
21 September	HIBOU (ROVER-1A)	Landing on Ryugu	
21 September	OWL (ROVER-1B)	Landing on Ryugu	
3 October	MASCOT	Landing on Ryugu	
3 October	Parker Solar Probe	First gravity assist at Venus	
29 October	Juno	16th perijove	
6 November	Parker Solar Probe	First perihelion	Occurred at 03:28 UTC, a distance of 25 million km from the Sun. New record for the fastest spacecraft (95 km/s).
26 November	InSight	Arrival at Mars	Successful landing at Elysium Planitia, coordinates 4.5024°N 135.6234°E.
26 November	MarCO A, B	Mars flyby	Data relays for InSight lander
3 December	OSIRIS-REx	Arrival at asteroid Bennu	Approach phase operations began on 17 August
12 December	Chang'e 4	Injection into Selenocentric orbit	Preliminary orbit 100 × 400 km, en route to a landing attempt on the Lunar farside
21 December	Juno	17th perijove	

== Extravehicular activities (EVAs) ==
Start date/time	Duration	End time	Spacecraft	Crew	Remarks
23 January; 11:49	7 hours 24 minutes	19:13	Expedition 54; ISS Quest	(United States) Mark T. Vande Hei; (United States) Scott D. Tingle	Replacement of latching end effector-B (LEE-B) for the space station remote manipulator system (SSRMS)
2 February; 15:34	8 hours 13 minutes	23:47	Expedition 54; ISS Pirs	(Russia) Alexander Misurkin; (Russia) Anton Shkaplerov	Dismantling Lira electronics assembly; Installation of upgraded electronics unit; Jettisoning of removed unit; Test exposure unit retrieval; Biorisk retrieval; Foot restraint relocation
16 February; 12:00	5 hours 57 minutes	17:57	Expedition 54; ISS Quest	(United States) Mark T. Vande Hei; (Japan) Norishige Kanai	Finished removal and replacement of latching end effector on POA; Replaced LEE camera, installed ground strap on Canadarm2; Brought failed LEE inside; Lubricated Canadarm2; Moved tool platform on Dextre; Adjusted struts on flex hose rotary coupler
29 March; 13:33	6 hours 10 minutes	19:43	Expedition 55; ISS Quest	(United States) Richard R. Arnold; (United States) Andrew J. Feustel	Node 3 external wireless antenna install; P1 truss ammonia jumper remove (P1-3-2 RBVM); CP8 camera group replacement; S0 ammonia jumper relocate to ESP-1; APFR relocate to ESP-1; Bolt preps on ESP-2
16 May; 11:39	6 hours 31 minutes	18:10	Expedition 55; ISS Quest	(United States) Richard R. Arnold; (United States) Andrew J. Feustel	Relocation of two pump flow control subassembly (PFCS) units; Replace the camera port-13 (CP-13) external television camera group (ETVCG); Replacement of the space to ground transmit/receive controller (SGTRC)
14 June; 08:06	6 hours 49 minutes	14:55	Expedition 56; ISS Quest	(United States) Andrew J. Feustel; (United States) Richard R. Arnold	Installed new cameras to monitor the approach and docking maneuvers of commercial crew spacecraft; Replaced a defective camera and lighting on the right side of the station; Closed the cover of the Cloud Aerosol Transport System instrument
15 August; 16:17	7 hours 46 minutes	00:03 on 16 August	Expedition 56; ISS Pirs	(Russia) Oleg Artemyev; (Russia) Sergey Prokopyev	Deployed four cubesats built by Russian students; Installed antennas and cables for the Icarus animal-tracking device; Retrieved two materials exposure packages from the Zvezda hull
11 December; 15:59	7 hours 45 minutes	21:44	Expedition 57; ISS Pirs	(Russia) Oleg Kononenko; (Russia) Sergey Prokopyev	Inspected damage to the hull of Soyuz MS-09

== Space debris events ==
Date/Time (UTC)	Source object	Event type	Pieces tracked	Remarks
31 August	Centaur upper stage	Unknown	80	
22 December; 07:12	Orbcomm; OG1 FM 16	Satellite breakup	34+	Orbcomm OG1 sat FM 16 disintegrated for unknown reasons.

== Orbital launch statistics ==
=== By country ===
For the purposes of this section, the yearly tally of orbital launches by country assigns each flight to the country of origin of the rocket, not to the launch services provider or the spaceport. As examples, Soyuz launches by Arianespace in Kourou are counted under Russia because Soyuz-2 is a Russian rocket.

Country	Launches	Successes	Failures	Partial failures
China	39 (Note: China surpassed its previous record of 22 launches in 2016)	38	1 (Note: The only failure was the maiden flight of private rocket Zhuque-1.)	0
France	6	5	0	1 (Note: During Ariane 5 flight VA241 in January, two launched satellites were placed on an off-nominal orbit.)
India	7	7 (Note: GSAT-6A launch was a success, but the satellite failed.)	0	0
Italy	2	2	0	0
Japan	6	6	0	0
Russia	20 (Note: Includes three European Soyuz launches from Kourou, French Guiana by Arianespace.)	19	1 (Note: Crewed Soyuz MS-10 launch failure, two cosmonauts landed safely.)	0
United States	34 (Note: Includes Electron launches from Māhia)	34 (Note: In January, Zuma launch was a success, satellite was reported lost but actual status is classified.)	0	0
World	114	111	2	1

=== By rocket ===
- Antares 200
- Ariane 5
- Atlas V
- Delta II
- Delta IV
- Delta IV Heavy
- Electron
- Falcon 9 new
- Falcon 9 reused
- Falcon Heavy
- GSLV Mk II
- H-IIA
- H-IIB
- Long March 2
- Long March 3
- Long March 4
- Long March 11
- PSLV
- Soyuz-FG
- Soyuz-2 (Russia)
- Soyuz-ST (Europe)
- Proton-M
- Rokot
- Vega
- Others

==== By family ====
Family	Country	Launches	Successes	Failures	Partial failures	Remarks
Antares	United States	2	2	0	0	
Ariane	France	6	5	0	1	
Atlas	United States	5	5	0	0	
Delta	United States	3	3	0	0	
Electron	United States	3	3	0	0	
Epsilon	Japan	1	1	0	0	
Falcon	United States	21	21	0	0	
GSLV	India	2	2	0	0	
GSLV Mk III	India	1	1	0	0	
H-II	Japan	4	4	0	0	
Kuaizhou	China	1	1	0	0	
Long March	China	37	37	0	0	
PSLV	India	4	4	0	0	
R-7	Russia	16	15	1	0	
S-Series	Japan	1	1	0	0	Final orbital flight
Universal Rocket	Russia	4	4	0	0	
Vega	Italy	2	2	0	0	
Zhuque	China	1	0	1	0	Maiden flight

==== By type ====
Rocket	Country	Family	Launches	Successes	Failures	Partial failures	Remarks
Antares 200	United States	Antares	2	2	0	0	
Ariane 5	France	Ariane	6	5	0	1	
Atlas V	United States	Atlas	5	5	0	0	
Delta II	United States	Delta	1	1	0	0	Final flight
Delta IV	United States	Delta	2	2	0	0	
Electron	United States	Electron	3	3	0	0	
Epsilon	Japan	Epsilon	1	1	0	0	
Falcon 9	United States	Falcon	21	21	0	0	
GSLV	India	GSLV	2	2	0	0	
GSLV Mk III	India	GSLV Mk III	1	1	0	0	
H-IIA	Japan	H-II	3	3	0	0	
H-IIB	Japan	H-II	1	1	0	0	
Kuaizhou 1	China	Kuaizhou	1	1	0	0	
Long March 2	China	Long March	14	14	0	0	
Long March 3	China	Long March	14	14	0	0	
Long March 4	China	Long March	6	6	0	0	
Long March 11	China	Long March	3	3	0	0	
Proton	Russia	Universal Rocket	2	2	0	0	
PSLV	India	PSLV	4	4	0	0	
Soyuz	Russia	R-7	5	4	1	0	
Soyuz-2 or ST	Russia	R-7	11	11	0	0	
SS-520	Japan	S-Series	1	1	0	0	Final orbital flight
UR-100	Russia	Universal Rocket	2	2	0	0	
Vega	Italy	Vega	2	2	0	0	
Zhuque-1	China	Zhuque	1	0	1	0	Only flight

==== By configuration ====
Rocket	Country	Type	Launches	Successes	Failures	Partial failures	Remarks
Antares 230	United States	Antares 200	2	2	0	0	
Ariane 5 ECA	France	Ariane 5	5	4	0	1	
Ariane 5 ES	France	Ariane 5	1	1	0	0	Final flight
Atlas V 401	United States	Atlas V	1	1	0	0	
Atlas V 411	United States	Atlas V	1	1	0	0	
Atlas V 541	United States	Atlas V	1	1	0	0	
Atlas V 551	United States	Atlas V	2	2	0	0	
Delta II 7420	United States	Delta II	1	1	0	0	Final flight
Delta IV Medium+ (5,2)	United States	Delta IV	1	1	0	0	Final flight
Delta IV Heavy	United States	Delta IV	1	1	0	0	
Epsilon	Japan	Epsilon	1	1	0	0	
Electron	United States	Electron	3	3	0	0	
Falcon 9 Full Thrust	United States	Falcon 9	10	10	0	0	Final flight
Falcon 9 Block 5	United States	Falcon 9	10	10	0	0	Maiden flight
Falcon Heavy	United States	Falcon 9	1	1	0	0	Maiden flight
GSLV Mk II	India	GSLV	2	2	0	0	
GSLV Mk III	India	GSLV Mk III	1	1	0	0	
H-IIA 202	Japan	H-IIA	3	3	0	0	
H-IIA 204	Japan	H-IIA	0	0	0	0	
H-IIB	Japan	H-IIB	1	1	0	0	
Kuaizhou 1A	China	Kuaizhou	1	1	0	0	
Long March 2C	China	Long March 2	6	6	0	0	
Long March 2D	China	Long March 2	8	8	0	0	
Long March 3A	China	Long March 3	2	2	0	0	
Long March 3B/E	China	Long March 3	3	3	0	0	
Long March 3B/E / YZ-1	China	Long March 3	8	8	0	0	
Long March 3C/E	China	Long March 3	1	1	0	0	
Long March 4B	China	Long March 4	2	2	0	0	
Long March 4C	China	Long March 4	4	4	0	0	
Long March 11	China	Long March 11	3	3	0	0	
Proton-M / Briz-M	Russia	Proton	2	2	0	0	
PSLV-CA	India	PSLV	2	2	0	0	
PLSV-XL	India	PSLV	2	2	0	0	
Rokot / Briz-KM	Russia	UR-100	2	2	0	0	
Soyuz-FG	Russia	Soyuz	5	4	1	0	
Soyuz-2.1a or ST-A	Russia	Soyuz-2	2	2	0	0	
Soyuz-2.1a or ST-A / Fregat-M	Russia	Soyuz-2	2	2	0	0	
Soyuz-2.1b or ST-B	Russia	Soyuz-2	1	1	0	0	
Soyuz-2.1b or ST-B / Fregat-M	Russia	Soyuz-2	4	4	0	0	
Soyuz-2.1b or ST-B / Fregat-MT	Russia	Soyuz-2	1	1	0	0	
Soyuz-2-1v / Volga	Russia	Soyuz-2	1	1	0	0	
SS-520-5	Japan	SS-520	1	1	0	0	Final orbital flight
Vega	Italy	Vega	2	2	0	0	
Zhuque-1	China	Zhuque-1	1	0	1	0	Only flight

=== By spaceport ===
- Jiuquan
- Taiyuan
- Xichang
- Kourou
- Satish Dhawan
- Tanegashima
- Uchinoura
- Baikonur
- Mahia
- Plesetsk
- Vostochny
- Cape Canaveral
- Kennedy
- MARS
- Vandenberg

Site	Country	Launches	Successes	Failures	Partial failures	Remarks
Baikonur	Kazakhstan	9	8	1	0	
Cape Canaveral	United States	17	16	1	0	
Jiuquan	China	16	15	1	0	
Kennedy	United States	3	3	0	0	
Kourou	France	11	10	0	1	
Mahia	New Zealand	3	3	0	0	
MARS	United States	2	2	0	0	
Plesetsk	Russia	6	6	0	0	
Satish Dhawan	India	7	7	0	0	
Taiyuan	China	6	6	0	0	
Tanegashima	Japan	4	4	0	0	
Uchinoura	Japan	2	2	0	0	
Vandenberg	United States	9	9	0	0	
Vostochny	Russia	2	2	0	0	
Xichang	China	17	17	0	0	
Total		114	110	3	1	

=== By orbit ===
- Low Earth
- Low Earth (ISS)
- Low Earth (SSO)
- Low Earth (retrograde)
- Medium Earth
- Geosychronous (transfer)
- High Earth
- Heliocentric

Orbital regime	Launches	Achieved	Not achieved	Accidentally achieved	Remarks
Transatmospheric	0	0	0	0	
Low Earth / Sun-synchronous	67	64	3	0	Zuma, Soyuz MS-10 and Zhuque-1 lost
Geosynchronous / GTO	27	26	0	1	Ariane VA241 underperformed
Medium Earth	13	13	0	0	
High Earth / Lunar transfer	3	3	0	0	
Heliocentric / Planetary transfer	4	4	0	0	
Total	114	110	3	1	
