= Reflector (microsatellite) =

Russian Space debris research microsatellite

Reflector (USA-163) is a space debris research microsatellite built in Russia by NII KP for the United States Air Force Research Lab at Kirtland AFB.

There was some confusion about whether or not the USA-163 designation had actually ever been assigned, which stemmed from the fact that more than one microsatellite may fly on a given launch vehicle. A single modern launch may result in multiple maneuvering spacecraft reaching different final orbits (for example, some CubeSats, and the satellites of SpaceX's StarLink system).
