= PRISMA (spacecraft) =

Italian Earth observation satellite

- Mission type: Earth observation Technology
- Operator: (Italy) ASI
- COSPAR ID: 2019-015A
- SATCAT no.: 44072
- Website: prisma-i.it
- Mission duration: 5 years (planned); 6 years, 6 months and 18 days (elasped)

Spacecraft properties
- Manufacturer: Leonardo; OHB Italia
- Launch mass: 830 kilograms (1,830 lb)
- Dimensions: 1.75 m x 1.54 m x 3.4 m
- Power: 350 W (avg.) 700 W (max)

Start of mission
- Launch date: 22 March 2019, 01:50:35 UTC
- Rocket: Vega
- Launch site: Kourou ELV
- Contractor: Arianespace

Orbital parameters
- Reference system: Geocentric
- Regime: Sun-Synchronous Orbit
- Eccentricity: 0
- Apogee altitude: 614 km (382 mi)
- Inclination: 98.19 degrees
- Period: 99 minutes
- Mean motion: 15
- Repeat interval: 29 days
- Epoch: Planned

Transponders
- Band: S Band (tracking/control); X band (data transmission)
- Frequency: 9.6 GHz
- Bandwidth: 155 Mbit/s

PRISMA (PRecursore IperSpettrale della Missione Applicativa, Hyperspectral PRecursor of the Application Mission) is an Italian Space Agency pre-operational and technology demonstrator mission focused on the development and delivery of hyperspectral products and the qualification of the hyperspectral payload in space.

== Overview ==
PRISMA is an Earth observation satellite with innovative electro-optical instrumentation which combines a hyperspectral sensor with a medium-resolution panchromatic camera collecting images at 30 m resolution within 30 km x 30 km scenes. The advantages of this combination are that in addition to the classical capability of observation based on the recognition of the geometrical characteristics of the scene, there is the one offered by hyperspectral sensors which can determine the chemical-physical composition of objects present on the scene. This offers the scientific community and users many applications in the field of environmental monitoring, resource management, crop classification, pollution control, etc. Further applications are possible even in the field of National Security.

PRISMA is a program completely funded by ASI and is a follow on of the cancelled HypSEO mission. The satellite was launched on 22 March 2019 aboard a Vega rocket.

== Scientific objectives ==
- Implementation of an Earth Observation pre-operative mission.
- In orbit demonstration and qualification of an Italian state-of-the-art hyperspectral/panchromatic technology.
- Validation of end-to-end data processing able to develop new applications of spectral resolution images.
- Capitalization of ASI heritage, specifically canceled HypSEO mission and Italian-Canadian Joint Hyperspectral Mission (JHM).

== Payload ==
The Hyperspectral / Panchromatic payload is derived from HypSEO and updated as for the JHM study:

- PRISMA (Hyperspectral and Panchromatic instrument): a prism spectrometer composed of the Hyp/Pan camera, an optical head and the main electronics box. The design is based on a pushbroom sensor type observation concept providing hyperspectral imagery (~ 250 bands) at a spatial resolution of 30 m on a swath of 30 km. The spectral resolution is better than 12 nm in a spectral range of 400-2500 nm (VNIR and SWIR regions). In parallel, Pan (Panchromatic) imagery is provided at a spatial resolution of 5 m; the Pan data is co-registered with the Hyp (Hyperspectral) data to permit testing of image fusion techniques.
- Internal Calibration Unit (ICU): an instrument designed to allow the support of absolute and relative radiometric calibrations and spectral calibrations.
- Payload Data Handling and Transmission: This subsystem, of COSMO-SkyMed heritage, is dedicated to the processing of the payload data for the X band downlink to the CGS of Matera.

== See also ==
- COSMO-SkyMed
- HySIS
- EnMAP
