= EnMAP =

German hyperspectral satellite launched in 2022

EnMAP (Environmental Mapping and Analysis Program) is a German hyperspectral satellite mission to provide high accuracy hyperspectral image data of the Earth surface on a timely and frequent basis.

== Overview ==
Environmental Mapping and Analysis Program EnMAP is a German hyperspectral satellite mission to provide high accuracy hyperspectral image data of the Earth surface on a timely and frequent basis. It records data via a Sun-synchronous orbit at a height of 653 km above the Earth. The satellite provides a high resolution hyperspectral imager capable of resolving 230 spectral bands from 420 to 2450 nm with a ground resolution of 30 m x 30 m. The swath width amounts to 30 km at a maximum swath length of up to 5000 km a day. The off-nadir (+/- 30°) pointing feature enables fast target revisit of 4 days.

EnMAP is designed to record bio-physical, biochemical and geochemical variables on a global basis to increase understanding of biospheric and geospheric processes and to ensure the sustainability of our resources.

== Administration ==
The Space Agency of the German Aerospace Center manages the mission Under the scientific lead of the German Research Centre for Geosciences in Potsdam. the German Aerospace Center developed and operates The ground segment. The hyperspectral imager was developed by OHB-System AG which is also responsible for the development of the satellite bus.

EnMAP was launched on 1 April 2022 on a Falcon 9 Block 5 booster as part of the Transporter-4 rideshare mission.

== See also ==
- HySIS - Indian Hyper-spectral imaging satellite.
