= Eutelsat 36A =

French communications satellite

- Names: Eutelsat 3 F-4; Eutelsat W4 (2000–2012); Eutelsat 36A (2012–2016); Eutelsat 70C (2016) (2018–2019); Eutelsat 80A (2017–2018); Eutelsat 748E (2019–present)
- Mission type: Communications
- Operator: Eutelsat Communications
- COSPAR ID: 2000-028A
- SATCAT no.: 26369
- Website: www.eutelsat.com/en/home.html
- Mission duration: 12 years (planned); 26 years, 4 months and 16 days (in progress)

Spacecraft properties
- Spacecraft: Eutelsat W4
- Spacecraft type: Spacebus
- Bus: Spacebus-3000B2
- Manufacturer: Alcatel Space
- Launch mass: 3,190 kg (7,030 lb)
- Dry mass: 1,285 kg (2,833 lb)

Start of mission
- Launch date: 24 May 2000, 23:10:05 UTC
- Rocket: Atlas IIIA (AC-201)
- Launch site: Cape Canaveral, SLC-36B
- Contractor: Lockheed Martin Astronautics
- Entered service: July 2000

Orbital parameters
- Reference system: Geocentric orbit
- Regime: Geostationary orbit
- Longitude: 36° East (2000–2016); 70.5° East (2016); 88.5° East (2017); 80.5° East (2017–2018); 12.7° West (2018–2019); 70.3° East (2019); 48° East (2019–present)

Transponders
- Band: 31 Ku-Band
- Coverage area: Africa, Russia

Eutelsat 36A (formerly Eutelsat W4 and Eutelsat 3 F-4) is a French communications satellite operated by Eutelsat Communications. It was constructed by Alcatel Space and is based on the Spacebus-3000B2 satellite bus.

== Launch ==
Eutelsat W4 was launched on the maiden flight of the Atlas III launch vehicle, which used the Atlas IIIA configuration. The launch was contracted by International Launch Services (ILS), and occurred on 24 May 2000, at 23:10:05 UTC from Space Launch Complex 36B at the Cape Canaveral Air Force Station (CCAFS).

== Eutelsat W4 ==
Following its launch and on-orbit testing, it was placed in geostationary orbit at 36° East, from where it provides communications services to Russia and Africa. It carries thirty-one transponders, and has an expected on-orbit lifespan of 12 years.

== Eutelsat 36A ==
In December 2011, Eutelsat announced, that their satellite assets will be renamed under a unified brand name effective from March 2012. This satellite became Eutelsat 36A.

== Eutelsat 70C ==
Eutelsat 70C at 70.5° East in 2016 and at 70.3° East in 2018–2019.

== Eutelsat 80A ==
Eutelsat 80A at 80.5° East in 2017–2018.

== Eutelsat 48E ==
Eutelsat 48E at 48° East since 2019.
