= List of spaceflight launches in January–June 2018 =

This article lists orbital and suborbital launches during the first half of the year 2018.

For all other spaceflight activities, see 2018 in spaceflight. For launches in the second half of 2018 see List of spaceflight launches in July–December 2018.

== Orbital launches ==
- ← Jan
- Feb
- Mar
- Apr
- May
- Jun
- Jul
- Aug
- Sep
- Oct
- Nov
- Dec →

Date and time (UTC)	Rocket	Flight number	Launch site		LSP	
Date and time (UTC)	Payload (⚀ = CubeSat)	Operator	Orbit	Function	Decay (UTC)	Outcome
Date and time (UTC)	Remarks					
=== January ===
8 January; 01:00	(United States) Falcon 9 Block 4	F9-047	(United States) Cape Canaveral SLC-40		(United States) SpaceX	
8 January; 01:00	(United States) Zuma / USA-280	Unnamed U.S. government agency	Low Earth	Classified	8 January	Nominal launch; Deployment failure
8 January; 01:00	After an initial lack of official comment on the mission, a preliminary report concludes that the payload adapter manufactured by Northrop Grumman failed to separate the satellite from the second stage, resulting in its re-entry shortly after launch. SpaceX and the United States Air Force reviewed the Falcon 9 flight data and saw no issues with the launch vehicle itself that would affect future launches.					
9 January; 03:24	(China) Long March 2D	2D-Y40	(China) Taiyuan LC-9		(China) CASC	
9 January; 03:24	(China) SuperView / Gaojing-1 03	Beijing Space View Technology	Low Earth (SSO)	Earth observation	In orbit	Operational
9 January; 03:24	(China) SuperView / Gaojing-1 04	Beijing Space View Technology	Low Earth (SSO)	Earth observation	In orbit	Operational
11 January; 23:18	(China) Long March 3B / YZ-1	3B-Y45	(China) Xichang LC-2		(China) CASC	
11 January; 23:18	(China) BeiDou-3 M7	CNSA	Medium Earth	Navigation	In orbit	Operational
11 January; 23:18	(China) BeiDou-3 M8	CNSA	Medium Earth	Navigation	In orbit	Operational
12 January; 03:58	(India) PSLV-XL	C40	(India) Satish Dhawan FLP		(India) ISRO	
12 January; 03:58	(India) Cartosat-2F	ISRO	Low Earth (SSO)	Earth observation	In orbit	Operational
12 January; 03:58	(Finland) ICEYE X1	ICEYE	Low Earth (SSO)	Technology demonstration	In orbit	Operational
12 January; 03:58	(India) Microsat-TD	ISRO	Low Earth (SSO)	Technology demonstration	27 November 2020	Successful
12 January; 03:58	⚀ (United States) Arkyd-6A	Planetary Resources	Low Earth (SSO)	Technology demonstration	In orbit	Operational
12 January; 03:58	⚀ (South Korea) CANYVAL-X 1, 2	Yonsei University, NASA	Low Earth (SSO)	Technology demonstration	In orbit	Operational
12 January; 03:58	⚀ (United Kingdom) Carbonite-2	Surrey Satellite Technology	Low Earth (SSO)	Technology demonstration	In orbit	Operational
12 January; 03:58	⚀ (United States) CICERO 7	GeoOptics	Low Earth (SSO)	Earth observation	14 November 2023	Successful
12 January; 03:58	⚀ (South Korea) CNUSail-1	CNU	Low Earth (SSO)	Technology demonstration	In orbit	Operational
12 January; 03:58	⚀ (United States) DemoSat 2	Astranis	Low Earth (SSO)	Technology demonstration (radio)	In orbit	Operational
12 January; 03:58	⚀ (United States) Flock-3p' × 4	Planet Labs	Low Earth (SSO)	Earth observation	First: 28 March 2023; Last: 17 August 2023	Successful
12 January; 03:58	⚀ (United States) Fox-1D	AMSAT	Low Earth (SSO)	Technology demonstration	In orbit	Operational
12 January; 03:58	⚀ (India) INS-1C	ISRO	Low Earth (SSO)	Technology demonstration	14 November 2023	Successful
12 January; 03:58	⚀ (South Korea) KAUSAT 5	Korea Aerospace University	Low Earth (SSO)	Technology demonstration	In orbit	Operational
12 January; 03:58	⚀ (United States) Landmapper-BC 3 v2	Astro Digital	Low Earth (SSO)	Earth observation	In orbit	Operational
12 January; 03:58	⚀ (United States) Lemur-2 × 4	Spire Global	Low Earth (SSO)	Earth observation	First: 5 April 2023; Last: 9 May 2023	Successful
12 January; 03:58	⚀ (Canada) LEO Vantage 1	Telesat	Low Earth (SSO)	Communications	In orbit	Operational
12 January; 03:58	⚀ (United States) MicroMAS 2a	MIT SSL	Low Earth (SSO)	Technology demonstration	8 April 2023	Successful
12 January; 03:58	⚀ (France) PicSat	Paris Observatory	Low Earth (SSO)	Astronomy	3 October 2023	Successful
12 January; 03:58	⚀ (United States) SpaceBEE 1–4	Swarm Technologies	Low Earth (SSO)	Communications	SpaceBEE 1: 2 August 2022; SpaceBEE 2: 6 September 2022; SpaceBEE 3: 3 October 2022; SpaceBEE 4: In orbit	Operational
12 January; 03:58	⚀ (South Korea) STEP Cube Lab	Chosun University	Low Earth (SSO)	Technology demonstration	23 May 2023	Successful
12 January; 03:58	⚀ (United States) Tyvak 61C	Tyvak Nano-Satellite Systems	Low Earth (SSO)	Astronomy	8 April 2023	Successful
12 January; 03:58	Deployed 31 satellites.					
12 January; 22:11	(United States) Delta IV M+(5,2)	D-379	(United States) Vandenberg SLC-6		(United States) ULA	
12 January; 22:11	(United States) Topaz-5 / USA-281	US Air Force	LEO (retrograde)	Reconnaissance	In orbit	Operational
12 January; 22:11	NROL-47 mission. Last flight of Delta IV M+(5,2) variant.					
13 January; 07:20	(China) Long March 2D	2D-Y49	(China) Jiuquan SLS-2		(China) CASC	
13 January; 07:20	(China) LKW-3	CAS	Low Earth	Earth observation	In orbit	Operational
17 January; 21:06:11	(Japan) Epsilon	Epsilon-3	(Japan) Uchinoura		(Japan) JAXA	
17 January; 21:06:11	(Japan) ASNARO-2	NEC	Low Earth (SSO)	Earth observation	In orbit	Operational
19 January; 04:12	(China) Long March 11	Y3	(China) Jiuquan LS-95A		(China) CASC	
19 January; 04:12	(China) Jilin-1 Video-07 (Deqing 1)	Chang Guang Satellite Technology	Low Earth (SSO)	Earth observation	In orbit	Operational
19 January; 04:12	(China) Jilin-1 Video-08 (Linye 2)	Chang Guang Satellite Technology	Low Earth (SSO)	Earth observation	In orbit	Operational
19 January; 04:12	⚀ (China) Star of Enlai; Huai'an Hao	Huai'an Youth Comprehensive Development Base	Low Earth (SSO)	Technology/Education	In orbit	Operational
19 January; 04:12	⚀ (China) Xiaoxiang 2	SpaceTY Aerospace Co.	Low Earth (SSO)	Stabilization technology	In orbit	Operational
19 January; 04:12	⚀ (China) Quantutong-1 (QTT-1)	Full-chart Location Network Co. (Quan Tu Tong Co.)	Low Earth (SSO)	Communications	In orbit	Operational
19 January; 04:12	⚀ (Canada) KIPP	Kepler Communications	Low Earth (SSO)	Communications	In orbit	Operational
19 January; 04:12	100th launch from Jiuquan. Carried and deployed 6 satellites in total.					
20 January; 00:48	(United States) Atlas V 411	AV-076	(United States) Cape Canaveral SLC-41		(United States) ULA	
20 January; 00:48	(United States) SBIRS GEO-4 (USA-282)	U.S. Air Force	Geosynchronous	Missile warning	In orbit	Operational
21 January; 01:30	(United States) Electron	"Still Testing"	(New Zealand) Mahia LC-1A		(United States) Rocket Lab	
21 January; 01:30	(New Zealand) Humanity Star	Rocket Lab	Low Earth	Public awareness	22 March 2018	Successful
21 January; 01:30	⚀ (United States) Flock-2 (Dove Pioneer)	Planet Labs	Low Earth	Earth observation	22 September 2019	Successful
21 January; 01:30	⚀ (United States) Lemur-2-72	Spire Global	Low Earth	Earth observation	9 November 2023	Successful
21 January; 01:30	⚀ (United States) Lemur-2-73	Spire Global	Low Earth	Earth observation	22 August 2023	Successful
21 January; 01:30	First successful launch of the Electron rocket.					
25 January; 05:39	(China) Long March 2C	2C-Y36	(China) Xichang LC-3		(China) CASC	
25 January; 05:39	(China) Yaogan 30-04A	CAS	Low Earth	Reconnaissance	In orbit	Operational
25 January; 05:39	(China) Yaogan 30-04B	CAS	Low Earth	Reconnaissance	In orbit	Operational
25 January; 05:39	(China) Yaogan 30-04C	CAS	Low Earth	Reconnaissance	In orbit	Operational
25 January; 05:39	⚀ (China) Weina 1A / NanoSat-1A	Shanghai Micro Satellite Engineering Center	Low Earth	Technology demonstration	In orbit	Operational
25 January; 22:20	(France) Ariane 5 ECA	VA241	(France) Kourou ELA-3		(France) Arianespace	
25 January; 22:20	(Luxembourg) SES-14 / (United States) GOLD	SES S.A.	Geosynchronous	Communications	In orbit	Partial launch failure / Operational
25 January; 22:20	(United Arab Emirates) Al Yah-3	Yahsat	Geosynchronous	Communications	In orbit	Partial launch failure / Operational
25 January; 22:20	Due to programming errors in the Guidance, Navigation and Control (GNC) the satellites were placed on an off-nominal orbit. Both payloads are undergoing corrective maneuvers and will be on line in August 2018. These failures have ended the Ariane 5 record series of 82 successful launches in a row from April 2003 to December 2017.					
31 January; 21:25	(United States) Falcon 9 Full Thrust	F9-048	(United States) Cape Canaveral SLC-40		(United States) SpaceX	
31 January; 21:25	(Luxembourg) SES-16 / GovSat-1	SES S.A.	Geosynchronous	Communications	In orbit	Operational
31 January; 21:25	This flight re-used booster B1032 recovered from the NROL-76 mission in May 2017, and landed the first stage in the ocean with the intent to expend it. The booster unexpectedly remained intact, but was not recovered, and it was subsequently destroyed.					
← Jan; Feb; Mar; Apr; May; Jun; Jul; Aug; Sep; Oct; Nov; Dec →; === February ===
1 February; 02:07	(Russia) Soyuz-2.1a / Fregat-M		(Russia) Vostochny Site 1S		(Russia) Roscosmos	
1 February; 02:07	(Russia) Kanopus-V №3	Roscosmos	Low Earth (SSO)	Earth observation	In orbit	Operational
1 February; 02:07	(Russia) Kanopus-V №4	Roscosmos	Low Earth (SSO)	Earth observation	In orbit	Operational
1 February; 02:07	⚀ (Germany) S-Net 1–4	TU Berlin	Low Earth (SSO)	Technology demonstration (inter-satellite communications)	In orbit	Operational
1 February; 02:07	⚀ (United States) Lemur-2 × 4	Spire Global	Low Earth	Earth observation	In orbit	Operational
1 February; 02:07	⚀ (Germany) D-Star One v.1.1 Phoenix	German Orbital Systems	Low Earth (SSO)	Communications (experimental)		
2 February; 07:50	(China) Long March 2D	2D-Y13	(China) Jiuquan SLS-2		(China) CASC	
2 February; 07:50	(China) (Italy) CSES / Zhangheng-1	CNSA / ASI	Low Earth (SSO)	Earth observation	In orbit	Operational
2 February; 07:50	⚀ (China) Fengmaniu 1	CNSA	Low Earth (SSO)	Earth observation	16 March 2023	Successful
2 February; 07:50	⚀ (Denmark) GOMX 4A	GOMSpace, Danish Ministry of Defence	Low Earth (SSO)	Technology demonstration	In orbit	Operational
2 February; 07:50	⚀ (Denmark) GOMX 4B	GOMSpace, ESA	Low Earth (SSO)	Technology demonstration	In orbit	Operational
2 February; 07:50	⚀ (Argentina) ÑuSat 4	Satellogic	Low Earth (SSO)	Earth observation	In orbit	Operational
2 February; 07:50	⚀ (Argentina) ÑuSat 5	Satellogic	Low Earth (SSO)	Earth observation	In orbit	Operational
2 February; 07:50	⚀ (China) Shaonian Xing	China Association for Science and Technology	Low Earth (SSO)	Communications	In orbit	Operational
3 February; 05:03	(Japan) SS-520		(Japan) Uchinoura		(Japan) JAXA	
3 February; 05:03	⚀ (Japan) TRICOM-1R	University of Tokyo	Low Earth	Technology demonstration	21 August 2018	Successful
3 February; 05:03	The smallest rocket to successfully launch a satellite. Re-flight after a launch failure in January 2017.					
6 February; 20:45	(United States) Falcon Heavy	FH-001	(United States) Kennedy LC-39A		(United States) SpaceX	
6 February; 20:45	(United States) Elon Musk's Tesla Roadster	SpaceX	Heliocentric	Flight test	In orbit	Successful
6 February; 20:45	Maiden test flight of Falcon Heavy re-using two first-stage boosters. The two side boosters successfully touched down at the landing zones in Cape Canaveral, however the middle booster failed to land on the automated drone ship. The test payload was launched in a heliocentric orbit with an aphelion of 1.70 AU, just beyond the orbit of Mars.					
12 February; 05:10	(China) Long March 3B / YZ-1	3B-Y47	(China) Xichang LC-2		(China) CASC	
12 February; 05:10	(China) BeiDou-3 M3	CNSA	Medium Earth	Navigation	In orbit	Operational
12 February; 05:10	(China) BeiDou-3 M4	CNSA	Medium Earth	Navigation	In orbit	Operational
13 February; 08:13	(Russia) Soyuz-2.1a		(Kazakhstan) Baikonur Site 31/6		(Russia) Roscosmos	
13 February; 08:13	(Russia) Progress MS-08 / 69P	Roscosmos	Low Earth (ISS)	ISS logistics	30 August	Successful
13 February; 08:13	⚀ (Russia) Tanyusha-YuZGU 3, 4	South-West State University	Low Earth (ISS)	Technology demonstration	In orbit	Operational
13 February; 08:13	Tanyusha-YuZGU satellites were deployed on 15 August 2018 during a spacewalk.					
22 February; 14:17	(United States) Falcon 9 Full Thrust	F9-049	(United States) Vandenberg SLC-4E		(United States) SpaceX	
22 February; 14:17	(Spain) Paz	Hisdesat	Low Earth (SSO)	Earth observation	In orbit	Operational
22 February; 14:17	(United States) Tintin A	SpaceX	Low Earth	Technology demonstration	29 August 2020	Successful
22 February; 14:17	(United States) Tintin B	SpaceX	Low Earth	Technology demonstration	8 August 2020	Successful
22 February; 14:17	Flew with a re-used first-stage booster that was expended at sea. One half of the payload fairing splashed down in the ocean and was recovered, but it did not land on a ship as attempted. Last flight of Block 3 version rocket.					
27 February; 04:34:00	(Japan) H-IIA 202	F38	(Japan) Tanegashima LA-Y1		(Japan) MHI	
27 February; 04:34:00	(Japan) IGS-Optical 6	CSICE	Low Earth (SSO)	Reconnaissance	In orbit	Operational
← Jan; Feb; Mar; Apr; May; Jun; Jul; Aug; Sep; Oct; Nov; Dec →; === March ===
1 March; 22:02:00	(United States) Atlas V 541	AV-077	(United States) Cape Canaveral SLC-41		(United States) ULA	
1 March; 22:02:00	(United States) GOES-17 (GOES-S)	NESDIS	Geosynchronous	Meteorology	In orbit	Operational
6 March; 05:33	(United States) Falcon 9 Block 4	F9-050	(United States) Cape Canaveral SLC-40		(United States) SpaceX	
6 March; 05:33	(Spain) Hispasat 30W-6	Hispasat	Geosynchronous	Communications	In orbit	Operational
6 March; 05:33	⚀ (United States) PODSAT	NovaWurks/DARPA	Geosynchronous transfer orbit	Technology demonstration	In orbit	Operational
6 March; 05:33	First-stage booster was expended at sea and was not recovered.					
9 March; 17:10:06	(Russia) Soyuz ST-B / Fregat-MT	VS18	(France) Kourou ELS		(France) Arianespace	
9 March; 17:10:06	(Luxembourg) O3b × 4	SES S.A.	Medium Earth	Communications	In orbit	Operational
17 March; 07:10	(China) Long March 2D	2D-Y50	(China) Jiuquan SLS-2		(China) CASC	
17 March; 07:10	(China) LKW-4	CAS	Low Earth	Earth observation	In orbit	Operational
21 March; 17:44:23	(Russia) Soyuz-FG		(Kazakhstan) Baikonur Site 1/5		(Russia) Roscosmos	
21 March; 17:44:23	(Russia) Soyuz MS-08 / 54S	Roscosmos	Low Earth (ISS)	Expedition 55/56	4 October 2018; 11:45	Successful
21 March; 17:44:23	Crewed flight with three cosmonauts					
29 March; 11:26	(India) GSLV Mk II	F08	(India) Satish Dhawan SLP		(India) ISRO	
29 March; 11:26	(India) GSAT-6A	ISRO	Geosynchronous	Communications	In orbit	Spacecraft failure
29 March; 17:38:43	(Russia) Soyuz-2-1v		(Russia) Plesetsk Site 43/4		(Russia) Roscosmos	
29 March; 17:38:43	(Russia) EMKA (Kosmos 2525)	Ministry of Defence	Low Earth (SSO)	Reconnaissance	1 April 2021	Successful
29 March; 17:50	(China) Long March 3B / YZ-1	3B-Y48	(China) Xichang LC-2		(China) CASC	
29 March; 17:50	(China) BeiDou-3 M9	CNSA	Medium Earth	Navigation	In orbit	Operational
29 March; 17:50	(China) BeiDou-3 M10	CNSA	Medium Earth	Navigation	In orbit	Operational
30 March; 14:14	(United States) Falcon 9 Block 4	F9-051	(United States) Vandenberg SLC-4E		(United States) SpaceX	
30 March; 14:14	(United States) Iridium NEXT 41–50	Iridium	Low Earth	Communications	In orbit	Operational
30 March; 14:14	Re-used first-stage booster B1041. First stage was not recovered, did a simulated landing test at sea. Fairing recovery attempt failed due to parafoil issues.					
31 March; 03:22	(China) Long March 4C	4C-Y26	(China) Taiyuan LC-9		(China) CASC	
31 March; 03:22	(China) Gaofen-1 02	CNSA	SSO	Earth observation	In orbit	Operational
31 March; 03:22	(China) Gaofen-1 03	CNSA	SSO	Earth observation	In orbit	Operational
31 March; 03:22	(China) Gaofen-1 04	CNSA	SSO	Earth observation	In orbit	Operational
← Jan; Feb; Mar; Apr; May; Jun; Jul; Aug; Sep; Oct; Nov; Dec →; === April ===
2 April; 20:30	(United States) Falcon 9 Block 4	F9-052	(United States) Cape Canaveral SLC-40		(United States) SpaceX	
2 April; 20:30	(United States) SpaceX CRS-14	NASA	Low Earth (ISS)	ISS logistics	5 May 2018	Successful
2 April; 20:30	(United Kingdom) RemoveDEBRIS	University of Surrey	Low Earth	Technology demonstration	4 December 2021	Successful
2 April; 20:30	⚀ (United Kingdom) DebrisSat 1	University of Surrey	Low Earth	Technology demonstration	2 March 2019	Successful
2 April; 20:30	⚀ (United Kingdom) DebrisSat 2	University of Surrey	Low Earth	Technology demonstration	30 May 2020	Successful
2 April; 20:30	⚀ (Turkey) (Japan) Ubakusat	ITU/JPF/KIT	Low Earth	Technology demonstration	27 December 2020	Successful
2 April; 20:30	⚀ (Kenya) 1KUNS-PF	UoN	Low Earth	Technology demonstration	11 June 2020	Successful
2 April; 20:30	⚀ (Costa Rica) Proyecto Irazú	CAAE/ITCR	Low Earth	Technology demonstration	4 March 2020	Successful
2 April; 20:30	Re-used first-stage booster B1039, used to launch CRS-12 in 2017; and the Dragon capsule from CRS-8 in 2016. First stage was not recovered. Ubakusat, 1KUNS-PF, and Proyecto Irazú were deployed from the ISS on 11 May 2018. RemoveDEBRIS was deployed into orbit on 20 June 2018.					
5 April; 21:34	(France) Ariane 5 ECA	VA242	(France) Kourou ELA-3		(France) Arianespace	
5 April; 21:34	(Japan) Superbird-B3 / DSN-1	JSAT / DSN / JSDF	Geosynchronous	Communications	In orbit	Operational
5 April; 21:34	(United Kingdom) HYLAS-4	Avanti	Geosynchronous	Communications	In orbit	Operational
5 April; 21:34	First flight of Ariane 5 since off-target launch of VA241 in January 2018.					
10 April; 04:25	(China) Long March 4C	4C-Y25	(China) Jiuquan SLS-2		(China) CASC	
10 April; 04:25	(China) Yaogan 31 A	CAS	Low Earth	Reconnaissance	In orbit	Operational
10 April; 04:25	(China) Yaogan 31 B	CAS	Low Earth	Reconnaissance	In orbit	Operational
10 April; 04:25	(China) Yaogan 31 C	CAS	Low Earth	Reconnaissance	In orbit	Operational
10 April; 04:25	⚀ (China) Weina 1B	Shanghai Micro Satellite Engineering Center	Low Earth	Technology demonstration	In orbit	Operational
11 April; 22:34	(India) PSLV-XL	C41	(India) Satish Dhawan FLP		(India) ISRO	
11 April; 22:34	(India) IRNSS-1I	ISRO	Geosynchronous	Satellite navigation (IRNSS)	In orbit	Operational
14 April; 23:13	(United States) Atlas V 551	AV-079	(United States) Cape Canaveral SLC-41		(United States) ULA	
14 April; 23:13	(United States) AFSPC-11 / CBAS (USA-283)	U.S. Air Force	Geosynchronous	Communications (military)	In orbit	Operational
14 April; 23:13	(United States) EAGLE (USA-284 + USA-285/286/287)	Air Force Research Laboratory	Geosynchronous	Technology experiments (Space Test Program)	In orbit	Operational
18 April; 22:12	(Russia) Proton-M / Briz-M	?	(Kazakhstan) Baikonur		(Russia) RVSN RF	
18 April; 22:12	(Russia) Blagovest-12L / Kosmos 2526	VKS	Geosynchronous	Communications (military)	In orbit	Operational
18 April; 22:51	(United States) Falcon 9 Block 4	F9-053	(United States) Cape Canaveral SLC-40		(United States) SpaceX	
18 April; 22:51	(United States) TESS	NASA	HEO	Space observatory	In orbit	Operational
18 April; 22:51	Block 4 first-stage booster, serial number B1045.					
25 April; 17:57	(Russia) Rokot / Briz-KM		(Russia) Plesetsk Site 133/3		(France) / (Russia) Eurockot	
25 April; 17:57	Sentinel-3B	ESA	Low Earth (SSO)	Earth observation	In orbit	Operational
26 April; 04:42	(China) Long March 11	Y4	(China) Jiuquan LS-95A		(China) CASC	
26 April; 04:42	(China) Zhuhai-1 OHS 2A–2D	Zhuhai Orbita Control Engineering	Low Earth (SSO)	Earth observation	In orbit	Operational
26 April; 04:42	(China) Zhuhai-1 OVS 2A	Zhuhai Orbita Control Engineering	Low Earth (SSO)	Earth observation	In orbit	Operational
← Jan; Feb; Mar; Apr; May; Jun; Jul; Aug; Sep; Oct; Nov; Dec →; === May ===
3 May; 16:05	(China) Long March 3B/G2	3B-Y55	(China) Xichang LC-2		(China) CASC	
3 May; 16:05	(China) Apstar 6C	APT Satellite Holdings	Geosynchronous	Communications	In orbit	Operational
5 May; 11:05	(United States) Atlas V 401	AV-078	(United States) Vandenberg SLC-3E		(United States) ULA	
5 May; 11:05	(United States) InSight	NASA / JPL	TMI to Martian Surface	Mars lander	26 November; 19:52:59	Successful
5 May; 11:05	⚀ (United States) MarCO A (WALL-E)	NASA / JPL	Heliocentric	Communications	In orbit	Successful
5 May; 11:05	⚀ (United States) MarCO B (Eva)	NASA / JPL	Heliocentric	Communications	In orbit	Successful
5 May; 11:05	12th mission of the Discovery program. Mars lander mission dedicated to geological and seismological studies of the planet.					
8 May; 18:28	(China) Long March 4C	4C-Y20	(China) Taiyuan LC-9		(China) CASC	
8 May; 18:28	(China) Gaofen 5	CAST	Low Earth (SSO)	Earth observation	In orbit	Operational
11 May; 20:14	(United States) Falcon 9 Block 5	F9-054	(United States) Kennedy LC-39A		(United States) SpaceX	
11 May; 20:14	(Bangladesh) Bangabandhu-1	SPARRSO	Geosynchronous	Communications	In orbit	Operational
11 May; 20:14	First launch of a Falcon 9 Block 5 first-stage booster, serial number B1046. The booster was recovered.					
20 May; 21:28	(China) Long March 4C	4C-Y27	(China) Xichang LC-3		(China) CASC	
20 May; 21:28	(China) Queqiao	CNSA	Earth–Moon L_{2}, halo orbit	Communications	In orbit	Operational
20 May; 21:28	(China) Longjiang-1	CNSA	Selenocentric, elliptical orbit	Radio astronomy	In orbit	Spacecraft Failure
20 May; 21:28	(China) Longjiang-2	CNSA	Selenocentric, elliptical orbit	Radio astronomy	31 July 2019; 14:20	Successful
20 May; 21:28	The relay satellite Queqiao, or "Magpie Bridge" will stay in a halo orbit around the second Earth-Moon Lagrange point (E-M L_{2}) and support communications from the Chang'e 4 rover exploring the far side of the Moon.					
21 May; 08:44	(United States) Antares 230		(United States) MARS LP-0A		(United States) Orbital ATK	
21 May; 08:44	(United States) Cygnus CRS OA-9E; S.S. J.R. Thompson	NASA	Low Earth (ISS)	ISS logistics	30 July 2018; 09:17	Successful
21 May; 08:44	⚀ (United States) Aerocube 12A	The Aerospace Corporation	Low Earth (ISS)	Technology demonstration	26 May 2023	Successful
21 May; 08:44	⚀ (United States) Aerocube 12B	The Aerospace Corporation	Low Earth (ISS)	Technology demonstration	14 August 2023	Successful
21 May; 08:44	⚀ (United States) CubeRRT	OSU	Low Earth (ISS)	Technology demonstration	26 November 2020	Successful
21 May; 08:44	⚀ (Bulgaria) EnduroSat One	EnduroSat / Space Challenges Program	Low Earth (ISS)	Technology demonstration	15 October 2020	Successful
21 May; 08:44	⚀ (United States) EQUiSat	Brown University	Low Earth (ISS)	Technology demonstration	26 December 2020	Successful
21 May; 08:44	⚀ (United States) HaloSat	UI	Low Earth (ISS)	X-ray astronomy	4 January 2021	Successful
21 May; 08:44	⚀ (United States) Lemur-2 × 4	Spire Global	Low Earth	Earth observation	First: 13 January 2023; Last: 13 February 2023	Successful
21 May; 08:44	⚀ (United States) MemSat	Rowan University	Low Earth (ISS)	Technology demonstration	27 September 2020	Successful
21 May; 08:44	⚀ (United States) Radix	Analytical Space	Low Earth (ISS)	Technology demonstration	7 April 2020	Successful
21 May; 08:44	⚀ (United States) RadSat-g	MSU	Low Earth (ISS)	Technology demonstration	5 April 2021	Successful
21 May; 08:44	⚀ (United States) RainCube	JPL	Low Earth (ISS)	Technology demonstration	24 December 2020	Successful
21 May; 08:44	⚀ (United States) TEMPEST-D	CSU/JPL	Low Earth (ISS)	Technology demonstration	21 June 2021	Successful
21 May; 08:44	RainCube, Radix, CubeRRT, HaloSat, TEMPEST-D, EnduroSat One, EQUISat, MEMSat, RadSat-g are carried aboard Cygnus to be deployed from ISS later. CubeRRT, EQUISat, HaloSat, MemSat, RadSat-g, RainCube, TEMPEST-D, EnduroSat One, Radix were deployed on 13 July 2018. Four Lemur-2s and two Aerocubes were carried in the external deployer of Cygnus and deployed into orbit on 16 July 2018 after it departed from ISS.					
22 May; 19:47:58	(United States) Falcon 9 Block 4	F9-055	(United States) Vandenberg SLC-4E		(United States) SpaceX	
22 May; 19:47:58	(United States) Iridium NEXT 51–55	Iridium	Low Earth	Communications	In orbit	Operational
22 May; 19:47:58	(Germany) GRACE-FO 1, 2	DLR	Low Earth	Gravitational science	In orbit	Operational
22 May; 19:47:58	DLR arranged a rideshare of GRACE-FO on a Falcon 9 with Iridium following the cancellation of their Dnepr launch contract in 2015. Iridium CEO Matt Desch disclosed in September 2017 that GRACE-FO would be launched on the sixth Iridium NEXT mission. Re-used a first-stage booster.					
← Jan; Feb; Mar; Apr; May; Jun; Jul; Aug; Sep; Oct; Nov; Dec →; === June ===
2 June; 04:13	(China) Long March 2D	2D-Y20	(China) Jiuquan SLS-2		(China) CASC	
2 June; 04:13	(China) Gaofen 6	CAST	Low Earth (SSO)	Earth observation	In orbit	Operational
2 June; 04:13	⚀ (China) Luojia 1	Wuhan University	Low Earth (SSO)	Earth observation	In orbit	Operational
4 June; 04:45	(United States) Falcon 9 Block 4	F9-056	(United States) Cape Canaveral SLC-40		(United States) SpaceX	
4 June; 04:45	(Luxembourg) SES-12	SES S.A.	Geosynchronous	Communications	In orbit	Operational
5 June; 13:07	(China) Long March 3A	3A-Y25	(China) Xichang LC-2		(China) CAST	
5 June; 13:07	(China) Fengyun 2H	CMA	Geosynchronous	Meteorology	In orbit	Operational
6 June; 11:12:41	(Russia) Soyuz-FG		(Kazakhstan) Baikonur Site 1/5		(Russia) Roscosmos	
6 June; 11:12:41	(Russia) Soyuz MS-09 / 55S	Roscosmos	Low Earth (ISS)	Expedition 56/57	20 December 2018; 01:42	Successful
6 June; 11:12:41	(Russia) SiriusSat 1, 2	SPUTNIX	Low Earth (ISS)	Space research, Education	In orbit	Operational
6 June; 11:12:41	Crewed flight with three cosmonauts. SiriusSat satellites were deployed on 15 August 2018 during a spacewalk. Crew return was delayed due to the launch failure of Soyuz MS-10; it was rescheduled for 20 December, after the MS-11 crew arrives on 3 December.					
12 June; 04:20	(Japan) H-IIA 202	F39	(Japan) Tanegashima		MHI	
12 June; 04:20	(Japan) IGS Radar-6	CSICE	Low Earth (SSO)	Reconnaissance	In orbit	Operational
16 June; 21:30	(Russia) Soyuz-2.1b / Fregat-M		(Russia) Plesetsk Site 43/4		(Russia) RVSN RF	
16 June; 21:30	(Russia) GLONASS-M 756 / Kosmos 2527	VKS	Medium Earth	Navigation	In orbit	Operational
27 June; 03:30	(China) Long March 2C	2C-Yxx	(China) Xichang LC-3		(China) CASC	
27 June; 03:30	(China) XJSS A	CAST	Low Earth	Technology demonstration	In orbit	Operational
27 June; 03:30	(China) XJSS B	CAST	Low Earth	Technology demonstration	In orbit	Operational
29 June; 09:42	(United States) Falcon 9 Block 4	F9-057	(United States) Cape Canaveral SLC-40		(United States) SpaceX	
29 June; 09:42	(United States) SpaceX CRS-15	NASA	Low Earth (ISS)	ISS logistics	3 August 2018	Successful
29 June; 09:42	⚀ (Bhutan) BHUTAN-1	Kyushu Institute of Technology	Low Earth (ISS)	Technology demonstration	18 November 2020	Successful
29 June; 09:42	⚀ (Philippines) Maya-1	UP / DOST	Low Earth (ISS)	Technology demonstration	20 November 2020	Successful
29 June; 09:42	⚀ (Malaysia) UiTMSAT-1	UiTM	Low Earth (ISS)	Technology demonstration	20 November 2020	Successful
29 June; 09:42	Last orbital flight of a Block 4 booster version. Bhutan-1, Maya-1, UiTMSAT-1 were deployed into orbit from ISS on 10 August 2018.					
← Jan; Feb; Mar; Apr; May; Jun; Jul; Aug; Sep; Oct; Nov; Dec →

== Suborbital flights ==
Date and time (UTC)	Rocket	Flight number	Launch site		LSP	
Date and time (UTC)	Payload (⚀ = CubeSat)	Operator	Orbit	Function	Decay (UTC)	Outcome
Date and time (UTC)	Remarks					
18 January; 05:53	(India) Agni V		(India) Integrated Test Range Launch Complex IV		(India) DRDO	
18 January; 05:53		DRDO	Suborbital	Missile test	18 January	Successful
18 January; 05:53	Apogee: ~800 kilometres (500 mi)					
19 January; 12:17	(Canada) Black Brant IX		(United States) Poker Flat Research Range		(United States) NASA	
19 January; 12:17	(United States) DXL-3	U of M	Suborbital	Astronomy	19 January	Successful
19 January; 12:17	Apogee: 230 kilometres (140 mi)					
26 January; 14:11:15	(United States) Terrier–Improved Orion		(United States) Poker Flat Research Range		(United States) NASA	
26 January; 14:11:15	(United States) Super Soaker	ASTRA	Suborbital	Atmospheric	26 January	Successful
26 January; 14:11:15	Apogee: ~160 kilometres (99 mi)					
26 January; 14:48:00	(United States) Terrier–Improved Orion		(United States) Poker Flat Research Range		(United States) NASA	
26 January; 14:48:00	(United States) Super Soaker	ASTRA	Suborbital	Atmospheric	26 January	Successful
26 January; 14:48:00	Apogee: ~97 kilometres (60 mi)					
26 January; 14:49:30	(United States) Terrier–Improved Orion		(United States) Poker Flat Research Range		(United States) NASA	
26 January; 14:49:30	(United States) Super Soaker	ASTRA	Suborbital	Atmospheric	26 January	Successful
26 January; 14:49:30	Apogee: ~160 kilometres (99 mi)					
31 January	(United States) IRBM ?		(United States) C-17, Pacific Ocean		(United States) MDA	
31 January	(United States) FTM-29 Target	MDA	Suborbital	ABM target	31 January	Successful
31 January	Apogee: 300 kilometres (190 mi)					
31 January	(United States) SM-3 Block IIA		(United States) Pacific Missile Range Facility		(United States) US Navy	
31 January	(United States) FTM-29 Interceptor	MDA	Suborbital	ABM test	31 January	Failure
31 January	Test of a land-based Aegis Ballistic Missile Defense (BMD) weapon system, failed to intercept the target					
5 February	(China) B-611?		(China) Shuangchengzi		(China) PLA	
5 February		PLA	Suborbital	ABM target	5 February	Successful
5 February	Target					
5 February	(China) SC-19		(China) Korla		(China) PLA	
5 February		PLA	Suborbital	ABM test	5 February	Successful
5 February	Interceptor, successful intercept					
6 February; 03:00	(India) Agni I		(India) Integrated Test Range		(India) IDRDL	
6 February; 03:00		IDRDL	Suborbital	Missile test	6 February	Successful
6 February; 03:00	Apogee: ~500 kilometres (310 mi)?					
17 February; 07:00	(Brazil) / (United States) VS-31/Improved Malemute		(Sweden) Esrange		(Germany) DLR / (Sweden) SSC	
17 February; 07:00	(Germany) MAPHEUS-7	DLR	Suborbital	Technology demonstration	17 February	Successful
17 February; 07:00	Apogee: 248 kilometres (154 mi)					
18 February; 23:30	(Israel) Arrow III		(Israel) Negev		(Israel) IAF	
18 February; 23:30		IAI/IDF	Suborbital	Flight test	18 February	Successful
18 February; 23:30	Successful flight test of the Arrow-III weapon system					
20 February; 03:08	(India) Agni II		(India) Integrated Test Range		(India) Indian Army / DRDO	
20 February; 03:08		Indian Army/DRDO	Suborbital	Missile test	20 February	Successful
25 March; 10:51	(United States) Terrier–Improved Malemute		(United States) Wallops Flight Facility		(United States) NASA	
25 March; 10:51	(United States) USIP	NASA	Suborbital	Student payloads	25 March	Successful
25 March; 10:51	Apogee: 172 kilometres (107 mi)					
27 March; 02:40?	(United States) UGM-133 Trident II		(United States) USS Nebraska (SSBN-739), Pacific Missile Range Facility		(United States) US Navy	
27 March; 02:40?		US Navy	Suborbital	Missile test	27 March	Successful
27 March; 02:40?	Demonstration and Shakedown Operation (DASO) 28					
27 March; 02:40?	(United States) UGM-133 Trident II		(United States) USS Nebraska (SSBN-739), Pacific Missile Range Facility		(United States) US Navy	
27 March; 02:40?		US Navy	Suborbital	Missile test	27 March	Successful
27 March; 02:40?	Demonstration and Shakedown Operation (DASO) 28					
31 March; 16:19	(Canada) Black Brant IX		(United States) Wallops Flight Facility		(United States) NASA	
31 March; 16:19	(United States) ASPIRE-2	NASA	Suborbital	Technology demonstration	31 March	Successful
31 March; 16:19	Tested Mars 2020's parachute					
4 April; 10:40	(Canada) Black Brant IX		(Marshall Islands) Kwajalein Atoll		(United States) NASA	
4 April; 10:40	(United States) WRX-R	PSU	Suborbital	XR Astronomy	4 April	Successful
4 April; 10:40	Apogee: 205 kilometres (127 mi)					
4 April; 18:00	(China) Hyperbola-1S (Shian Quxian 1S)		(China) Hainan Island		(China) i-Space	
4 April; 18:00	Mass simulator	i-Space	Suborbital	Test flight	4 April	Successful
4 April; 18:00	Apogee: 108 kilometres (67 mi)					
6 April; 14:00	(India) RH-300 Mk-II		(India) TERLS		(India) ISRO	
6 April; 14:00	(India)	ISRO VSSC	Suborbital	Ionosphere research	6 April	Successful
6 April; 14:00	Apogee: 107 kilometres (66 mi)					
16 April; 16:47	(Canada) Black Brant IX		(Marshall Islands) Kwajalein Atoll		(United States) NASA	
16 April; 16:47	(United States) CHESS-4	University of Colorado	Suborbital	UV Astronomy	16 April	Successful
16 April; 16:47	Apogee: 200 kilometres (120 mi)					
25 April; 12:26	(United States) Minuteman-III		(United States) Vandenberg Air Force Base LF-10		(United States) US Air Force	
25 April; 12:26		US Air Force	Suborbital	Test flight	25 April	Successful
29 April; 17:06	(United States) New Shepard		(United States) Corn Ranch		(United States) Blue Origin	
29 April; 17:06	(United States) Suborbital Flight Experiment Monitor-2	NASA	Suborbital	Technology demonstration	29 April	Successful
29 April; 17:06	(United States) Schmitt Space Communicator	Solstar	Suborbital	Technology demonstration	29 April	Successful
29 April; 17:06	(Germany) Daphnia	University of Bayreuth	Suborbital	Microgravity Research	29 April	Successful
29 April; 17:06	(Germany) EQUIPAGE	Otto von Guericke University	Suborbital	Microgravity Research	29 April	Successful
29 April; 17:06	(Germany) EUPHORIE	University of Duisburg-Essen	Suborbital	Microgravity Research	29 April	Successful
29 April; 17:06	8th flight, Apogee: ~107 kilometres (66 mi)					
13 May; 08:30	(Brazil) VSB-30		(Sweden) Esrange		(Europe) EuroLaunch	
13 May; 08:30	(Germany) / TEXUS-54	DLR / ESA	Suborbital	Microgravity	13 May	Successful
13 May; 08:30	Apogee: 261 kilometres (162 mi)					
14 May; 08:23	(United States) Minuteman-III		(United States) Vandenberg Air Force Base LF-04		(United States) US Air Force	
14 May; 08:23		US Air Force	Suborbital	Test flight	14 May	Successful
17 May; 00:33	(China) OS-X, Chongqing Liangjiang (Twin-River) Star		Undisclosed location in northwest China		(China) OneSpace	
17 May; 00:33		OneSpace	Suborbital	Test flight	17 May	Successful
22 May	(Russia) RSM-56 Bulava		(Russia) K-535 Yury Dolgorukiy, White Sea		(Russia) VMF	
22 May		VMF	Suborbital	Missile test	22 May	Successful
22 May	(Russia) RSM-56 Bulava		(Russia) K-535 Yury Dolgorukiy, White Sea		(Russia) VMF	
22 May		VMF	Suborbital	Missile test	22 May	Successful
22 May	(Russia) RSM-56 Bulava		(Russia) K-535 Yury Dolgorukiy, White Sea		(Russia) VMF	
22 May		VMF	Suborbital	Missile test	22 May	Successful
22 May	(Russia) RSM-56 Bulava		(Russia) K-535 Yury Dolgorukiy, White Sea		(Russia) VMF	
22 May		VMF	Suborbital	Missile test	22 May	Successful
23 May	(United States) Terrier Malemute		(United States) Pacific Missile Range Facility		(United States) NNSA	
23 May	(United States) HOT SHOT 1	NNSA	Suborbital	Technology experiments	23 May	Successful
23 May	Apogee: ~360 kilometres (220 mi)					
29 May; 18:54	(Canada) Black Brant IX		(United States) White Sands		(United States) NASA	
29 May; 18:54	(United States) Hi-C 2.1	NASA/MSFC	Suborbital	Solar research	29 May	Successful
29 May; 18:54	Apogee: 290 kilometres (180 mi)					
31 May; 04:00	(Brazil) VSB-30		(Sweden) Esrange		(Europe) EuroLaunch	
31 May; 04:00	(Germany) / TEXUS-55	DLR / ESA	Suborbital	Microgravity	31 May	Successful
31 May; 04:00	Apogee: 255 kilometres (158 mi)					
3 June; 04:18	(India) Agni V		(India) Integrated Test Range Launch Complex IV		(India) DRDO	
3 June; 04:18		DRDO	Suborbital	Missile test	3 June	Successful
3 June; 04:18	Apogee: ~800 kilometres (500 mi)					
7 June	(United States) Boosted Zombi (ATACMS)		(United States) White Sands		(United States) NASA	
7 June		US Army	Suborbital	Missile test	7 June	Successful
7 June	Apogee: 100 kilometres (62 mi)?					
18 June; 19:00	(Canada) Black Brant IX		(United States) White Sands		(United States) NASA	
18 June; 19:00	(United States) EVE	CU Boulder	Suborbital	SDO calibration	18 June	Successful
18 June; 19:00	Apogee: 250 kilometres (160 mi)					
19 June	(Russia) RS-24 Yars		(Russia) Plesetsk		(Russia) RVSN	
19 June		RVSN	Suborbital	Missile test	19 June	Successful
21 June; 09:30	(United States) Terrier–Improved Orion		(United States) Wallops Flight Facility		(United States) NASA	
21 June; 09:30	(United States) RockOn	University of Colorado	Suborbital	Student payloads	21 June	Successful
21 June; 09:30	Apogee: 120 kilometres (75 mi)					
29 June	(Japan) Momo 2		(Japan) Taiki Aerospace Research Field		(Japan) Interstellar Technologies	
29 June	(Japan)	Kochi University of Technology	Suborbital	Technology demonstration	29 June	Launch failure
29 June	Two seconds after launch, the engine failed and the vehicle fell back to the pad and exploded					
