= List of spaceflight launches in July–December 2018 =

This article lists orbital and suborbital launches during the second half of the year 2018. For all other spaceflight activities, see 2018 in spaceflight. For launches in the first half of 2018, see List of spaceflight launches in January–June 2018. For launches in 2019, see List of spaceflight launches in January–June 2019.

== Orbital launches ==
- ← Jan
- Feb
- Mar
- Apr
- May
- Jun
- Jul
- Aug
- Sep
- Oct
- Nov
- Dec →

Date and time (UTC)	Rocket	Flight number	Launch site		LSP	
Date and time (UTC)	Payload (⚀ = CubeSat)	Operator	Orbit	Function	Decay (UTC)	Outcome
Date and time (UTC)	Remarks					
← Jan; Feb; Mar; Apr; May; Jun; Jul; Aug; Sep; Oct; Nov; Dec →; === July ===
9 July; 03:56	(China) Long March 2C / SMA	2CSMA-Y3	(China) Jiuquan LC-43/94		(China) CASC	
9 July; 03:56	(Pakistan) PRSS-1	SUPARCO	Low Earth (SSO)	Earth observation	In orbit	Operational
9 July; 03:56	(Pakistan) PakTES-1A	SUPARCO	Low Earth (SSO)	Earth observation	In orbit	Operational
9 July; 20:58	(China) Long March 3A	3A-Y27	(China) Xichang LA-2		(China) CASC	
9 July; 20:58	(China) BeiDou IGSO-7	CNSA	IGSO	Navigation	In orbit	Operational
9 July; 20:58	Last flight of Long March 3A launch vehicle.					
9 July; 21:51:34	(Russia) Soyuz-2.1a		(Kazakhstan) Baikonur		(Russia) Roscosmos	
9 July; 21:51:34	(Russia) Progress MS-09 / 70P	Roscosmos	Low Earth (ISS)	ISS logistics	25 January 2019	Successful
9 July; 21:51:34	Fastest rendezvous with the ISS, with a new two-orbit procedure taking less than four hours.					
22 July; 05:50	(United States) Falcon 9 Block 5	F9-058	(United States) Cape Canaveral SLC-40		(United States) SpaceX	
22 July; 05:50	(Canada) Telstar 19V	Telesat	Geosynchronous	Communications	In orbit	Operational
25 July; 11:25:01	(France) Ariane 5 ES	VA244	(France) Kourou ELA-3		(France) Arianespace	
25 July; 11:25:01	Galileo FOC 19, 20, 21, 22	ESA	Medium Earth	Navigation	In orbit	Operational
25 July; 11:25:01	Third Galileo launch with Ariane 5 (10th overall), carrying Tara, Samuel, Anna, and Ellen. Last flight of Ariane 5 ES variant; further Galileo launches will be carried by Ariane 6.					
25 July; 11:39:26	(United States) Falcon 9 Block 5	F9-059	(United States) Vandenberg SLC-4E		(United States) SpaceX	
25 July; 11:39:26	(United States) Iridium NEXT 56-65	Iridium	Low Earth	Communications	In orbit	Operational
29 July; 01:48	(China) Long March 3B / YZ-1	3B-Y49	(China) Xichang		(China) CASC	
29 July; 01:48	(China) BeiDou-3 M5	CNSA	Medium Earth	Navigation	In orbit	Operational
29 July; 01:48	(China) BeiDou-3 M6	CNSA	Medium Earth	Navigation	In orbit	Operational
31 July; 03:00	(China) Long March 4B	4B-Y37	(China) Taiyuan LC-9		(China) CASC	
31 July; 03:00	(China) Gaofen 11	CAST	Low Earth (SSO)	Earth observation	In orbit	Operational
← Jan; Feb; Mar; Apr; May; Jun; Jul; Aug; Sep; Oct; Nov; Dec →; === August ===
7 August; 05:18	(United States) Falcon 9 Block 5	F9-060	(United States) Cape Canaveral SLC-40		(United States) SpaceX	
7 August; 05:18	(Indonesia) Telkom 4 / Merah Putih	Telkom Indonesia	Geosynchronous	Communications	In orbit	Operational
12 August; 07:31	(United States) Delta IV Heavy	D-380	(United States) Cape Canaveral SLC-37B		(United States) ULA	
12 August; 07:31	(United States) Parker Solar Probe	NASA	Heliocentric	Heliophysics	In orbit	Operational
12 August; 07:31	Heliophysics observation mission planned to make in situ studies of the Sun's outer corona at a perihelion distance of 8.5 solar radii (5.9 million kilometers) – the closest any spacecraft will come to the Sun to date.					
22 August; 21:20:09	(Italy) Vega	VV12	(France) Kourou ELV		(France) Arianespace	
22 August; 21:20:09	ADM-Aeolus	ESA	Low Earth (SSO)	Earth observation	27 July 2023	Successful
24 August; 23:52	(China) Long March 3B / YZ-1	3B-Y50	(China) Xichang		(China) CASC	
24 August; 23:52	(China) BeiDou-3 M11	CNSA	Medium Earth	Navigation	In orbit	Operational
24 August; 23:52	(China) BeiDou-3 M12	CNSA	Medium Earth	Navigation	In orbit	Operational
← Jan; Feb; Mar; Apr; May; Jun; Jul; Aug; Sep; Oct; Nov; Dec →; === September ===
7 September; 03:15	(China) Long March 2C	2C-Y48	(China) Taiyuan LC-9		(China) CAST	
7 September; 03:15	(China) HaiYang 1C	CAST	Low Earth	Earth observation	In orbit	Operational
10 September; 04:45	(United States) Falcon 9 Block 5	F9-061	(United States) Cape Canaveral SLC-40		(United States) SpaceX	
10 September; 04:45	(Canada) Telstar 18V	Telesat	Geosynchronous	Communications	In orbit	Operational
15 September; 13:02	(United States) Delta II 7420	D-381	(United States) Vandenberg SLC-2W		(United States) ULA	
15 September; 13:02	(United States) ICESat-2	NASA	Low Earth	Earth observation	In orbit	Operational
15 September; 13:02	⚀ (United States) ELFIN × 2 (ELFIN, ELFIN-STAR)	UCLA	Low Earth	Magnetospheric research	ELFIN A: 17 September 2022; ELFIN B: 30 September 2022	Successful
15 September; 13:02	⚀ (United States) DAVE (CP-7)	Cal Poly	Low Earth	Technology demonstration	12 February 2023	Successful
15 September; 13:02	⚀ (United States) SurfSat	UCF	Low Earth	Technology demonstration	27 January 2023	Successful
15 September; 13:02	Last flight of the Delta II series; final flight of the Thor rocket family.					
16 September; 16:37	(India) PSLV-CA	C42	(India) Satish Dhawan FLP		(India) ISRO	
16 September; 16:37	(United Kingdom) SSTL S1-4	SSTL	Low Earth	Earth observation	In orbit	Operational
16 September; 16:37	(United Kingdom) NovaSAR-S	SSTL / British Government	Low Earth	Earth observation	In orbit	Operational
19 September; 14:07	(China) Long March 3B / YZ-1	3B-Y51	(China) Xichang LC-3		(China) CASC	
19 September; 14:07	(China) BeiDou-3 M13	CNSA	Medium Earth	Navigation	In orbit	Operational
19 September; 14:07	(China) BeiDou-3 M14	CNSA	Medium Earth	Navigation	In orbit	Operational
22 September; 17:52:27	(Japan) H-IIB	F7	(Japan) Tanegashima LA-Y2		(Japan) MHI	
22 September; 17:52:27	(Japan) HTV-7	JAXA	Low Earth (ISS)	ISS logistics	10 November 2018	Successful
22 September; 17:52:27	⚀ (Japan) (Singapore) SPATIUM-I	Kyushu Institute of Technology / Nanyang Technological University	Low Earth	Technology demonstration	23 September 2021	Successful
22 September; 17:52:27	⚀ (Japan) RSP-00	Ryman Sat Project	Low Earth	Technology demonstration	14 March 2021	Spacecraft failure
22 September; 17:52:27	⚀ (Japan) STARS-Me (Tenryū)	Shizuoka University	Low Earth	Technology demonstration	26 June 2021	Successful
22 September; 17:52:27	SPATIUM-1, RSP-00, and STARS-Me were carried by HTV-7 to be deployed into orbit from the International Space Station. They were deployed on 6 October 2018.					
25 September; 22:38	(France) Ariane 5 ECA	VA243	(France) Kourou ELA-3		(France) Arianespace	
25 September; 22:38	(Azerbaijan) Azerspace-2 / (United States) Intelsat 38	Azercosmos / Intelsat	Geosynchronous	Communications	In orbit	Operational
25 September; 22:38	(United States) / (Japan) Horizons-3e	Intelsat / JSAT	Geosynchronous	Communications	In orbit	Operational
25 September; 22:38	Hundredth Ariane 5 mission. Flight VA243 was delayed from 25 May due to issues with GSAT-11.					
29 September; 04:13	(China) Kuaizhou 1A	F2	(China) Jiuquan LS-95A		(China) CASIC	
29 September; 04:13	(China) Centispace-1-S1	Beijing Future Navigation Technology	Low Earth (SSO)	Navigation	In orbit	Operational
← Jan; Feb; Mar; Apr; May; Jun; Jul; Aug; Sep; Oct; Nov; Dec →; === October ===
8 October; 02:21	(United States) Falcon 9 Block 5	F9-062	(United States) Vandenberg SLC-4E		(United States) SpaceX	
8 October; 02:21	(Argentina) SAOCOM 1A	CONAE	Low Earth (SSO)	Earth observation	In orbit	Operational
8 October; 02:21	First RTLS at Vandenberg					
9 October; 02:43	(China) Long March 2C / YZ-1S	2C-Y38	(China) Jiuquan SLS-2		(China) CASC	
9 October; 02:43	(China) Yaogan 32 A	CAS	Low Earth	Reconnaissance	In orbit	Operational
9 October; 02:43	(China) Yaogan 32 B	CAS	Low Earth	Reconnaissance	In orbit	Operational
9 October; 02:43	First flight of the Yuanzheng-1S upper stage variant					
11 October; 08:40	(Russia) Soyuz-FG		(Kazakhstan) Baikonur Site 1/5		(Russia) Roscosmos	
11 October; 08:40	(Russia) Soyuz MS-10 / 56S	Roscosmos	Low Earth (ISS)	Expedition 57/58	11 October 2018	Launch failure
11 October; 08:40	Crewed flight with two cosmonauts. Launch failure, astronauts landed safely in Soyuz capsule.					
15 October; 04:23	(China) Long March 3B / YZ-1	3B-Y52	(China) Xichang		(China) CASC	
15 October; 04:23	(China) BeiDou-3 M15	CNSA	Medium Earth	Navigation	In orbit	Operational
15 October; 04:23	(China) BeiDou-3 M16	CNSA	Medium Earth	Navigation	In orbit	Operational
17 October; 04:15	(United States) Atlas V 551	AV-073	(United States) Cape Canaveral SLC-41		(United States) ULA	
17 October; 04:15	(United States) AEHF-4 (USA-288)	U.S. Air Force	Geosynchronous	Communications (military)	In orbit	Operational
20 October; 01:45	(France) Ariane 5 ECA	VA245	(France) Kourou ELA-3		(France) Arianespace	
20 October; 01:45	(Japan) BepiColombo	ESA / JAXA	Mercurian orbit	Mercury probes	In orbit	En route
20 October; 01:45	Third and final cornerstone mission of the Horizon 2000+ programme. Joint ESA / JAXA Mercury mission consisting of two orbiters, the ESA Mercury Planetary Orbiter and the JAXA Mio (Mercury Magnetospheric Orbiter)					
24 October; 22:57	(China) Long March 4B	4B-Y34	(China) Taiyuan LC-9		(China) CAST	
24 October; 22:57	(China) HaiYang 2B	CAST	Low Earth	Earth observation	In orbit	Operational
25 October; 00:15	(Russia) Soyuz-2.1b		(Russia) Plesetsk Site 43/4		(Russia) RVSN RF	
25 October; 00:15	(Russia) Lotos-S1 №3 / Kosmos 2528	VKS	Low Earth	ELINT	In orbit	Operational
27 October; 08:00	(China) Zhuque-1		(China) Jiuquan (mobile launcher)		(China) LandSpace	
27 October; 08:00	⚀ (China) Weilai 1 / Future 1 (CCTV)	China Central Television	Low Earth (SSO)	Space science / remote sensing	27 October 2018	Launch failure
27 October; 08:00	Maiden flight of the Zhuque-1 solid-propellant rocket					
29 October; 00:43	(China) Long March 2C	2C-Y22	(China) Jiuquan SLS-2		(China) CASC	
29 October; 00:43	(China) / (France) CFOSAT	CNSA / CNES	Low Earth (SSO)	Earth observation	In orbit	Operational
29 October; 00:43	⚀ (China) Xiaoxiang-1 (2)	LaserFleet	Low Earth (SSO)	Technology demonstration (laser communications)	In orbit	Operational
29 October; 00:43	⚀ (China) Zhaojin-1 (Tongchuan-1)	Tsinghua University	Low Earth (SSO)	Gamma ray detector (gravitational wave research)	In orbit	Operational
29 October; 00:43	⚀ (China) Tianfuguoxing-1 (Xinghe)	Guoxing Yuhang (ADA Space)	Low Earth (SSO)	Technology demonstration (remote sensing)	In orbit	Operational
29 October; 00:43	⚀ (China) Changshagaoxin	Changsha City	Low Earth (SSO)	Amateur radio	In orbit	Operational
29 October; 00:43	⚀ (Belarus) CubeBel-1 (BSUSat-1)	Belarusian State University	Low Earth (SSO)	Technology demonstration	In orbit	Operational
29 October; 04:08	(Japan) H-IIA 202	F40	(Japan) Tanegashima LA-Y1		(Japan) MHI	
29 October; 04:08	(Japan) GOSAT-2 (Ibuki 2)	JAXA	Low Earth (SSO)	Earth observation	In orbit	Operational
29 October; 04:08	(United Arab Emirates) KhalifaSat	EIAST	Low Earth (SSO)	Earth observation	In orbit	Operational
29 October; 04:08	⚀ (Japan) AUTcube2	Aichi University of Technology	Low Earth	Technology demonstration	In orbit	Operational
29 October; 04:08	(Philippines) / (Japan) Diwata-2b	DOST / TU	Low Earth	Earth observation	In orbit	Operational
29 October; 04:08	⚀ (Japan) Stars-AO	Shizuoka University	Low Earth	Technology demonstration	In orbit	Operational
29 October; 04:08	(Japan) Ten-Koh	Kyushu Institute of Technology	Low Earth	Magnetosphere observation / Technology demonstration	In orbit	Operational
← Jan; Feb; Mar; Apr; May; Jun; Jul; Aug; Sep; Oct; Nov; Dec →; === November ===
1 November; 15:57	(China) Long March 3B/E	3B-Y41	(China) Xichang		(China) CASC	
1 November; 15:57	(China) BeiDou-3 G1Q	CNSA	Geosynchronous	Navigation	In orbit	Operational
3 November; 20:17	(Russia) Soyuz-2.1b / Fregat-M		(Russia) Plesetsk Site 43/4		(Russia) RVSN RF	
3 November; 20:17	(Russia) GLONASS-M 757 / Kosmos 2529	VKS	Medium Earth	Navigation	In orbit	Operational
7 November; 00:47:27	(Russia) Soyuz ST-B / Fregat-M	VS19	(France) Kourou ELS		(France) Arianespace	
7 November; 00:47:27	MetOp-C	Eumetsat	Low Earth (SSO)	Meteorology	In orbit	Operational
11 November; 03:50	(United States) Electron	"It's Business Time"	(New Zealand) Mahia LC-1A		(United States) Rocket Lab	
11 November; 03:50	⚀ (United States) Cicero 10	GeoOptics	Low Earth	Earth observation	In orbit	Operational
11 November; 03:50	⚀ (United States) IRVINE01	Irvine CubeSat STEM Program	Low Earth	Education	3 February 2023	Successful
11 November; 03:50	⚀ (United States) Lemur-2-82	Spire Global	Low Earth	Earth observation	5 October 2023	Successful
11 November; 03:50	⚀ (United States) Lemur-2-83	Spire Global	Low Earth	Earth observation	6 September 2023	Successful
11 November; 03:50	⚀ (Germany) NABEO	HPS GmbH	Low Earth	Technology demonstration	10 November 2023	Successful
11 November; 03:50	⚀ (Australia) Proxima 1	Fleet Space Technologies	Low Earth	Technology demonstration	In orbit	Operational
11 November; 03:50	⚀ (Australia) Proxima 2	Fleet Space Technologies	Low Earth	Technology demonstration	In orbit	Operational
14 November; 11:38	(India) GSLV Mk III	D2	(India) Satish Dhawan SLP		(India) ISRO	
14 November; 11:38	(India) GSAT-29	ISRO	Geosynchronous	Communications	In orbit	Operational
14 November; 11:38	Second orbital flight of GSLV Mk III					
15 November; 20:46	(United States) Falcon 9 Block 5	F9-063	(United States) Kennedy LC-39A		(United States) SpaceX	
15 November; 20:46	(Qatar) Es'hail 2	Es'hailSat	Geosynchronous	Communications	In orbit	Operational
16 November; 18:14:08	(Russia) Soyuz-FG		(Kazakhstan) Baikonur		(Russia) Roscosmos	
16 November; 18:14:08	(Russia) Progress MS-10 / 71P	Roscosmos	Low Earth (ISS)	ISS logistics	4 June 2019	Successful
16 November; 18:14:08	Return to flight of the Soyuz-FG variant involved in the Soyuz MS-10 launch failure.					
17 November; 09:01:22	(United States) Antares 230		(United States) MARS LP-0A		(United States) Northrop Grumman	
17 November; 09:01:22	(United States) Cygnus NG-10; SS John Young	NASA	Low Earth (ISS)	ISS logistics	25 February 2019	Successful
17 November; 09:01:22	⚀ (United States) CHEFSat-2	NRL	Low Earth	Technology demonstration	14 July 2022	Successful
17 November; 09:01:22	⚀ (United States) KickSat-2	Cornell University	Low Earth	Technology demonstration	2 April 2019	Successful
17 November; 09:01:22	⚀ (United Arab Emirates) MySat-1	Masdar Institute of Science and Technology	Low Earth	Technology demonstration	16 December 2022	Successful
17 November; 09:01:22	⚀ (United States) SEOPS-Quantum Radar-1 (CONFIRM?)	SEOPS, LLC	Low Earth	Education	September 2023	Successful
17 November; 09:01:22	⚀ (United States) SEOPS-Quantum Radar-2 (CONFIRM?)	SEOPS, LLC	Low Earth	Education	September 2023	Successful
17 November; 09:01:22	Largest number of satellites launched on a single rocket (108). Cygnus NG-10, CHEFSat 2, Kicksat 2, 104 Sprite Chipsats (deployed from Kicksat 2), MYSAT 1. CubeSats were carried aboard Cygnus and deployed into orbit after the departure of Cygnus from ISS. KickSat-2 carried 105 Sprite "ChipSats" which were successfully deployed into a rapidly decaying orbit on 17 March 2019.					
18 November; 18:00	(China) Long March 3B / YZ-1	3B-Yxx	(China) Xichang		(China) CASC	
18 November; 18:00	(China) BeiDou-3 M17	CNSA	Medium Earth	Navigation	In orbit	Operational
18 November; 18:00	(China) BeiDou-3 M18	CNSA	Medium Earth	Navigation	In orbit	Operational
19 November; 23:40	(China) Long March 2D	2D-Y28	(China) Jiuquan SLS-2 (LC34)		(China) CASC	
19 November; 23:40	(China) Jiading-1 (OKW-1)	Shanghai OK Space	Low Earth (SSO)	Communications	In orbit	Operational
19 November; 23:40	(China) Shiyan 6-01	CAST	Low Earth	Technology demonstration	In orbit	Operational
19 November; 23:40	(China) Tianping-1A	CAST	Low Earth	Technology demonstration	In orbit	Operational
19 November; 23:40	(China) Tianping-1B	CAST	Low Earth	Technology demonstration	In orbit	Operational
19 November; 23:40	(China) Tianzhi-1	Chinese Academy of Sciences	Low Earth	Technology demonstration	In orbit	Operational
21 November; 01:42:31	(Italy) Vega	VV13	(France) Kourou ELV		(France) Arianespace	
21 November; 01:42:31	(Morocco) Mohammed VI-B	Morocco	Low Earth	Earth observation	In orbit	Operational
29 November; 04:27:30	(India) PSLV-CA	C43	(India) Satish Dhawan FLP		(India) ISRO	
29 November; 04:27:30	(India) HySIS	ISRO	Low Earth	Earth observation	In orbit	Operational
29 November; 04:27:30	(United States) BlackSky Global 1	Spaceflight Industries	Low Earth	Earth observation	In orbit	Operational
29 November; 04:27:30	⚀ (Spain) ^{3}Cat-1	Universitat Politècnica de Catalunya (UPC)	Low Earth	Technology demonstration	In orbit	Operational
29 November; 04:27:30	⚀ (Canada) CASE (Kepler-1)	Kepler Communications	Low Earth	Technology demonstration	23 February 2023	Successful
29 November; 04:27:30	⚀ (Australia) Centauri 1	Fleet Space Technologies	Low Earth	Technology demonstration	In orbit	Operational
29 November; 04:27:30	⚀ (United States) CICERO-8	GeoOptics Inc.	Low Earth	Meteorology	23 May 2023	Successful
29 November; 04:27:30	⚀ (Colombia) FACSAT-1	Colombian Air Force	Low Earth	Earth observation	3 June 2023	Successful
29 November; 04:27:30	⚀ (United States) (Flock 3r) × 16	Planet Labs	Low Earth	Earth observation	In orbit	Operational
29 November; 04:27:30	⚀ (Netherlands) Hiber-1	Hiber Global	Low Earth	Technology demonstration	24 February 2023	Spacecraft failure
29 November; 04:27:30	⚀ (United States) HSAT 1	Harris Corporation	Low Earth	Technology demonstration	1 November 2022	Successful
29 November; 04:27:30	⚀ (Malaysia) InnoSat 2	Astronautic Technology Sdn Bhd	Low Earth	Technology demonstration	9 December 2022	Successful
29 November; 04:27:30	⚀ (United States) Lemur-2 × 4	Spire Global Satellite	Low Earth	Earth observation	First: 13 January 2023; Last: 20 February 2023	Successful
29 November; 04:27:30	⚀ (Finland) Reaktor Hello World	Reaktor Radio Actives Ry	Low Earth	Technology demonstration	22 October 2023	Successful
30 November; 02:27	(Russia) Rokot / Briz-KM		(Russia) Plesetsk Site 133/3		(Russia) RVSN RF	
30 November; 02:27	(Russia) Strela-3M 16–18 / Kosmos 2530–2532	VKS	Low Earth	Communications (military)	In orbit	Operational
← Jan; Feb; Mar; Apr; May; Jun; Jul; Aug; Sep; Oct; Nov; Dec →; === December ===
3 December; 11:31	(Russia) Soyuz-FG		(Kazakhstan) Baikonur Site 1/5		(Russia) Roscosmos	
3 December; 11:31	(Russia) Soyuz MS-11 / 57S	Roscosmos	Low Earth (ISS)	Expedition 58/59	25 June 2019; 02:47	Successful
3 December; 11:31	Crewed flight with three cosmonauts					
3 December; 18:34	(United States) Falcon 9 Block 5	F9-064	(United States) Vandenberg SLC-4E		(United States) SpaceX	
3 December; 18:34	(United States) SSO-A / SHERPA; 65 small satellites	Spaceflight Industries	Low Earth (SSO)	Satellite dispenser	In orbit	Successful
3 December; 18:34	(United States) BlackSky Global 2	Spaceflight Industries	Low Earth (SSO)	Earth observation		
3 December; 18:34	(United States) Capella 1 (Denali)	Capella Space	Low Earth (SSO)	Earth observation (radar)	25 January 2023	Successful
3 December; 18:34	(Europe) ESEO	ALMASpace	Low Earth (SSO)	Education	In orbit	Successful
3 December; 18:34	(Germany) Eu:CROPIS	DLR	Low Earth (SSO)	Life sciences	In orbit	Partial failure
3 December; 18:34	(United States) eXCITe + SeeMe constellation	DARPA	Low Earth (SSO)	Technology demonstration (satlets)		
3 December; 18:34	(United States) FalconSat 6	U.S. Air Force Academy	Low Earth (SSO)	Technology demonstration		
3 December; 18:34	(Finland) ICEYE X2	ICEYE	Low Earth (SSO)	Earth observation (radar)		
3 December; 18:34	(United States) SkySat 14, 15	Planet Labs	Low Earth (SSO)	Earth observation		
3 December; 18:34	(United States) STPSat 5	USAF STP	Low Earth (SSO)	Technology demonstration		
3 December; 18:34	⚀ (Spain) Aistechsat 2	Aistech	Low Earth (SSO)	Earth observation		
3 December; 18:34	⚀ (Switzerland) Astrocast 0.1	Astrocast	Low Earth (SSO)	Technology demonstration		
3 December; 18:34	⚀ (United States) Audacy Zero	Audacy	Low Earth (SSO)	Technology demonstration		
3 December; 18:34	⚀ (United States) BlackHawk	ViaSat	Low Earth (SSO)	Technology demonstration		
3 December; 18:34	⚀ (United States) BRIO	SpaceQuest, Ltd., Myriota	Low Earth (SSO)	Technology demonstration	15 July 2025	Successful
3 December; 18:34	⚀ (Australia) Centauri 2	Fleet Space Technologies	Low Earth (SSO)	Technology demonstration	20 March 2023	Successful
3 December; 18:34	⚀ (United States) CSIM-FD	University of Colorado Boulder	Low Earth (SSO)	Heliophysics	9 August 2025	Successful
3 December; 18:34	⚀ (Italy) Eaglet 1	OHB Italia	Low Earth (SSO)	Earth observation		
3 December; 18:34	⚀ (United States) Enoch	LACMA	Low Earth (SSO)	Space art	21 December 2021	Successful
3 December; 18:34	⚀ (United States) Elysium Star 2	Elysium Space	Low Earth (SSO)	Space burial	Lower: 6 December 2024	Operational (1 of 2)
3 December; 18:34	⚀ (India) ExseedSat 1	Exseed	Low Earth (SSO)	Amateur radio		
3 December; 18:34	⚀ (United States) Flock-3s 1–3	Planet Labs	Low Earth (SSO)	Earth observation	First: 19 June 2025; Last: 13 December 2025	Successful
3 December; 18:34	⚀ (United States) Fox 1C	AMSAT, VPI, Vanderbilt University	Low Earth (SSO)	Technology demonstration		
3 December; 18:34	⚀ (United States) Hawk 1–3	HawkEye 360	Low Earth (SSO)	SIGINT, traffic monitoring		
3 December; 18:34	⚀ (Netherlands) Hiber-2	Hiber Global	Low Earth (SSO)	Communications	29 January 2026	Spacecraft failure
3 December; 18:34	⚀ (United States) ICE-Cap	US Navy PEO Space Systems	Low Earth (SSO)	Technology demonstration		
3 December; 18:34	⚀ (Brazil) ITASAT-1	ITA	Low Earth (SSO)	Earth observation		
3 December; 18:34	⚀ (United States) IRVINE02	Irvine CubeSat STEM Program	Low Earth (SSO)	Education	16 February 2026	Successful
3 December; 18:34	⚀ (Jordan) JY1-Sat	Jordanian universities	Low Earth (SSO)	Amateur radio		
3 December; 18:34	⚀ (South Korea) K2SAT	KAIST	Low Earth (SSO)	Technology demonstration		
3 December; 18:34	⚀ (Kazakhstan) KazSTSAT	Kazakhstan Garysh Sapary, Astrium	Low Earth (SSO)	Earth observation		
3 December; 18:34	⚀ (Kazakhstan) KazSciSat	Institute of space technique and technology	Low Earth (SSO)	Earth observation		
3 December; 18:34	⚀ (Kazakhstan) Al-Farabi 2	KazGU	Low Earth (SSO)	Earth observation	7 May 2026	Successful
3 December; 18:34	⚀ (Thailand) KNACKSAT	KMUTNB	Low Earth (SSO)	Technology demonstration		
3 December; 18:34	⚀ (United States) Landmapper-BC 4	Astro Digital	Low Earth (SSO)	Earth observation		
3 December; 18:34	⚀ (United States) MinXSS 2	University of Colorado Boulder	Low Earth (SSO)	Heliophysics		
3 December; 18:34	⚀ (Germany) MOVE II	TUM	Low Earth (SSO)	Technology demonstration	18 July 2025	Successful
3 December; 18:34	⚀ (South Korea) NEXTSat 1	KAIST	Low Earth (SSO)	Technology demonstration		
3 December; 18:34	⚀ (United States) Orbital Reflector	Nevada Museum of Art	Low Earth (SSO)	Art		
3 December; 18:34	⚀ (United States) OrbWeaver 1, 2	Tethers Unlimited, Inc., DARPA	Low Earth (SSO)	Technology demonstration	OW 1: 9 September 2024; OW 2: 6 October 2024	Successful
3 December; 18:34	⚀ (United States) ORS 7A, 7B (Polar Scout 1, 2)	USCG, DHS	Low Earth (SSO)	Communications		
3 December; 18:34	⚀ (Poland) PW-Sat 2	Warsaw University of Technology	Low Earth (SSO)	Technology demonstration	23 February 2021	Successful
3 December; 18:34	⚀ (Australia) RAAF M1	Australian Defence Force Academy	Low Earth (SSO)	Technology demonstration		
3 December; 18:34	⚀ (United States) RANGE A, B	Georgia Institute of Technology	Low Earth (SSO)	Technology demonstration		
3 December; 18:34	⚀ (United States) ROSE 1	Phase Four	Low Earth (SSO)	Technology demonstration		
3 December; 18:34	⚀ (United States) SeaHawk 1	University of North Carolina	Low Earth (SSO)	Earth observation		
3 December; 18:34	⚀ (Canada) Sirion Pathfinder 2	Sirion Global	Low Earth (SSO)	Technology demonstration		
3 December; 18:34	⚀ (South Korea) SNUGLITE	Seoul National University	Low Earth (SSO)	Amateur radio, Technology demonstration		
3 December; 18:34	⚀ (South Korea) SNUSAT 2	Seoul National University	Low Earth (SSO)	Earth observation		
3 December; 18:34	⚀ (United States) SpaceBEE 5–7	Swarm Technologies	Low Earth (SSO)	Communications	First: 27 February 2024; Last: 8 March 2026	Successful
3 December; 18:34	⚀ (United States) SPAWAR-CAL O, R, OR	United States Navy	Low Earth (SSO)	Calibration		
3 December; 18:34	⚀ (Finland) Suomi-100	Aalto University	Low Earth (SSO)	Technology demonstration		
3 December; 18:34	⚀ (United States) THEA	SpaceQuest, Ltd., Aurora Insight	Low Earth (SSO)	Technology demonstration		
3 December; 18:34	⚀ (Canada) VESTA	exactEarth	Low Earth (SSO)	Technology demonstration	8 January 2026	Successful
3 December; 18:34	⚀ (South Korea) VisionCube	Korea Aerospace University	Low Earth (SSO)	Thermospheric research		
3 December; 18:34	⚀ (United States) WeissSat 1	The Weiss School	Low Earth (SSO)	Technology demonstration		
3 December; 18:34	The SSO-A "dedicated rideshare" mission delivered 64 small payloads with custom-made dispensers.					
4 December; 20:37	(France) Ariane 5 ECA	VA246	(France) Kourou ELA-3		(France) Arianespace	
4 December; 20:37	(India) GSAT-11	ISRO	Geosynchronous	Communications	In orbit	Operational
4 December; 20:37	(South Korea) GEO-KOMPSAT-2A	KARI	Geosynchronous	Meteorology	In orbit	Operational
5 December; 18:16	(United States) Falcon 9 Block 5	F9-065	(United States) Cape Canaveral SLC-40		(United States) SpaceX	
5 December; 18:16	(United States) SpaceX CRS-16	NASA	Low Earth (ISS)	ISS logistics	14 January 2019	Successful
5 December; 18:16	(Denmark) Delphini 1	AU	Low Earth	Technology demonstration	14 March 2021	Successful
5 December; 18:16	(United States) TechEdSat 8	SJSU, UIdaho, NASA	Low Earth	Technology demonstration	20 April 2020	Successful
5 December; 18:16	(United States) CAT 1, 2	APL	Low Earth	Technology demonstration	13 April 2021	Successful
5 December; 18:16	(United States) UNITE	USI	Low Earth	Ionospheric science	21 October 2021	Successful
5 December; 18:16	First stage tumbled during descent, and did not make it to Landing Zone 1. It achieved a water landing in the Atlantic Ocean. CubeSat payloads were carried in the CRS-16, and deployed into orbit from the ISS on 31 January 2019.					
7 December; 04:12	(China) Long March 2D	2D-Y38	(China) Jiuquan SLS-2 (LC-34/pad 94)		(China) CASC	
7 December; 04:12	(Saudi Arabia) SaudiSat 5A	KACST	Low Earth (SSO)	Earth observation	In orbit	Operational
7 December; 04:12	(Saudi Arabia) SaudiSat 5B	KACST	Low Earth (SSO)	Earth observation	In orbit	Operational
7 December; 04:12	(China) TY/DF-1	CAST	Low Earth (SSO)	Technology demonstration	In orbit	Operational
7 December; 04:12	(China) TFSTAR (Douyu-666)	CAST	Low Earth (SSO)	Communications	In orbit	Operational
7 December; 04:12	(China) Xinjiang Jiaotong 01 (TY3-01)	CAST	Low Earth (SSO)	Communications	In orbit	Operational
7 December; 04:12	(China) Piao Chong (Ladybeetle) 1-7	CAST	Low Earth (SSO)	Communications, IoT	In orbit	Operational
7 December; 18:24	(China) Long March 3B/E	3B-Y30	(China) Xichang LC-2		(China) CASC	
7 December; 18:24	(China) Chang'e 4	CNSA	Selenocentric	Lunar lander	In orbit	Operational
7 December; 18:24	China's second lunar lander (back-up to Chang'e 3), and the first spacecraft to attempt a soft landing on the far side of the Moon.					
16 December; 06:33	(United States) Electron	"This One's For Pickering"	(New Zealand) Mahia LC-1A		(United States) Rocket Lab	
16 December; 06:33	⚀ (United States) ALBus	NASA Glenn Research Center	Low Earth	Technology demonstration	Unidentified	Successful
16 December; 06:33	⚀ (United States) CeREs	NASA Goddard Space Flight Center	Low Earth	Earth observation	14 December 2022	Successful
16 December; 06:33	⚀ (United States) CHOMPTT	NASA, UFL, Stanford University, KACST	Low Earth	Technology demonstration	13 May 2024	Successful
16 December; 06:33	⚀ (United States) CubeSail 1	University of Illinois at Urbana–Champaign	Low Earth	Technology demonstration	2 July 2024	Successful
16 December; 06:33	⚀ (United States) DaVinci	North Idaho STEM Charter Academy	Low Earth	Technology demonstration	9 February 2023	Successful
16 December; 06:33	⚀ (United States) ISX	Cal Poly	Low Earth	Technology demonstration	18 May 2024	Successful
16 December; 06:33	⚀ (United States) NMTSat	New Mexico Institute of Mining and Technology	Low Earth	Technology demonstration	1 November 2023	Successful
16 December; 06:33	⚀ (United States) RSat-P	U.S. Naval Academy	Low Earth	Technology demonstration	Unidentified	Successful
16 December; 06:33	⚀ (United States) SHFT-2 (Goergen)	NASA Jet Propulsion Laboratory	Low Earth	Technology demonstration	29 November 2022	Successful
16 December; 06:33	⚀ (United States) Shields-1	NASA Langley Research Center	Highly elliptical	Technology demonstration	12 February 2026	Successful
16 December; 06:33	⚀ (United States) STF-1	NASA's Katherine Johnson IV&V Facility, WVU, WVSGC	Low Earth	Technology demonstration	21 February 2024	Successful
16 December; 06:33	⚀ (United States) TOMSat Eagle Scout	The Aerospace Corporation	Low Earth	Technology demonstration	10 February 2024	Successful
16 December; 06:33	⚀ (United States) TOMSat R³ (AeroCube 11)	The Aerospace Corporation	Low Earth	Earth observation	3 January 2024	Successful
16 December; 06:33	Launch for NASA's Venture Class Launch Services program (VCLS-1), including ELaNa payloads.					
19 December; 10:40	(India) GSLV Mk II	F11	(India) Satish Dhawan SLP		(India) ISRO	
19 December; 10:40	(India) GSAT-7A	Indian Air Force	Geosynchronous	Communications (military)	In orbit	Operational
19 December; 16:37:14	(Russia) Soyuz ST-A / Fregat-M	VS20	(France) Kourou ELS		(France) Arianespace	
19 December; 16:37:14	(France) CSO 1	French Armed Forces	Low Earth (SSO)	Reconnaissance	In orbit	Operational
21 December; 00:20	(Russia) Proton-M / Briz-M		(Kazakhstan) Baikonur		(Russia) RVSN RF	
21 December; 00:20	(Russia) Blagovest-13L (Kosmos 2533)	VKS	Geosynchronous	Communications (military)	In orbit	Operational
21 December; 23:51	(China) Long March 11	Y5	(China) Jiuquan LS-95A		(China) CASC	
21 December; 23:51	(China) Hongyun 1	CASIC	Low Earth (SSO)	Communications (test)	In orbit	Operational
21 December; 23:51	First test flight for the planned Hongyun constellation of 156 broadband communications satellites.					
23 December; 13:51	(United States) Falcon 9 Block 5	F9-066	(United States) Cape Canaveral SLC-40		(United States) SpaceX	
23 December; 13:51	(United States) GPS IIIA-01 (USA-289) Vespucci	U.S. Air Force	Medium Earth	Navigation	In orbit	Operational
23 December; 13:51	Named after Italian explorer Amerigo Vespucci.					
24 December; 16:53	(China) Long March 3C/E	3C-Y17	(China) Xichang LC-2		(China) CASC	
24 December; 16:53	(China) TJSW-3	CNSA	Geosynchronous	Communications test (probably ELINT)	In orbit	Operational
27 December; 02:07	(Russia) Soyuz-2.1a / Fregat-M		(Russia) Vostochny Site 1S		(Russia) Roscosmos	
27 December; 02:07	(Russia) Kanopus-V №5	Roscosmos	Low Earth (SSO)	Earth observation	In orbit	Operational
27 December; 02:07	(Russia) Kanopus-V №6	Roscosmos	Low Earth (SSO)	Earth observation	In orbit	Operational
27 December; 02:07	(Japan) GRUS-1	Axelspace	Low Earth (SSO)	Earth observation	In orbit	Operational
27 December; 02:07	⚀ (South Africa) ZACube-2	Cape Peninsula University of Technology	Low Earth	Technology demonstration	24 April 2024	Successful
27 December; 02:07	⚀ (Spain) Lume-1	University of Vigo	Low Earth	Communications	14 February 2024	Successful
27 December; 02:07	⚀ (United States) Lemur-2 × 8	Spire Global	Low Earth	Maritime tracking / Atmospheric	First: 11 January 2025; Last: 13 May 2025	Successful
27 December; 02:07	⚀ (Germany) D-Star ONE iSat	iSky Technology	Low Earth	Aircraft tracking	In orbit	Operational
27 December; 02:07	⚀ (Germany) D-Star ONE Sparrow	German Orbital Systems	Low Earth	Technology demonstration / Amateur radio	In orbit	Operational
27 December; 02:07	⚀ (Germany) UWE-4	University of Würzburg	Low Earth	Technology demonstration	In orbit	Operational
27 December; 02:07	⚀ (United States) Flock-3k × 12	Planet Labs	Low Earth	Earth observation	First: 29 December 2022; Last: 28 February 2023	Successful
27 December; 02:07	Three Israeli payloads, SAMSON-1,2,3, were planned but they missed the deadline and were replaced with mass simulator payloads.					
29 December; 08:00	(China) Long March 2D / YZ-3	2D-Y35	(China) Jiuquan SLS-2		(China) CASC	
29 December; 08:00	(China) Hongyan 1	CAST	Low Earth	Communications	In orbit	Operational
29 December; 08:00	(China) Yunhai-2 01-06	CAST	Low Earth	Meteorology	In orbit	Operational
29 December; 08:00	First test flight for the planned Hongyan constellation of 320 M2M communications satellites.					

== Suborbital flights ==
Date and time (UTC)	Rocket	Flight number	Launch site		LSP	
Date and time (UTC)	Payload (⚀ = CubeSat)	Operator	Orbit	Function	Decay (UTC)	Outcome
Date and time (UTC)	Remarks					
18 July; 15:11	(United States) New Shepard		(United States) Corn Ranch		(United States) Blue Origin	
18 July; 15:11	(United States) Crew Capsule 2.0	Blue Origin	Suborbital	Test flight	18 July	Successful
18 July; 15:11	9th flight, the Crew Capsule 2.0-1 RSS H.G.Wells carrying a mannequin and various experiments from NASA, Johns Hopkins University Applied Physics Laboratory, Purdue University, Otto von Guericke University and Olympiaspace in Germany. Both booster and capsule are flight proven. Successful test of the in-flight abort system at high altitude, Apogee: ~119 kilometres (74 mi), duration 11 minutes.					
20 July; 22:00	(United States) Astra (Rocket 1)		(United States) Pacific Spaceport Complex – Alaska		(United States) Astra Space	
20 July; 22:00		Astra Space	Suborbital	Flight test	20 July	Launch failure
23 July; 06:00	(Canada) Black Brant IX		(United States) White Sands		(United States) NASA	
23 July; 06:00	(United States) Micro-X	NU	Suborbital	XR Astronomy	23 July	Successful
23 July; 06:00	The detector worked as anticipated during the flight but the pointing system was unable to lock onto the target Cassiopeia A, apogee: 270 kilometres (170 mi)					
31 July; 11:38	(United States) Minuteman-III		(United States) Vandenberg Air Force Base		(United States) US Air Force	
31 July; 11:38		US Air Force	Suborbital	Test flight	31 July	Launch failure
14 August; 10:13	(United States) Terrier–Improved Malemute		(United States) Wallops Flight Facility		(United States) NASA	
14 August; 10:13	(United States) RockSat-X	NASA	Suborbital	Student experiments	14 August	Successful
14 August; 10:13	Apogee: 146 kilometres (91 mi)					
25 August; 18:15?	(United States) SARGE		(United States) Spaceport America, New Mexico		(United States) Exos Aerospace	
25 August; 18:15?	SARGE Pathfinder	Exos Aerospace	Suborbital	Test flight	25 August	Partial launch failure
25 August; 18:15?	⚀ (India) SKISAT	SKI	Suborbital	Technology demonstration	25 August	Partial launch failure
25 August; 18:15?	A GPS receiver on the rocket stopped providing data during the rocket's ascent. That triggered an automatic shutdown of the rocket's engine 38 seconds after liftoff, versus a planned duration of 62 to 65 seconds. The rocket reached a peak altitude of 28 kilometers, rather than the planned 80 kilometers					
5 September; 05:00	(China) Hyperbola-1Z (Shian Quxian 1Z)		(China) Jiuquan		(China) i-Space	
5 September; 05:00	⚀ (China) Three CubeSats	Two companies	Suborbital	Flight test	5 September	Successful
5 September; 05:00	Apogee: 108 kilometres (67 mi)					
7 September; 13:30	(Canada) Black Brant IX		(United States) Wallops Flight Facility		(United States) NASA	
7 September; 13:30	(United States) ASPIRE-3	NASA	Suborbital	Technology demonstration	7 September	Successful
7 September; 13:30	Tested Mars 2020's parachute					
7 September; 17:21	(Canada) Black Brant IX		(United States) White Sands		(United States) NASA	
7 September; 17:21	(United States) FOXSI	UMN	Suborbital	Solar research	7 September	Successful
7 September; 17:21	Apogee: 304 kilometres (189 mi)					
12 September; 08:37	(United States) MRBM	JFTM-5 E2	(United States) Pacific Missile Range Facility		(United States) MDA	
12 September; 08:37		JMSDF/MDA	Suborbital	ABM target	12 September	Successful
12 September; 08:37	Apogee: 150 km (93 mi)?, intercepted by SM-3-IB					
12 September; 08:40	(United States) RIM-161 Standard Missile 3-IB	JFTM-5 E2	(Japan) JS Atago, Pacific Ocean		(Japan) JMSDF	
12 September; 08:40		JMSDF	Suborbital	ABM test	12 September	Successful
12 September; 08:40	Apogee: 150 km (93 mi)?, intercepted target					
12 September; 14:33	(United States) SpaceLoft XL		(United States) Spaceport America		(United States) UP Aerospace	
12 September; 14:33	(United States) FOP-5 (ADEPT, SFEM-3, AFTS)	NASA	Suborbital	Three technology experiments	12 September	Successful
12 September; 14:33	Mission SL-12, Apogee: 114 kilometres (71 mi)					
17 September; 14:09	(United States) SpaceLoft XL		(United States) Spaceport America		(United States) UP Aerospace	
17 September; 14:09	(United States) FOP-6, Celestis 15	NASA	Suborbital	Technology experiments	17 September	Successful
17 September; 14:09	Mission SL-11, Apogee: 114 kilometres (71 mi)					
27 September; 12:15	(Norway) Nucleus		(Norway) Andøya		(Norway) Andøya	
27 September; 12:15	(Norway) Nammo Nucleus	Nammo	Suborbital	Technology experiments	27 September	Successful
27 September; 12:15	Apogee: 107 kilometres (66 mi)					
29 September	(United States) Traveler III		(United States) Black Rock Desert		(United States) USC Rocket Propulsion Lab	
29 September	Flight test		Suborbital	Flight test	29 September	Partial
29 September	No data received after a miscomunication resulted in the avionics and recovery system being unarmed. Vehicle otherwise operated as intended and is approximated to have reached space.					
8 October	(Pakistan) Ghauri		(Pakistan) Tilla		Army of Pakistan	
8 October	(Pakistan) Haft-5	Army of Pakistan	Suborbital	Missile test	8 October	Successful
8 October	Apogee: 400 kilometres (250 mi) ?					
11 October; 11:00?	(China) DF-11?		(China) Jiuquan		(China) PLARF	
11 October; 11:00?		PLARF	Suborbital	Missile test	11 October	Successful
11 October; 11:00?	Apogee: 500 kilometres (310 mi) ?					
11 October	(Russia) R-29RMU Sineva		(Russia) Russian submarine, Barents Sea		(Russia) VMF	
11 October		VMF	Suborbital	Missile test	11 October	Successful
11 October	(Russia) R-29RMU Sineva		(Russia) Russian submarine, Barents Sea		(Russia) VMF	
11 October		VMF	Suborbital	Missile test	11 October	Successful
11 October	(Russia) R-29R Volna		(Russia) Russian submarine, Sea of Okhotsk		(Russia) VMF	
11 October		VMF	Suborbital	Missile test	11 October	Successful
11 October	(Russia) R-29R Volna		(Russia) Russian submarine, Sea of Okhotsk		(Russia) VMF	
11 October		VMF	Suborbital	Missile test	11 October	Successful
26 October	(United States) MRBM		(United States) Pacific Missile Range Facility		(United States) MDA	
26 October	(United States) FTM-45 Target	MDA	Suborbital	ABM target	26 October	Successful
26 October	Ballistic missile target for interception					
26 October	(United States) SM-3 Block IIA		(United States) USS John Finn, Kauai		(United States) US Navy	
26 October	(United States) FTM-45 Interceptor	MDA	Suborbital	ABM test	26 October	Successful
26 October	Ballistic missile interceptor, successful intercept					
7 November; 07:01	(United States) Minuteman-III		(United States) Vandenberg Air Force Base		(United States) US Air Force	
7 November; 07:01		US Air Force	Suborbital	Test flight	7 November	Successful
28 November; 07:00	(South Korea) KSLV-2 Pilot Vehicle		(South Korea) Naro Space Center		(South Korea) KARI	
28 November; 07:00	Boilerplate	KARI	Suborbital	Test flight	28 November	Successful
28 November; 07:00	Apogee: 209 kilometres (130 mi)					
29 November	(United States) Astra (Test Flight 2)		(United States) Pacific Spaceport Complex – Alaska		(United States) Astra Space	
29 November		Astra Space	Suborbital	Flight test	29 November	Launch failure
30 November	(Iran) Khorramshahr		(Iran) Semnan		(Iran) AFIRI	
30 November		AFIRI	Suborbital	Missile test	30 November	Successful
7 December; 11:06	(Canada) Black Brant X		(Norway) Ny-Ålesund		(United States) NASA	
7 December; 11:06	(United States) VISIONS-2 1	GSFC	Suborbital	Ionosphere research	7 December	Successful
7 December; 11:06	Apogee: 805 kilometres (500 mi)					
7 December; 11:08	(Canada) Black Brant X		(Norway) Ny-Ålesund		(United States) NASA	
7 December; 11:08	(United States) VISIONS-2 2	GSFC	Suborbital	Ionosphere research	7 December	Successful
7 December; 11:08	Apogee: 600 kilometres (370 mi)					
8 December; 08:26	(Canada) Black Brant XIIA		(Norway) Andøya		(United States) NASA	
8 December; 08:26	(United States) TRICE-2-High	UoI	Suborbital	Electrodynamics	8 December	Successful
8 December; 08:26	Apogee: 1,042 kilometres (647 mi)					
8 December; 08:28	(Canada) Black Brant XIIA		(Norway) Andøya		(United States) NASA	
8 December; 08:28	(United States) TRICE-2-Low	UoI	Suborbital	Electrodynamics	8 December	Successful
8 December; 08:28	Apogee: 756 kilometres (470 mi)					
9 December; 15:43	(Brazil) VS-30		(Brazil) Alcântara		(Brazil) AEB	
9 December; 15:43	(Brazil) PSR-01	INPE	Suborbital	Test	9 December	Successful
9 December; 15:43	Apogee: 120 kilometres (75 mi)?					
10 December	(United States) IRBM-T1		(United States) C-17, Pacific Ocean		(United States) MDA	
10 December	(United States) FTI-03 Target	MDA	Suborbital	ABM target	10 December	Successful
10 December	Apogee: 300 kilometres (190 mi)					
10 December	(United States) SM-3 Block IIA		(United States) Pacific Missile Range Facility		(United States) US Navy	
10 December	(United States) FTI-03 Interceptor	MDA	Suborbital	ABM test	10 December	Successful
10 December	Ballistic missile interceptor, successful intercept					
10 December; 08:00	(India) Agni V		(India) Integrated Test Range Launch Complex IV		(India) DRDO	
10 December; 08:00		DRDO	Suborbital	Missile test	10 December	Successful
10 December; 08:00	Apogee: ~800 kilometres (500 mi)					
10 December	(Russia) RS-12M Topol		(Russia) Kapustin Yar		(Russia) RVSN	
10 December		RVSN	Suborbital	Missile test	10 December	Launch failure
13 December; 16:00	(United States) SpaceShipTwo	VP-03	(United States) White Knight Two, from Mojave Spaceport		(United States) Virgin Galactic	
13 December; 16:00	(United States) VSS Unity	Virgin Galactic	Suborbital	Test flight	13 December	Successful
13 December; 16:00	First crewed sub-orbital high altitude flight of SpaceShipTwo with two astronauts (Mark P. Stucky and Frederick W. Sturckow), Apogee: 82.7 kilometres (51.4 mi). Not considered a spaceflight under FAI rules, but recognized as a spaceflight under U.S. law.					
18 December; 07:46	(Canada) Black Brant IX		(United States) White Sands Missile Range		(United States) NASA	
18 December; 07:46	(United States) DEUCE 2	University of Colorado	Suborbital	Astronomy	18 December	Successful
18 December; 07:46	Apogee: 282 kilometres (175 mi)					
26 December; 09:59	(Russia) UR-100NU		(Russia) Yasniy		(Russia) RVSN	
26 December; 09:59	Avangard	RVSN	Suborbital	Missile test	26 December	Successful
26 December; 09:59	Yu-71 Hypersonic Vehicle Test, Apogee: 1,000 kilometres (620 mi)?					
