= Satellite bus =

Main body and structural component of the satellite

Communications satellite bus and payload module

A satellite bus (or spacecraft bus) is the main body and structural component of a satellite or spacecraft, in which the payload and all scientific instruments are held.

Bus-derived satellites are less customized than specially-produced satellites, but have specific equipment added to meet customer requirements, for example with specialized sensors or transponders, in order to achieve a specific mission.

They are commonly used for geosynchronous satellites, particularly communications satellites, but are most commonly used in spacecraft which occupy low Earth orbit missions.

== Examples ==
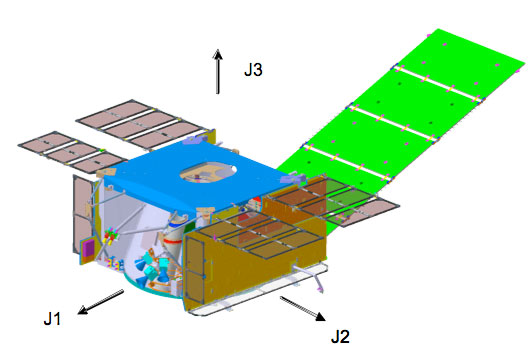
Diagram of the James Webb Space Telescope's spacecraft bus. The solar panel is in green and the light purple flats are radiator shades.

Some satellite bus examples include:

- Boeing DS&S 702
- Lockheed Martin Space Systems A2100
- Moog Inc. SL-OMV, Meteor, Meteorite
- Alphabus – Family of geostationary communications satellites
- INVAP ARSAT-3K
- Airbus D&S Eurostar
- ISRO's I-1K, I-2K, I-3K, I-4K, I-6K, and Indian Mini Satellite bus
- NASA Ames MCSB
- SSL 1300
- Rocket Lab Photon – Satellite bus made by Rocket Lab family
- Orbital ATK Star Bus family, inc GEOStar
- Mitsubishi Electric DS2000
- Spacecraft bus of the James Webb Space Telescope
- SPUTNIX TabletSat
- SPUTNIX OrbiCraft-Pro

== Components ==
A bus typically consists of the following subsystems:

- Command and data handling (C&DH) system
- Communications system and antennas
- Electrical power system (EPS)
- Propulsion
- Thermal control
- Attitude control system (ACS)
- Guidance, navigation, and control (GNC) system
- Structures and trusses
- Life support (for crewed missions).

== See also ==
- Comparison of satellite buses
- Service module
- Satellite
