= RemoveDEBRIS =

Project to demonstrate various space debris removal technologies

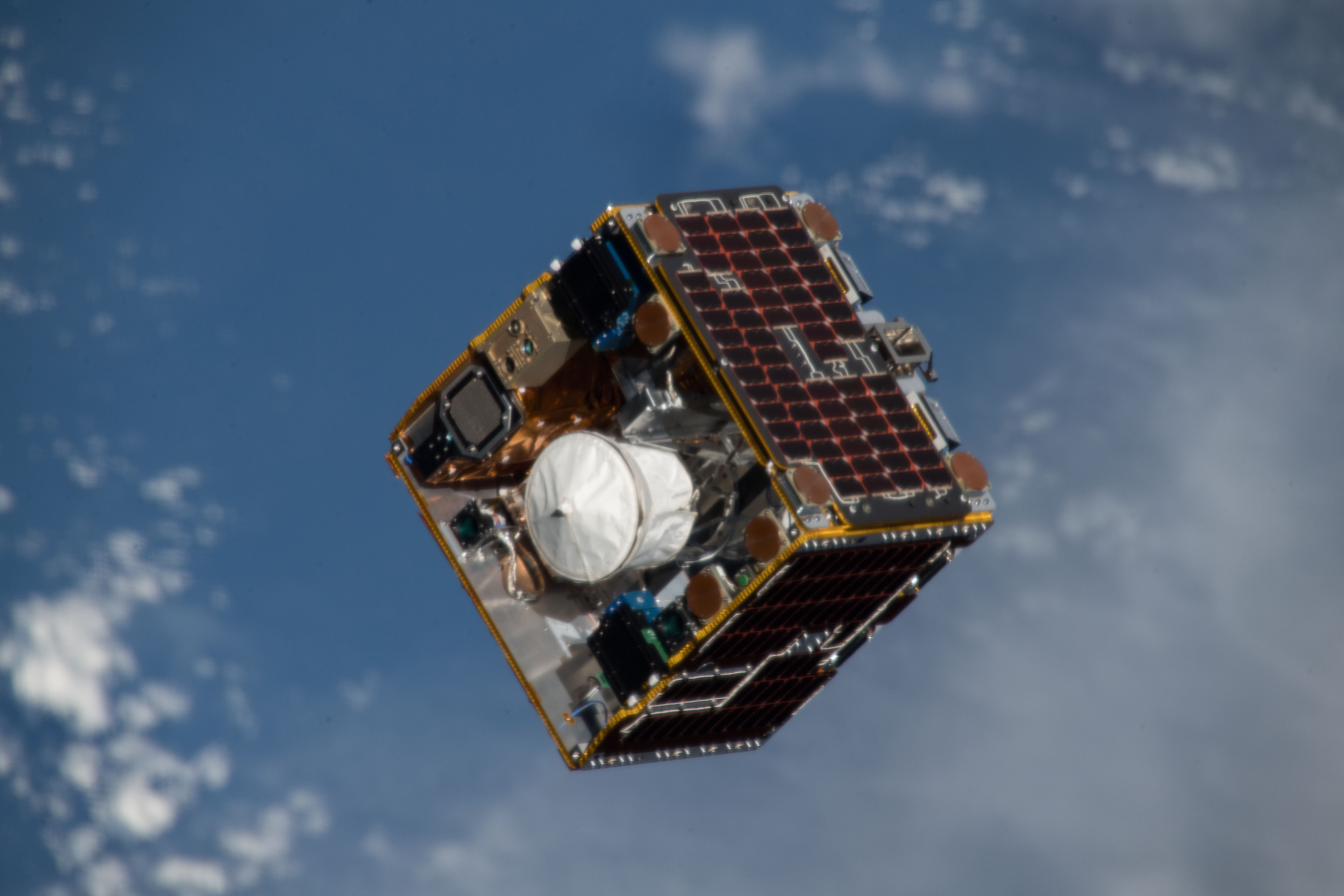
- Mission type: Debris removal tech demo
- Operator: Surrey Satellite Technology
- COSPAR ID: 1998-067NT
- SATCAT no.: 43510
- Website: RemoveDEBRIS mission at Surrey Space Centre
- Mission duration: Launch to re-entry: 1.5 years (planned); 3 years, 8 months and 2 days (achieved)

Spacecraft properties
- Manufacturer: Surrey Satellite Technology
- Launch mass: 100 kilograms (220 lb)
- Payload mass: 40 kilograms (88 lb)
- Dimensions: 65 cm × 65 cm × 72 cm (26 in × 26 in × 28 in)

Start of mission
- Launch date: 2 April 2018, 20:30:38 UTC
- Rocket: Falcon 9 FT
- Launch site: Cape Canaveral SLC-40
- Contractor: SpaceX
- Deployed from: Japanese Experiment Module aboard the ISS
- Deployment date: 20 June 2018

End of mission
- Disposal: Re-entry
- Decay date: 4 December 2021

RemoveDEBRIS was a satellite research project intending to demonstrate various space debris removal technologies. The mission was led by the Surrey Space Centre from the University of Surrey with the satellite's platform manufactured by Surrey Satellite Technology Ltd (SSTL). Partners on the project included Airbus, ArianeGroup, Swiss Center for Electronics and Microtechnology, Inria, Innovative Solutions In Space, Surrey Space Centre, and Stellenbosch University.

== Mission overview ==
Rather than engaging in active debris removal (ADR) of real space debris, the RemoveDEBRIS mission plan was to test the efficacy of several ADR technologies on mock targets in low Earth orbit. In order to complete its planned experiments the platform was equipped with a net, a harpoon, a laser ranging instrument, a dragsail, and two CubeSats (miniature research satellites).

The experiments were as follows:

- Net experiment - One of the CubeSats, called DebrisSat 1, deployed a balloon meant to simulate a piece of space debris. From a short distance away, the RemoveDEBRIS satellite captured the debris in a net and then manoeuvred this package to fall into Earth's atmosphere and burn up.
- Vision-based navigation – The other CubeSat, called DebrisSat 2, was released and the RemoveDEBRIS satellite underwent a series of manoeuvres in order to obtain data and images using both lidar and optical cameras.
- Harpoon and deployable target – A harpoon connected by a tether was fired at a plate attached to an arm extending from the RemoveDEBRIS platform itself.
- Dragsail – After the conclusion of the other experiments the satellite attempted to deploy a large sail to act in a similar fashion to an air brake. The dragsail was supposed to bring RemoveDEBRIS from the relatively low orbital altitude of the space station into the planet's atmosphere to safely disintegrate. In the end, the dragsail failed to deploy.

== Design ==
=== Platform ===
The RemoveDEBRIS platform was based on a SSTL X50 bus that had been customised for deployment from the International Space Station. The platform hosted all the experimental payloads as well as providing power, data and control for the mission. A high degree of autonomy was built in using time-tagged commands to allow experiments to be run out of sight of the groundstation.

=== CubeSats ===
==== DebrisSat 1 ====
The DebrisSat 1 (DS-1, a.k.a. REMDEB-NET, COSPAR 1998-067PM) was built by engineers and students at the University of Surrey and was based on a 2U CubeSat measuring 100 × 100 × 227 mm. 1U of the satellite contained the power and avionics to power the payload. The payload contained an inflatable designed to provide a large target area for the next experiment. A Cold Gas Generator (CGG) was used to inflate six aluminium booms to provide a frame. Small aluminium sails attached to the end of the booms then deployed during the inflation. DebrisSat 1 decayed from orbit on 2 March 2019.

==== DebrisSat 2 ====
The DebrisSat 2 (DS-2, a.k.a. REMDEB-DS2, COSPAR: 1998-067PR) was also based on a 2U CubeSat with two deployable panels solar panels and communications. The spacecraft contained a GPS receiver as well as an inter-satellite link to provide location and attitude data back to the platform to assess the VBN camera performance. The avionics were based on the QB50 avionics stack developed by the Surrey Space Centre and Electronic Systems Laboratory (ESL) at Stellenbosch University. In addition the spacecraft also tested out a low-cost UART camera which was able to beam back pictures to the platform as it separated. DebrisSat 2 deorbited 30 May 2020.

== Timeline ==
=== Launch ===
After final system end-to-end and environmental testing, the RemoveDebris spacecraft was shipped to Nanoracks in Houston and then onto the launch site at the Kennedy Space Centre in Florida. The spacecraft was placed in an ISS cargo transfer bag and placed in the pressurised section of the CRS-14 SpaceX Dragon 1 spacecraft. The Dragon resupply mission with RemoveDEBRIS onboard was launched 2 April 2018, arriving at the ISS on 4 April.

The RemoveDebris spacecraft was unloaded from the capsule. NASA Astronauts Drew Feustel and Ricky Arnold removed the platform handling panels, completed final preparation and loaded the satellite into the Japanese Experiment Module (JEM) airlock on 6 June 2018. An airlock cycle was performed on 19 June 2018 and RemoveDEBRIS moved outside the JEM via the airlock slide table. The spacecraft was grasped by the Kaber interface on the Mobile Servicing System Special Purpose Dexterous Manipulator (MSS SPDM) and placed in the deployment position.

=== Deployment ===
Deployment of the satellite from the station's Kibo module via robotic Canadarm-2 took place on 20 June 2018. At approximately 100 kg, RemoveDEBRIS was the largest satellite to have ever been deployed from the ISS. The platform contained two CubeSat deployers from ISISPACE. The full lifespan of the mission from launch to re-entry was estimated at 1.5 years.

=== Net experiment ===
On 16 September 2018, it demonstrated its ability to use a net to capture a deployed simulated target.

=== VBN experiment ===
On 28 October 2018, DebrisSat 2 was deployed at 06:15UTC. The VBN camera on the platform took 361 images of the spacecraft crucial to determining the performance of the camera system. Position and attitude data from DebrisSat 2 was transmitted back to the platform providing ground truth for the experiment. DebrisSat 2 also forwarded low resolution photos of the deployment to the platform from its own vantage point.

=== Harpoon experiment ===
On 8 February 2019, SSTL demonstrated the RemoveDEBRIS harpoon which was fired at a speed of 20 metres per second penetrating a simulated target extended from the satellite on a 1.5 m (4 ft 11 in) boom.

=== Dragsail experiment ===
The deployment of the dragsail was targeted for 4 March 2019. After the deploy command had been sent, no expected changes in spacecraft behaviour were detected. After an investigation it was determined that the most likely result was a partial or failed deployment of the inflatable boom which prevented the sail from deploying. Lessons learnt from this attempt were put into practice for two new dragsails that were deployed on the Spaceflight SSO-A mission.

== See also ==
- e.Deorbit, a similar concept that was planned to use a net. Cancelled.
