= Al Farabi-1 =

Research satellite launched in 2017

Al-Farabi 1 is a nano-satellite that was successfully launched on February 15, 2017, 3:58 UTC on PSLV-C37 on a record-breaking launch which released 104 satellites.

It is a research satellite designed and built by Al-Farabi Kazakh National University, Almaty, Kazakhstan. The main goal of the project was to solve educational and technological tasks. Cubesat had a 2U form factor. The satellite was equipped with a number of experimental systems and remote sensing nano-camera. SPUTNIX team have developed one of the communication and data transmission systems, as well as antennas, for this satellite.

The satellite reentered the atmosphere on 25 July 2023.

== Specifications ==
Al-Farabi 1 is a 2U CubeSat, weighing 1.7 kg.
