= Irvine CubeSat STEM Program =

Student designed cubesat

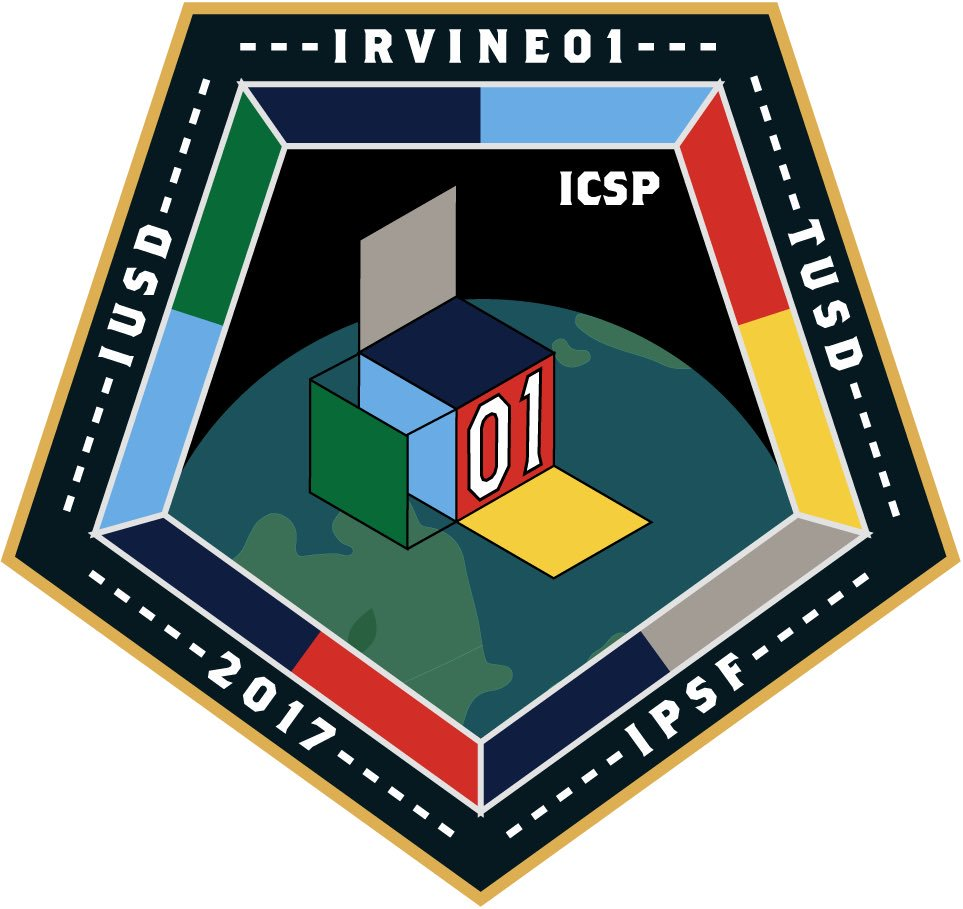
Mission Patch for IRVINE01

Irvine CubeSat STEM Program (ICSP) is a joint educational endeavor to teach, train and inspire the next generation of STEM professionals. ICSP involves students from six high schools from Irvine, California, and its main objective is to assemble, test, and launch a CubeSat into low Earth orbit.

ICSP's initial concepts were conceived by Brent Freeze when he was working with Arnold O. Beckman High School physics teacher Paul Lewanski on a weather balloon project; Freeze later founded the program with Kain Sosa.

The Irvine CubeSat STEM Program was shut down in the 2022 school year. The Irvine Public School Foundation (IPSF) reallocated the CubeSat funding elsewhere and Brent Freeze has left the project to pursue other endeavors. This change could have resulted from the lack of productivity during the COVID-19 pandemic and the loss of talented students. It is rumored that the program could return during the 2023 school year.

== Overview ==
The Irvine CubeSat STEM Program was created in 2015 by Brent Freeze and Kain Sosa. Freeze took inspiration from his work alongside Arnold O. Beckman High School physics teacher Paul Lewanski on a weather balloon project.

Two years after the weather balloon project, Freeze contacted Lewanski about the idea of a CubeSat program. Beckman High School supported the program fully, and became the first ICSP team, Beckman Avionics. Following Beckman High School, Freeze and Sosa interviewed teachers at other high schools in Irvine, and the other subteams were created based on each schools' resources and teacher skill sets.

The Irvine CubeSat STEM Program aims to inspire the next generation of innovative thinkers, creators, programmers, and explorers. ICSP is composed of six public high schools from the Tustin and Irvine School Districts: Arnold O. Beckman High School; Irvine High School; Northwood High School (Irvine, California); Portola High School; University High School (Irvine, California); and Woodbridge High School (Irvine, California). Each school is given a specific role for the CubeSat missions, such as communications, propulsion, or power.

| High school | Lead for team: |
|---|---|
| Arnold O. Beckman High School | Avionics |
| Irvine High School | Propulsion |
| Northwood High School | Power |
| Portola High School | BioTech |
| University High School | Prime |
| Woodbridge High School | Communications |

Team members for the program's inaugural mission, IRVINE01, were selected in 2016. Tyvak Nano-Satellite Systems provided engineering support and served as ICSP's integration partner. The Ecuadorian Civilian Space Agency also provided support as well as the deployable solar arrays, the batteries and the radiation shielding panels.

ICSP's first nano-satellite, IRVINE01, was launched on November 10, 2018, on a Rocket Lab Electron entitled "It's Business Time". ICSP's second nanosatellite, IRVINE02, was launched on December 3, 2018, on a SpaceX Falcon 9 as part of the Spaceflight Industries' rideshare mission, SSO-A Smallsat Express. The high schools have already begun work on their next CubeSat: IRVINE03.

In addition to building CubeSats, ICSP educates hosts a guest speaker series with expert insight into space and technology. To date, guest speakers included Jordi Puig-Suari (co-inventor of the CubeSat standard), Commander Ronnie Nader (from the Ecuadorian Civilian Space Agency), Michael Minovitch (gravity assist maneuver), NASA Astronaut Mike Massimino, and Pamela Clark (Director of the Jet Propulsion Laboratory CubeSat Development Lab).

The Irvine Public School Foundation (IPSF) is a sponsor of ICSP, providing over $150,000 in funding annually with the support of corporate sponsors: FivePoint, Ingersoll-Rand/Trane, Google, Cisco Systems, Resilient, Microsemi, and the Arnold and Mabel Beckman Foundation .

== Satellites ==
=== IRVINE01 ===
IRVINE01 is an educational 1U CubeSat mission that gives high school students the experience of building, testing, and controlling a nano-satellite to develop interest and talent in the science and engineering fields. The mission features a camera, which will be used to take pictures of nearby celestial objects, as well as the first in orbital ion electrospray thruster developed by Accion Systems. Other technology aboard include deployable solar arrays and magnetorquers, both supplied by the Ecuadorian Space Agency.

IRVINE01 was launched from Rocket Lab Launch Complex 1 on November 11, 2018, as part of an Electron rocket mission operated by Rocket Lab entitled It's Business Time.

IRVINE01 reentered the atmosphere on February 3, 2023.

=== IRVINE02 ===
ICSP's second and third CubeSats have been selected by NASA to participate in NASA's Educational Launch of Nanosatellites (ELaNa). IRVINE02 features an ion electrospray thruster, the second of Accion Systems thrusters to reach orbit. Beyond the thruster, IRVINE02 utilizes magnetorquers, deployable solar arrays, a GPS unit, and a laser to transmit pictures and data back to Earth. It is one of the smallest CubeSats with an onboard electric propulsion system.

IRVINE02 launched from Vandenberg Air Force Base on December 3, 2018, as part of NASA's ELaNa educational program aboard a SpaceX Falcon 9 alongside 64 other spacecraft on the mission SSO-A: Smallsat Express.

IRVINE02 reentered the atmosphere on 16 February 2026.

=== IRVINE03 ===
On March 2, 2018, NASA selected IRVINE03 to take part in NASA's ninth round of NASA CubeSat candidates. IRVINE03 will include a technology demonstration of an X-ray Cadmium Zinc Telluride (CZT) sensor and electrospray thrusters. IRVINE 03 was expected to launch in mid 2020, but the launch was delayed due to the COVID-19 pandemic. The launch is further delayed due to leadership problems.
