= S-Net =

- Manufacturer: Technische Universität Berlin
- Country of origin: Germany
- Operator: Technische Universität Berlin
- Applications: inter-satellite communications

Specifications
- Launch mass: 9 kilograms (20 lb)
- Power: solar cells, batteries
- Equipment: S-Band transceiver
- Regime: Low Earth Orbit
- Design life: 1 year

Production
- Status: In Service
- Built: 4
- Launched: 4
- Operational: 4

S-Net is a worldwide inter-satellite communications network consisting of four satellites and being operated by Technische Universität Berlin.

== Description ==
The project has the goal to investigate and demonstrate inter-satellite communication technology within a distributed and autonomously operating nanosatellite network. All satellites are equipped with a S-Band radio emitter and receiver, which not only enables communication with the ground-based control center but also allows for communication between the individual satellites. The number of satellites in the network was set to four as this number represents the best cost-benefit-ratio. With four satellites, a total of six independent communication links are possible, while only three are possible with three satellites. Moreover, four is the lowest number that enables multi-hop communication. The satellites are powered by solar cells and batteries and have a planned lifetime of one year. Future applications of the technology may be more effective monitoring of global issues like climate change, disaster management, maritime systems monitoring and even enable satellite constellations for high-bandwidth internet access.

== Launch ==
The four satellites were successfully launched on a Soyuz-2.1A rocket from Vostochny Site 1S in Russia on 1 February 2018. The launch was originally scheduled for 22 December 2017, however due to the failure of a Soyuz-2.1B rocket, Roscosmos decided to delay the mission. The spacecraft were released into orbit at an altitude of approximately 580 kilometers at an interval of 10 seconds. The launch represents the tenth mission of the TU Berlin, sending a total of 16 satellites to space.

== See also ==
- 2018 in spaceflight
- Iridium satellite constellation
