= Sputnix =

Russian satellite construction company

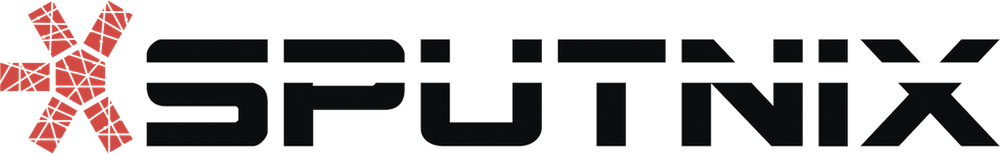
- Industry: Commercial spaceflight
- Founded: 2011
- Headquarters: Moscow, Skolkovo, 42, Russia
- Key people: Vladislav Ivanenko (CEO)
- Website: sputnix.ru

Sputnix (Russian: спутникс, also спутниковые инновационные космические системы, "Satellite Innovative Space Systems") is a privately-owned satellite construction company headquartered at the Skolkovo Innovation Center. It is one of Russia's first private space companies. It was founded in 2011 by ScanEx.

== History ==
Sputnix was established in 2011 by the ScanEx satellite technology department, which developed the orientation and stabilization system of the Chibis-M microsatellite by order of the Russian Space Research Institute. It is based at the Skolkovo Innovation Center.

In 2013, Sputnix received a license from the Russian Federal Space Agency to carry out space activities and began to create microsatellite technology-demonstrator TabletSat-Aurora.

On June 19, 2014, Tabletsat-Aurora was launched into Low Earth orbit on a Ukrainian launch vehicle, the Dnepr rocket implementing a contract between Sputnix and ISC Kosmotras. In 2017, Sputnix developed the Orbiсraft-Pro satellite platform based on the international CubeSat standard. The OrbiСraft-Pro platform is a design kit that allows the assembly of various configurations of nanosatellites with different payloads. The scientific and educational satellites SiriusSat-1 (COSPAR 1998-067PG; decayed from orbit 9 December 2020) and SiriusSat-2 (COSPAR 1998-067PH; decayed from orbit 9 December 2020) were created with the OrbiСraft-Pro platform, and launched from the International Space Station on August 15, 2018.

== Main activities ==
Sputnix develops orientation and stabilization systems and other service systems for microsatellites and CubeSat satellites; microsatellite and CubeSat platforms, allowing the quick creation of satellites for technological, scientific and educational experiments; equipment and software for ground communication stations; attitude determination and control system (ADCS) test benches for research of small satellites dynamics in the simulated space environment of zero gravity, homogenous unsteady magnetic field, sunlight, sky of stars; and equipment for aerospace education.

== International activity ==
Sputnix is known as an experienced producer and exporter in the space field. The company assists educational aerospace laboratories and aerospace education for schools and universities. Sputnix delivers satellite functional kits, data receiving ground stations, space environment simulators and equipment, accompanied by educational materials.

== Satellites ==
Name	Weight, kg	Launch date	Launch vehicle	Purpose
Chibis-М	34,4	25.01.2012	Progress M-13M	Scientific sat
TabletSat-Aurora	26	19.06.2014	Dnepr rocket	RS
Al Farabi-1	2	15.02.2017	PSLV-C37	Ed-Tech sat, RS
SiriusSat-1	1,45	15.08.2018	Progress MS-09	Ed-Scientific sat
SiriusSat-2	1,45	15.08.2018	Progress MS-09	Ed-Scientific sat
NRU HSE - DZZ	3,5	22.03.2021	Soyuz rocket	Ed-Scientific sat
Sirius-DZZ	3,5	22.03.2021	Soyuz rocket	Ed-Scientific sat
OrbiCraft-Zorkiy	8	22.03.2021	Soyuz rocket	RS
KSU-CubeSat	1,1	22.03.2021	Soyuz rocket	Ed-Scientific sat
ChallengeOne	2,1	22.03.2021	Soyuz rocket	Ed-Scientific sat
«SXC3-214-MIET-AIS»	4	09.08.2022	Soyuz rocket	Ed-Scientific sat
«SXC3-219 ISOI»	4	09.08.2022	Soyuz rocket	Ed-Scientific sat
«SXC3-2110 Voenmeh»	4	09.08.2022	Soyuz rocket	Ed-Scientific sat
«SXC3-217 Siren»	4	09.08.2022	Soyuz rocket	Ed-Scientific sat
«SXC3-215 Vizard»	4	09.08.2022	Soyuz rocket	Ed-Scientific sat
«CubeSX-HSE-2»	4	09.08.2022	Soyuz rocket	Ed-Scientific sat
«SXC3-218 KuzSTU»	4	09.08.2022	Soyuz rocket	Ed-Scientific sat
«ReshUCube-1»	4	09.08.2022	Soyuz rocket	Ed-Scientific sat
«UTMN»	4	09.08.2022	Soyuz rocket	Ed-Scientific sat
«Monitor-1»	4	09.08.2022	Soyuz rocket	Ed-Scientific sat
