= Swarm Technologies =

US telecommunications company

Swarm Technologies, Inc.
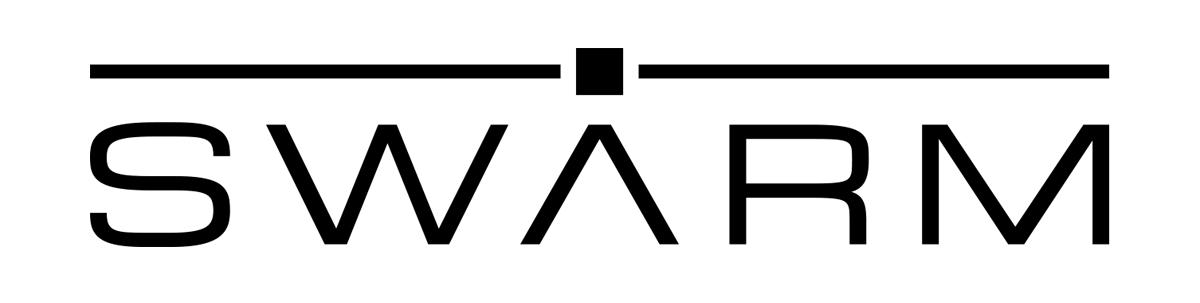
- Company type: Subsidiary
- Industry: Telecommunications
- Founded: 2016; 10 years ago
- Founders: Sara Spangelo (CEO); Ben Longmier
- Headquarters: Palo Alto, California, U.S.
- Number of employees: 30 (2021)
- Parent: SpaceX

Swarm Technologies, Inc. is a company building a low Earth orbit satellite constellation for communications with Internet of Things (IoT) devices using a store and forward design. Social Capital partners Jay Zaveri and Arjun Sethi incubated and seed funded Swarm, Craft Ventures was an early investor. On 16 July 2021, Swarm agreed to become a wholly owned subsidiary of SpaceX.

In-Q-Tel, the venture capital arm of the CIA, lists Swarm Technologies as one of their startups.

They have a Federal Communications Commission (FCC) licence for low bandwidth communications satellites in low Earth orbit.

In 2018, Swarm became the first U.S. company found to have deployed satellites without regulatory approval after an FCC investigation into the startup's launch of its first four picosatellites on an Indian PSLV rocket in January of that year.

In 2019, Swarm raised $25 million in a Series A funding round led by EarthLink founder Sky Dayton and PayPal co-founder David Sacks.

The Swarm Tile is its dedicated two-way satellite data modem designed to be low energy and embedded on the PCB of third-party products. Other products include a data plan and a development kit.

In July 2023, the company stopped new device sales.

In March 2025, the service was stopped. The company's URL (swarm.space) now forwards to SpaceX' direct to device infopage.

== History ==
Swarm Technologies was founded in 2016 by Sara Spangelo and Benjamin Longmier, former employees of Google and Apple, respectively.

The company became widely known in industry circles after launching its first four test satellites illegally in 2018. The responsible US regulatory authority, FCC, had refused the license for the start-up because they feared that the satellites could be too small to be recognized by the space surveillance systems. They could become particularly dangerous, turning into "invisible" space debris. Despite this, the satellites, and around 30 other payloads were launched on an Indian PSLV rocket. The FCC imposed a $900,000 fine for this. The housing of the next test satellites was then enlarged. Together with correspondingly enlarged radar reflectors and a GPS-based position transmitter, the increased traceability permitted licensing to be achieved.

The construction of the actual constellation began with the launch of twelve third-generation SpaceBEEs on September 3, 2020, on a European Vega rocket. After an additional 48 SpaceBEE satellites were launched by the end of January 2021, commercial operations of the constellation began.

By December 2020, Swarm had launched 9 test satellites and 36 of a planned 150 low Earth orbit satellites to provide communication with IOT devices.

In February 2021, Swarm announced that its commercial services were now live using 72 commercial satellites providing its global low-cost data service to customers.

In July 2021, SpaceX acquired Swarm for $524 million.

In July 2023, the company stopped new device sales. As of November 2024, the website of the company redirects to SpaceX's upcoming direct-to-cell feature.

On 27 September 2024, existing customers were advised the following. "Based on our most recent simulations and modeling, we regret to inform you that service and support for the Swarm commercial network will cease 90 days from today, and your data service plans with Swarm will terminate as of such date."

== Technology and use ==
The third-generation SpaceBEE satellites weigh around 400 grams and, like the first generation, have a 0.25U CubeSat format; according to the manufacturer, they are about 11 × 11 × 2.8 centimeters in size. The second generation is 1U cubesats. Solar cells for the power supply are located on the top and the bottom. The antenna for communication with the ground stations is wrapped around the satellite when launched and unfolds after the release into space. The data exchange is performed in a relatively small bandwidth, on the one hand with the end devices and on the other with ground stations connected to the Internet. After the constellation is completed, at least three satellites should always be reachable from any point on earth.

Swarm Technologies in 2020 offered data transfer plans starting at $60 per year per connected device. At this price, 750 data packets of 192 bytes each can be transmitted monthly.

== 2018 controversy and fine ==
As a US corporation, Swarm is required to follow US space regulatory procedures. In April 2017, Swarm applied for FCC permission to obtain an experimental radio service license for its initial picosatellites. The FCC rejected the application in December 2017 due to concerns about tracking because of the tiny size of the satellites (measuring 0.25U CubeSat size), but they were launched from India the following month.

After the launch was reported, an authorized April 2018 launch of more satellites was immediately delayed when FCC permission was withdrawn. An FCC investigation found that Swarm had not only launched the four unauthorized satellites but also unlawfully transmitted signals between them and earth stations in Georgia. The investigation also discovered that Swarm had performed various other equipment tests before the launch without required FCC authorizations, including between weather balloons and ground stations.

Industry reaction was also highly negative, fearing disruption from uncoordinated activity and enhanced future regulation. Spaceflight Inc., which had arranged the Indian launch as a rideshare, changed its processes to check that customers have the proper licenses.

The settlement required Swarm to pay a penalty of $900,000 and to follow a strict compliance plan to prevent future violations. This included submitting additional details to the FCC at least 45 days before a planned launch for the next three years.

While it was noted that the fine was relatively small, it had been increased from an initial amount agreed between the company and the FCC Enforcement Bureau. An FCC Commissioner observed that the negative publicity would probably prevent repetitions by Swarm or others.

== Satellite constellation ==
- SpaceBEE is a constellation of picosatellites, predominantly in the CubeSat 0.25U form factor, intended to reach a quantity of 150. SpaceBEE test models 5 to 9 were larger to assuage concerns about radar tracking. Swarm's website lists the satellites' mass at 400 g and size at 110 × 110 × 28 mm.
- SpaceBEE NZ is another constellation of satellites by Swarm Technologies. As of November 2024, 22 SpaceBEE NZ satellites have been launched, and all have decayed from orbit. The last SpaceBEE NZ (SpaceBEE NZ 22) decayed from orbit 23 January 2024.

SpaceBee launches
Flight No.	Mission	COSPAR ID	Date and time (UTC)	Launch site	Launch vehicle	Orbit altitude	Inclination	Number deployed	Deorbited	Outcome
1	SpaceBEE 1–4	2018–004	12 January 2018, 03:59:00	Satish Dhawan Space Centre, FLP	PSLV-XL	520 km (320 mi)	97.6°	4	4	Success
1	SpaceBEE 1–4	2018–004	Four experimental satellites SpaceBEE, built to the 0.25U CubeSat are to demonstrate two-way satellite communications and data relay for Swarm Technologies Inc.							
2	SpaceBEE 5–7	2018–099	3 December 2018, 18:34:05	Vandenberg, SLC-4E	Falcon 9 B5	580 km (360 mi)	97.8°	3	3	Success
2	SpaceBEE 5–7	2018–099	Three experimental satellites SpaceBEE.							
3	SpaceBEE 8–9	2019–037	29 June 2019, 04:30:00	Mahia, LC-1A	Electron	460 km (290 mi)	45.0°	2	2	Success
3	SpaceBEE 8–9	2019–037	Two experimental satellites SpaceBEE.							
4	SpaceBEE 10–21	2020–061	3 September 2020, 01:51:10	Kourou, ELV	Vega	535 km (332 mi)	97.5°	12	12	Success
4	SpaceBEE 10–21	2020–061	Twelve commercial satellites SpaceBEE.							
5	SpaceBEE 22–39 SpaceBEE NZ-1 to NZ-6	2020–085	20 November 2020, 02:20:01	Mahia, LC-1A	Electron	520 km (320 mi)	97.4°	24 (6 NZ)	24 (6 NZ)	Success
5	SpaceBEE 22–39 SpaceBEE NZ-1 to NZ-6	2020–085	Eighteen commercial satellites SpaceBEE and 6 commercial satellites SpaceBEE NZ-1 to NZ-6.							
6	SpaceBEE 40–75	2021–006	24 January 2021, 15:00:00	CCSFS, SLC-40	Falcon 9 B5			36	36	Success
6	SpaceBEE 40–75	2021–006	Thirty-six commercial satellites SpaceBEE.							
7	SpaceBEE 76–87	2021–015	28 February 2021, 04:53:00	SDSC, FLP	PSLV-DL			12	12	Success
7	SpaceBEE 76–87	2021–015	Twelve commercial satellites SpaceBEE.							
8	SpaceBEE 88–111 SpaceBEE NZ 7–10	2021–059	30 June 2021, 19:31:00	CCSFS, SLC-40	Falcon 9 B5	523 km (325 mi)	97.5°	28 (4 NZ)	28 (4 NZ)	Success
8	SpaceBEE 88–111 SpaceBEE NZ 7–10	2021–059	Twenty-four commercial satellites SpaceBEE and four commercial satellites SpaceBEE NZ.							
9	SpaceBEE 112–127 SpaceBEE NZ 11–14	2022–026	15 March 2022, 16:22:00	Kodiak, LP-3B	Rocket 3.3	525 km (326 mi)	97.5°	20 (4 NZ)	20 (4 NZ)	Success
9	SpaceBEE 112–127 SpaceBEE NZ 11–14	2022–026	16 commercial satellites SpaceBEE and 4 commercial satellites SpaceBEE NZ.							
10	SpaceBEE 128–139	2022–033	1 April 2022, 16:24:16	CCSFS, SLC-40	Falcon 9 B5	480 km (300 mi)	97.4°	12	12	Success
10	SpaceBEE 128–139	2022–033	12 commercial satellites SpaceBEE.							
11	SpaceBEE 140–155 SpaceBEE NZ 15–22	2022–047	2 May 2022, 22:49:52	Mahia, LC-1A	Electron	510 km (320 mi)	97.4°	24 (8 NZ)	24 (8 NZ)	Success
11	SpaceBEE 140–155 SpaceBEE NZ 15–22	2022–047	16 commercial satellites SpaceBEE and 8 commercial satellites SpaceBEE NZ.							
12	SpaceBEE 156–167	2023–001	3 January 2023, 14:56:00	CCSFS, SLC-40	Falcon 9 B5	520 km (320 mi)	97.5°	12	12	Success
12	SpaceBEE 156–167	2023–001	12 commercial satellites SpaceBEE.							
13	SpaceBEE 168–179	2023–084	12 June 2023, 21:35:00	VSFB, SLC-4E	Falcon 9 B5	520 km (320 mi)	97.5°	12	11	Success
13	SpaceBEE 168–179	2023–084	12 commercial satellites SpaceBEE.							
