= Progress MS-09 =

2018 Russian resupply spaceflight to the ISS

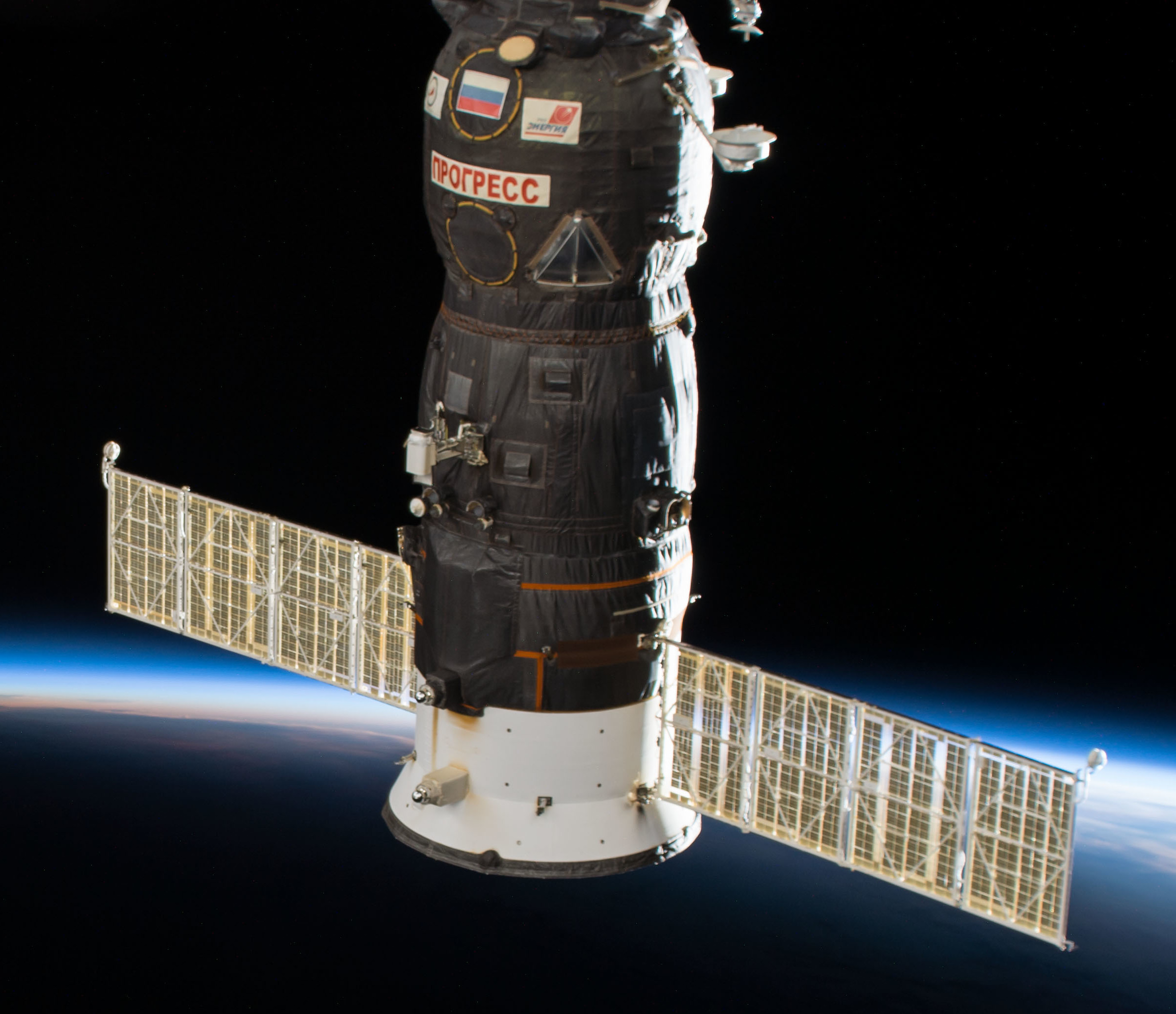
- Progress MS-09 docked at the ISS on 4 October 2018
- Names: Progress 70P
- Mission type: ISS resupply
- Operator: Roscosmos
- COSPAR ID: 2018-058A
- SATCAT no.: 43537
- Mission duration: 200 days

Spacecraft properties
- Spacecraft: Progress MS-09 s/n 439
- Spacecraft type: Progress-MS
- Manufacturer: Energia
- Launch mass: 7281 kg
- Payload mass: 2450 kg

Start of mission
- Launch date: 9 July 2018, 21:51:34 UTC
- Rocket: Soyuz-2.1a (s/n N15000-033)
- Launch site: Baikonur, Site 31/6
- Contractor: RKTs Progress

End of mission
- Disposal: Deorbited
- Decay date: 25 January 2019

Orbital parameters
- Reference system: Geocentric orbit
- Regime: Low Earth orbit
- Inclination: 51.67°
- Epoch: 9 July 2018

Docking with ISS
- Docking port: Pirs nadir
- Docking date: 10 July 2018, 01:31:33 UTC
- Undocking date: 25 January 2019, 12:55 UTC
- Time docked: 199 days

Cargo
- Mass: 2450 kg
- Pressurised: 1230 kg
- Fuel: 705 kg
- Gaseous: 50 kg
- Water: 420 kg

Progress MS-09 (Russian: Прогресс МC-09), identified by NASA as Progress 70P, was a Progress spaceflight operated by Roscosmos to resupply the International Space Station (ISS). This was the 161st flight of a Progress spacecraft.

== History ==
The Progress-MS is an uncrewed freighter based on the Progress-M featuring improved avionics. This improved variant first launched on 21 December 2015. It has the following improvements:

- New external compartment that enables it to deploy satellites. Each compartment can hold up to four launch containers. First time installed on Progress MS-03.
- Enhanced redundancy thanks to the addition of a backup system of electrical motors for the docking and sealing mechanism.
- Improved Micrometeoroid (MMOD) protection with additional panels in the cargo compartment.
- Luch Russian relay satellites link capabilities enable telemetry and control even when not in direct view of ground radio stations.
- GNSS autonomous navigation enables real time determination of the status vector and orbital parameters dispensing with the need of ground station orbit determination.
- Real time relative navigation thanks to direct radio data exchange capabilities with the space station.
- New digital radio that enables enhanced TV camera view for the docking operations.
- The Ukrainian Chezara Kvant-V on board radio system and antenna/feeder system has been replaced with a Unified Command Telemetry System (UCTS).
- Replacement of the Kurs A with Kurs NA digital system.

== Launch ==
Progress MS-09 launched on 9 July 2018 from the Baikonur Cosmodrome in Kazakhstan. It used a Soyuz-2.1a rocket. NASA confirmed on 28 June 2018 that if Progress MS-09 launches on 9 July 2018, the mission succeeded a super fast-tracked rendezvous with the Station, docking to the ISS just 3 hours (2 orbits) after launch - making it the fastest orbital rendezvous ever-attempted with the International Space Station.

== Docking ==
Progress MS-09 docked as scheduled with the nadir docking port of the Pirs module on 10 July 2018 at 01:31 UTC.

The new version features the upgraded Kurs-NA rendezvous system, featuring the AO-753A antenna replaced the earlier 2AO-VKA antenna and three AKR-VKA antennas, while two older 2ASF-M-VKA antennas are retained. Kurs-NA will increase the reliability and safety during docking operations. The new SUD flight control system allows for autonomous trajectory measurements using the GLONASS (Uragan) navigation satellites. The communications system is also upgraded to use the Luch-5 data relay satellites. Also improvements were made to the micrometeoroid protection, the lighting system and the docking port.

== Cargo ==
The Progress MS-09 spacecraft delivered 2,450 kg of cargo and supplies to the International Space Station. The following is a breakdown of cargo bound for the ISS:

- Dry cargo: 1,275 kg
- Fuel: 705 kg
- Oxygen and Air: 50 kg
- Water: 420 kg

== Cubesats ==
Beginning with the Progress MS-03, the Progress can optionally carry four CubeSat deployers for a total of 24 CubeSat-units.

== Undocking and decay ==
Undocking occurred on 25 January 2019, at 12:55 UTC. Later that day, the spacecraft burned up in the atmosphere and its debris fell into the Pacific Ocean.
