= List of government space agencies =

Government space agencies are bodies established by national governments, or by regional agencies representing groups of countries, to advocate for and engage in activities relating to outer space, including the operation of space systems, and space exploration.

Their objectives include the use of remote sensing data, communications, education, and economic development. Most agencies are civil rather than military bodies, established to advance the benefits of exploring and using space. They range from small agencies with limited budgets to large national or regional organizations such as the National Aeronautics and Space Administration (NASA) of the United States, the European Space Agency (ESA) which coordinates for more than 20 constituent countries, the Japan Aerospace Exploration Agency (JAXA), the State Corporation for Space Activities "Roscosmos" (Roscosmos) of Russia, the Indian Space Research Organisation (ISRO), and the China National Space Administration (CNSA).

The space agency listings are segregated to enable identification of subsets of the complete list that have advanced to higher levels or technical or programmatic proficiency in accordance with the following:

- Establishment of agency, initial exploitation of space-based systems
- Development of launch capability
- Capacity for extraterrestrial exploration
- Demonstration of human spaceflight capability across one or more of these domains

== Overview ==
As of 2024, nearly 80 different government space agencies are in existence, including more than 70 national space agencies and several international agencies.

Overview of space agencies
Space agency				Demonstrated capability			
Country or organization	Name	Acronym	Founded	First space traveler	Operates satellites	Builds satellites	Recoverable payloads capable
African Union	African Space Agency	AfSA	24 Jan 2023	No	No	No	No
Algeria	Algerian Space Agency	ASAL	16 Jan 2002	No	Yes (Alcomsat-1)	Yes (AlSAT-1)	No
Argentina	National Space Activities Commission	CONAE	1961 (CNIE); 28 May 1991 (CONAE)	No	Yes (Nahuel 1A)	Yes (ARSAT-1)	No
Australia	Australian Space Agency	ASA	1986 (NSP); 1 Jul 2018 (ASA)	Yes (Paul Scully-Power)	Yes (Aussat A1)	Yes (WRESAT)	No
Austria	Austrian Space Agency	ALR	12 Jul 1972	Yes (Franz Viehböck)	Yes (TUGSAT-1/UniBRITE-1)	Yes (TUGSAT-1/UniBRITE-1)	No
Azerbaijan	Space Agency of the Republic of Azerbaijan (Azercosmos)	Azercosmos	2010	Yes (Tuva Cihangir Atasever)	Yes (Azerspace-1)	Yes (Azersky-2)	No
Bahrain	Bahrain Space Agency	BSA	2014	No	Yes; AlMunther	Yes; AlMunther	No
Bangladesh	Bangladesh Space Research and Remote Sensing Organization	SPARRSO	1980	No	Yes (Bangladesh Satellite-1)	Yes (BRAC Onnesha)	No
Belgium	Royal Belgian Institute for Space Aeronomy	BIRA; IASB; BISA	25 Nov 1964	Yes (Dirk Frimout)	No	Yes (PROBA-1)	No
Brazil	Brazilian Space Agency	AEB	10 Feb 1994	Yes (Marcos Pontes)	Yes (Brasilsat A1)	Yes (Amazônia-1)	No
Bulgaria	Space Research and Technology Institute	SRI-BAS; STIL-BAS	1987	Yes (Georgi Ivanov)	Yes (Bulgaria 1300)	Yes (Bulgaria 1300)	No
Canada	Canadian Space Agency	CSA; ASC	1 Mar 1989	Yes (Marc Garneau)	Yes (Alouette 1)	Yes (Alouette 1)	No
Chile	Chilean Space Agency	CSA	2001	No	Yes	Yes	No
China	China National Space Administration	CNSA	22 Apr 1993	Yes (Yang Liwei)	Yes	Yes (Dong Fang Hong 1)	Yes
Costa Rica	Costa Rican Space Agency (Agencia Espacial Costarricense)	AEC	2021	No	Yes (Irazú)	Yes (Irazú)	No
International (Italy) Agenzia Spaziale Italiana (ASI) (United Kingdom) British National Space Centre (BNSC) (Canada) Canadian Space Agency (CSA) (France) Centre National d’Études Spatiales (CNES); China National Space Administration (CNSA) (Germany) Deutsches Zentrum für Luft und Raumfahrt (DLR); European Space Agency (ESA) (Brazil) Instituto Nacional de Pesquisas Espaciais (INPE); Japan Aerospace Exploration Agency (JAXA) (United States) National Aeronautics and Space Administration (NASA) (Russia) Russian Federal Space Agency (RFSA)	Consultative Committee for Space Data Systems	CCSDS	1982	No	No	No	No
International Algeria; Argentina; Armenia; Australia; Austria; Belgium; Brazil; Bulgaria; Canada; Chile; China; Czech Republic; Denmark; Egypt; Finland; France; Germany; Greece; Hungary; India; Indonesia; Iran; Iraq; Israel; Italy; Japan; Kazakhstan; South Korea; Malaysia; Mexico; Morocco; Netherlands; Nigeria; Norway; Pakistan; Poland; Portugal; Romania; Russia; Saudi Arabia; Slovakia; South Africa; Spain; Sweden; Switzerland; Taiwan; Thailand; Turkey; Ukraine; United Arab Emirates; United Kingdom; United States; Caribbean Community	Committee on Space Research	COSPAR	1958	No	No	No	No
Czech Republic	Department of Space Activities at the Ministry of Transport (Czech Republic) & Czech Space Team	MoT	2008	Yes (Vladimír Remek)	Yes (Magion 4)	Yes (VZLUSAT-2)	No
Denmark	Danish National Space Center	DNSC; DTU Space	1 Jan 1968 (DSRI); 1 Jan 2005 (DNSC)	Yes (Andreas Mogensen)	Yes (Ørsted)	Yes (Ørsted)	No
Egypt	Egyptian Space Agency	EGSA; NARSS; EASRT-RSC	2018; 1994; 1971–1994	Yes (Sara Sabry)	Yes (EgyptSat 1)	Yes (NARSSCube-1)	No
El Salvador	Instituto Aeroespacial de El Salvador(Esai)	ESAI	2021	No	No	No	No
Ethiopia	Ethiopian Space Science and Technology Institute	ESSTI	14 Oct 2016	No	Yes; ETRSS-1	Yes; ETRSS-1	No
Austria; Belgium; Czech Republic; Denmark; Estonia; European Union; Finland; France; Germany; Greece; Hungary; Ireland; Italy; Luxembourg; Netherlands; Norway; Poland; Portugal; Romania; Spain; Sweden; Switzerland; Slovenia; United Kingdom	European Space Agency	ESA; ASE; EWO	1964 (ESRO/ELDO); 30 May 1975 (ESA)	Yes (Ulf Merbold)	Yes (Cos-B)	Yes (Cos-B)	Yes
European Union	European Union Agency for the Space Programme	EUSPA	12 Jul 2004 (GSA); 21 May 2021 (EUSPA)	No	Yes	No	No
France	National Centre for Space Studies	CNES	19 Dec 1961	Yes (Jean-Loup Chrétien)	Yes (Astérix)	Yes (Astérix)	No
Germany	German Aerospace Center	DLR	1969	Yes (Sigmund Jähn)	Yes	Yes (Azur)	No
Ghana	Ghana Space Science and Technology Centre	GSSTI	2 Apr 2012	No	Yes (GhanaSat-1)	Yes (GhanaSat-1)	No
Greece	Hellenic Space Center; Ελληνικό Κέντρο Διαστήματος	HSC; ΕΛΚΕΔ	9 Aug 2019	No	Yes (Hellas Sat 2)	Yes (UPSat)	No
Hungary	Hungarian Space Office	MŰI; HSO	Jan 1992	Yes (Bertalan Farkas)	Yes (MaSat-1)	Yes (MaSat-1)	No
India	Indian Space Research Organisation	ISRO इसरो	1962 (INCOSPAR); 15 August 1969 (ISRO)	Yes (Rakesh Sharma)	Yes (Aryabhata)	Yes (Aryabhata)	Yes
Indonesia	Indonesian Space Agency (Previously LAPAN)	INASA	3 Nov 2022; 27 Nov 1964 (LAPAN)	No	Yes (Palapa-A1)	Yes (Lapan-TUBsat)	No
Iran	Iranian Space Agency	ISA	1996	No	Yes (Sina-1)	Yes (Omid)	Yes (Pishgam)
Israel	Israel Space Agency	ISA סוכנות החלל הישראלית	Apr 1983	Yes (Ilan Ramon)	Yes (Ofeq-1)	Yes (Shavit 2)	No
Italy	Italian Space Agency	ASI	1988	Yes (Franco Malerba)	Yes (San Marco 1)	Yes (San Marco 1)	No
Japan	Japan Aerospace Exploration Agency	JAXA ジャクサ	1 Oct 2003	Yes (Toyohiro Akiyama)	Yes (Ohsumi)	Yes (Ohsumi)	Yes
Kazakhstan	National Space Agency of the Republic of Kazakhstan	KazCosmos; KazKosmos	27 Mar 2007	Yes (Toktar Aubakirov)	Yes (KazSat-1)	Yes (Al Farabi-1)	No
Kenya	Kenya Space Agency	KSA	7 Mar 2017	No	Yes (1KUNS-PF)	Yes (1KUNS-PF)	No
North Korea	National Aerospace Technology Administration	NATA	1980s (KCST) 2013 (NADA) 2023 (NATA)	No	Yes (Kwangmyŏngsŏng-3 Unit 2)	Yes (Kwangmyŏngsŏng-3 Unit 2)	No
South Korea	Korea AeroSpace Administration	KASA 우주청	27 May 2024	No	No	No	No
South Korea	Korea Aerospace Research Institute	KARI 항우연	10 Oct 1989	Yes (Yi So-yeon)	Yes (Koreasat 1)	Yes (KITSAT-1)	No
CELAC	Latin American and Caribbean Space Agency	ALCE	2022	No	No	No	No
Lithuania	Lithuanian Space Association	LSA	2007	No	Yes (LituanicaSAT-1)	Yes (LituanicaSAT-1)	No
Luxembourg	Luxembourg Space Agency	LSA	Sep 2018	No	Yes (Astra 1A)	Yes (KSM (Kleos Scouting Mission))	No
Malaysia	Malaysian Space Agency	MYSA	2002	Yes (Sheikh Muszaphar Shukor)	Yes (MEASAT-1)	Yes (TiungSAT-1)	No
Mexico	Mexican Space Agency	AEM	30 Jul 2010	Yes (Rodolfo Vela)	Yes (Morelos I)	Yes (UNAMSAT B)	No
Mongolia	National Remote Sensing Center of Mongolia	NRSC	1991	Yes (Gurragchaa Jugderdemid)	Yes (Mazaalai)	Yes (Mazaalai)	No
Morocco	Royal Center for Remote Sensing; Centre Royal de Télédétection Spatiale; Ammas Amrrukan n Tallunt (المركز الملكي للإستشعار البعدي الفضائي)	CRTS	Dec 1989	No	Yes (Maroc-Tubsat)	Yes (Maroc-Tubsat)	No
Netherlands	Netherlands Institute for Space Research	SRON	1983	Yes (Wubbo Ockels)	Yes (ANS)	Yes (ANS)	No
New Zealand	New Zealand Space Agency	NZSA	Apr 2016	No	Yes (Humanity Star)	Yes (Humanity Star)	No
Nigeria	National Space Research and Development Agency	NASRDA	1998	No	Yes (Nigeriasat-1)	Yes (Nigeria EduSat-1)	No
Norway	Norwegian Space Agency	NRS; NSC	1987	No	Yes (Thor 2)	Yes (nCube-2)	No
Pakistan	Pakistan Space and Upper Atmosphere Research Commission	SUPARCO سپارکو	16 Sep 1961 (started working from 1964)	Yes (Namira Salim)	Yes (Badr-1)	Yes (Badr-1)	No
Paraguay	Paraguayan Space Agency (Agencia Espacial de Paraguay)	AEP	26 Mar 2014	No	Yes (GuaraníSat-1)	Yes (GuaraníSat-1)	No
Peru	National Commission for Aerospace Research and Development	CONIDA	11 Jun 1974	No	Yes (Chasqui I)	Yes	No
Philippines	Philippine Space Agency	PhilSA	2014 (DOST–ASTI); 8 August 2019 (PhilSA)	No	Yes (Agila-1)	Yes (Diwata-1)	No
Poland	Polish Space Agency	POLSA	29 Sep 1976 (CBK PAN); 26 Sep 2014 (POLSA)	Yes (Mirosław Hermaszewski)	Yes (Lem)	Yes (Lem)	No
Portugal	Portuguese Space Agency	PTSPACE	2019	No	Yes (PoSAT-1)	Yes (PoSAT-1)	No
Romania	Romanian Space Agency	ASR; ROSA	1991	Yes (Dumitru Prunariu)	Yes (Goliat)	Yes (Goliat)	No
Russia	Roscosmos State Corporation for Space Activities	Roscosmos; Роскосмос	25 Feb 1992	Yes (Aleksandr Volkov)	Yes (Kosmos 2175)	Yes (Kosmos 2175)	Yes (Soyuz TM-14)
Rwanda	Rwanda Space Agency	RSA	2021	No	Yes (RWASAT-1)	Yes (RWASAT-1)	No
Saudi Arabia	Saudi Space Agency	SSA	1977 (KACST-SRI); 2018 (SSC/SSA)	Yes (Sultan Bin Salman)	Yes (Arabsat-1A)	Yes (SaudiSat-4)	No
Singapore	National Space Agency of Singapore	NSAS	1 Apr 2026	No	No	No	No
South Africa	South African National Space Agency	SANSA	9 Dec 2010	Yes (Mark Shuttleworth)	Yes (SUNSAT)	Yes (SUNSAT)	No
Soviet Union †	Soviet space program	СССР; Космическая программа	1955 disbanded 25 Dec 1991	Yes (Yuri Gagarin)	Yes (Sputnik 1)	Yes (Sputnik 1)	Yes (Korabl-Sputnik 2)
Spain	Agencia Espacial Española	AEE	2023	Yes (Pedro Duque)	Yes (Hispasat 1A)	Yes (Intasat)	No
Sweden	Swedish National Space Agency	SNSA	1972	Yes (Christer Fuglesang)	Yes (Viking)	Yes	No
Switzerland	Swiss Space Office	SSO	1998	Claude Nicollier	Yes (SwissCube-1)	Yes (SwissCube-1)	No
Syria	Syrian Space Agency	SSA	18 Mar 2014	Yes (Muhammed Faris)	No	No	No
Taiwan	Taiwan Space Agency	TASA	3 Oct 1991	No	Yes (ST-1)	Yes (Formosat-1)	No
Thailand	Geo-Informatics and Space Technology Development Agency	GISTDA สทอภ	3 Nov 2000	No	Yes (Thaicom 1)	Yes (KNACKSAT)	No
Tunisia	French: Centre national de la cartographie et de la télédétection (Arabic: المركز الوطني للإستشعار عن بعد) (National Remote Sensing Center of Tunisia)	CNCT	1988	No	Yes (Challenge-1)	Yes (Challenge-1)	No
Turkey	Turkish Space Agency (Türkiye Uzay Ajansı)	TUA	1985 (TÜBİTAK UZAY); 13 Dec 2018 (TUA)	Yes (Alper Gezeravcı)	Yes (Türksat 1A)	Yes (Göktürk-2)	No
Turkmenistan	Turkmenistan National Space Agency	TNSA	2011	Yes (Oleg Kononenko)	Yes (TürkmenÄlem52E / MonacoSAT)	No	No
Ukraine	State Space Agency of Ukraine	SSAU	2 Mar 1992	Yes (Leonid Kadenyuk)	Yes	Yes (Sich-1)	No
United Arab Emirates	United Arab Emirates Space Agency	UAESA	2014	Yes (Hazza Al Mansouri)	Yes (Thuraya 2)	Yes (KhalifaSat)	No
United Kingdom	UK Space Agency	UKSA	1 Apr 2010	Yes (Helen Sharman)	Yes (Ariel 1)	Yes (Prospero)	No
United Nations	United Nations Committee on the Peaceful Uses of Outer Space	UNCOPUOS	12 Dec 1959	—	—	—	—
United Nations	United Nations Office for Outer Space Affairs	UNOOSA	13 Dec 1958	—	—	—	—
United States	National Aeronautics and Space Administration	NASA	29 Jul 1958	Yes (Alan Shepard)	Yes (Explorer 1)	Yes (Explorer 1)	Yes (Discoverer 13)
Uzbekistan	The Space Research and Technology Agency under the Ministry of Digital Technologies of the Republic of Uzbekistan	Uzcosmos	30 Aug 2019	No	Yes (Samarkand 2028)	No	No
Venezuela	Bolivarian Agency for Space Activities	ABAE	1 Jan 2008	No	Yes (Venesat-1)	No	No
Vietnam	Vietnam National Space Center	TTVTVN or VNSC; VAST-VNSC	20 Nov 2006	Yes (Phạm Tuân)	Yes (Vinasat-1)	Yes (F-1)	No
Subnational Space Agencies
Country	Subdivision	Name	Founded	First space traveler	Operates satellites	Builds satellites	Recoverable payloads capable
United States	California	California Space Authority	1996 (CSTA) 2001 (CSA) disbanded 10 Jun 2011	No	No	No	No
United States	Florida	Space Florida	1989 (FSA) 1 Sep 2006 (Space Florida)	Yes	No	Yes	No
United States	New Mexico	New Mexico Spaceport Authority	Feb 2011	Yes	No	No	No
United States	Oklahoma	Oklahoma Space Industry Development Authority	2006	No	No	No	No
United States	Virginia	Virginia Spaceport Authority	1 Jul 1996	Yes	No	Yes	No
India	Kerala	K-Space Trivandrum	1 Jul 2019	No	No	No	No

== Launch capability ==
This group of agencies have developed or are developing launch infrastructure including space launch sites, suborbital launch technology, orbital launch systems, cryogenic rocket technologies and reusable hardware technologies.

Overview of space agency launch capabilities
Agency	Demonstrated capability				
Agency	Operates launch site	Suborbital launch capable	Orbital launch capable	Cryogenic rocket engine use	Reusable systems use
(Argentina) CONAE	Yes (Punta Indio)	Yes (Orión)	No	No	No
(Australia) ASA	Yes (Woomera)	Yes (Long Tom)	No	No	No
(Brazil) AEB	Yes (Alcântara)	Yes (VSB-30)	No	Yes (L-75)	No
(Canada) CSA	Yes	Yes	No	No	No
(China) CNSA	Yes (Jiuquan)	Yes	Yes (Long March 1)	Yes (YF-73)	No
Austria; Belgium; Czech Republic; Denmark; Estonia; Finland; France; Germany; Greece; Hungary; Ireland; Italy; Luxembourg; Netherlands; Norway; Portugal; Poland; Romania; Spain; Sweden; Switzerland; United Kingdom ESA	Yes (Kourou)	Yes	Yes (Ariane 1)	Yes	No
(France) CNES	Yes (Kourou)	Yes (Véronique)	Yes (Diamant A)	Yes	No
(India) ISRO	Yes (Sriharikota)	Yes (RH-75)	Yes (SLV)	Yes (CE-20) (CE-7.5)	No
(Iran) Iranian Space Agency	Yes (Semnan)	Yes (Safir)	Yes (Safir)	Yes (Bahman engine)	No
Israel Space Agency	Yes (Palmachim Airbase)	Yes (Shavit 2)	Yes (Shavit 2)	No	No
(Italy) ASI	Yes (Salto di Quirra)	Yes	No	Yes	No
(Japan) JAXA	Yes (Uchinoura)	Yes	Yes (Lambda-4S)	Yes (LE-7)	No
(North Korea) NATA	Yes (Sohae)	Yes	Yes (Unha-3)	Yes (27 May 2024)	No
(South Korea) KARI	Yes (Naro)	Yes	Yes (Nuri)	No	No
(Mexico) MSA	No	Yes	No	No	No
(New Zealand) NZSA	No	No	No	No	No
(Pakistan) SUPARCO	Yes (Sonmiani Flight Test Range)	Yes (Rehbar-I)	No	No	No
(Poland) POLSA	Yes	Yes	No	No	No
(Russia) Roscosmos	Yes (Plesetsk)	Yes	Yes (Soyuz-U)	Yes	No
(Soviet Union) Soviet space program †	Yes (Baikonur)	Yes (GIRD-09)	Yes (R-7 Sputnik)	Yes (KVD-1)	No
(Sweden) SNSA	Yes (Esrange)	Yes (Maser)	No	No	No
(Ukraine) SSAU	No	Yes	Yes (Dnepr)	No	No
(United Kingdom) UKSA	Yes	Yes	Yes	No	No
(United States) NASA	Yes (Cape Canaveral)	Yes (WAC Corporal)	Yes (Juno I)	Yes (RL10)	Yes (Space Shuttle)

== Extraterrestrial exploration capability ==
This group of agencies have developed advanced technological capabilities required for travel and study of other heavenly bodies within the Solar System. These involve the capacity to leave the local area around the planet Earth for lunar and/or missions to other bodies in the Solar System.

Overview of space agencies extraterrestrial exploration capability
Space agency	Demonstrated capability					
Space agency	Operates flyby spacecraft	Operates extraterrestrial orbiter	Controlled surface impact	Uncrewed soft landing	Uncrewed rover operation	Sample return
(China) CNSA	Yes (Chang'e 5-T1)	Yes (Chang'e 1)	Yes (Chang'e 1)	Yes (Chang'e 3)	Yes (Yutu-1)	Yes (Chang'e 5)
ESA	Yes (Ulysses)	Yes (Mars Express)	Yes (Rosetta)	Yes (Huygens)	No	No
(India) ISRO	Yes (Chandrayaan-3)	Yes (Chandrayaan-1)	Yes (Moon Impact Probe)	Yes (Chandrayaan-3)	Yes (Pragyan)	No
(Japan) JAXA	Yes (Hiten)	Yes (Hiten)	Yes (Hiten)	Yes (Hayabusa)	Yes (MINERVA-II)	Yes (Hayabusa)
(Soviet Union) Soviet space program †	Yes (Luna 1)	Yes (Luna 10)	Yes (Luna 2)	Yes (Luna 9)	Yes (Lunokhod 1)	Yes (Luna 16)
(United States) NASA	Yes (Pioneer 4)	Yes (Lunar Orbiter 1)	Yes (Ranger 7)	Yes (Surveyor 1)	Yes (Sojourner)	Yes (Apollo 11)
(Russia) Roscosmos	No	Yes (ExoMars Trace Gas Orbiter)	Yes (Luna 25)	No	No	No

=== Without launch capabilities ===
This category is formed by agencies that operate and construct satellites in extraterrestrial environments, but do not have the capability to transport those satellites to the desired orbit/trajectory/landing spot. As of May 2024, five space agencies have achieved the requirements to be listed here: (Note: Failed projects like "Colmena" of the MSA/AEM (Mexican Space Agency/Agencia Espacial Mejicana) are not included in this list.; ISA (Israel Space Agency) does have launch vehicles (Shavit 2) but not powerful enough to reach further than Earth orbit.; This list does not include the previous space agencies.)

Overview of space agencies extraterrestrial satellite operation and constructing capabilities
Space agency	Demonstrated capability				
Space agency	Operates extraterrestrial orbiter	Controlled surface impact	Uncrewed soft landing	Uncrewed rover operation	Sample return
(Luxembourg) LuxSpace	Yes (Manfred Memorial Moon Mission, flyby only)	No	No	No	No
(Italy) ASI	Yes (ArgoMoon)	No	No	No	No
(South Korea) KARI	Yes (Danuri)	No	No	No	No
(United Arab Emirates) UAESA	Yes (Emirates Mars Mission)	No	No	No	No
(Pakistan) SUPARCO	Yes (ICUBE-Q)	No	No	No	No

== Human spaceflight capability ==
The space agencies listed here have demonstrated the greatest technological capacity for human spaceflight, along with the supporting capabilities needed to sustain human activity in orbit or on extraterrestrial bodies. Each missions listed, and the personnel named where relevant, represent the first successful instance of that activity.

Overview of space agencies human spaceflight capability
Space agency	Demonstrated capability					
Space agency	Crewed space launch	EVA	Rendezvous and docking	Space station	Crewed circumlunar flight	Crewed Moon landing
(China) CNSA	Yes (Shenzhou 5)	Yes (Shenzhou 7)	Yes (Shenzhou 8 to Tiangong-1)	Yes (Tiangong-1)	No	No
(India) ISRO	No	No	Yes (SDX01 to SDX02 — as part of SpaDeX)	No	No	No
(Russia) Roscosmos	Yes (Soyuz TM-14)	Yes (Mir, Aleksandr Volkov and Sergei Krikalev)	Yes (Soyuz TM-14 to Mir)	Yes (Mir)	No	No
(Soviet Union) Soviet space program †	Yes (Vostok 1)	Yes (Voskhod 2, Alexei Leonov)	Yes (Soyuz 4 to Soyuz 5)	Yes (Salyut 1)	No	No
(United States) NASA	Yes (Mercury-Redstone 3)	Yes (Gemini 4, Ed White)	Yes (Gemini 8 to GATV)	Yes (Skylab)	Yes (Apollo 8)	Yes (Apollo 11)

== Proposed agencies ==
- (Albania) Albanian Space Office (ASO), proposed in 2020, at progress stage.
- (Armenia) Armenian Space Agency (ArmCosmos), proposed in 2013 with the goal to launch satellites, currently negotiating with the International Telecommunication Union to clear the path for its prospective launch.
- Bhutan Space Office (BSO), proposed in 2016, at progress stage.
- Botswana Aeronautics and Space Agency (BotswanaSpace), proposed in 2020, at progress stage.
- (Cambodia) Cambodian Aeronautics and Space Office (CASO), proposed in 2016, at progress stage.
- (Croatia) Croatian Space Agency (CROSA), proposed in 2020, currently operates as NGO Adriatic Aerospace Association (A3), at progress stage.
- Djibouti National Space Office (DNSO), announced in 2022, at bill stage.
- Guatemala Space Agency, proposed in 2019, at progress stage.
- Honduras Space Agency (AEH), proposed in 2018, at progress stage.
- (Iraq) Iraqi National Aeronautics and Space Office (INASO), proposed in 2019, at progress stage.
- (Laos) Lao Aeronautics and Space Agency (LaoSpace), proposed in 2015, at progress stage.
- Latvia Space Office (LSO), proposed in 2020, at progress stage.
- Malta Space Office (MSO), proposed in 2022, at progress stage.
- Moldova National Space Office, proposed in 2018, at progress stage.
- Monaco Space Agency, proposed in 2020, at progress stage.
- (Montenegro) Montenegrin National Bureau of Space, announced in 2022, bill stage.
- Myanmar Aeronautics and Space Agency (MASA), proposed in 2019, at progress stage.
- Nepal Aeronautics and Space Office (NepalSpace), proposed in 2018, at progress stage.
- (Nicaragua) Nicaraguan Space Agency (AEN), announced in 2021, bill stage.
- Oman Space Agency (OSA), proposed in 2020, at progress stage.
- Palestine Space Agency (PSA), proposed in 2010, at progress stage.
- Panama Space Agency (AEP), proposed in 2014, at progress stage.
- (Serbia) Serbian Space Office (SerbSpace), proposed in 2016, at progress stage.
- (Slovenia) Slovenian National Bureau of Space, proposed in 2019, at progress stage.
- Sri Lanka Aeronautics and Space Agency (SLASA), proposed in 2009. Immediate goal was to construct and launch two satellites. Sri Lankan Telecommunications Regulatory Commission had signed an agreement with Surrey Satellite Technology Ltd to get the relevant help and resources.
- Sudan Space Agency, proposed in 2017, at progress stage.
- (Tanzania) Tanzanian National Space Agency (TNSA), proposed in 2021, at progress stage.
- (Uruguay) Uruguayan Space Agency (AEU), Announced in 2021, bill stage.

== Budgets ==
The annual budgets listed are the official budgets of national space agencies available in public domain. For European contributors to ESA, the national budgets shown include also their contributions to ESA.

Budgets of space agencies
Agency	Budget (US$ millions)	Year	Reference
(United States) NASA	25,400	2025	
(China) CNSA	18,150	2023	
Austria; Belgium; Czech Republic; Denmark; European Union; Finland; France; Germany; Greece; Ireland; Italy; Luxembourg; Netherlands; Norway; Poland; Portugal; Romania; Spain; Sweden; Switzerland; United Kingdom ESA	9,080	2025	
(France) CNES	3,521	2022	
(Japan) JAXA	2,388	2022	
(Russia) Roscosmos	1,950	2025	
(India) ISRO	1,831	2022	
(Italy) ASI	1,685	2024	
(Germany) GAC	1,424	2021	
(Greece) HSC	1	2023	
(Spain) AEE	739	2023	
(South Korea) KASA	726	2025	
(United Kingdom) UKSA	604	2021	
(Canada) CSA	460	2019	
(Algeria) ASA	394	2020	
(Belgium) ISAB	260	2020	
(Poland) PSA	243	2025	
(Iran) ISA, ISRC and ARI	222	2024	
(Switzerland) SSO	177	2019	
(Netherlands) NLSA	150	2022	
(Sweden) SNSA	120	2022	
(Ukraine) SSAU	107	2022	
(Norway) NSA	103	2019	
(Turkey) TSA	496	2027	
(Austria) ASA	75	2020	
(Brazil) BSA	68	2022	
(Argentina) CONAE	63	2022	
(Indonesia) NIAS	54	2022	
(Pakistan) SUPARCO	50	2019	
(Philippines) PhilSA	38	2019	
(Nigeria) NSRDA	36	2020	
(Australia) ASA	35	2020	
(Israel) ISA	17	2020	
(South Africa) SANSA	15	2020	
(Portugal) AEP	9	2023	
(Mexico) MASA	4	2022	
ESSTI	3	2022	[192]
(Chile) CSA	1	2014	
World	~62,000		

== See also ==
- List of private spaceflight companies
- Committee on Earth Observation Satellites
- Lists of astronomical objects
- SEDS
- Lists of spacecraft
- Lists of astronauts
- Lists of space scientists
