= Mirjana Pović =

Astrophysicist

- Born: 8 August 1981 (age 45); Pančevo
- Education: University of Belgrade; Durham University; University of La Laguna
- Scientific career
- Workplaces: University of KwaZulu-Natal; Instituto de Astrofísica de Andalucía; Ethiopian Space Science and Technology Institute
- Thesis: Estudio de la población de núcleos activos de galaxias en cartografiados profundos (2010)

Mirjana Pović (born 8 August 1981) is a Serbian astrophysicist who works on galaxy formation and evolution at the Ethiopian Space Science and Technology Institute. She was the inaugural laureate of the Nature - Estée Lauder Inspiring Science Award.

== Early life and education ==
Pović was born in Pančevo, Serbia. She was only nine years old when the war in Serbia began. She became interested in astronomy as a child, and hitchhiked to attend her classes. She studied physics at the University of Belgrade, where she was awarded a full scholarship and earned her degree in 2005. She was awarded a summer scholarship to study astrophysics at Durham University in 2004. She earned her doctoral degree at the University of La Laguna, working with the Instituto de Astrofísica de Canarias (IAC). For her doctorate she used the XMM-Newton and Chandra X-ray Observatories. Pović defended her thesis on active galactic nuclei in 2010. During her PhD she volunteered in Tanzania and Kenya, and became "amazed by Africa's beauty and diversity". She was a postdoctoral fellow at the University of KwaZulu-Natal in 2010, before returning to the Instituto de Astrofísica de Andalucía in 2011. She became involved with the African Network for Astronomy School Education in 2012. She began to volunteer with the Granada Association for Human Rights of Andalusia in 2012, specialising in prostitution and immigration.

== Research and career ==
Pović works on the formation and evolution of galaxies. To study these galaxies, Pović uses planetary surveys such as the Advanced Large Homogeneous Area Medium-Band Redshift Astronomical (ALHAMBRA). She investigates the star formation rate and mass-metallicity. She is an affiliated researcher at the Instituto de Astrofísica de Andalucía. Pović joined the Association of Women Researchers and Technologists in 2013.

In 2016 Pović joined the Entoto Observatory and Research Centre in Ethiopia. She believes that astronomy and space science will be important for Africa to achieve the Sustainable Development Goals. She has been involved with the Ethiopian Space Science and Technology Institute (ESSTI) since it was established. She is a Professor of Physics and Head of the Department of Astronomy. She was responsible for training the first generation of postgraduate astronomy students in astronomy, including Ethiopia, Tanzania, Rwanda and Uganda. There are over 100 members of staff, but only 5 with doctorates. She is the only woman and only European member of the team.

That year she began to coordinate the African countries program of the Network for Astronomy School Education in 2016. She has taught physics across Africa, including in to orphans in Rwanda and HIV-positive people in Tanzania. She believes that scientists should spend more time connecting to the developing world. She leads science clubs and lecture series for secondary-school girls in Ethiopia.

Pović was awarded the 2019 Nature Research - Estée Lauder Inspiring Science Award. She has said she will use the €10,000 award money to build networks between women scientists in Ethiopia. She is a member of the International Astronomical Union.
