= Libyan Center for Remote Sensing and Space Science =

Libyan space agency

Libyan Center for Remote Sensing and Space Science - LCRSSS
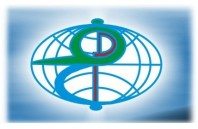

Agency overview
- Abbreviation: LCRSSS
- Formed: 1989
- Type: Space agency
- Headquarters: Tripoli, Libya
- Official languages: Arabic, de facto English, French
- Administrator: Dr. Akram Al-Kasih
- Owner: Government
- Annual budget: ($7) mn (2008)

The Libyan Center for Remote Sensing and Space Science also known as LCRSSS, established in 1989, is a governmental research organization dedicated to the researches in remote sensing, space, and earthquake sciences, currently with more than 5 research stations. Headquartered in Tripoli, LCRSSS has a staff of close to 300 with an annual budget of about €7 million in 2008.
