= UBAKUSAT =

Turkish nanosatellite launched from the International Space Station in May 2018

Ubakusat
- Mission type: Technology demonstration Earth observation
- Operator: Istanbul Technical University
- COSPAR ID: 1998-067NQ
- SATCAT no.: 43467

Spacecraft properties
- Spacecraft type: 3U CubeSat
- Manufacturer: ITU Space Systems Design And Testing Laboratory
- Launch mass: 3 kg (6.6 lb)
- Dimensions: 10 cm (4 in) cubed

Start of mission
- Launch date: 2 April 2018 UTC
- Rocket: Falcon 9 FT, CRS-14
- Launch site: Kennedy LC-39A
- Contractor: SpaceX
- Entered service: 11 May 2018, 08:51 UTC

End of mission
- Decay date: 27 December 2020

Orbital parameters
- Reference system: Geocentric
- Regime: Low Earth
- Semi-major axis: 6,778.8 km (4,212.2 mi)
- Eccentricity: 0.0001299
- Inclination: 51.64
- Period: 92.61

UBAKUSAT was a Turkish nanosatellite that was developed by Istanbul Technical University. It was launched into space on board a Falcon-9 rocket in April 2018 and was deployed into its orbit from the International Space Station in May 2018. It was built as a technology demonstration and Earth observation satellite to provide voice communications for amateur radio stations around the world. It carried an experimental card, TAMSAT Simplesat, which allowed scientists to test its accuracy of measuring radiation from space. It was the fifth satellite to be built by students of Istanbul Technical University.

== Development ==
The contractual agreement covering the development and launching UBAKUSAT was signed between the Japanese government and the Istanbul Technical University on 8 September 2016, in Ankara. UBAKUSAT is a nanosatellite built by students of Istanbul Technical University's Faculty of Aeronautics and Astronautics, Space Systems Design and Test Lab (SSDTL). Technical support was provided by Turkey's Ministries of Transportation, Communication and Maritime in collaboration with the Japan Aerospace and Exploration Agency (JAXA) and Kyushu Institute of Technology. The satellite has an amateur radio and a linear transponder. UBAKUSAT's linear transponder is similar to the TURKSAT-3USAT satellite which was launched on 26 April 2013. UBAKUSAT is the fifth satellite to have been built by students of SSDTL. The first was ITUpSAT1 which was launched into low Earth orbit about 720 kilometres (450 mi) above Earth, on 23 September 2009 by a Polar Satellite Launch Vehicle rocket.

On February 23, 2018, UBAKUSAT was delivered to JAXA officials at Tsukuba Space Center in Ibaraki. The satellite then underwent several tests at the space centre to simulate conditions that will be faced in space.

== Launch ==
On 2 April 2018, the satellite was carried on the International Space Station (ISS) on board a Falcon-9 rocket with help from the National Aeronautic and Space Administration (NASA). It was deployed from the space station into its orbit from the KIBO module on 11 May 2018. Its launch coincided with that of the 1KUNS-PF from Kenya and Irazú from Costa Rica. All three CubeSats carry amateur radio payloads with Irazú and 1KUNS-PF have telemetry beacons while UBAKUSAT carries a linear transponder for amateur radio. All three satellites were deployed into space from the Kibo module of the ISS by Japanese astronaut Norishige Kanai. UBAKUSAT was expected to orbit the Earth for a duration of between six and twelve months before de-orbiting.

== Purpose ==
UBAKUSAT was launched into space with the aim of providing voice communications for amateur radio stations around the world. The satellite had an experimental TAMSAT Simplesat card onboard which relayed data about space radiation to ground stations. The card was used in an experiment to assess its space radiation measuring technology.
