= K-space =

K-space or k-space can refer to:

- Another name for the spatial frequency domain of a spatial Fourier transform
  - Reciprocal space, containing the reciprocal lattice of a spatial lattice
  - Momentum space, or wavevector space, the vector space of possible values of momentum for a particle
  - k-space (magnetic resonance imaging)
- Another name for a compactly generated space in topology
- K-space (functional analysis) is an F-space such that every twisted sum by the real line splits
- K-Space (band), a British-Siberian music ensemble
- K-Space Trivandrum an Indian space technology industrial park
