= National Polytechnical Museum =

Coordinates: 42.7041°N 23.3120°E

- Национален политехнически музей
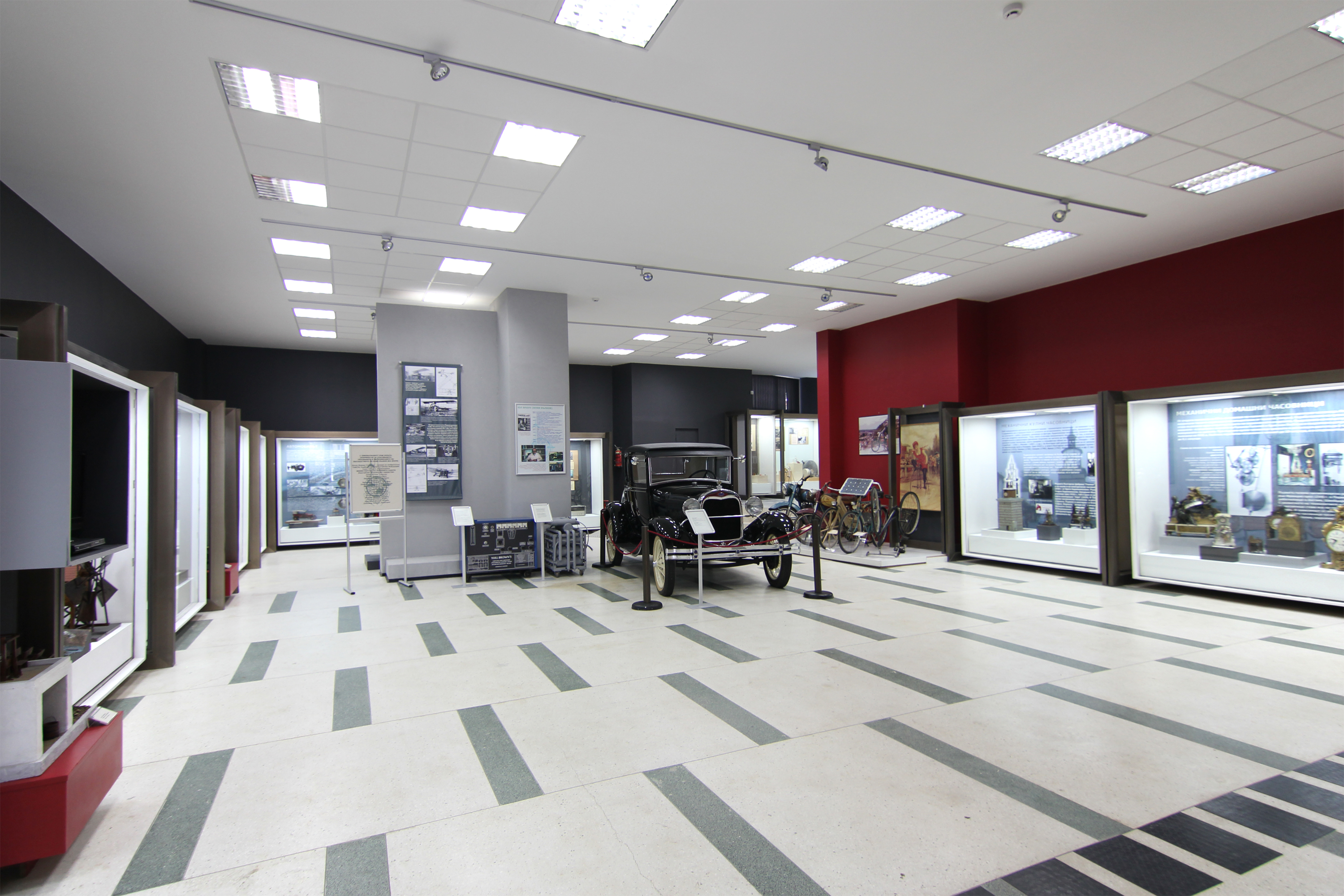
- Interior of the museum
- Established: 1957
- Location: ul. Opalchenska 66, Sofia, Bulgaria
- Type: Science museum
- Collection size: 22,000 (1,000 displayed)
- Visitors: 30,000
- Director: Ekaterina Tsekova
- Curator: Lyuba Dashovska
- Owner: Ministry of Culture
- Website: polytechnic-museum.com

The National Polytechnical Museum (Bulgarian: Национален политехнически музей) is a science museum located in Sofia, Bulgaria.

== History ==
The National Polytechnical Museum was established on 13 May 1957 by a Council of Ministers decree, initially under the Bulgarian Academy of Sciences. It was declared a national museum in 1968.

Since 1992, the museum is located in a building formerly used as a museum to Georgi Dimitrov. It has been completely renovated in 2012 at a cost of 640,000 lv (326,000 euro). The National Polytechnical Museum regularly participates in the annual Night of Museums.

== Collections ==
The museum has a collection of more than 22,000 items, but only 1,000 of them are permanently displayed. Collections are supplemented by a library with more than 12,000 books and journals, and an archive of about 2,000 documents. Permanent collections are divided in exhibitions of time measurement, transportation, photography and cinema, optics, audio equipment, radio and television, computing equipment, communications equipment and others.

Some of the items on display include:

- Ford Model A (1928), Fiat 509, Tatra 97 and Messerschmitt KR200 in the automotive collection;
- Creed & Company transmitters, radio and television equipment by Telefunken, Blaupunkt and others;
- Quipus, early abaci and early electronic calculators, including Bulgarian-manufactured Elka 22 (1965) and Pravetz computers (1980s);
- Instruments for space satellites and space food;
- Player piano, the only Bulgarian-manufactured Hammond organ, barrel organs and others.
Items
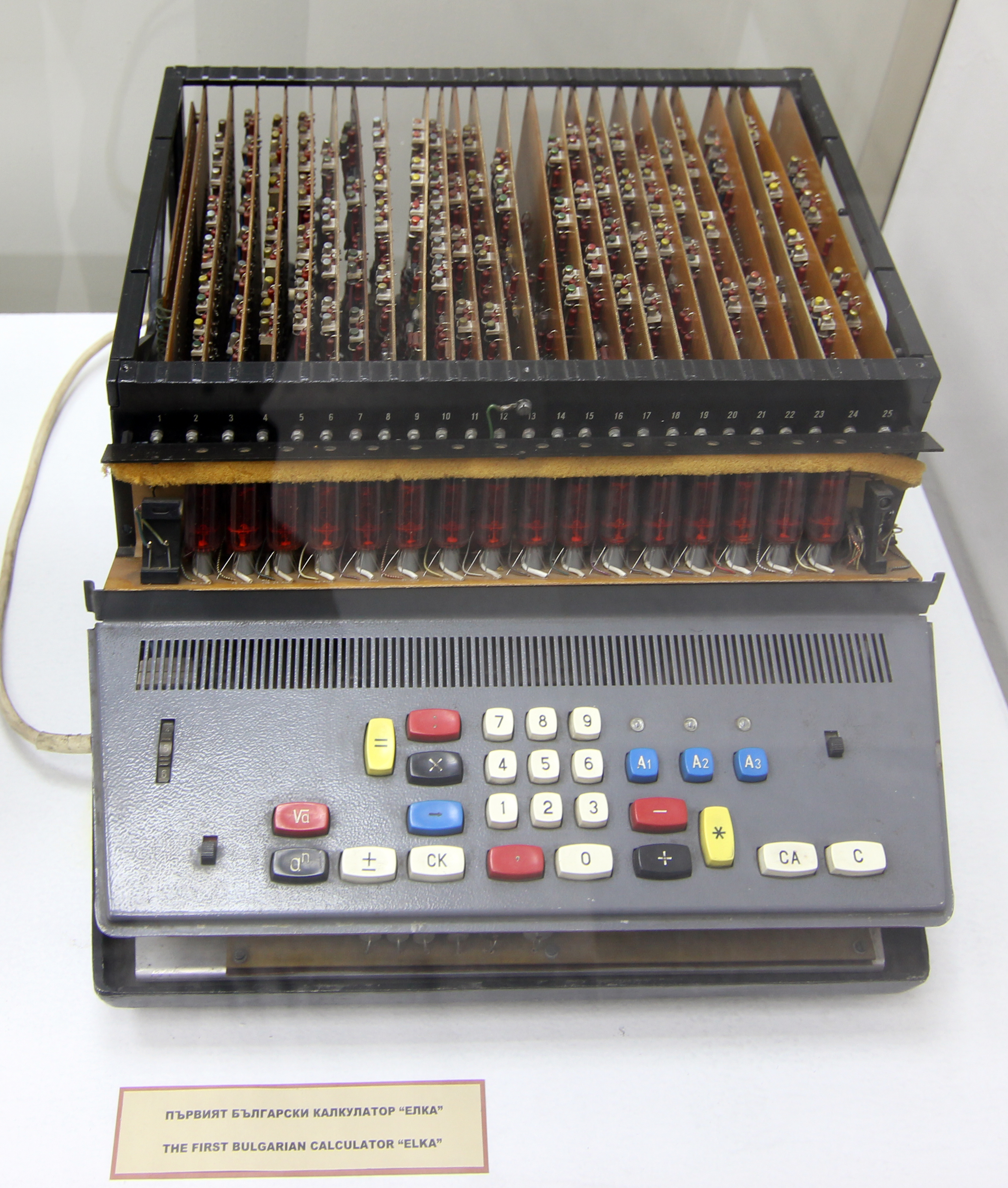
Elka 6521 calculator, 1965

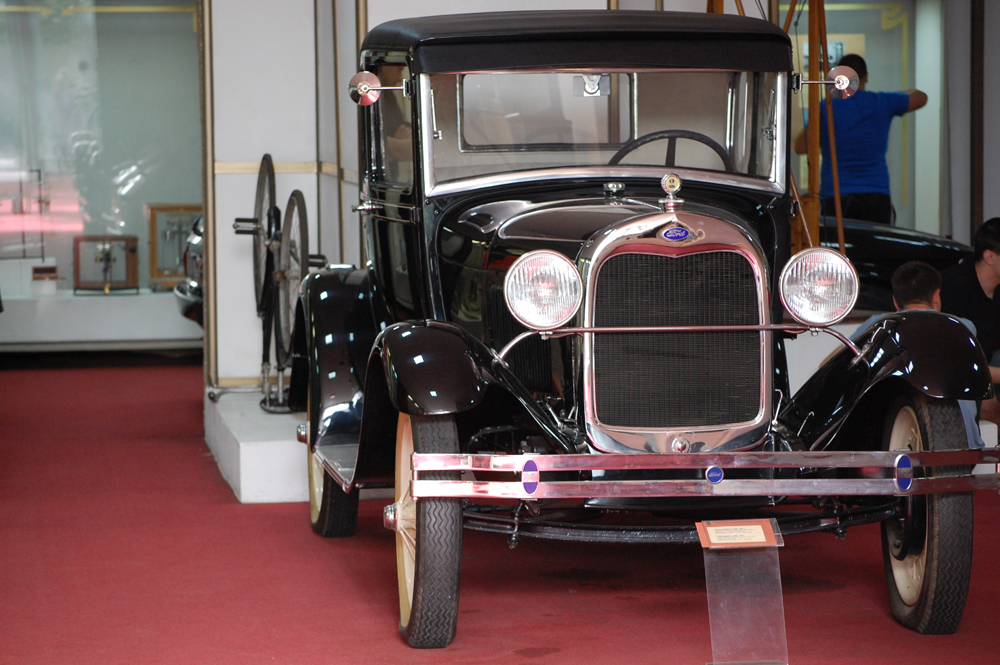
Ford Model A, 1928

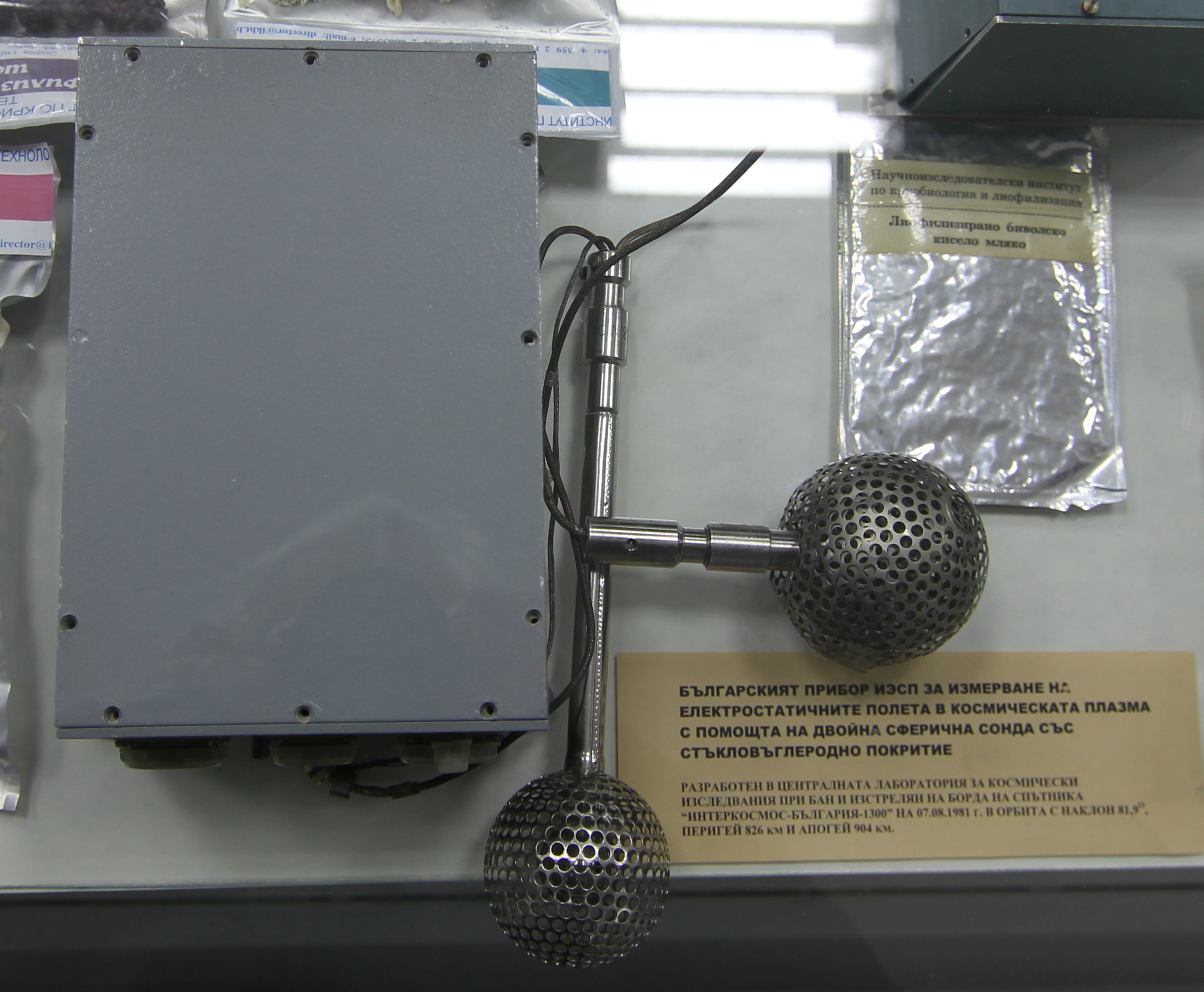
Spherical Electrostatic Ion Trap, Bulgaria 1300 satellite, 1980

== Accessibility ==
The museum is located on ul. Opalchenska 66. It is open from Monday to Saturday from 9 to 17 o'clock. Fees range from 1 to 7 leva; fees for laboratory demonstrations are 10 or 15 leva (for groups of more than 10 people).

Service	Station/Stop	Lines/Routes served	Distance from NPM
Sofia Trolleybus Service	bul. Kiril i Metodiy	1, 5	50 m
Sofia Bus Service	bul. Kiril i Metodiy	74	50 m
Sofia Metro	Opalchenska	1	450 m

== Branches ==
The National Polytechnical Museum has three branches outside Sofia. One of them is the hydroelectric power station in Pancharevo, the first power producing unit in Southeastern Europe. It became operational on 1 November 1900 and powered the tram system of Sofia, street lamps and several industries. The station was declared a site of cultural significance in 1986, shortly after it ceased operations. The two other branches are a textile museum in Sliven, which traces the history of textile crafts, fabrics and techniques in Bulgaria through the centuries, and a Palace of physics in Kazanlak.

== See also ==
- National Transport Museum, Bulgaria, with a larger collection of vehicles
- 2018 Podcast Interview with National Polytechnical Museum curator Vassil Macaranov
