= Space Research and Technology Institute =

Bulgarian space agency

Space Research and Technology Institute Институт за космически изследвания и технологии

Agency overview
- Abbreviation: SRTI-BAS (ИКИТ-БАН)
- Formed: 1987
- Type: Space agency
- Headquarters: Sofia, Bulgaria
- Owner: Bulgaria
- Website: www.space.bas.bg

The Space Research and Technology Institute (Bulgarian: Институт за космически изследвания и технологии, romanized: Institut za kosmicheski izsledvaniya i tekhnologii) of the Bulgarian Academy of Sciences is a primary research body in the field of space science in Bulgaria.

The mission of SRTI-BAS is to conduct fundamental and applied studies in the field of Space Physics, Remote Sensing of the Earth and Planets, and Aerospace Systems and Technologies.

== Scope ==
The field of activity of SRTI ranges over fundamental and applied investigations in space physics, astrophysics, image processing, remote sensing, life sciences, scientific equipment, preparation and implementation of experiments in the area of space exploration and usage from the board of automatic and piloted spacecraft, investigation on control systems, air- and spacecraft and equipment for them, activity for creation of cosmic materials and technologies and their transfer in the national economy, education of post-graduate students and master's degrees.

== History ==
The organized participation of Bulgarian scientists in space research started in 1969 with the creation of a Scientific Group of Space Physics (SGSP) at the Presidium of the Bulgarian Academy of Sciences. In 1974, based on the SGSP, the Central Laboratory for Space Research (CLSR) was founded. The Space Research Institute (SRI) at the Bulgarian Academy of Sciences succeeded the Central Laboratory for Space Research in 1987. Under the reform carried out at the Bulgarian Academy of Sciences, by a Resolution of the General Assembly of the BAS of 23 March 2010, the SRI and the Solar-Terrestrial Influences Institute (STII) merged to form a new unit – the Space and Solar-Terrestrial Research Institute at the BAS (SSTRI–BAS) renamed in 2012 to Space Research and Technology Institute (SRTI).

Bulgarian scientists from SRTI-BAS successfully participated in the Intercosmos program, preparing experiments and designing equipment for several satellites and rockets.

In 1979, the first Bulgarian cosmonaut Georgi Ivanov flew in space on board of Soyuz 33.

In 1981 two satellites were launched - Bulgaria 1300 and Meteor-Priroda 2-4 (Meteor 1-31), furnished entirely with Bulgarian equipment, aimed at studying the ionospheric-magnetospheric relationship and remote sensing of the Earth from space.

In 1984 teams from SRTI-BAS took part in the international projects "Vega 1 and 2" (1984) – for realization of the project "Venus-Halley's Comet".

In 1988 the second Bulgarian cosmonaut Alexandar Alexsandrov flew on board Soyuz TM-5 to the Mir space station. "Active" (1989) – for determination of the electrostatic field around a satellite, the development of apparatus "VSK- FREGAT" (1989) – which transmit images of the Phobos satellite of Mars, within the "Phobos" Program. In the institute was created the space greenhouse "SVET", with which successful experiments were carried out by Russian and American astronauts, including the cultivation of plants from "seed to seed" of the Space Station (SS) "MIR".

Until 2001 on board of the "MIR" SS worked and the system for complex physiological study of astronauts "NEVROLAB-B" and "R-400" radiometer to obtain data on the parameters of the Earth's surface.

In the recent years the institute is actively included in competitions on the 6th, 7th, and Horizon 2020 framework programmes of the EU, PHARE programme, NATO, etc.

== Publishing activity ==
Since 2004 SRTI-BAS is organizing an annual conference "Space, Ecology, Safety" which proceedings (ISSN ) can be found on the SRTI-BAS website. Few more workshops and conferences were organized by STIL-BAS before the reform in 2010. Their proceedings can also be found in the 'Publishing activity' section of SRTI-BAS website.

The Aerospace Research in Bulgaria journal was founded in 1978 under the name Space Research in Bulgaria. Its founder and first editor was Acad. Kiril Serafimov (1978–1990). Over the years, editors were Prof. Boris Bonev (1991–1996), Prof. Nikola Georgiev (1996–2006), and Prof. Garo Mardirossian (2006–until now). The Journal has been changing its name two times. Firstly, it was issued under Space Research in Bulgaria (ISSN 0204-9104, No. 1–8), from No. 9 to No. 15 its name was changed to “Аерокосмически изследвания в България” (ISSN 0861-1432) continuing the policy from the first issues to publish in Bulgarian, Russian, and English. Since 2001, the journal name was changed to Aerospace Research in Bulgaria (No. 16-, ISSN 1313-0927, eISSN 2367-9522) and its content is entirely in English, with summaries in Bulgarian or Russian.

== See also ==
- List of government space agencies
