= Network for Astronomy School Education =

International Astronomical Union

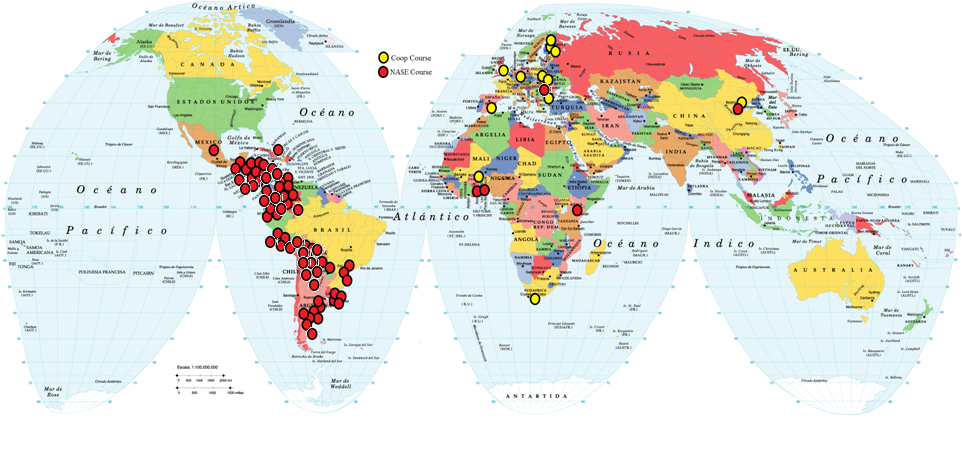
- Abbreviation: NASE
- Formation: 2009
- President: Rosa Maria Ros
- Vice-President: Beatriz Garcia
- Website: www.iau.org/science/scientific_bodies/working_groups/259/

Network for Astronomy School Education (NASE) is an International Astronomical Union (IAU) Working Group that works on Training Teachers for primary and secondary schools. In 2007, professor George K. Miley, IAU vice-president, invited Rosa M. Ros to begin exploring the idea of setting up an astronomy program to give primary and secondary school teachers a better preparation in this area of knowledge. The birth of NASE Group occurred when Rosa Maria Ros and Alexandre Costa were sent by UNESCO and IAU to give two courses in Peru and Ecuador in July 2009. Shortly after NASE was officially created in August 2009 during IAU's General Assembly at Rio de Janeiro. From there on more than 80 courses have been presented worldwide.

The topics of "the basic NASE course" are:

- Positional astronomy
- Solar System
- Exoplanets
- Spectrography
- Photometry
- Spectroscopy
- Determination of absolute magnitude
- Stellar nucleosynthesis
- Stellar evolution
- Cosmology

NASE classes were designed for developing countries where teachers don't have many financial resources. NASE Working Group members go to these countries for the first time to prepare a local task group that will disseminate astronomy knowledge and inexpensive didactic materials. The main goal is precisely to set up in each country a local group of NASE members who carry on teaching the essential NASE course every year and to create new didactic inexpensive experiments, demonstrations and astronomical instruments. This has allowed to build a very large repository of educational materials for astronomy with PowerPoint Presentations], animations, articles and lectures, photos, games, simulations websites, interactive programs(e.g. Stellarium) and videos.

== NASE Courses ==
NASE has now given more than seventy courses mainly in South America, Africa and Asia.

Meeting	Venue	Dates
1	Lima (Peru)	17–20 July 2009
2	Salinas (Ecuador)	18–21 July 2009
3	Barranquilla (Colombia)	6–9 July 2010
4	Managua (Nicaragua)	12–15 July 2010
5	Lima (Peru)	17–20 July 2010
6	Rosario (Argentina)	12–15 October 2010
7	Cañada de Gómez (Argentina)	13–15 October 2010
8	Venado Tuerto (Argentina)	26–28 May 2011
9	Rafaela (Argentina)	22–25 June 2011
10	Tegucigalpa (Honduras)	11–14 July 2011
11	Managua (Nicaragua)	11–14 July 2011
12	Panama City (Panamá)	18–22 July 2011
13	Barranquilla (Colombia)	21–24 July 2011
14	Asunción (Paraguay)	27–30 July 2011
15	Reconquista (Argentina)	2–5 November 2011
16	Lima (Peru)	18–21 January 2012
17	Managua (Nicaragua)	2–6 July 2012
18	Tegucigalpa (Honduras)	9–12 July 2012
19	Guatemala City (Guatemala)	10–13 July 2012
20	Quito (Ecuador)	23–26 October 2012
21	La Paz (Bolivia)	29 October – 1 November 2012
22	Barranquilla (Colombia)	14–16 November 2012
23	Santa Fe (Argentina)	19–21 November 2012
24	Asunción (Paraguay)	21–24 November 2012
25	Montevideo (Uruguay)	26–29 November 2012
26	Accra (Ghana)	8–11 January 2013
27	Cañada de Gómez (Argentina)	12–15 March 2013
28	Mendoza (Argentina)	18–20 March 2013
29	Cochabamba (Bolivia)	16–18 July 2013
30	Uberlandia (Brazil)	29 July – 1 August 2013
31	Foz do Iguaçu (Brazil)	5–8 August 2013
32	Bauru (Brazil)	12–15 August 2013
33	Managua (Nicaragua)	5–7 August 2013
34	Beijing (China)	19–21 August 2013
35	Medellín (Colombia)	2–5 September 2013
36	Bogotá (Colombia)	2–5 September 2013
37	Quito (Ecuador)	23–26 September 2013
38	Barranquilla (Colombia)	8–10 October 2013
39	Nairobi (Kenya)	24–26 October 2013
40	Tegucigalpa (Honduras)	4–7 November 2013
41	Guatemala City (Guatemala)	11–13 November 2013
42	San Luis Potosí (México)	19–22 November 2013
43	Montevideo (Uruguay)	2–5 December 2013
44	Huancayo (Peru)	17–20 March 2014
45	Ica (Peru)	24–27 March 2014
46	Mendoza (Argentina)	24–26 April 2014
47	Cluj-Napoca (Romania)	24–26 April 2014
48	Havana (Cuba)	9–12 June 2014
49	Bogotá (Colombia)	16–19 June 2014
50	Quito (Ecuador)	16–19 June 2014
51	Medellín (Colombia)	25–28 June 2014
52	Accra (Ghana)	28–31 July 2014
53	Asunción (Paraguay)	30 July – 1 August 2014
54	Barranquilla (Colombia)	31 July – 1 August 2014
55	Salta (Argentina)	12–14 August 2014
56	Tegucigalpa (Honduras)	23–24 October 2014
57	Cochabamba (Bolivia)	27–28 October 2014
58	Guatemala (Guatemala)	3–5 November 2014
59	Oruro (Bolivia)	4–7 November 2014
60	Managua (Nicaragua)	10–12 December 2014
61	Lima (Peru)	9–13 February 2015
62	Barranquilla (Colombia)	19–21 March 2015
63	San Miguel de Tucumán (Argentina)	25–27 March 2015
64	Cuenca (Ecuador)	25–27 March 2015
65	Jujuy (Argentina)	11–13 May 2015
66	Medellín (Colombia)	24–27 June 2015
67	Guatemala (Guatemala)	25–27 June 2015
68	Managua (Nicaragua)	13–15 July 2015
69	Honolulu (United States)	1–2 August 2015
70	Tegucigalpa (Honduras)	24–27 August 2015
71	Bogotá (Colombia)	5–7 October 2015
72	Bucaramanga (Colombia)	11–14 October 2015

== Partnership courses ==
NASE has also cooperated with other associations to promote teacher training on astronomy, namely with UNESCO and the European Association for Astronomy Education-EAAE.

Meeting	Venue	Dates	Partners
1	Madrid (Spain)	26 Nov – 1 Dec 2009	European Association for Astronomy Education-EAAE and Spanish National Research Council - CSIC.
2	Varna (Bulgaria)	1–5 September 2010	European Association for Astronomy Education-EAAE and Varna Astronomical Observatory and Planetarium.
3	Ouagadougou (Burkina Faso)	14–15 December 2010	TAD (Teaching Astronomy for Development IAU Commission 46) and Université de Ouagadougou.
4	Cape Town (South Africa)	20 August 2011	OAD (Office for Astronomy Development IAU) and South African Astronomical Observatory
5	Beijing (China)	25 August 2012	Beijing Planetarium and IAU
6	Enontekiö (Finland)	28–30 December 2013	European Association for Astronomy Education - EAAE, LUMA and Helsinki University
7	San Luis Potosí (Mexico)	23 November 2013	Escuela de Estudios Superiores del Magisterio Potosino
8	London (United Kingdom)	20–24 July 2015	European Association for Astronomy Education-EAAE, Royal Astronomical Society and Greenwich Observatory

== See also ==
- List of astronomical societies
