= Uzcosmos =

Space agency of Uzbekistan

- Uzbek: O'zbekiston Respublikasi Raqamli texnologiyalar vazirligi huzuridagi Kosmik tadqiqotlar va texnologiyalar agentligi
- Uzcosmos insignia

Agency overview
- Formed: 30 August 2019
- Preceding agencies: State Agency for Space Research of Uzbekistan (1993–2002); Soviet space program (1955–1991, in the form of the Ministry of General Machine-Building)
- Type: Space agency
- Jurisdiction: Government of Uzbekistan
- Headquarters: 4 Muminov st, Mirzo Ulugbek Tashkent
- Director: Shukhrat Munavvarovich Kadirov
- Website: https://uzspace.uz/en

Uzcosmos, officially the Space Research and Technology Agency under the Ministry of Digital Technologies of the Republic of Uzbekistan, (Note: Uzbek: O'zbekiston Respublikasi Raqamli texnologiyalar vazirligi huzuridagi Kosmik tadqiqotlar va texnologiyalar agentligi) is the space agency of the Uzbekistan Government, responsible for the Uzbekistan's space program and unified state policy, as well as research in aeronautics and space.

The first space agency of the Uzbekistan Government was formed in 1993 as the State Agency for Space Research of Uzbekistan. However, it was later disestablished in 2002. After 17 years, on 30 August 2019, the new Uzcosmos agency was formed by a Presidential Decree of Shavkat Mirziyoyev.

== Satellites ==
Uzcosmos has one operational satellite in the orbit, and it plans to launch another one in 2028. There was also a discussion of sending the first Uzbek Astronaut into space at a presentation by Uzcosmos to President Mirziyoyev in February 2026.

=== Samarkand 2028 ===
The first satellite operated by Uzcosmos was launched on 5 August 2026 on the Jielong 3 rocket into the low Earth, Sun-synchronous orbit. It was built by the Chinese private aerospace manufacturer Star.Vision, and it serves as an Earth observation satellite. It was named after the International Astronautical Congress that will be held in Samarkand in 2028.
