= 1KUNS-PF =

Kenyan owned satellite

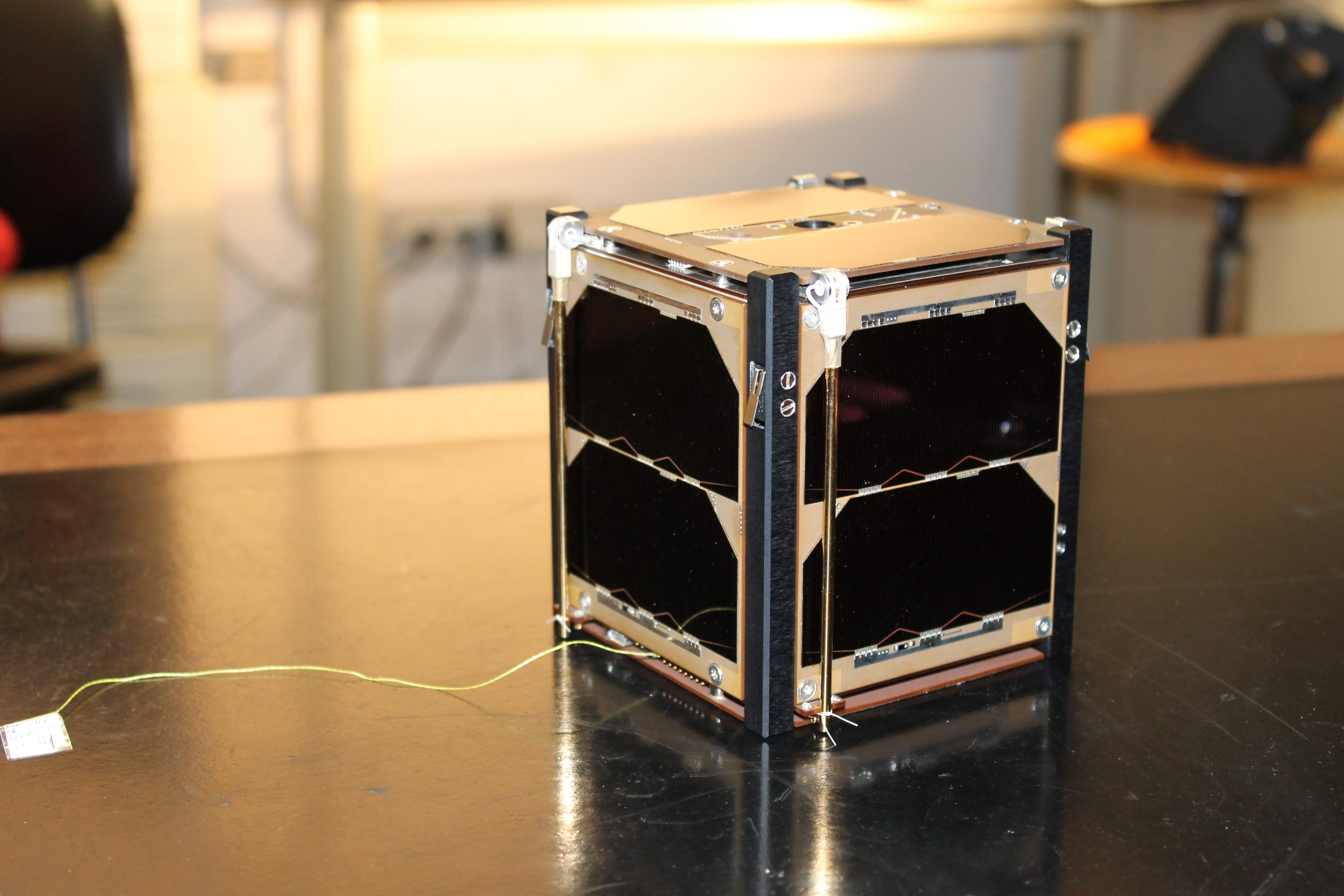
- 1KUNS-PF 1-U Cubesat
- Mission type: Technology demonstration Earth observation
- Operator: University of Nairobi
- COSPAR ID: 1998-067NP
- SATCAT no.: 43466

Spacecraft properties
- Spacecraft type: 1U CubeSat
- Launch mass: 1 kg (2.2 lb)
- Dimensions: 10 cm (4 in) cubed

Start of mission
- Launch date: 2 April 2018 UTC
- Launch site: Kennedy LC-39A
- Contractor: SpaceX
- Entered service: 11 May 2018, 10:51 UTC

End of mission
- Decay date: 11 June 2020

Orbital parameters
- Reference system: Geocentric
- Regime: Low Earth
- Semi-major axis: 6,778.8 km (4,212.2 mi)
- Eccentricity: 0.0004315
- Inclination: 51.619
- Period: 93

1KUNS-PF (1st Kenyan University NanoSatellite-Precursor Flight) was the first Kenyan-owned satellite. The cubesat was developed and assembled by the University of Nairobi for the Kenya Space Agency, with technical support provided by Japan's Aerospace Exploration Agency. The spacecraft was deployed from the International Space Station after being launched by a SpaceX Falcon 9 rocket.

== Background ==
The idea to launch a Kenyan-built satellite began in September 2015 with the planning and design of the space module. Financial support was obtained for the project when the University of Nairobi won a competitive grant from the United Nations Office for Outer Space Affairs (UNOOSA) in 2016. The University of Nairobi was the first institution to benefit from a joint project between the United Nations and JAXA. The satellite was given the acronym 1KUNS-PF, which stands for which First Kenya University Nano Satellite-Precursor Flight. External technical support was provided by Sapienza University along with two Italian companies. The cost of the programme was roughly one million dollars. The satellite orbited 400 kilometres (250 mi) above the Earth.

== Launch and purpose ==
On 2 April 2018, the satellite was carried to the International Space Station on board the SpaceX CRS-14 mission which launched on a Falcon 9 rocket with help from the National Aeronautic and Space Administration. It was deployed from the space station into orbit from the Kibō module on 11 May 2018. Its signal was successfully received from a ground station in Rome by the students of Sapienza University. Its launch was the third for an African country after GhanaSat-1 and Nigeria EduSat-1, which went into service in 2017. In addition to 1KUNS-PF two other nano satellites, Ubakusat and Proyecto Irazú were also on board the Falcon-9 rocket to the ISS. All three satellites were deployed into space from the ISS by Japanese astronaut Norishige Kanai.

The 1KUNS-PF was a 1 unit cubesat. It was an experimental cubesat, with the main mission being to create awareness to the locals on the benefits of space uses. On board the cubesat, there were camera payloads, which were used to take mapping images of Kenya and other East Africa countries within the vicinity of its orbit. The cubesat was designed to have a lifespan of one year and its operations were within the UN space use mitigation measures. 1KUNS-PF deorbited in June 2020.
