= Irazú (satellite) =

First Costa Rican satellite

- Mission type: Technology demonstration Earth observation
- Operator: Costa Rica Institute of Technology
- COSPAR ID: 1998-067NR
- SATCAT no.: 43468

Spacecraft properties
- Spacecraft type: 1U CubeSat
- Launch mass: 1 kg (2.2 lb)
- Dimensions: 10 cm (4 in) cubed

Start of mission
- Launch date: 2 April 2018 UTC
- Rocket: Falcon 9 FT, CRS-14
- Launch site: Kennedy LC-39A
- Contractor: SpaceX
- Entered service: 11 May 2018, 08:51 UTC

End of mission
- Decay date: 4 March 2020

Orbital parameters
- Reference system: Geocentric
- Regime: Low Earth
- Semi-major axis: 6,778.8 km (4,212.2 mi)
- Eccentricity: 0.0001276
- Inclination: 51.64
- Period: 92.60

Irazú was the first Costa Rican satellite to be launched into space. The nanosatellite was launched into space on 2 April 2018, on board a Falcon 9 rocket headed for the International Space Station. It was expected to orbit the Earth for six months with the function of monitoring carbon, humidity, and temperature levels in Costa Rican forests. Funds for the launch of satellite were provided, in a significant part, through a Kickstarter crowdfunding campaign.

== Background ==
The design, development, and financing of the Irazú satellite involved the Central American Association for Aeronautics (ACAE), based in Costa Rica, and engineers from the Costa Rica Institute of Technology. Fifteen professors and students from Costa Rica Institute of Technology and from the National Training Institute worked on the project.

The 10-centimeter cube "nano" satellite monitored temperature, humidity, and carbon dioxide fixation with the purpose of climate change analysis. Building the satellite from its individual component took six months and required an additional six months for testing. After the initial testing period, Irazú was sent to Japan where it was further tested at the Kyushu Institute of Technology. It was later sent to the Japan Aerospace Exploration Agency for onward delivery to NASA.

The total cost of the project was US$500,000 with much of the money coming from ACAE. The Costa Rica Institute of Technology was tasked to provide the final $75,000 needed to complete the last stages of construction, testing and deployment into space. The institute turned to crowdfunding experts from Ernst & Young to raise the expected amount. Through Kickstarter, about 800 donors from all over the world helped to raise the funds needed.

== Launch ==
On 2 April 2018, the satellite was carried to the International Space Station (ISS) on board a Falcon 9 rocket with help from NASA. It was deployed from the space station into its orbit from the KIBO satellite deployment module on 11 May 2018. Its launch coincided with two other satellites namely Ubakusat and 1KUNS-PF. All three satellites were deployed into space from the ISS by Japanese astronaut Norishige Kanai through the Kibo module. The satellite orbited the Earth at a height of about 400 kilometres (250 mi) above the Earth and was expected to operate for six months.

== Communication ==
Irazú communicated with two Earth stations: the experimental station at San Carlos, and the monitoring station on the central Campus of Costa Rica Institute of Technology in Cartago. At the monitoring station, information was relayed from space concerning the level of tree growth in the country. The data was used to determine the approximate carbon fixation rate of Costa Rican forests.
