= El Salvador Aerospace Institute =

Salvadoran national space agency

- Instituto Aerospacial de El Salvador
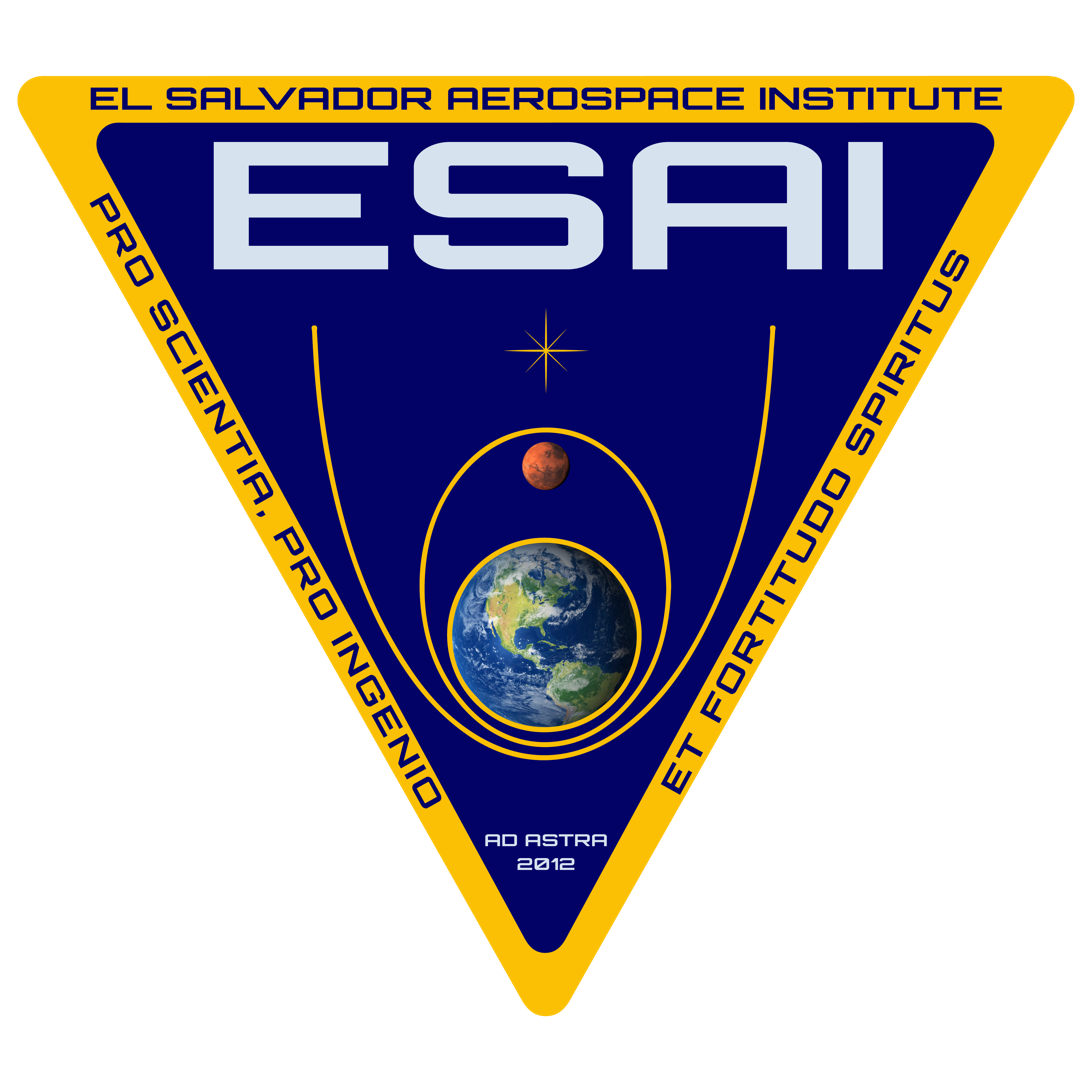

Space agency overview
- Formed: 7 September 2021
- Type: Space agency
- Jurisdiction: Government of El Salvador
- Headquarters: San Salvador, San Salvador, El Salvador; land mark_region:El Salvador 13.70380°N 89.21584°W
- Employees: 51-200
- Space agency executive: Luis Alfaro, President and founder
- Website: https://www.esai.sv/

Footnotes
- ESAI was created in early 2012 and promote to agency by the Salvadoran government

The El Salvador Aerospace institute (ESAI Spanish: Instituto Aerospacial de El Salvador is the national space agency of El Salvador, began in 2012 and became the official national agency in El Salvador on 7 September 2021.

== History ==
The ESAI was first start in early 2012 by Dr. Luis Alfaro, a philanthropist, politician who funded STEM programs around El Salvador universities, As a result of this the ESAI was gained recognition from international organizations like United Nations Office for Outer Space Affairs (UNOOSA), University Space Engineering Consortium (UNISEC-GLOBAL), and European Space Agency (ESA). At that time, ESAI was just a small group of Salvadoran scientists from the STEM program with the plan to become the National space program of El Salvador. In 2016 ESAI launched the Global Aerospace program in which ESAI had it first successful launch. ESAI members were invited to participate in South Korean space program training. On September 7, 2021, the government of El Salvador had officially made ESAI the national space agency of El Salvador.

== Programs ==
STEM program

The ESAI has many STEM programs all around El Salvador universities, mostly focusing on the progression on aerospace in El Salvador, some of these University are Catholic University of El Salvador (UNICAES), National University of El Salvador (UES), and Centroamerican University (UCA).

Weather ballons

The ESAI had begun a weather balloon program and had their first successful launch in December 2013 with program Esfera. The weather balloons were the beginning of the ESAI which gave the ESAI the credit and influence to become the national space agency of El Salvador.

Sounding rocket

In 2011 ESAI started program Torogoz to launch sounding rocket into the atmosphere to test ESAI rocket to see if they could make it to sub orbit, the launches happened in the locations of Barraciega test range, and Corral de mulas test range.

== See also ==
- List of Government space agencies
- List of space agencies
