= Bulgaria 1300 =

Bulgaria's first artificial satellite

- Mission type: Science
- Operator: BSA
- COSPAR ID: 1981-075A
- SATCAT no.: 12645
- Mission duration: 34 years, 7 months and 12 days (achieved)

Spacecraft properties
- Manufacturer: BAC; BAS; SSA
- Launch mass: 1,500 kilograms (3,300 lb)

Start of mission
- Launch date: 7 August 1981, 13:35 UTC
- Rocket: Vostok-2M
- Launch site: Plesetsk 43/3

End of mission
- Last contact: March 20, 2016
- Decay date: 2550 (planned)

Orbital parameters
- Reference system: Geocentric
- Regime: Low Earth
- Perigee altitude: 792 kilometres (492 mi)
- Apogee altitude: 883 kilometres (549 mi)
- Inclination: 81.2 degrees
- Period: 101.6
- Epoch: Epoch start: 1981-08-06 20:00:00 UTC

Interkosmos 22, more commonly known as Bulgaria 1300 (Bulgarian: Интеркосмос 22-България 1300), was Bulgaria's first artificial satellite.

It was named after the 1300th anniversary of the foundation of the Bulgarian state. It was designed to study the ionosphere and magnetosphere of the Earth.

== Description ==
The satellite was developed by the Bulgarian Space Agency around the "Meteor" bus, provided by the Soviet Union as part of the Interkosmos program. Assembly took place in Bulgaria, and the spacecraft was launched from Plesetsk in 13:35 local time on 7 August 1981. During that same year the Bulgarian government organized a massive celebration to commemorate the 1300th anniversary of the country's founding.

Bulgaria 1300 was successfully inserted in a near-polar orbit. The outer skin of the spacecraft, including the solar panels, is coated with a conducting material in order to allow the proper measurement of electric fields and low energy plasma. Power is provided by the two solar panels, which generate 2 kW of electricity. A rechargeable battery pack is used as an energy supply when the spacecraft is in an eclipse period. Gathered data is stored on two tape recorders, each with a capacity of 60 megabits. The main transmitter radiates 10 W in the 130-MHz band. No operational limit was planned.

The spacecraft operated for two years and then data transmission stopped. In the spring of 2016, however, it became clear that the satellite was active. It is not expected to reenter until approximately the year 2550.

== Equipment ==
The satellite contains a large set of scientific devices, designed and built in Bulgaria:

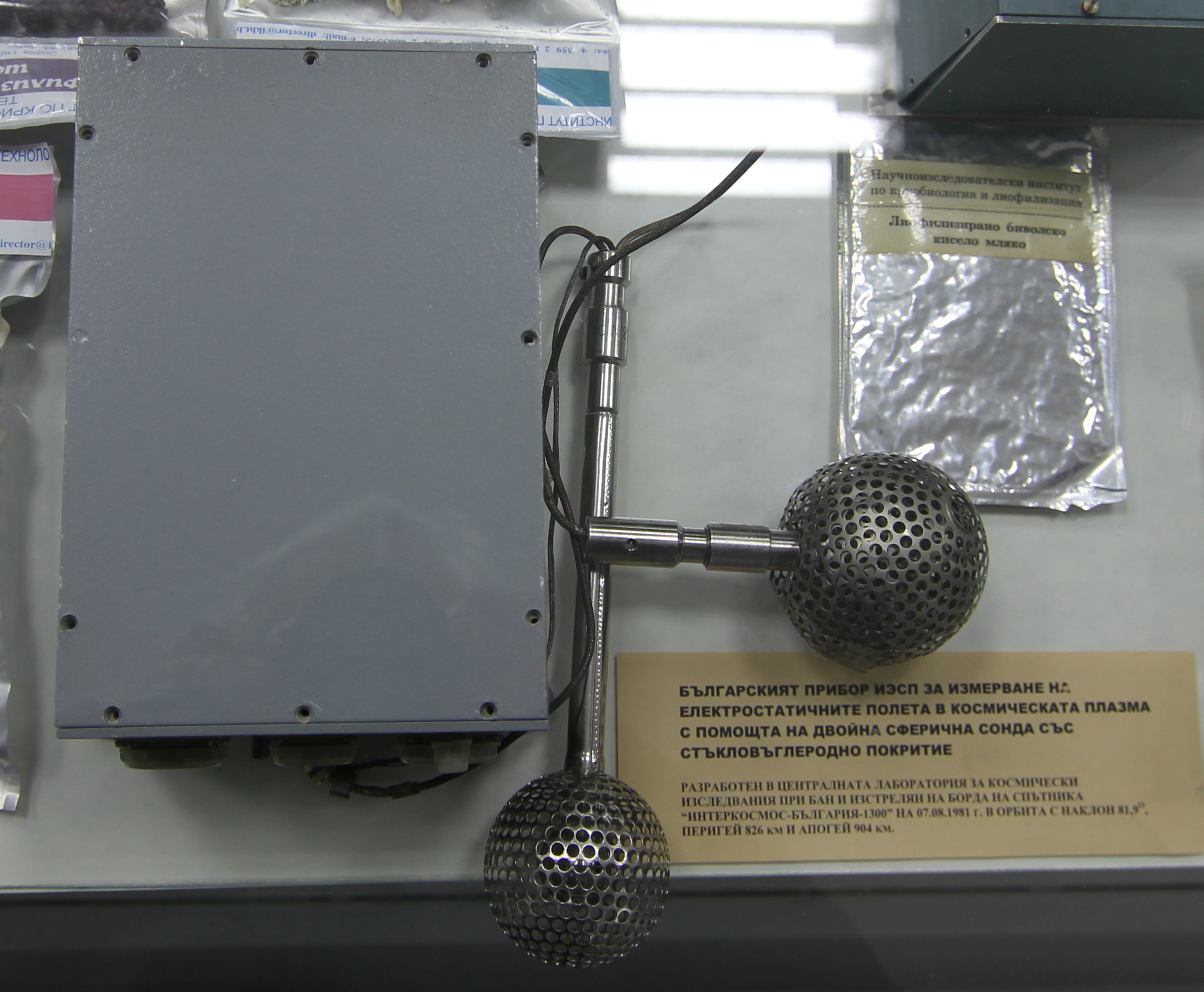
A copy of the SEIT unit from the satellite, National Polytechnical Museum in Sofia

- Ion Drift Meter combined with a Retarding Potential Analyzer;
- Spherical Electrostatic Ion Trap (SEIT);
- Cylindrical Langmuir probe;
- Double spherical electron temperature probes;
- Low-Energy Electron-Proton Electrostatic Analyzer Array in 3 orthogonal directions
- Ion Energy-Mass Composition Analyzers
- Wavelength Scanning UV Photometer
- Proton Solid-State Telescope
- Visible Airglow Photometers
- Triaxial Spherical Vector Electric Field Probes
- Triaxial Fluxgate Magnetometer

== See also ==
- Artificial satellite
- Timeline of artificial satellites and space probes
