= Ethiopian Space Science and Technology Institute =

Ethiopian government organization for space science and technology

- Formation: 14 October 2016; 9 years ago
- Headquarters: Addis Ababa, Ethiopia
- Region served: Ethiopia
- Director-General: Abdisa Yilma
- Deputy Director-General: Yeshurun Alemayehu Adde
- Affiliations: Ethiopian Space Science Society
- Budget: 190 million birr (2022)

The Ethiopian Space Science and Technology Institute (ESSTI; Amharic: የኢትዮጵያ ስፔስ ሳይንስና ቴክኖሎጂ ኢ ንስቲትዩት, romanized: ye’ītiyop’iya sipēsi sayinisina tēkinolojī ī nisitītiyuti) is an Ethiopian institute for research, training and infrastructure development in space science, created in 2016.

== Creation ==
The Ethiopian Space Science Society (ESSS) was created as a citizens' association in 2004. ESSS helped to organise the creation of Entoto Observatory in 2014 and of the Ethiopian Space Science and Technology Institute in 2016. ESSTI was formally established by the Hailemariam Desalegn Cabinet, under regulation No. 916/2015.

== Aims ==
ESSTI was mandated to carry out research and training in space science and to develop and encourage space science and aerospace development and infrastructure in Ethiopia.

== Leadership and structure ==
Abdissa Yilma was ESSTI's general director in 2021. As of December 2020, Yeshurun Alemayehu was ESSTI's deputy general director.

Together with the creation of ESSTI, the Space Council was created to oversee Ethiopian space science policies and the implementation of ESSTI proposals.

== Satellite launches ==
ESSTI's first satellite, ETRSS-1, is a 72 kg remote sensing microsatellite, co-designed by Ethiopian and Chinese engineers and launched in December 2019.

ESSTI's second satellite, ET-SMART-RSS, an 8.9 kg nanosatellite, also designed and built in Ethiopian–Chinese collaboration, was launched from Wenchang Spacecraft Launch Site on 22 December 2020.

== Research and teaching ==
Research and teaching departments in ESSTI include the Astronomy and Astrophysics Research Department, with research in fields including extragalactic astronomy, stellar astronomy, cultural astronomy and cosmology. As of February 2021, the department had graduated 11 master's students and 5 doctoral students. Mirjana Pović, an assistant professor of the department and head of the department from 2018 to 2020, was awarded the inaugural Jocelyn Bell Burnell Inspiration Medal in 2021 by the European Astronomical Society for her contributions to the development of "astronomy, science and education as a route out of poverty and to improve the quality of life for young people in Africa."
