= ETRSS-1 =

Ethiopian satellite

Ethiopian Remote Sensing Satellite (ETRSS) 1
- Mission type: Earth Observation
- Operator: Ethiopian Space Science and Technology Institute
- COSPAR ID: 2019-093
- SATCAT no.: 44884
- Website: etssti.org^{[usurped]}

Spacecraft properties
- BOL mass: 65 kg (143 lb)

Start of mission
- Launch date: 20 December 2019, 03:22 UTC
- Rocket: Long March 4B
- Launch site: Taiyuan Satellite Launch Center
- Deployment date: December 2019

Orbital parameters
- Regime: Low Earth

ETRSS-1 is the first satellite launched by Ethiopia. It is an Earth Observation Satellite. After launch the Ethiopian Space Science and Technology Institute spent several months calibrating and testing it. Photos were released in February 2020.

== Specifications ==
- Application: Earth Observation
- Spatial resolution: 13.7 METERS
- Number of bands: 4
- Revisit time: 4 days
- Height from the earth: 700 kilometers
- Orbit type: low orbit
- Operator: Ethiopian Space Science and Technology Institute (ESSTI)
- Weight/mass: 64 kg
- Power: Solar arrays, batteries
