= Costa Rican Space Agency =

Space agency based in Costa Rica

Costa Rican Space Agency (Agencia Espacial Costarricense [AEC]) is a national space research and development bureau based in San Jose, Costa Rica. It is the first space agency to be created and operated by a Central American nation.

Law 9960 authorizing the creation of the agency was passed by the Constitutional Congress of Costa Rica by a vote of 37-3 on February 8, 2021, and signed on March 27 by President Carlos Alvarado Quesada. The AEC has autonomy as a "non-state, legally established public entity", but is subject to the guidelines of the Ministry of Science, Innovation, Technology and Telecommunications (Ministerio de Ciencia, Innovación, Tecnología y Telecomunicaciones [MICITT]). It is governed by a five-person board of directors, consisting of:

- La persona jerarca del Ministerio de Ciencia, Tecnología y Telecomunicaciones (Micitt) o, en su defecto, el viceministro de Ciencia y Tecnología (The Minister of MICITT or, failing that, the Vice Minister)
- La Dirección General de Aviación Civil (The Director General of Civil Aviation)
- La persona jerarca del Ministerio de Relaciones Exteriores y Culto o, en su defecto, el viceministro (The Minister of Foreign Affairs and Worship or, failing that, the Vice Minister)
- Un representante del sector aeroespacial privado, con experiencia y formación profesional comprobada, que propondrá una terna y será designado por el Ministerio de Economía, Industria y Comercio (MEIC) (A representative of the private aerospace sector ... appointed by the Ministry of Economy, Industry and Commerce)
- Un representante del Consejo Nacional de Rectores (Conare) (A representative of the National Council of Rectors)

The board held its first formal meeting on August 5, 2021.

Among its goals are peaceful space exploration and development, encouraging Costa Rican companies to compete in this sector, and obeying international laws. While the legislation stipulates that the AEC be headquartered in San Jose, it allows for the creation of a space center in Guanacaste Province.

While the news brought widespread support worldwide, concerns were raised, by among others the Office of the Comptroller General of the Republic, about whether its funding could have been better utilized in other, more urgent areas. For its first five years of existence, it will receive a mandatory 0.4% "of the free surplus settled at the end of the previous economic period" from non-financial public sector institutions. It will also benefit from donations and income it generates on its own. President Quesada reached out to Costa Rican-American NASA astronaut and founder and CEO of Ad Astra Rocket Company Franklin Chang-Díaz for advice on the financing of the agency.
