= Challenge-1 =

Artificial satellite

- Mission type: Communications
- Operator: TelNet
- COSPAR ID: 2021-022AA
- SATCAT no.: 47956

Spacecraft properties
- Manufacturer: TelNet

Start of mission
- Launch date: 22 March 2021
- Rocket: Soyuz-2
- Launch site: Baikonur, Kazakhstan

Orbital parameters
- Reference system: Low Earth orbit

Challenge-1 or Challenge One (TelNet Challenge One) is the first domestically made satellite from Tunisia. It was launched on 22 March 2021 by Russia on a Soyuz 2 rocket from Baikonur in Kazakhstan. The satellite was built by a team of telecommunications engineers from TelNet, as an Internet of Things satellite. This marked Tunisia as the 6th African country and the 1st country in the Maghreb to manufacture its own satellite. The satellite is to be the first of a constellation of 30 satellites. The satellite was first announced in September 2019 for a July 2020 launch.

== Mission ==
The satellite specializes in Internet of Things technology, and it is the first one that uses LoRaWAN protocol for communications. This protocol makes it easier to be individually programmed, controlled, or reset, in space, from Telnet labs.
