= European Association for Astronomy Education =

Organization

- EAAE Logo
- Formation: 1995
- Type: Astronomy Education Organization
- Members: teachers from 26 European countries
- Website: www.eaae-astronomy.org

The European Association for Astronomy Education or EAAE is a non-profit European organization for the promotion of science education in general, and of astronomy in particular.

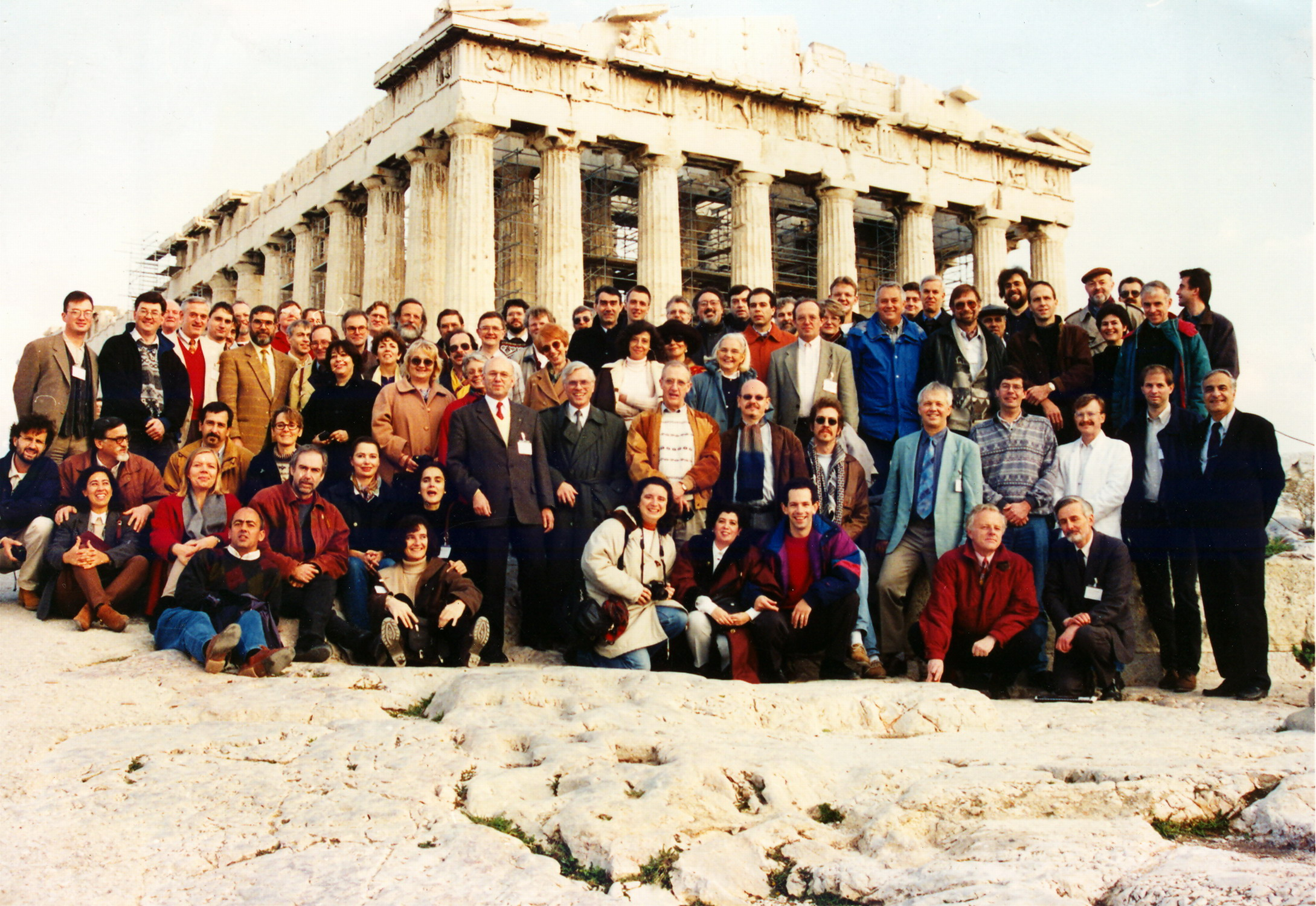
Representatives for the foundation of the European Association for Astronomical Education in Athens on November 25, 1995 .

The Organization was founded on November 25, 1995, in Athens, as a result of the Declaration of the EU/ESO workshop on Teaching of Astronomy in Europe's Secondary Schools that was held at the European Southern Observatory (ESO) Headquarters in Garching in November 1994.

== Structure ==
The Professional association|Association gathers the General Assembly for strategic decisions, and an Executive Council as the operational management. There are also National Representatives with a role on promoting the EAAE and its activities in their countries.

== Working Groups ==
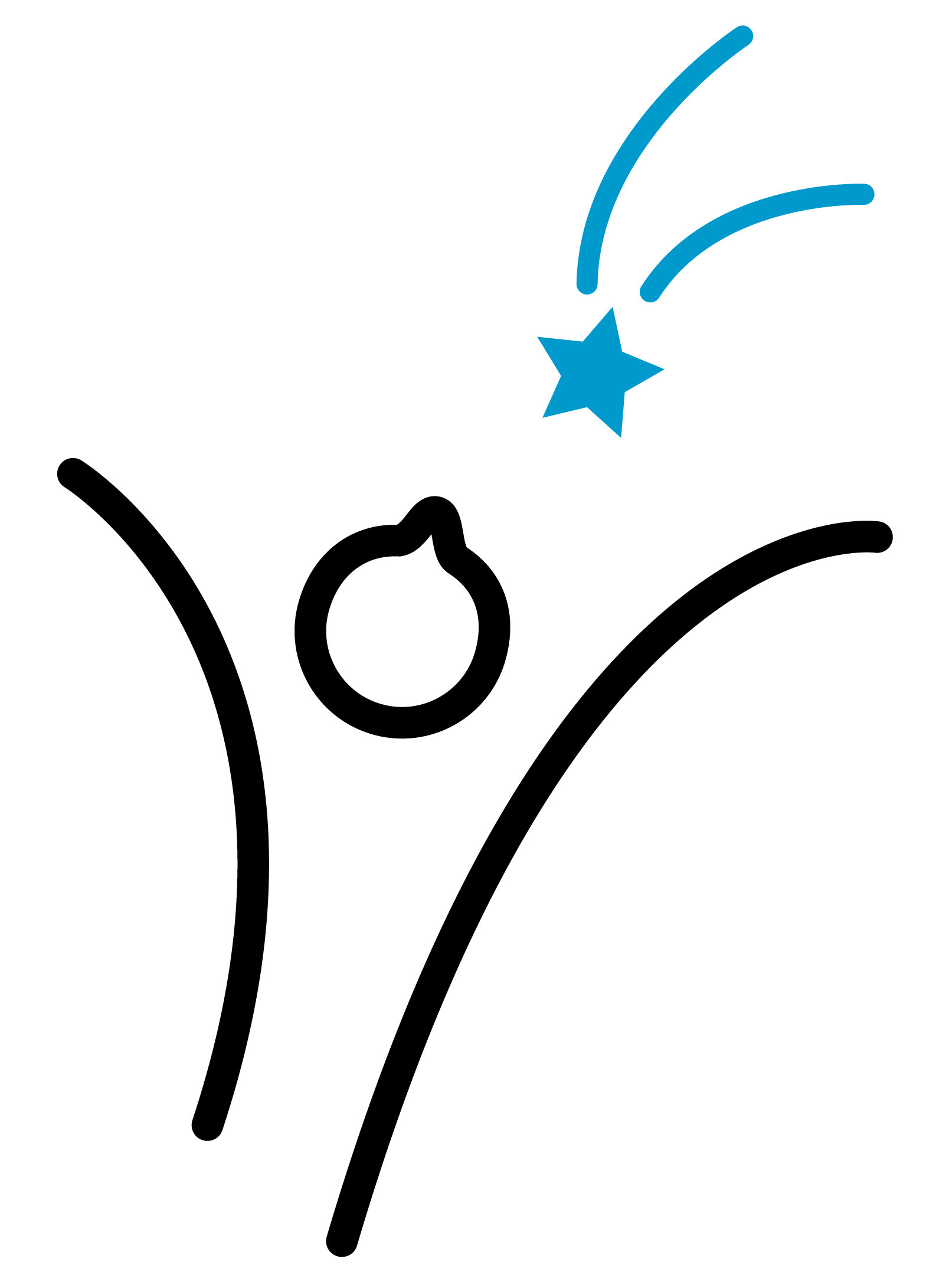
Catch a Star is a contest organised as a collaboration between EAAE and ESO.

International activities are promoted through the activity of three Working Groups.

- Working Group 1 "Collaborative Projects" intends to promote collaborative work between teachers and students of different countries by creating specific science project activities for schools.
- Working Group 2 "Catch a Star" promotes school research projects about astronomical objects through a contest. The previous contests have been organized as a joint venture with the European Southern Observatory (ESO).
- Working Group 3 "Summer Schools" promotes teacher training about Astronomy Education. It provides an opportunity for teachers to learn about simple educational materials for their classes.

== Partnerships ==
The EAAE has had a long term collaboration with the European Southern Observatory (ESO) in many projects, including "Astronomy On-Line" or "Catch a Star" and has also collaborated with the European Space Agency (ESA) and with the European Organization for Nuclear Research (CERN) on the organization of Physics on Stage and Science on Stage. Like most major organizations, since 2009 the EAAE has grown in social networks and has now mirrors of the "EAAE News" on Facebook, Twitter and Portal to the Universe. The EAAE has also collaborations with The European Planetarium Network (EuroPlaNet) and with the Euro-Asian Association of Teachers of Astronomy (EAATA).

== See also ==
- List of astronomical societies
