= K-Space Trivandrum =

Indian space technology industrial park

K‑Space Park Trivandrum
- K‑Space Park Society
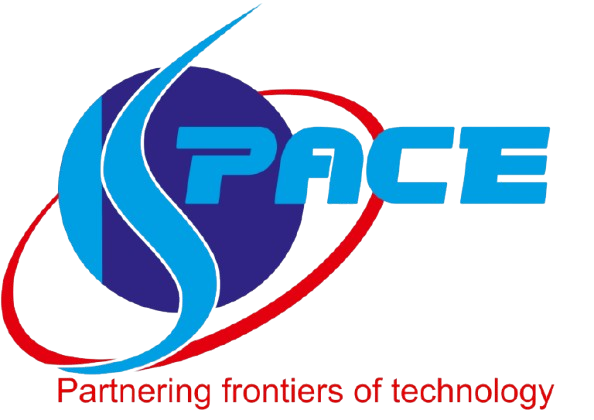
- Formation: 2019
- Founder: Government of Kerala
- Headquarters: Thiruvananthapuram
- Region served: Space technology, aerospace, startups
- Services: Incubation, R&D, prototyping, defense collaboration
- Key people: Scientists from Vikram Sarabhai Space Centre (advisory board)
- Parent organization: Government of Kerala
- Website: https://kspace.kerala.gov.in/

K‑Space Park Trivandrum (also known as Kerala Space Park) is a space-technology industrial park located in Technocity, Thiruvananthapuram, India. Established by the Government of Kerala, it aims to foster innovation, manufacturing, and startups in space and aerospace technologies, in collaboration with the Indian Institute of Space Science and Technology, Indian Space Research Organisation (ISRO) and its regional centre, the Vikram Sarabhai Space Centre (VSSC).

== History ==
The concept was first proposed in 2019 by the Kerala government, and further highlighted during the "Space Technology Conclave" in early 2020. In December 2022, the Kerala Cabinet approved creation of the registered society "K‑Space", allocating 18.56 acres in Technopark Phase IV and sanctioning seed funding of ₹2 crore. In July 2024, K‑Space and VSSC signed a memorandum of understanding, integrating ISRO scientists into the park’s advisory board.

== Objectives ==
K‑Space Park is intended to support:

- Manufacture of launch-vehicle components
- Satellite design, assembly, and testing
- Ground-segment infrastructure (e.g., radars, communication systems)
- Applications in Earth observation, data analytics, and satellite communication Services
- Aerospace and defence R&D

Additionally, in early 2025, an Integrated Defence Industrial Park (IDIP) was proposed in partnership with BrahMos Aerospace, with a projected investment of ₹1,000 crore.

== Campus and Infrastructure ==
The K‑Space Park first phase campus occupies 18.5 acres adjacent to Technopark. Facilities planned include: Common Facility Centre (ground + 5 floors) for incubation and shared labs Research & Development Centre (ground + 4 floors) for prototyping An elevated sky‑bridge connecting the two buildings

The design features landscaped areas and preserved natural waterways ("thodu"). The project is funded by a ₹241 crore loan from NABARD, with construction expected to begin around April–May 2025 and complete within approximately 30 months.

== Defence Initiative ==
In January 2025, K‑Space proposed a 100-acre defence-industrial park near Neyyar Dam, intended for defence manufacturing units and linked to the operations of BrahMos Aerospace, with an anticipated ₹1,000 crore investment.

== Governance and Partnerships ==
K‑Space Park operates under a registered society, staffed by personnel from the Kerala IT Mission and Technopark. VSSC scientists advise under the 2024 MoU. Collaborating organizations include:

- ISRO (VSSC)
- CNES (France)
- Airbus BizLab
- IIST
- KTU

== Regional Context ==
Thiruvananthapuram hosts significant space and defence institutions, including:

- Thumba Equatorial Rocket Launching Station (TERLS)
- Vikram Sarabhai Space Centre (VSSC)
- Liquid Propulsion Systems Centre (LPSC)
- BrahMos Aerospace
- Keltron
- Indian Institute of Space Science and Technology

This concentration reinforces the city’s status as an emerging centre for space-tech and defence industries.

== See also ==
- Technopark, Trivandrum
- Vikram Sarabhai Space Centre
- Indian Space Research Organisation
- Thumba Equatorial Rocket Launching Station
