= SpaceX CRS-14 =

2018 American resupply spaceflight to the ISS

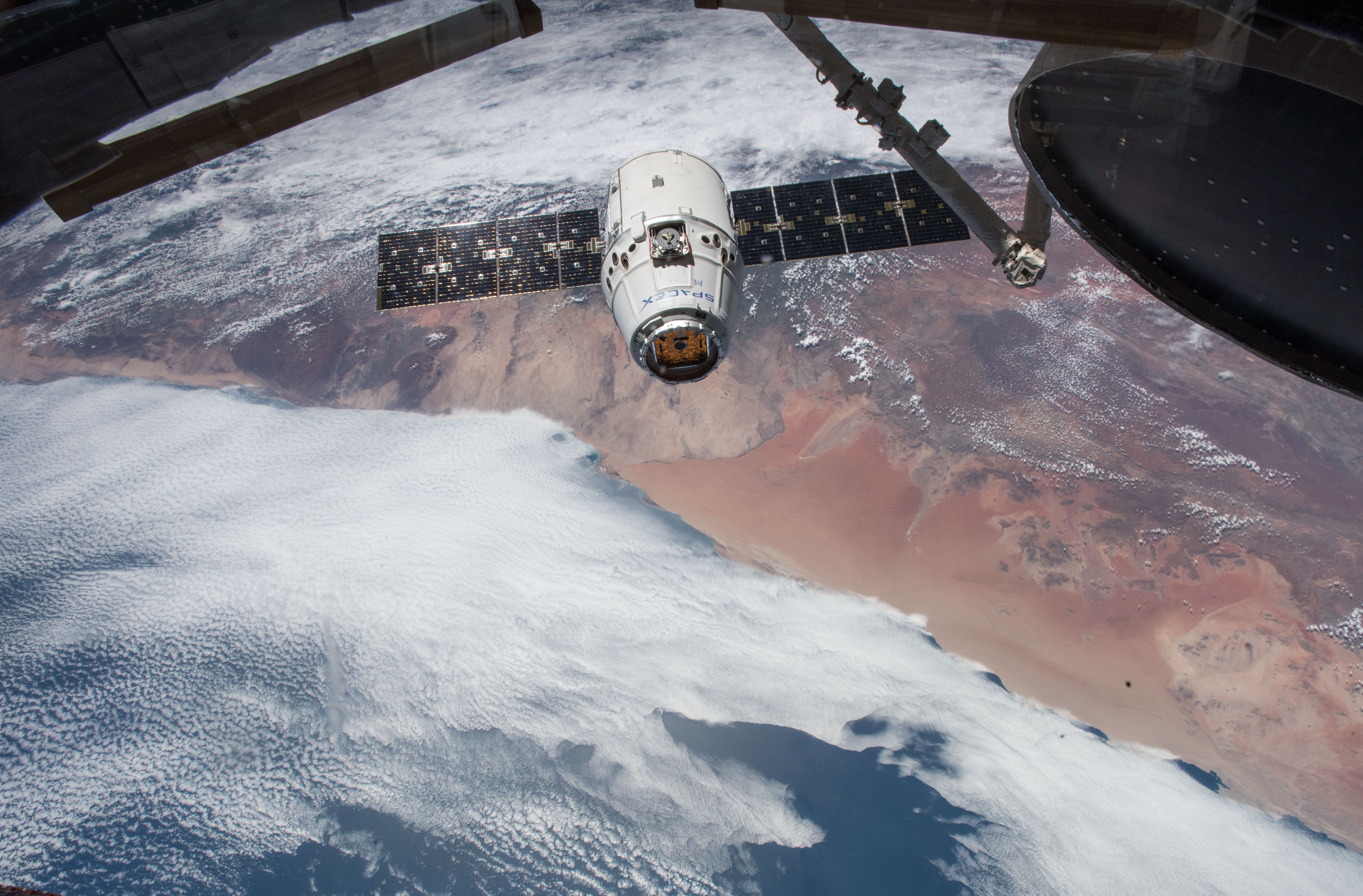
- SpaceX CRS-14 arriving at the ISS on 4 April 2018
- Names: SpX-14
- Mission type: ISS resupply
- Operator: SpaceX
- COSPAR ID: 2018-032A
- SATCAT no.: 43267
- Mission duration: 32 days, 22 hours, 32 minutes

Spacecraft properties
- Spacecraft: Dragon 1 C110
- Spacecraft type: Dragon 1
- Manufacturer: SpaceX
- Dry mass: 4,200 kg (9,300 lb)
- Dimensions: Height: 6.1 m (20 ft); Diameter: 3.7 m (12 ft)

Start of mission
- Launch date: 2 April 2018, 20:30:38 UTC
- Rocket: Falcon 9 Full Thrust Block 4 (B1039)
- Launch site: Cape Canaveral, SLC-40
- Contractor: SpaceX

End of mission
- Disposal: Recovered
- Landing date: 5 May 2018, 19:03 UTC
- Landing site: Pacific Ocean off Baja California

Orbital parameters
- Reference system: Geocentric
- Regime: Low Earth
- Inclination: 51.6°

Berthing at ISS
- Berthing port: Harmony nadir
- RMS capture: 4 April 2018, 10:40 UTC
- Berthing date: 4 April 2018, 13:00 UTC
- Unberthing date: 5 May 2018, ≈05:30
- RMS release: 5 May 2018, 13:23 UTC
- Time berthed: ≈30 days and 16 hours

Cargo
- Mass: 2,647 kg (5,836 lb)
- Pressurised: 1,721 kg (3,794 lb)
- Unpressurised: 926 kg (2,041 lb)
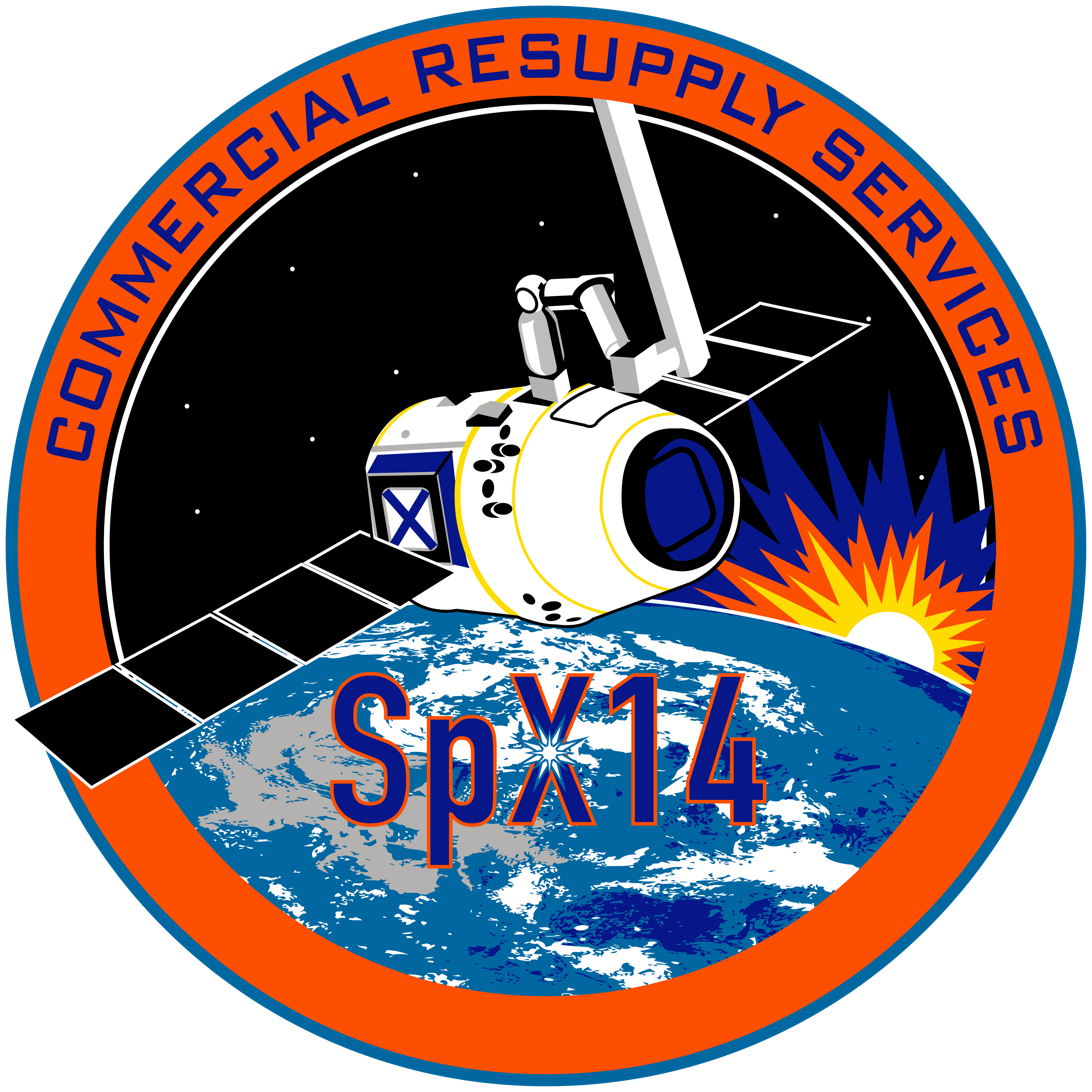
- NASA SpX-14 mission patch Commercial Resupply Services Cargo Dragon

SpaceX CRS-14, also known as SpX-14, was a Commercial Resupply Service mission to the International Space Station launched on 2 April 2018. The mission was contracted by NASA and was flown by SpaceX. This mission reused the Falcon 9 first stage booster previously flown on CRS-12 and the Dragon capsule flown on CRS-8.

== Mission overview ==
In early 2015, NASA awarded a contract extension to SpaceX for three additional CRS missions (CRS-13 to CRS-15). In June 2016, a NASA Inspector General report had this mission manifested for February 2018. The flight was then delayed to 9 February and 13 March 2018.

Launch occurred on 2 April 2018 at 20:30 UTC on a Falcon 9 Full Thrust rocket from Cape Canaveral Air Force Station Space Launch Complex 40. The Dragon spacecraft rendezvoused with the ISS on 4 April; it was captured by Canadarm2 at 10:40 UTC and was berthed to the Harmony module at 13:00 UTC. It remained there for just under 31 days before being unberthed by Canadarm2 on 5 May 2018, scheduled for 05:30 UTC. The spacecraft was released at 13:23 UTC and autonomously backed away from the station to a safe distance before firing its thrusters for a deorbit burn at 18:06 UTC. Dragon splashed down in the Pacific Ocean at 19:03 UTC to be retrieved by a SpaceX recovery crew and transported to the Port of Los Angeles, returning 1,743 kg (3,843 lb) of cargo to Earth.

No attempt was made to recover the first stage booster; instead, the booster was used to conduct experimental maneuvers designed to test the limits of its flight trajectory.

== Payload ==
NASA contracted for the CRS-14 mission from SpaceX and therefore determined the primary payload, date/time of launch, and orbital parameters for the Dragon space capsule. CRS-14 carried a total of 2,647 kg (5,836 lb) of material into orbit. This includes 1,721 kg (3,794 lb) of pressurised cargo with packaging bound for the International Space Station, and 926 kg (2,041 lb) of unpressurised cargo. The unpressurised component is composed of two external station experiments, Atmosphere-Space Interactions Monitor (ASIM) and Materials ISS Experiment Flight Facility (MISSE-FF), and a Pump and Flow Control Subassembly (PFCS) orbital replacement unit for the station.

Multiple payloads from national labs are also included, one of which is the RemoveDEBRIS mission which will be deployed from the ISS. The mission aims to test a harpoon and a net on test debris that the mission carries to evaluate the viability of these methods to be used in future missions to remove real space debris. At the end of the mission the RemoveDEBRIS spacecraft will deploy a large dragsail to accelerate its own deorbit to avoid becoming space debris itself. HP was also contracted by NASA to install a new inkjet printer for the US lab.

The following is a breakdown of cargo bound for the ISS:

- Science investigations: 1,070 kg (2,359 lb)
- Crew supplies: 344 kg (758 lb)
- Vehicle hardware: 148 kg (326 lb)
- Spacewalk equipment: 99 kg (218 lb)
- Computer resources: 49 kg (108 lb)
  - New HP Workstation laptops
  - HP Envy inkjet printer
- Russian hardware: 11 kg (24 lb)
- External payloads: 926 kg (2,041 lb)
  - Atmosphere-Space Interactions Monitor (ASIM)
  - Materials ISS Experiment Flight Facility (MISSE-FF)
  - Pump and Flow Control Subassembly (PFCS)

== Gallery ==
SpaceX CRS-14
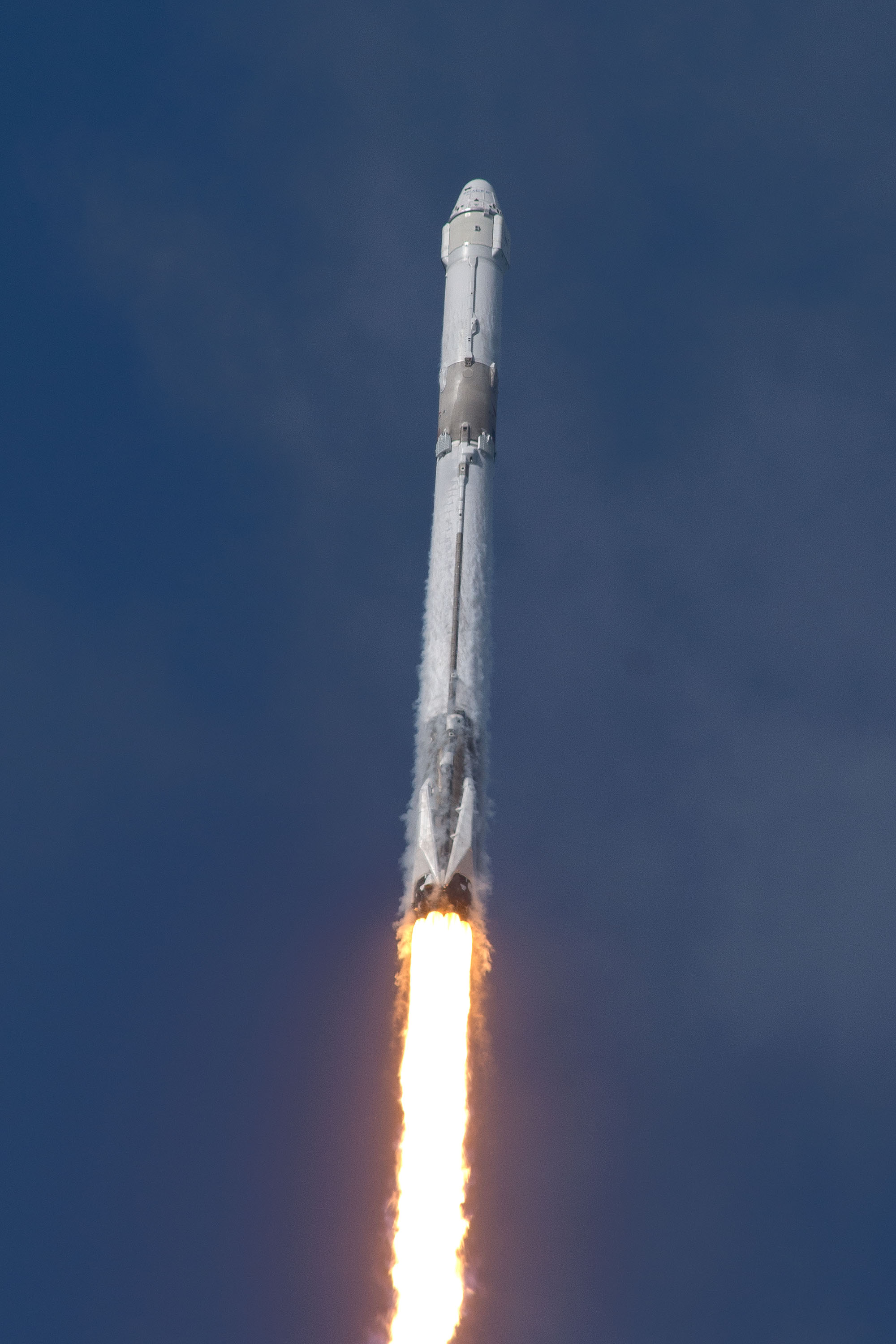
Launch of CRS-14

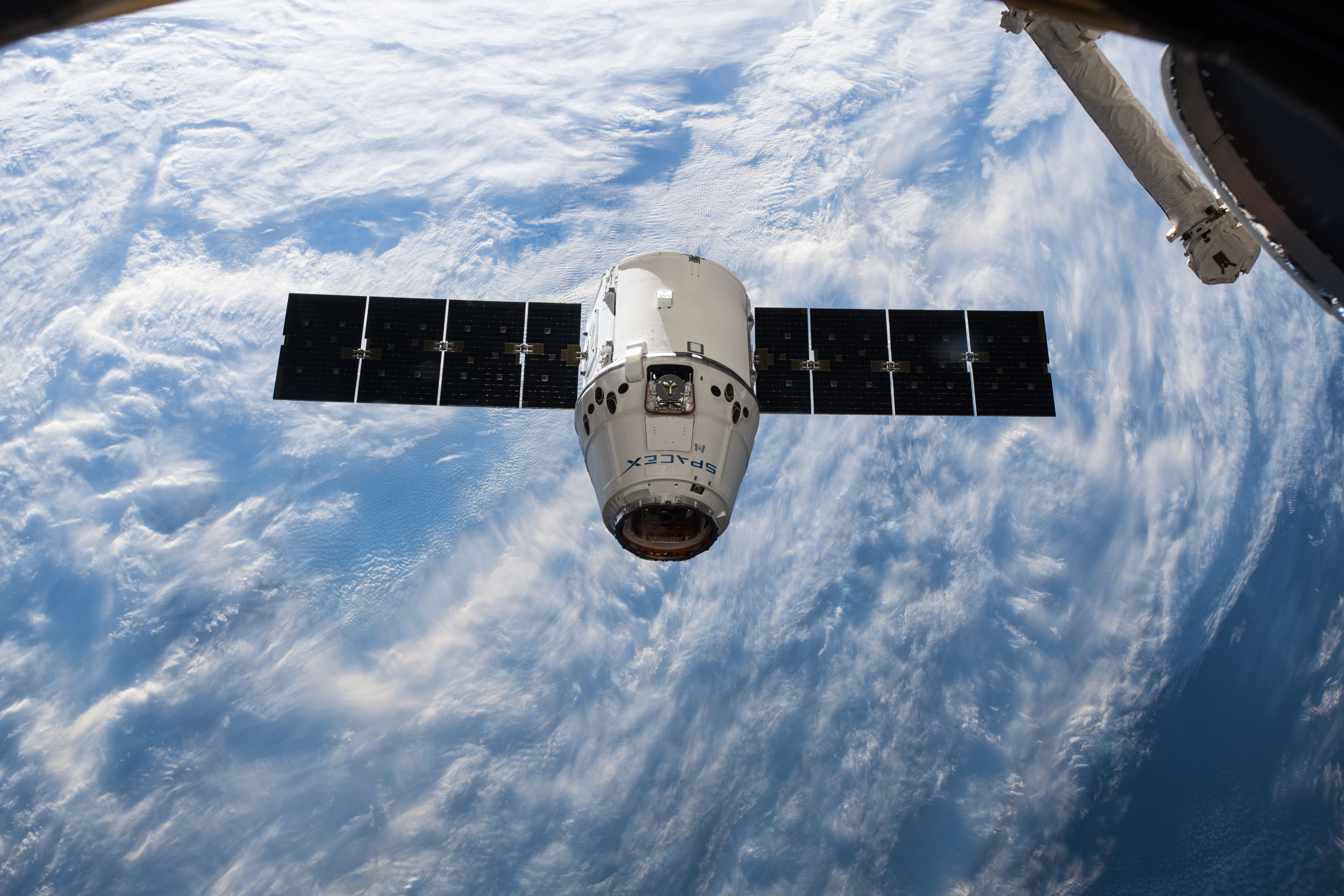
Dragon approaching the ISS

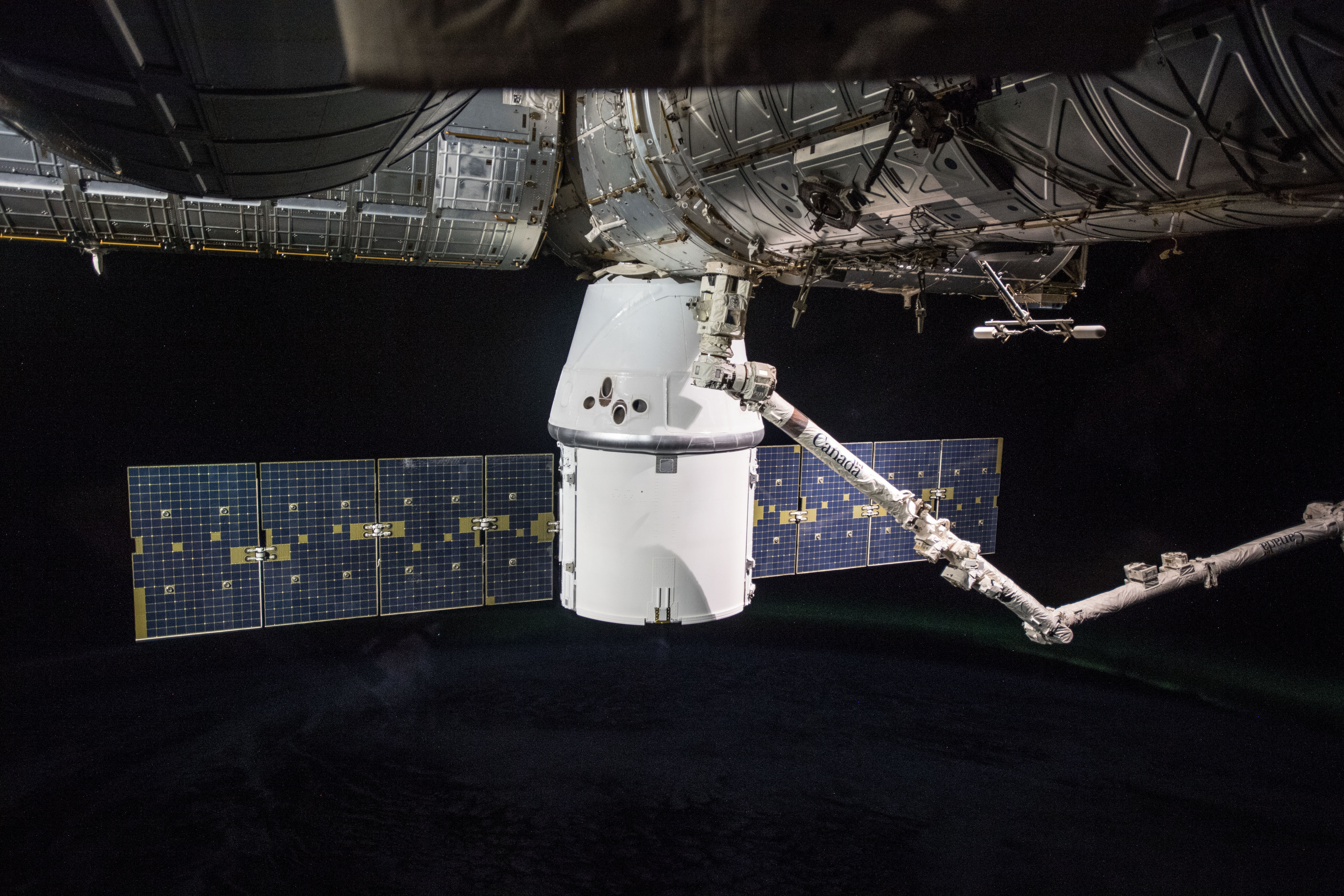
Dragon docked to the ISS

== See also ==
- Uncrewed spaceflights to the International Space Station
- List of Falcon 9 and Falcon Heavy launches
- 2018 in spaceflight
