= 2017 in spaceflight =

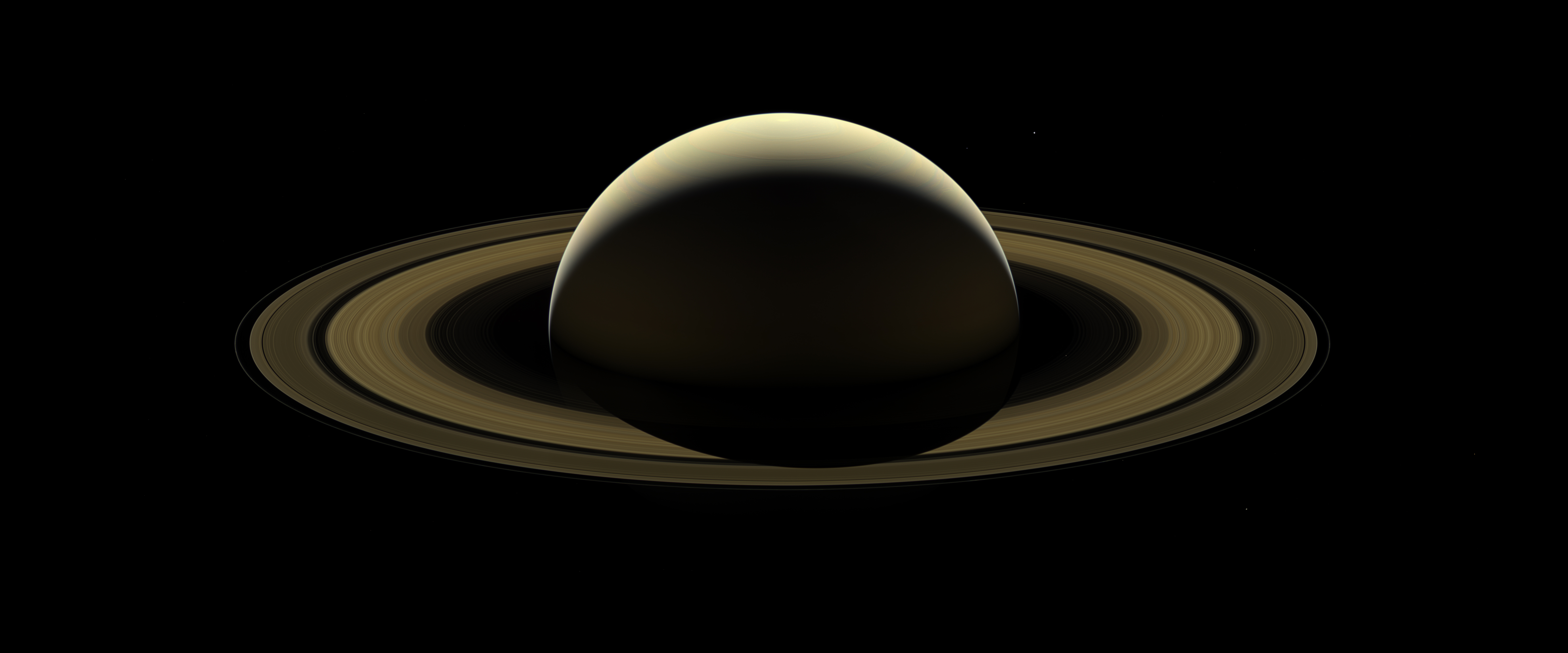
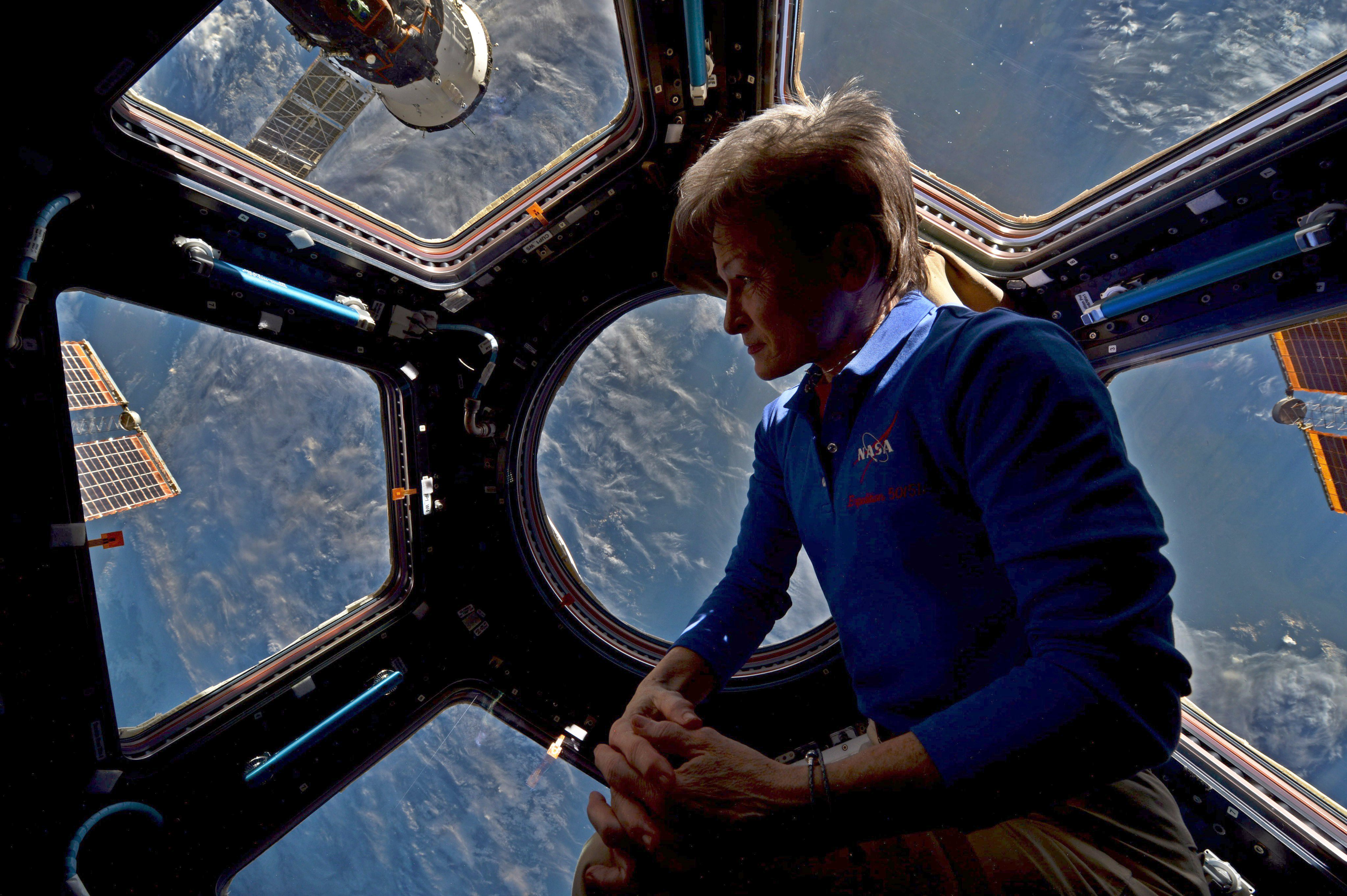
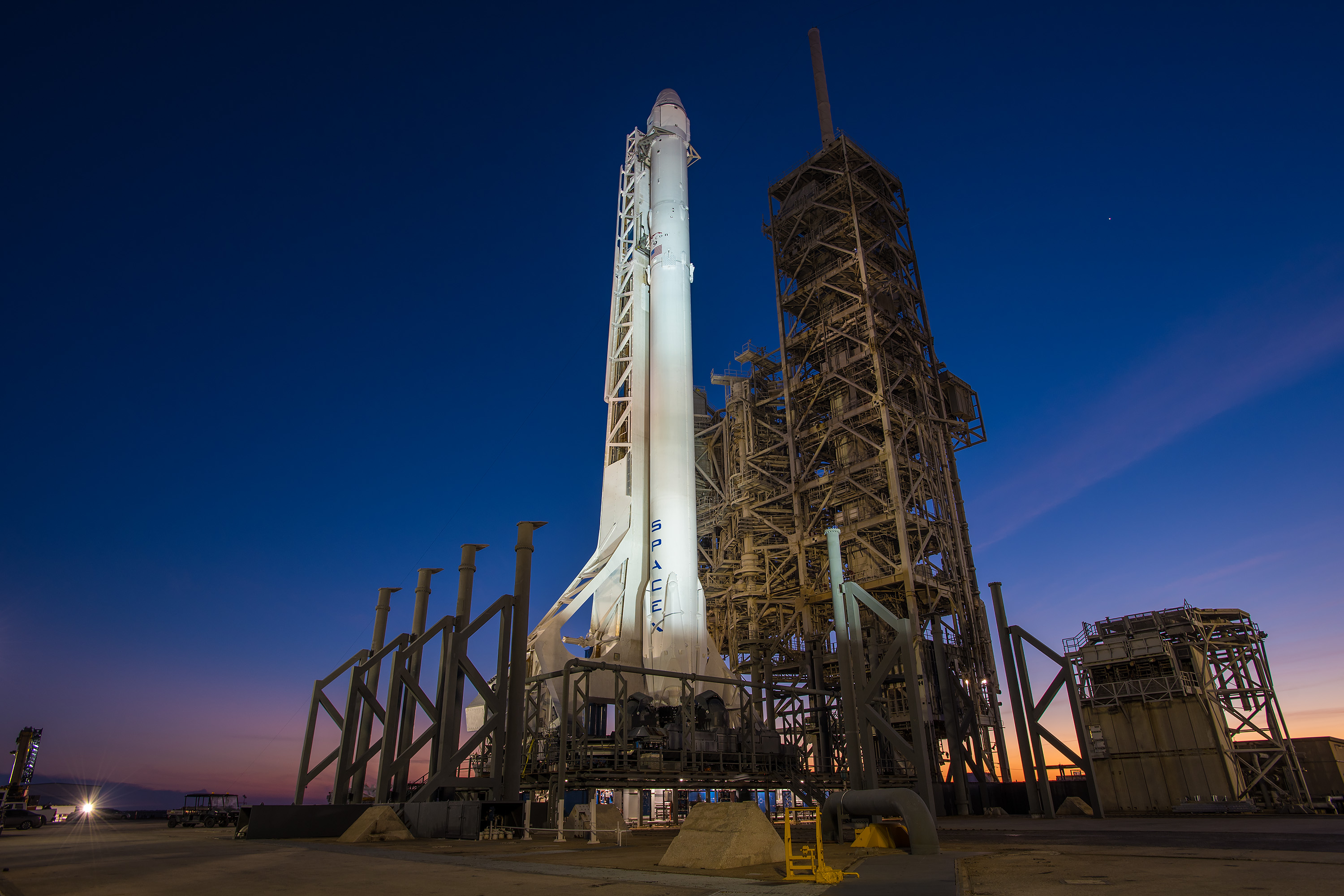
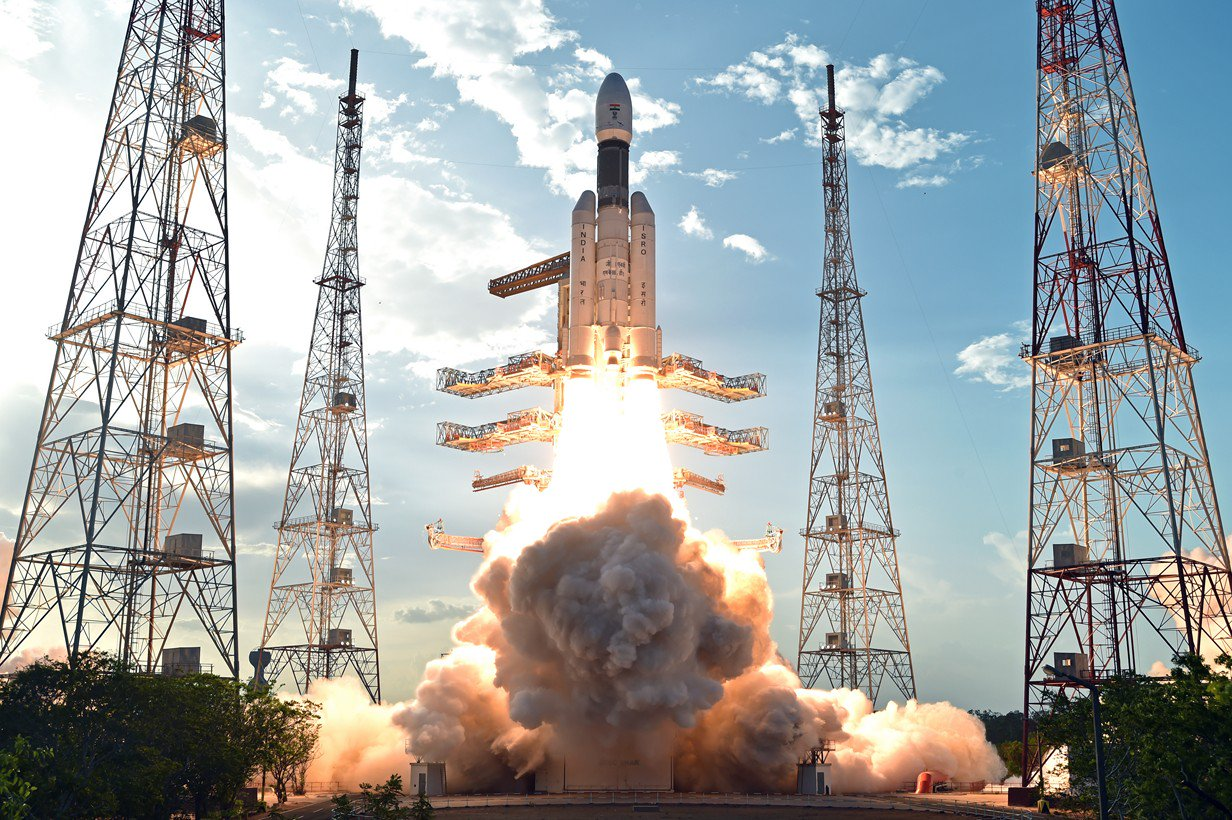
- Highlights from spaceflight in 2017 (Note: Clockwise from top: Cassini's final mosaic portrait of Saturn. The spacecraft was intentionally deorbited into the planet's atmosphere a few days after this mosaic was taken in September, ending its nearly 20-year mission.; A Falcon 9 awaits its first ever launch from the Kennedy Space Center, prior to Falcon 9 Flight 30 in February. It was the first launch to occur from Kennedy since STS-135 in July 2011.; The first orbital flight of the LVM3, during LVM3 D1 in June. The launch vehicle will eventually carry the Gaganyaan crewed spacecraft in the 2020s as part of the Indian Human Spaceflight Programme.; Astronaut Peggy Whitson aboard the International Space Station in August, during Expedition 52. It was during this expedition that she broke the records for the longest single spaceflight by a woman, and the longest cumulative days spent in space by an American.)

Orbital launches
- First: 5 January
- Last: 26 December
- Total: 91
- Successes: 83
- Failures: 6
- Partial failures: 2
- Catalogued: 86

National firsts
- Satellite: Bangladesh; Finland; Ghana; Latvia; Mongolia; Slovakia; Angola

Rockets
- Maiden flights: SS-520; Kaituozhe-2; Kuaizhou 1A; Electron; LVM3; Simorgh; Vector-R; Falcon 9 Block 4
- Retirements: Soyuz-U; Delta II 7920; Zenit-3F

Crewed flights
- Orbital: 4
- Total travellers: 11
- EVAs: 10

2017 in spaceflight

Notable spaceflight activities in 2017 included the maiden orbital flight of India's Geosynchronous Satellite Launch Vehicle Mark III (also called LVM3) on 5 June and the first suborbital test of Rocket Lab's Electron rocket, inaugurating the Mahia spaceport in New Zealand. The rocket is named for its innovative Rutherford engine which feeds propellants via battery-powered electric motors instead of the usual gas generator and turbopumps.

== Overview ==
China launched its new missile-derived Kaituozhe-2 variant on 2 March. The Japanese SS-520, a suborbital sounding rocket modified for orbital flight, failed to reach orbit in January. If successful, it would have become the smallest and lightest vehicle to ever put an object in orbit.

The venerable Russian Soyuz-U workhorse was retired after its 786th mission on 22 February. On 30 March, the SES-10 mission was launched with a previously flown Falcon 9 first stage, achieving a key milestone in the SpaceX reusable launch system development program; several other Falcon 9 first-stage boosters were re-used since then.

After a record-breaking 13-year mission observing Saturn, its rings and moons, the Cassini space probe was deliberately destroyed by plunging into Saturn's atmosphere, on 15 September 2017.

A record number of 466 satellites were attempted to be launched thanks to an increase in the number of small satellites. 289 of all satellites weighted less than 10 kg. The number of small satellites launched exceeded even the most optimistic forecasts.

== Orbital launches ==
- ← Jan
- Feb
- Mar
- Apr
- May
- Jun
- Jul
- Aug
- Sep
- Oct
- Nov
- Dec →

Date and time (UTC)	Rocket	Flight number	Launch site		LSP	
Date and time (UTC)	Payload (⚀ = CubeSat)	Operator	Orbit	Function	Decay (UTC)	Outcome
Date and time (UTC)	Remarks					
=== January ===
5 January; 15:18	(China) Long March 3B/E	3B-Y39	(China) Xichang LC-2		(China) CASC	
5 January; 15:18	(China) TJS-2	CNSA	Geosynchronous	Communications	In orbit	Operational
9 January; 04:11:12	(China) Kuaizhou 1A		(China) Jiuquan LS-95A		(China) CASIC	
9 January; 04:11:12	(China) Jilin-1 Video-03 (Lingqiao 1-03)	Chang Guang Satellite Technology	Low Earth (SSO)	Earth observation	In orbit	Operational
9 January; 04:11:12	(China) Caton-1	CNSA	Low Earth (SSO)	Earth observation	In orbit	Operational
9 January; 04:11:12	(China) Xingyun Shiyan 1	CNSA	Low Earth (SSO)	Earth observation	In orbit	Operational
14 January; 17:54:39	(United States) Falcon 9 Full Thrust	F9-029	(United States) Vandenberg SLC-4E		(United States) SpaceX	
14 January; 17:54:39	(United States) Iridium NEXT 1–10	Iridium	Low Earth	Communications	In orbit	Operational
14 January; 17:54:39	Return to flight mission for Falcon 9 after an accident in September 2016. First stage landed on a drone ship.					
14 January; 23:33	(Japan) SS-520		(Japan) Uchinoura		(Japan) JAXA	
14 January; 23:33	(Japan) TRICOM-1	University of Tokyo	Low Earth	Technology demonstration	14 January	Launch failure
14 January; 23:33	Contact lost at +20 sec after launch. Aborted ignition of 2nd stage.					
21 January; 00:42	(United States) Atlas V 401	AV-066	(United States) Cape Canaveral SLC-41		(United States) United Launch Alliance	
21 January; 00:42	(United States) USA-273 / SBIRS GEO-3	US Air Force	Geosynchronous	Missile warning	In orbit	Operational
24 January; 07:44	(Japan) H-IIA 204	F32	(Japan) Tanegashima LA-Y1		(Japan) MHI	
24 January; 07:44	(Japan) DSN-2	DSN / JSDF	Geosynchronous	Communications (military)	In orbit	Operational
28 January; 01:03:34	(Russia) Soyuz ST-B / Fregat-MT		(France) Kourou ELS		(France) Arianespace	
28 January; 01:03:34	(Spain) Hispasat AG1	Hispasat	Geosynchronous	Communications	In orbit	Operational
28 January; 01:03:34	First GTO launch by Soyuz at the Guiana Space Centre					
← Jan; Feb; Mar; Apr; May; Jun; Jul; Aug; Sep; Oct; Nov; Dec →; === February ===
14 February; 21:39	(France) Ariane 5 ECA	VA235	(France) Kourou ELA-3		(France) Arianespace	
14 February; 21:39	(United States) Intelsat 32e / (Brazil) SkyBrasil-1	Intelsat / SKY Brasil	Geosynchronous	Communications	In orbit	Operational
14 February; 21:39	(Indonesia) Telkom-3S	Telkom	Geosynchronous	Communications	In orbit	Operational
15 February; 03:58	(India) PSLV-XL	C37	(India) Satish Dhawan FLP		(India) ISRO	
15 February; 03:58	(India) Cartosat-2D	ISRO	Low Earth (SSO)	Earth observation	In orbit	Operational
15 February; 03:58	(India) INS-1A, 1B	ISRO	Low Earth (SSO)	Technology demonstration	INS-1A: 3 October 2023; INS-1B: 15 February 2017	Successful
15 February; 03:58	⚀ (Kazakhstan) Al-Farabi 1	KazGU	Low Earth (SSO)	Technology demonstration	25 July 2023	Successful
15 February; 03:58	⚀ (Israel) BGUSAT	Ben Gurion University	Low Earth (SSO)	Technology demonstration	24 February 2023	Successful
15 February; 03:58	⚀ (Switzerland) DIDO-2	SpacePharma	Low Earth (SSO)	Microgravity research	12 July 2024	Successful
15 February; 03:58	⚀ (United States) Flock-3p × 88	Planet Labs	Low Earth (SSO)	Earth observation	First: 28 October 2022; Last: 26 July 2023	Operational (1 of 88)
15 February; 03:58	⚀ (United States) Lemur-2 × 8	Spire Global	Low Earth (SSO)	Earth observation	First: 17 May 2023; Last: 29 November 2023	Successful
15 February; 03:58	⚀ (United Arab Emirates) Nayif 1	EIAST/AUS	Low Earth (SSO)	Technology demonstration	20 July 2023	Successful
15 February; 03:58	⚀ (Israel) / (Germany) / (Netherlands) / (Belgium) PEASS	PEASS Consortium	Low Earth (SSO)	Technology demonstration	1 December 2023	Successful
15 February; 03:58	Second largest number of satellites launched on a single rocket (104).					
19 February; 14:38:59	(United States) Falcon 9 Full Thrust	F9-030	(United States) Kennedy LC-39A		(United States) SpaceX	
19 February; 14:38:59	(United States) SpaceX CRS-10	NASA	Low Earth (ISS)	ISS logistics	19 March 2017; 14:46	Successful
19 February; 14:38:59	First SpaceX launch from LC-39A. Carries the SAGE III and Lightning Imaging Sensor (LIS) Earth-observation instruments to the ISS. First stage returned to Landing Zone 1.					
22 February; 05:58	(Russia) Soyuz-U		(Kazakhstan) Baikonur Site 1/5		(Russia) Roscosmos	
22 February; 05:58	(Russia) Progress MS-05 / 66P	Roscosmos	Low Earth (ISS)	ISS logistics	20 July	Successful
22 February; 05:58	786th and final flight of Soyuz-U.					
← Jan; Feb; Mar; Apr; May; Jun; Jul; Aug; Sep; Oct; Nov; Dec →; === March ===
1 March; 17:50	(United States) Atlas V 401	AV-068	(United States) Vandenberg SLC-3E		(United States) United Launch Alliance	
1 March; 17:50	(United States) USA-274 / Intruder 8	NRO	Low Earth	Reconnaissance	In orbit	Operational
1 March; 17:50	NROL-79 mission.					
2 March; 23:53	(China) Kaituozhe-2		(China) Jiuquan		(China) CASIC	
2 March; 23:53	(China) Tiankun-1	CASIC	Low Earth (SSO)	Technology demonstration	7 July 2023	Successful
2 March; 23:53	Maiden flight.					
7 March; 01:49:24	(Italy) Vega		(France) Kourou ELV		(France) Arianespace	
7 March; 01:49:24	Sentinel-2B	ESA	Low Earth (SSO)	Earth observation	In orbit	Operational
16 March; 06:00	(United States) Falcon 9 Full Thrust	F9-031	(United States) Kennedy LC-39A		(United States) SpaceX	
16 March; 06:00	(United States) Echostar 23	EchoStar	Geosynchronous	Communications	In orbit	Operational
16 March; 06:00	Due to the satellite's heavy mass (~5,600 kg), the rocket flew in its expendable configuration and the first-stage booster was not recovered.					
17 March; 01:20:00	(Japan) H-IIA 202	F33	(Japan) Tanegashima LA-Y1		(Japan) MHI	
17 March; 01:20:00	(Japan) IGS-Radar 5	CSICE	Low Earth (SSO)	Reconnaissance	In orbit	Operational
19 March; 00:18	(United States) Delta IV M+(5,4)		(United States) Cape Canaveral SLC-37B		(United States) United Launch Alliance	
19 March; 00:18	(United States) USA-275 / WGS-9	US Air Force	Geosynchronous	Communications	In orbit	Operational
30 March; 22:27	(United States) Falcon 9 Full Thrust	F9-032	(United States) Kennedy LC-39A		(United States) SpaceX	
30 March; 22:27	(Luxembourg) SES-10	SES S.A.	Geosynchronous	Communications	In orbit	Operational
30 March; 22:27	First flight of a Falcon 9 re-used first stage. SpaceX recovered the stage again.					
← Jan; Feb; Mar; Apr; May; Jun; Jul; Aug; Sep; Oct; Nov; Dec →; === April ===
12 April; 11:04:04	(China) Long March 3B/E	3B-Y43	(China) Xichang LC-2		(China) CASC	
12 April; 11:04:04	(China) Shijian 13	CNSA	Geosynchronous	Communications; Technology demonstration	In orbit	Operational
18 April; 15:11	(United States) Atlas V 401	AV-070	(United States) Cape Canaveral SLC-41		(United States) United Launch Alliance	
18 April; 15:11	(United States) Cygnus CRS OA-7; SS John Glenn	NASA	Low Earth (ISS)	ISS logistics	12 June 2017	Successful
18 April; 15:11	⚀ (United States) Altair 1	Millennium Space Systems	Low Earth	Technology demonstration	In orbit	Operational
18 April; 15:11	⚀ (United States) IceCube	GSFC	Low Earth	Technology demonstration Atmospheric research	3 October 2018	Successful
18 April; 15:11	⚀ (United States) CSUNSat 1	CSUN	Low Earth	Technology demonstration	5 May 2019	Successful
18 April; 15:11	⚀ (United States) CXBN 2	MSU	Low Earth	X-ray astronomy	1 March 2019	Successful
18 April; 15:11	⚀ (United States) / (Australia) / (Canada) / (United Kingdom) SHARC (Biarri-Point)	Project Biarri / AFRL	Low Earth	Technology demonstration	4 May 2019	Successful
18 April; 15:11	QB50 × 31	Various	Low Earth	Technology demonstration Atmospheric research	In orbit	Operational
18 April; 15:11	QB50 mission includes first Finnish satellite Aalto-2, Greek satellite UPSat					
20 April; 07:13:44	(Russia) Soyuz-FG		(Kazakhstan) Baikonur Site 1/5		(Russia) Roscosmos	
20 April; 07:13:44	(Russia) Soyuz MS-04 / 50S	Roscosmos	Low Earth (ISS)	Expedition 51/52	3 September 2017; 01:22	Successful
20 April; 07:13:44	Crewed flight with two cosmonauts.					
20 April; 11:41:35	(China) Long March 7	Y2	(China) Wenchang LC-2		(China) CASC	
20 April; 11:41:35	(China) Tianzhou 1	CMSA	Low Earth (Tiangong 2)	Tiangong 2 resupply	22 September 2017; 10:00	Successful
20 April; 11:41:35	(China) SilkRoad-1 / Silu 1	Xi'an Institute of Surveying and Mapping	Low Earth	Earth observation	In orbit	Operational
20 April; 11:41:35	SilkRoad-1 was released on 1 August from Tianzhou 1.					
← Jan; Feb; Mar; Apr; May; Jun; Jul; Aug; Sep; Oct; Nov; Dec →; === May ===
1 May; 11:15	(United States) Falcon 9 Full Thrust	F9-033	(United States) Kennedy LC-39A		(United States) SpaceX	
1 May; 11:15	(United States) NROL-76 / USA-276	NRO	Low Earth	Reconnaissance	In orbit	Operational
1 May; 11:15	First stage returned to Landing Zone 1.					
4 May; 21:50	(France) Ariane 5 ECA	VA236	(France) Kourou ELA-3		(France) Arianespace	
4 May; 21:50	(South Korea) Koreasat-7	KT Corporation	Geosynchronous	Communications	In orbit	Operational
4 May; 21:50	(Brazil) SGDC-1	Telebras	Geosynchronous	Communications	In orbit	Operational
5 May; 11:27	(India) GSLV Mk II	F09	(India) Satish Dhawan SLP		(India) ISRO	
5 May; 11:27	(India) GSAT-9	ISRO	Geosynchronous	Communications	In orbit	Operational
15 May; 23:21	(United States) Falcon 9 Full Thrust	F9-034	(United States) Kennedy LC-39A		(United States) SpaceX	
15 May; 23:21	(United Kingdom) Inmarsat-5 F4	Inmarsat	Geosynchronous	Communications	In orbit	Operational
15 May; 23:21	Due to the satellite's heavy mass (6,070 kg), the rocket flew in its expendable configuration and the first-stage booster was not recovered.					
18 May; 11:54:53	(Russia) Soyuz ST-A / Fregat-MT		(France) Kourou ELS		(France) Arianespace	
18 May; 11:54:53	(Luxembourg) SES-15	SES S.A.	Geosynchronous	Communications	In orbit	Operational
25 May; 04:20:00	(New Zealand) Electron	It's a Test	(New Zealand) Mahia LC-1A		(United States) Rocket Lab	
25 May; 04:20:00	(United States) It's a Test	Rocket Lab	Low Earth	Rocket stage / Flight test	25 May	Launch failure
25 May; 04:20:00	First Electron launch. Flight terminated by range safety at an altitude of 224 kilometres (139 mi) due to an error in ground tracking equipment. Carried instruments on the upper stage rather than a payload.					
25 May; 06:33	(Russia) Soyuz-2.1b / Fregat-M		(Russia) Plesetsk Site 43/4		(Russia) RVSN RF	
25 May; 06:33	(Russia) EKS-2	VKS	Molniya	Missile early warning	In orbit	Operational
← Jan; Feb; Mar; Apr; May; Jun; Jul; Aug; Sep; Oct; Nov; Dec →; === June ===
1 June; 00:17:46	(Japan) H-IIA 202	F34	(Japan) Tanegashima LA-Y1		(Japan) MHI	
1 June; 00:17:46	(Japan) QZS-2 (Michibiki 2)	CAO	Tundra/Quasi-Zenith Orbit	Navigation	In orbit	Operational
1 June; 23:45	(France) Ariane 5 ECA	VA237	(France) Kourou ELA-3		(France) Arianespace	
1 June; 23:45	(United States) ViaSat-2	ViaSat	Geosynchronous	Communications	In orbit	Operational
1 June; 23:45	(France) Eutelsat 172B	Eutelsat	Geosynchronous	Communications	In orbit	Operational
1 June; 23:45	This mission carried the heaviest and most expensive commercial payload ever launched, valued at $800 million with a combined payload mass of 9,969 kg for both satellites (10,865 kg total launch mass with dual-deployment hardware).					
3 June; 21:07	(United States) Falcon 9 Full Thrust	F9-035	(United States) Kennedy LC-39A		(United States) SpaceX	
3 June; 21:07	(United States) SpaceX CRS-11	NASA	Low Earth (ISS)	ISS logistics	3 July 2017	Successful
3 June; 21:07	(United States) NICER	NASA	Low Earth (ISS)	X-ray astronomy	In orbit	Operational
3 June; 21:07	⚀ (Bangladesh) BRAC ONNESHA	BRACU	Low Earth	Technology demonstration	6 May 2019	Successful
3 June; 21:07	⚀ (Ghana) GhanaSat-1	All Nations University	Low Earth	Technology demonstration	22 May 2019	Successful
3 June; 21:07	⚀ (Mongolia) Mazaalai	National University of Mongolia	Low Earth	Technology demonstration	11 May 2019	Successful
3 June; 21:07	⚀ Nigeria EduSat-1	FUTA	Low Earth	Technology demonstration	13 May 2019	Successful
3 June; 21:07	⚀ (Japan) TOKI	KIT	Low Earth	Technology demonstration	3 May 2019	Successful
3 June; 21:07	First stage returned to Landing Zone 1. TOKI, GhanaSat-1, Mazaalai, BRAC ONNESHA, and Nigeria EduSat-1 were carried to ISS as the cargo of SpaceX CRS-11 and deployed into orbit on 7 July 2017. 100th rocket launch from LC-39A.					
5 June; 11:58	(India) GSLV Mk III	D1	(India) Satish Dhawan SLP		(India) ISRO	
5 June; 11:58	(India) GSAT-19	ISRO	Geosynchronous	Communications	In orbit	Operational
5 June; 11:58	Maiden orbital flight.					
8 June; 03:45	(Russia) Proton-M / Briz-M	935-61	(Kazakhstan) Baikonur Site 81/24		(Russia) (United States) International Launch Services	
8 June; 03:45	(United States) Echostar 21	EchoStar	Geosynchronous	Communications	In orbit	Operational
14 June; 09:20	(Russia) Soyuz-2.1a		(Kazakhstan) Baikonur Site 31/6		(Russia) Roscosmos	
14 June; 09:20	(Russia) Progress MS-06 / 67P	Roscosmos	Low Earth (ISS)	ISS logistics	28 December	Successful
14 June; 09:20	(Russia) Sfera-53 2		Low Earth	Radar calibration target	29 November 2018	Successful
14 June; 09:20	(Russia) Tanyusha-YuZGU 1	South-West State University	Low Earth	Technology demonstration	30 July 2019	Successful
14 June; 09:20	(Russia) Tanyusha-YuZGU 2	South-West State University	Low Earth	Technology demonstration	8 September 2019	Successful
14 June; 09:20	(Russia) TNS-0 2	RISDE	Low Earth	Technology demonstration	15 October 2019	Successful
14 June; 09:20	Tanyusha-YuZGU, Sfera-53 2, TNS-O No. 2 were small satellites deployed into orbit from the ISS by cosmonauts during an EVA on 17 August 2017.					
15 June; 03:15	(China) Long March 4B	4B-Y31	(China) Jiuquan SLS-2		(China) CASC	
15 June; 03:15	(China) HXMT	CAS / IHEP	Low Earth (SSO)	X-ray astronomy	In orbit	Operational
15 June; 03:15	(China) Zhuhai-1 01	Zhuhai Orbital Control Engineering	Low Earth (SSO)	Earth observation	In orbit	Operational
15 June; 03:15	(China) Zhuhai-1 02	Zhuhai Orbital Control Engineering	Low Earth (SSO)	Earth observation	In orbit	Operational
15 June; 03:15	(Argentina) ÑuSat 3	Satellogic	Low Earth (SSO)	Earth observation	In orbit	Operational
15 June; 03:15	(China) CAS-4A	CNSA	Low Earth (SSO)	Communications	In orbit	Operational
15 June; 03:15	(China) CAS-4B	CNSA	Low Earth (SSO)	Communications	In orbit	Operational
18 June; 16:12	(China) Long March 3B/E	3B-Y28	(China) Xichang LC-2		(China) CASC	
18 June; 16:12	(China) ChinaSat 9A (Zhongxing-9A)	China Satcom	Geosynchronous (intended)	Communications	In orbit	Partial launch failure Operational
18 June; 16:12	Payload was inserted into a wrong orbit. After 16 days of orbit raising maneuvers, the satellite raised its orbit from 16,420 km to 36,000 km, and corrected its longitude to 101.4°E.					
23 June; 03:59	(India) PSLV-XL	C38	(India) Satish Dhawan FLP		(India) ISRO	
23 June; 03:59	(India) Cartosat-2E	ISRO	Low Earth (SSO)	Earth observation	In orbit	Operational
23 June; 03:59	(Japan) CE-SAT 1	Canon	Low Earth (SSO)	Earth observation	In orbit	Successful
23 June; 03:59	(Italy) Max Valier Sat	Max Valier school, Bozen	Low Earth (SSO)	X-ray astronomy Technology demonstration	In orbit	Operational
23 June; 03:59	(India) NIUSAT	Noorul Islam University	Low Earth (SSO)	Earth observation	In orbit	Operational
23 June; 03:59	(Latvia) Venta-1	Ventspils University College	Low Earth (SSO)	AIS ship tracking	In orbit	Operational
23 June; 03:59	⚀ (Finland) Aalto-1	Aalto University	Low Earth (SSO)	Earth observation	In orbit	Operational
23 June; 03:59	⚀ (United States) (Australia) (Israel) Blue Diamond	Sky and Space Global	Low Earth (SSO)	Communications	In orbit	Operational
23 June; 03:59	⚀ (United States) (Australia) (Israel) Green Diamond	Sky and Space Global	Low Earth (SSO)	Communications	In orbit	Operational
23 June; 03:59	⚀ (United States) (Australia) (Israel) Red Diamond	Sky and Space Global	Low Earth (SSO)	Communications	In orbit	Operational
23 June; 03:59	⚀ (United States) CICERO-6	GeoOptics Inc	Low Earth (SSO)	Technology demonstration	In orbit	Operational
23 June; 03:59	⚀ (Germany) COMPASS-2	FH Aachen	Low Earth (SSO)	Technology demonstration	In orbit	Operational
23 June; 03:59	⚀ (Italy) D-SAT	D-Orbit	Low Earth (SSO)	Technology demonstration	In orbit	Operational
23 June; 03:59	⚀ (United Kingdom) InflateSail	University of Surrey	Low Earth (SSO)	Technology demonstration	3 September 2017; 01:27	Successful
23 June; 03:59	⚀ (United States) Lemur-2 × 8	Spire Global	Low Earth (SSO)	Earth observation	In orbit	Operational
23 June; 03:59	⚀ (Lithuania) LituanicaSAT-2	Vilnius University	Low Earth (SSO)	Technology demonstration	In orbit	Operational
23 June; 03:59	⚀ (China) NUDTSat	NUDT	Low Earth (SSO)	Ionosphere research	In orbit	Operational
23 June; 03:59	⚀ (Austria) Pegasus	FH Wiener Neustadt	Low Earth (SSO)	Thermosphere research	In orbit	Operational
23 June; 03:59	⚀ (France) ROBUSTA-1B	University of Montpellier	Low Earth (SSO)	Technology demonstration	In orbit	Operational
23 June; 03:59	⚀ (Slovakia) skCUBE	University of Zilina	Low Earth (SSO)	Technology demonstration	In orbit	Operational
23 June; 03:59	⚀ (Chile) SUCHAI-1	University of Chile	Low Earth (SSO)	Ionosphere research	In orbit	Operational
23 June; 03:59	⚀ (United States) Tyvak-53b	Tyvak Nano-Satellite Systems	Low Earth (SSO)	Technology demonstration	14 March 2023	Successful
23 June; 03:59	⚀ (United Kingdom) UCLSat	University College London	Low Earth (SSO)	Ionosphere research	In orbit	Operational
23 June; 03:59	⚀ (Italy) URSA MAIOR	Sapienza University	Low Earth (SSO)	Thermosphere research	In orbit	Operational
23 June; 03:59	⚀ (Czech Republic) VZLUSAT-1	VZLU AEROSPACE	Low Earth (SSO)	Thermosphere research	In orbit	Operational
23 June; 03:59	Venta-1 was the first Latvian satellite. COMPASS-2, InflateSail, LithuanicaSAT-2, NUDTSat, Pegasus, UCLSat, URSA MAIOR and VZLUSat-2 are part of the QB-50 project led by Von Karman Institute to create a network of cubesats conducting measurements of Earth's lower termosphere and ionosphere.					
23 June; 18:04	(Russia) Soyuz-2-1v / Volga		(Russia) Plesetsk Site 43/4		(Russia) RVSN RF	
23 June; 18:04	(Russia) Kosmos 2519	VKS	Low Earth	Geodesy	23 December 2021	Successful
23 June; 18:04	(Russia) Kosmos 2521	VKS	Low Earth	Technology demonstration	12 September 2019	Successful
23 June; 18:04	Napryazhenie / 14F150 / Nivelir. Kosmos 2521, also known as Sputnik Inspektor, was later deployed by Kosmos 2519.					
23 June; 19:10	(United States) Falcon 9 Full Thrust	F9-036	(United States) Kennedy LC-39A		(United States) SpaceX	
23 June; 19:10	(Bulgaria) BulgariaSat-1	Bulsatcom	Geosynchronous	Communications	In orbit	Operational
23 June; 19:10	Second flight of a Falcon 9 re-used first stage.					
25 June; 20:25:14	(United States) Falcon 9 Full Thrust	F9-037	(United States) Vandenberg SLC-4E		(United States) SpaceX	
25 June; 20:25:14	(United States) Iridium NEXT 11–20	Iridium	Low Earth	Communications	In orbit	Operational
28 June; 20:59	(France) Ariane 5 ECA	VA238	(France) Kourou ELA-3		(France) Arianespace	
28 June; 20:59	(United Kingdom) EuropaSat / (Greece) Hellas Sat 3	Inmarsat	Geosynchronous	Communications	In orbit	Operational
28 June; 20:59	(India) GSAT-17	ISRO	Geosynchronous	Communications	In orbit	Operational
← Jan; Feb; Mar; Apr; May; Jun; Jul; Aug; Sep; Oct; Nov; Dec →; === July ===
2 July; 11:23:23	(China) Long March 5	Y2	(China) Wenchang LC-1		(China) CASC	
2 July; 11:23:23	(China) Shijian 18	CAST	Geosynchronous	Communications; Technology demonstration	2 July 2017	Launch failure
2 July; 11:23:23	The cause of the failure was confirmed by CASC later, related to the anomaly happened on one of the YF-77 engine in the first stage.					
5 July; 23:38	(United States) Falcon 9 Full Thrust	F9-038	(United States) Kennedy LC-39A		(United States) SpaceX	
5 July; 23:38	(United States) Intelsat 35e	Intelsat	Geosynchronous	Communications	In orbit	Operational
5 July; 23:38	Due to the satellite's heavy mass (6,761 kg), the rocket flew in its expendable configuration and the first-stage booster was not recovered.					
14 July; 06:36:49	(Russia) Soyuz-2.1a / Fregat-M		(Kazakhstan) Baikonur Site 31/6		(Russia) Roscosmos	
14 July; 06:36:49	(Russia) Kanopus-V-IK	Roscosmos	Low Earth (SSO)	Earth observation	In orbit	Operational
14 July; 06:36:49	(United States) CICERO × 3	GeoOptics	Low Earth (SSO)	Earth observation	In orbit	Operational
14 July; 06:36:49	(Germany) Flying Laptop	Institute of Space Systems	Low Earth (SSO)	Technology demonstration	In orbit	Operational
14 July; 06:36:49	(Norway) NORSAT-1	Norsk Romsenter	Low Earth (SSO)	Technology demonstration	In orbit	Operational
14 July; 06:36:49	(Norway) NORSAT-2	Norsk Romsenter	Low Earth (SSO)	Technology demonstration	In orbit	Operational
14 July; 06:36:49	(Germany) TechnoSat	TU Berlin	Low Earth (SSO)	Technology demonstration	In orbit	Operational
14 July; 06:36:49	(Japan) WNISAT-1R	Weathernews	Low Earth (SSO)	Earth observation	In orbit	Operational
14 July; 06:36:49	⚀ (United States) Corvus-BC 1, 2 (Lanmapper-BC 1, 2)	Astro Digital	Low Earth (SSO)	Earth observation	In orbit	Failure
14 July; 06:36:49	⚀ / (Russia) Ecuador-UTE-YuZGU	UTE / YuZGU	Low Earth (SSO)	Technology demonstration	In orbit	Operational
14 July; 06:36:49	⚀ (United States) Flock-2k × 48	Planet Labs	Low Earth (SSO)	Earth observation	In orbit	Operational
14 July; 06:36:49	⚀ (Russia) Iskra-MAI-85	MAI	Low Earth (SSO)	Technology demonstration	In orbit	Operational
14 July; 06:36:49	⚀ (United States) Lemur-2 × 8	Spire Global	Low Earth (SSO)	Earth observation	In orbit	Operational
14 July; 06:36:49	⚀ (Russia) Mayak	MPU	Low Earth (SSO)	Technology demonstration	In orbit	Partial failure
14 July; 06:36:49	⚀ (Russia) MKA-N × 2	Roscosmos / Dauria Aerospace	Low Earth (SSO)	Earth observation	In orbit	Failure
14 July; 06:36:49	⚀ (United States) NanoACE	Tyvak Nano-Satellite Systems	Low Earth (SSO)	Technology demonstration	In orbit	Operational
14 July; 06:36:49	Delivery of 73 satellites in three orbital altitudes with a single launch. Some cubesats were deployed into unintended orbit or having communication problem. Mayak fails to deploy solar reflector. Glavcosmos has later confirmed upper stage anomaly during the launch.					
27 July	(Iran) Simorgh		(Iran) Semnan		(Iran) ISA	
27 July		ISA	Low Earth		27 July 2017	Launch failure
27 July	The first orbital attempt for Simorgh. Iranian official sources state that the rocket has reached orbit. U.S. Strategic Command confirmed that no satellite deployed from the rocket as the rocket suffered a "catastrophic failure" shortly after liftoff. The U.S. Air Force's Joint Space Operations Center at Vandenberg Air Force Base reported that it had not detected any satellite released into low-Earth orbit by the Simorgh SLV. Finally, the United States, France, Germany and Britain have condemned Iran's test of a satellite-launching rocket.					
28 July; 15:41	(Russia) Soyuz-FG		(Kazakhstan) Baikonur Site 1/5		(Russia) Roscosmos	
28 July; 15:41	(Russia) Soyuz MS-05 / 51S	Roscosmos	Low Earth (ISS)	Expedition 52/53	14 December 2017; 08:48	Successful
28 July; 15:41	Crewed flight with three cosmonauts.					
← Jan; Feb; Mar; Apr; May; Jun; Jul; Aug; Sep; Oct; Nov; Dec →; === August ===
2 August; 01:58	(Italy) Vega		(France) Kourou ELV		(France) Arianespace	
2 August; 01:58	(Italy) OPTSAT-3000	Italian Defense Ministry	Low Earth (SSO)	IMINT (Reconnaissance)	In orbit	Operational
2 August; 01:58	(Israel) / (France) VENμS	ISA / CNES	Low Earth (SSO)	Earth observation	In orbit	Operational
14 August; 16:31	(United States) Falcon 9 Block 4	F9-039	(United States) Kennedy LC-39A		(United States) SpaceX	
14 August; 16:31	(United States) SpaceX CRS-12	NASA	Low Earth (ISS)	ISS logistics	17 September 2017	Successful
14 August; 16:31	⚀ (United States) OSIRIS-3U	Penn State	Low Earth	Space weather	7 March 2019	Successful
14 August; 16:31	(United States) Kestrel Eye 2M	U.S. Army	Low Earth	Reconnaissance	28 August 2021	Successful
14 August; 16:31	⚀ (United States) Dellingr/RBLE	GSFC	Low Earth	Technology demonstration / Heliophysics	In orbit	Operational
14 August; 16:31	⚀ (United States) ASTERIA	MIT/JPL	Low Earth	Technology demonstration	In orbit	Successful
14 August; 16:31	First flight of Falcon 9 "block 4" upgrade. Last flight of a newly-built Dragon capsule; further missions will use refurbished spacecraft. Carried cosmic-ray detector ISS-CREAM to be installed on the station, and several cubesats to be later deployed from the ISS. Kestrel Eye was deployed into orbit from ISS on 24 October 2017. ASTERIA and Dellingr/RBLE were deployed on 20 November 2017, and OSIRIS-3U was deployed on 21 November 2017.					
16 August; 22:07	(Russia) Proton-M / Briz-M	?	(Kazakhstan) Baikonur Site 81/24		(Russia) RVSN RF	
16 August; 22:07	(Russia) Blagovest-11L	VKS	Geosynchronous	Communications (military)	In orbit	Operational
18 August; 12:29	(United States) Atlas V 401	AV-074	(United States) Cape Canaveral SLC-41		(United States) United Launch Alliance	
18 August; 12:29	(United States) TDRS-M	NASA	Geosynchronous	Communications	In orbit	Operational
19 August; 05:29	(Japan) H-IIA 204	F35	(Japan) Tanegashima LA-Y1		(Japan) MHI	
19 August; 05:29	(Japan) QZS-3	CAO	Geosynchronous	Navigation	In orbit	Operational
24 August; 18:50	(United States) Falcon 9 Full Thrust	F9-040	(United States) Vandenberg SLC-4E		(United States) SpaceX	
24 August; 18:50	(Taiwan) FormoSat-5	NSPO	Low Earth (SSO)	Earth observation	In orbit	Operational
26 August; 06:04	(United States) Minotaur IV / Orion 38		(United States) Cape Canaveral SLC-46		(United States) Orbital ATK	
26 August; 06:04	(United States) ORS-5	ORS	Low Earth	Space surveillance	In orbit	Operational
31 August; 13:30	(India) PSLV-XL	C39	(India) Satish Dhawan FLP		(India) ISRO	
31 August; 13:30	(India) IRNSS-1H	ISRO	Geosynchronous	Navigation	2 March 2019	Launch failure
31 August; 13:30	Payload fairing failed to separate, leaving the satellite adrift within the fairing after internally separating from the fourth stage of the rocket. The stage, along with IRNSS-1H, re-entered the atmosphere together on 2 March 2019.					
← Jan; Feb; Mar; Apr; May; Jun; Jul; Aug; Sep; Oct; Nov; Dec →; === September ===
7 September; 14:00	(United States) Falcon 9 Block 4	F9-041	(United States) Kennedy LC-39A		(United States) SpaceX	
7 September; 14:00	(United States) X-37B / OTV-5 / USA-277	U.S. Air Force	Low Earth	Technology demonstration (classified)	27 October 2019; 07:51	Successful
11 September; 19:23:41	(Russia) Proton-M / Briz-M	935-65	(Kazakhstan) Baikonur Site 200/39		(Russia) (United States) International Launch Services	
11 September; 19:23:41	(Spain) Amazonas 5	Hispasat	Geosynchronous	Communications	In orbit	Operational
12 September; 21:17:02	(Russia) Soyuz-FG		(Kazakhstan) Baikonur Site 1/5		(Russia) Roscosmos	
12 September; 21:17:02	(Russia) Soyuz MS-06 / 52S	Roscosmos	Low Earth (ISS)	Expedition 53/54	In orbit	Operational
12 September; 21:17:02	Crewed flight with three cosmonauts.					
22 September; 00:02:32	(Russia) Soyuz-2.1b / Fregat-M		(Russia) Plesetsk Site 43/4		(Russia) RVSN RF	
22 September; 00:02:32	(Russia) Kosmos 2522 / GLONASS-M 752	VKS	Medium Earth	Navigation	In orbit	Operational
24 September; 05:49:47	(United States) Atlas V 541	AV-072	(United States) Vandenberg SLC-3E		(United States) United Launch Alliance	
24 September; 05:49:47	(United States) NROL-42 / Trumpet / USA-278	NRO	Low Earth	Reconnaissance	In orbit	Operational
28 September; 18:52:16	(Russia) Proton-M / Briz-M	937-03	(Kazakhstan) Baikonur Site 200/39		(Russia) (United States) International Launch Services	
28 September; 18:52:16	(Hong Kong) AsiaSat 9	AsiaSat	Geosynchronous	Communications	In orbit	Operational
29 September; 04:21	(China) Long March 2C	2C-Y29	(China) Xichang LC-3		(China) CASC	
29 September; 04:21	(China) Yaogan-30 A	CAS	Low Earth	Technology demonstration	In orbit	Operational
29 September; 04:21	(China) Yaogan-30 B	CAS	Low Earth	Technology demonstration	In orbit	Operational
29 September; 04:21	(China) Yaogan-30 C	CAS	Low Earth	Technology demonstration	In orbit	Operational
29 September; 21:47	(France) Ariane 5 ECA	VA239	(France) Kourou ELA-3		(France) Arianespace	
29 September; 21:47	(United States) Intelsat 37e	Intelsat	Geosynchronous	Communications	In orbit	Operational
29 September; 21:47	(Japan) BSAT-4a	BSAT	Geosynchronous	Communications	In orbit	Operational
← Jan; Feb; Mar; Apr; May; Jun; Jul; Aug; Sep; Oct; Nov; Dec →; === October ===
9 October; 04:13	(China) Long March 2D	2D-Y30	(China) Jiuquan SLS-2		(China) CASC	
9 October; 04:13	(Venezuela) VRSS-2	ABAE / MPPCTII	Low Earth (SSO)	Earth observation	In orbit	Operational
9 October; 12:37	(United States) Falcon 9 Block 4	F9-042	(United States) Vandenberg SLC-4E		(United States) SpaceX	
9 October; 12:37	(United States) Iridium NEXT 21–30	Iridium	Low Earth	Communications	In orbit	Operational
9 October; 22:01:37	(Japan) H-IIA 202	F36	(Japan) Tanegashima LA-Y1		(Japan) MHI	
9 October; 22:01:37	(Japan) QZS-4	CAO	Tundra	Navigation	In orbit	Operational
11 October; 22:53	(United States) Falcon 9 Full Thrust	F9-043	(United States) Kennedy LC-39A		(United States) SpaceX	
11 October; 22:53	(Luxembourg) SES-11 / (United States) EchoStar 105	SES S.A. / EchoStar	Geosynchronous	Communications	In orbit	Operational
11 October; 22:53	Third time a Falcon 9 first stage is re-used.					
13 October; 09:27:44	(Russia) Rokot / Briz-KM		(Russia) Plesetsk Site 133/3		(France) / (Russia) Eurockot	
13 October; 09:27:44	Sentinel-5 Precursor	ESA	Low Earth (SSO)	Earth observation	In orbit	Operational
14 October; 08:46:53	(Russia) Soyuz-2.1a		(Kazakhstan) Baikonur Site 31/6		(Russia) Roscosmos	
14 October; 08:46:53	(Russia) Progress MS-07 / 68P	Roscosmos	Low Earth (ISS)	ISS logistics	26 April 2018	Successful
14 October; 08:46:53	(Russia) / (India) Iskra 5	Moscow Aviation Institute / Space Kidz India	Low Earth	Communications		
14 October; 08:46:53	Originally intended to debut a new two-orbit rendezvous profile, profile reverted to standard 34-orbit profile after the first launch attempt was scrubbed.					
15 October; 07:28	(United States) Atlas V 421	AV-075	(United States) Cape Canaveral SLC-41		(United States) United Launch Alliance	
15 October; 07:28	(United States) NROL-52 / Quasar 21 / USA-279	NRO	Geosynchronous (TBC)	Communications (military)	In orbit	Operational
30 October; 19:34	(United States) Falcon 9 Block 4	F9-044	(United States) Kennedy LC-39A		(United States) SpaceX	
30 October; 19:34	(South Korea) Koreasat 5A	KT Corporation	Geosynchronous	Communications	In orbit	Operational
31 October; 21:37	(United States) Minotaur-C		(United States) Vandenberg LC-576E		(United States) Orbital ATK	
31 October; 21:37	(United States) SkySat × 6	Terra Bella	Low Earth	Earth observation	In orbit	Operational
31 October; 21:37	⚀ (United States) Flock-3m × 4	Planet Labs	Low Earth	Earth observation	In orbit	Operational
31 October; 21:37	Return to flight mission for Minotaur-C after a failed launch in March 2011.					
← Jan; Feb; Mar; Apr; May; Jun; Jul; Aug; Sep; Oct; Nov; Dec →; === November ===
5 November; 11:45:00	(China) Long March 3B / YZ-1	3B-Y46	(China) Xichang		(China) CASC	
5 November; 11:45:00	(China) BeiDou-3 M1	CNSA	Medium Earth	Navigation	In orbit	Operational
5 November; 11:45:00	(China) BeiDou-3 M2	CNSA	Medium Earth	Navigation	In orbit	Operational
8 November; 01:42:30	(Italy) Vega		(France) Kourou ELV		(France) Arianespace	
8 November; 01:42:30	(Morocco) Mohammed VI-A (MN35-13)	Morocco	Low Earth	Earth observation	In orbit	Operational
12 November; 12:19:51	(United States) Antares 230		(United States) MARS LP-0A		(United States) Orbital ATK	
12 November; 12:19:51	(United States) Cygnus CRS OA-8E; SS Gene Cernan	NASA	Low Earth (ISS)	ISS logistics	18 December 2017	Successful
12 November; 12:19:51	⚀ (United States) AeroCube (OSCD) × 2	The Aerospace Corporation	Low Earth	Technology demonstration	5 August 2022 (OSCD B); 12 August 2022 (OSCD C)	Successful
12 November; 12:19:51	⚀ (United States) Asgardia-1	Asgardia	Low Earth	Technology demonstration	12 September 2022	Successful
12 November; 12:19:51	⚀ (United States) CHEFsat	NRL	Low Earth	Technology demonstration	2 January 2022	Successful
12 November; 12:19:51	⚀ (United States) EcAMSat	NASA	Low Earth	Microbiology	8 December 2021	Successful
12 November; 12:19:51	⚀ (United States) ISARA	JPL	Low Earth	Technology demonstration	In orbit	Operational
12 November; 12:19:51	⚀ (United States) Lemur-2 × 8	Spire Global	Low Earth	Earth observation	In orbit	Operational
12 November; 12:19:51	⚀ (United States) PropCube 2 (Fauna)	NPS	Low Earth	Technology demonstration	30 July 2022	Successful
12 November; 12:19:51	⚀ (United States) TechEdSat-6	SJSU/UI/NASA Ames	Low Earth	Technology demonstration	15 May 2018	Successful
12 November; 12:19:51	EcAMSat was deployed into orbit from ISS on 20 November 2017, and TechEdSat-6 was deployed on 21 November 2017. Other small satellites were deployed from Cygnus after it departed from ISS.					
14 November; 18:35	(China) Long March 4C	4C-Y21	(China) Taiyuan LA-9		(China) CAST	
14 November; 18:35	(China) Fengyun 3D	CMA	Low Earth (polar)	Meteorology	In orbit	Operational
14 November; 18:35	(China) HEAD-1	HEAD Aerospace	Low Earth (polar)	AIS ship tracking	In orbit	Operational
18 November; 09:47:36	(United States) Delta II 7920		(United States) Vandenberg SLC-2W		(United States) United Launch Alliance	
18 November; 09:47:36	(United States) NOAA-20	NOAA	Low Earth (SSO)	Meteorology	In orbit	Operational
18 November; 09:47:36	(Australia) Buccaneer RMM	UNSW, DSTO	Low Earth (SSO)	Technology demonstration	In orbit	Operational
18 November; 09:47:36	(United States) EagleSat	ERAU	Low Earth (SSO)	Education	In orbit	Operational
18 November; 09:47:36	(United States) MakerSat 0	NNU	Low Earth (SSO)	Technology demonstration	In orbit	Operational
18 November; 09:47:36	(United States) MiRaTA	MIT	Low Earth (SSO)	Earth observation	In orbit	Operational
18 November; 09:47:36	(United States) RadFxSat (Fox 1B)	AMSAT	Low Earth (SSO)	Technology demonstration	In orbit	Operational
18 November; 09:47:36	Last flight of the Delta II 7920 configuration, penultimate flight of Delta II					
21 November; 04:50	(China) Long March 6	Y2	(China) Taiyuan LA-16		(China) CASC	
21 November; 04:50	(China) Jilin-1 Video-04 (Lingqiao 1-04)	Chang Guang Satellite Technology	Low Earth (SSO)	Earth observation	In orbit	Operational
21 November; 04:50	(China) Jilin-1 Video-05 (Lingqiao 1-05)	Chang Guang Satellite Technology	Low Earth (SSO)	Earth observation	In orbit	Operational
21 November; 04:50	(China) Jilin-1 Video-06 (Lingqiao 1-06)	Chang Guang Satellite Technology	Low Earth (SSO)	Earth observation	In orbit	Operational
24 November; 18:10	(China) Long March 2C	2C-Y30	(China) Xichang		(China) CASC	
24 November; 18:10	(China) Yaogan 30-02A	CNSA	Low Earth	Reconnaissance	In orbit	Operational
24 November; 18:10	(China) Yaogan 30-02B	CNSA	Low Earth	Reconnaissance	In orbit	Operational
24 November; 18:10	(China) Yaogan 30-02C	CNSA	Low Earth	Reconnaissance	In orbit	Operational
28 November; 05:41:46	(Russia) Soyuz-2.1b / Fregat-M		(Russia) Vostochny Site 1S		(Russia) Roscosmos	
28 November; 05:41:46	(Russia) Meteor-M No. 2-1	Roscosmos	Low Earth (SSO)	Meteorology	28 November 2017	Launch failure
28 November; 05:41:46	(Norway) AISSat-3	NSC	Low Earth (SSO)	Traffic monitoring	28 November 2017	Launch failure
28 November; 05:41:46	(Russia) Baumanets 2	Bauman University	Low Earth (SSO)	Technology demonstration	28 November 2017	Launch failure
28 November; 05:41:46	(Japan) IDEA-OSG 1	Astroscale	Low Earth (SSO)	Technology demonstration	28 November 2017	Launch failure
28 November; 05:41:46	(Canada) LEO Vantage 2	TeleSat Canada	Low Earth (SSO)	Communications (experimental)	28 November 2017	Launch failure
28 November; 05:41:46	⚀ (United States) Corvus-BC 3	Astro Digital	Low Earth (SSO)	Earth observation	28 November 2017	Launch failure
28 November; 05:41:46	⚀ (Germany) D-Star One	German Orbital Systems	Low Earth (SSO)	Communications (experimental)	28 November 2017	Launch failure
28 November; 05:41:46	⚀ (United States) Lemur-2 × 10	Spire Global	Low Earth (SSO)	Earth observation	28 November 2017	Launch failure
28 November; 05:41:46	⚀ (Sweden) SEAM	Multiple users	Low Earth (SSO)	Technology demonstration	28 November 2017	Launch failure
28 November; 05:41:46	The Fregat upper stage suffered an apparent programming failure resulting in the loss of all 19 satellites.					
← Jan; Feb; Mar; Apr; May; Jun; Jul; Aug; Sep; Oct; Nov; Dec →; === December ===
2 December; 10:43:26	(Russia) Soyuz-2.1b		(Russia) Plesetsk		(Russia) RVSN RF	
2 December; 10:43:26	(Russia) Kosmos-2524 (Lotos No. 2 803)		Low Earth	ELINT	In orbit	Operational
3 December; 04:11	(China) Long March 2D	2D-Y47	(China) Jiuquan LC-43		(China) CASC	
3 December; 04:11	(China) LKW-1	CAS	Low Earth	Earth observation	In orbit	Operational
10 December; 16:41	(China) Long March 3B	3B-Y40	(China) Xichang LC-2		(China) CAST	
10 December; 16:41	(Algeria) Alcomsat-1	Algerian Space Agency	Geosynchronous	Communications	In orbit	Operational
10 December; 16:41	First Algerian geostationary communications satellite					
12 December; 18:36:07	(France) Ariane 5 ES	VA240	(France) Kourou ELA-3		(France) Arianespace	
12 December; 18:36:07	Galileo FOC 15-18	ESA	Medium Earth	Navigation	In orbit	Operational
12 December; 18:36:07	Second Galileo launch with Ariane 5 (9th overall), carrying Nicole, Zofia, Alexandre, and Irina.					
15 December; 15:36	(United States) Falcon 9 Full Thrust	F9-045	(United States) Cape Canaveral SLC-40		(United States) SpaceX	
15 December; 15:36	(United States) SpaceX CRS-13	NASA	Low Earth (ISS)	ISS logistics	13 January 2018	Successful
15 December; 15:36	Re-used the first-stage booster from CRS-11 (2017) and the Dragon capsule from CRS-6 (2015)					
17 December; 07:21	(Russia) Soyuz-FG		(Kazakhstan) Baikonur Site 1/5		(Russia) Roscosmos	
17 December; 07:21	(Russia) Soyuz MS-07 / 53S	Roscosmos	Low Earth (ISS)	Expedition 54/55	In orbit	Operational
17 December; 07:21	Crewed flight with three cosmonauts.					
23 December; 01:26:22	(Japan) H-IIA 202	F37	(Japan) Tanegashima LA-Y1		(Japan) MHI	
23 December; 01:26:22	(Japan) GCOM-C	JAXA	Low Earth (SSO)	Earth observation	In orbit	Operational
23 December; 01:26:22	(Japan) SLATS	JAXA	Low Earth	Atmospheric sciences Technology demonstration	1 October 2019	Successful
23 December; 01:27:23	(United States) Falcon 9 Full Thrust	F9-046	(United States) Vandenberg SLC-4E		(United States) SpaceX	
23 December; 01:27:23	(United States) Iridium NEXT 31–40	Iridium	Low Earth	Communications	In orbit	Operational
23 December; 01:27:23	Re-using a first-stage booster. This rocket flew in its expendable configuration so the first-stage booster was not recovered					
23 December; 04:14	(China) Long March 2D	2D-Y48	(China) Jiuquan LC-43		(China) CASC	
23 December; 04:14	(China) LKW-2	CAS	Low Earth	Earth observation	In orbit	Operational
25 December; 19:44	(China) Long March 2C	2C-Y34	(China) Xichang LC-3		(China) CASC	
25 December; 19:44	(China) Yaogan-30 G	CAS	Low Earth	Technology demonstration	In orbit	Operational
25 December; 19:44	(China) Yaogan-30 H	CAS	Low Earth	Technology demonstration	In orbit	Operational
25 December; 19:44	(China) Yaogan-30 J	CAS	Low Earth	Technology demonstration	In orbit	Operational
26 December; 19:00:03	(Ukraine) Zenit-3F / (Russia) Fregat-SB		(Kazakhstan) Baikonur Site 45/1		(Russia) S7 Space	
26 December; 19:00:03	(Angola) AngoSat 1	Republic of Angola	Geosynchronous	Communications	In orbit	Spacecraft failure
26 December; 19:00:03	First satellite of Angola. Launch was successful but contact was lost quickly afterwards. On 28 December 2017, communication was temporarily restored and telemetry was received.					
← Jan; Feb; Mar; Apr; May; Jun; Jul; Aug; Sep; Oct; Nov; Dec →

== Suborbital flights ==
Date and time (UTC)	Rocket	Flight number	Launch site		LSP	
Date and time (UTC)	Payload (⚀ = CubeSat)	Operator	Orbit	Function	Decay (UTC)	Outcome
Date and time (UTC)	Remarks					
15 January	(China) DF-5C		(China) Taiyuan Satellite Launch Center		(China) PLARF	
15 January		PLARF	Suborbital	Missile test	15 January	Successful
16 January	(Russia) RS-12M Topol		(Russia) Plesetsk		(Russia) RVSN	
16 January		RVSN	Suborbital	Missile test	16 January	Successful
23 January; 02:30	(Brazil) VSB-30		(Sweden) Esrange		(Germany) DLR / (Sweden) SSC	
23 January; 02:30	(Germany) / (Sweden) MAIUS-1	DLR / SSC	Suborbital	Microgravity	23 January	Successful
23 January; 02:30	Apogee: 238 kilometres (148 mi)					
24 January	(Pakistan) Ababeel		(Pakistan) ?		(Pakistan) ASFC	
24 January		ASFC	Suborbital	Missile test	24 January	Successful
25 January	(Israel) Black Sparrow		F-15 Eagle, Israel		(Israel) IAF	
25 January		IAI/IDF	Suborbital	Missile test target	25 January	Successful
25 January	DST-5 target, successfully intercepted					
25 January	(Israel) Stunner		(Israel) Palmachim Airbase		(Israel) IAF	
25 January		IAI/IDF	Suborbital	Missile test	25 January	Successful
25 January	DST-5 interceptor					
27 January; 13:45:00	(Canada) Black Brant IX		(United States) Poker Flat Research Range		(United States) NASA	
27 January; 13:45:00	(United States) PolarNOx	Virginia Tech	Suborbital	Thermosphere research	27 January	Successful
27 January; 13:45:00	Apogee: 283 kilometres (176 mi).					
29 January	(Iran) Khorramshahr		(Iran) Semnan		(Iran) AFIRI	
29 January		AFIRI	Suborbital	Missile test	29 January	Launch failure
29 January	The missile flew about 600 miles before exploding. Test of a reentry vehicle failed.					
4 February; 8:30:00	(United States) MRBM	SFTM-01	(United States) Pacific Missile Range Facility		(United States) MDA	
4 February; 8:30:00	(United States) SFTM-01 Target	MDA	Suborbital	ABM target	4 February	Successful
4 February; 8:30:00	Ballistic missile target for interception					
4 February; ~8:30:00	(United States) SM-3	SFTM-01	(United States) USS John Paul Jones, Kauai		(United States) MDA	
4 February; ~8:30:00	(United States) SFTM-01 Interceptor	MDA	Suborbital	ABM test	4 February	Successful
4 February; ~8:30:00	Ballistic missile interceptor					
9 February; 7:38:59	(United States) Minuteman-III		(United States) Vandenberg Air Force Base LF-10		(United States) US Air Force	
9 February; 7:38:59		US Air Force	Suborbital	Test flight	9 February	Successful
11 February; 22:55	(North Korea) Pukguksong-2		(North Korea) Kusong		(North Korea) Korean People's Army Strategic Force	
11 February; 22:55	(North Korea)	Korean People's Army Strategic Force	Suborbital	Missile test	11 February	Successful
11 February; 22:55	Apogee: 550 kilometres (340 mi).					
16 February	(United States) UGM-133 Trident II		(United States) USS Ohio (SSGN-726), Pacific Missile Range Facility		(United States) US Navy	
16 February		US Navy	Suborbital	Missile test	16 February	Successful
16 February	Follow-on Commander's Evaluation Test 53					
16 February	(United States) UGM-133 Trident II		(United States) USS Ohio (SSGN-726), Pacific Missile Range Facility		(United States) US Navy	
16 February		US Navy	Suborbital	Missile test	16 February	Successful
16 February	Follow-on Commander's Evaluation Test 53					
16 February	(United States) UGM-133 Trident II		(United States) USS Ohio (SSGN-726), Pacific Missile Range Facility		(United States) US Navy	
16 February		US Navy	Suborbital	Missile test	16 February	Successful
16 February	Follow-on Commander's Evaluation Test 53					
16 February	(United States) UGM-133 Trident II		(United States) USS Ohio (SSGN-726), Pacific Missile Range Facility		(United States) US Navy	
16 February		US Navy	Suborbital	Missile test	16 February	Successful
16 February	Follow-on Commander's Evaluation Test 53					
22 February; 10:14:00	(Canada) Black Brant IX		(United States) Poker Flat Research Range		(United States) NASA	
22 February; 10:14:00	(United States) ISINGLASS	Dartmouth College	Suborbital	Ionosphere research	22 February	Successful
1 March	(Canada) Black Brant IX		(United States) Poker Flat Research Range		(United States) NASA	
1 March	(United States) JETS	Goddard Space Flight Center	Suborbital	Magnetosphere research	1 March	Successful
1 March	Apogee: 330 kilometres (210 mi).					
1 March	(Canada) Black Brant IX		(United States) Poker Flat Research Range		(United States) NASA	
1 March	(United States) JETS	Goddard Space Flight Center	Suborbital	Magnetosphere research	1 March	Successful
1 March	Apogee: 190 kilometres (120 mi).					
1 March	(Canada) Black Brant IX		(United States) Poker Flat Research Range		(United States) NASA	
1 March	(United States) ISINGLASS	Dartmouth College	Suborbital	Ionosphere research	1 March	Successful
1 March	Apogee: 365 kilometres (227 mi).					
5 March; 22:34	(North Korea) Hwasong-9 (Scud-ER)		(North Korea) Sohae		(North Korea) Korean People's Army Strategic Force	
5 March; 22:34	(North Korea)	Korean People's Army Strategic Force	Suborbital	Missile test	5 March	Successful
5 March; 22:34	Apogee: 260 kilometres (160 mi). 1 of 4.					
5 March; 22:34	(North Korea) Hwasong-9 (Scud-ER)		(North Korea) Sohae		(North Korea) Korean People's Army Strategic Force	
5 March; 22:34	(North Korea)	Korean People's Army Strategic Force	Suborbital	Missile test	5 March	Successful
5 March; 22:34	Apogee: 260 kilometres (160 mi). 2 of 4.					
5 March; 22:34	(North Korea) Hwasong-9 (Scud-ER)		(North Korea) Sohae		(North Korea) Korean People's Army Strategic Force	
5 March; 22:34	(North Korea)	Korean People's Army Strategic Force	Suborbital	Missile test	5 March	Successful
5 March; 22:34	Apogee: 260 kilometres (160 mi). 3 of 4.					
5 March; 22:34	(North Korea) Hwasong-9 (Scud-ER)		(North Korea) Sohae		(North Korea) Korean People's Army Strategic Force	
5 March; 22:34	(North Korea)	Korean People's Army Strategic Force	Suborbital	Missile test	5 March	Successful
5 March; 22:34	Apogee: 260 kilometres (160 mi). 4 of 4.					
17 March	(South Korea) Hyunmoo-2B		(South Korea) Anheung Test Site		(South Korea) ADD	
17 March		ADD	Suborbital	Missile test	17 March	Successful
4 April; 21:42	(North Korea) Hwasong-12		(North Korea) Sinpo Shipyard		(North Korea) Korean People's Army Strategic Force	
4 April; 21:42	(North Korea)	Korean People's Army Strategic Force	Suborbital	Missile test	4 April	Failure
4 April; 21:42	Apogee: 189 kilometres (117 mi).					
7 April; 09:30	(Europe) Maxus		(Sweden) Esrange		(Europe) EuroLaunch	
7 April; 09:30	/ (Sweden) MAXUS-9	ESA / SSC	Suborbital	Microgravity	7 April	Successful
7 April; 09:30	Apogee: 678 kilometres (421 mi)					
26 April	(United States) Minuteman-III		(United States) Vandenberg Air Force Base LF-09		(United States) US Air Force	
26 April		US Air Force	Suborbital	Test flight	26 April	Successful
27 April	(India) Agni-III		(India) ITR IC-4		(India) Indian Army	
27 April		Indian Army	Suborbital	Missile test	27 April	Successful
27 April	Apogee: 350 kilometres (220 mi)					
3 May	(United States) Minuteman-III		(United States) Vandenberg Air Force Base LF-04		(United States) US Air Force	
3 May		US Air Force	Suborbital	Test flight	3 May	Successful
4 May	(India) Agni II		(India) Integrated Test Range		(India) Indian Army / DRDO	
4 May		Indian Army/DRDO	Suborbital	Missile test	4 May	Successful
5 May	(Canada) Black Brant IX		(United States) White Sands Missile Range		(United States) NASA	
5 May	(United States) RAISE 3	Southwest Research Institute	Suborbital	Solar research	5 May	Successful
5 May	Apogee: 296 kilometres (184 mi).					
13 May	(Brazil) VSB-30		(Sweden) Esrange		(Germany) DLR / (Sweden) SSC	
13 May	(Germany) MAPHEUS-6	DLR	Suborbital	Technology demonstration	13 May	Successful
13 May	Apogee: 254 kilometres (158 mi)					
14 May	(North Korea) Hwasong-12		(North Korea) Kusong		(North Korea) Korean People's Army Strategic Force	
14 May	(North Korea)	Korean People's Army Strategic Force	Suborbital	Missile Test	14 May	Successful
14 May	Apogee: 2,111 kilometres (1,312 mi)					
16 May	(Canada) Black Brant IX		(United States) Wallops Flight Facility		(United States) NASA	
16 May	(United States) SubTec-7	NASA	Suborbital	Technology demonstration	16 May	Successful
16 May	Apogee: 248 kilometres (154 mi).					
21 May; 07:59	(North Korea) Pukguksong-2		(North Korea) Yonpung Lake		(North Korea) Korean People's Army Strategic Force	
21 May; 07:59	(North Korea)	Korean People's Army Strategic Force	Suborbital	Missile test	21 May	Failure
21 May; 07:59	Apogee: 560 kilometres (350 mi).					
28 May; 20:40	(North Korea) Hwasong-6 MaRV version		(North Korea) Wonsan Airport		(North Korea) Korean People's Army Strategic Force	
28 May; 20:40	(North Korea) Maneuverable reentry vehicle	Korean People's Army Strategic Force	Suborbital	Missile test	28 May	Successful
28 May; 20:40	Apogee: 120 kilometres (75 mi).					
30 May	(United States) ICBM-T2	FTG-15	(United States) Ronald Reagan Ballistic Missile Defense Test Site		(United States) MDA	
30 May	(United States) FTG-15 target	MDA	Suborbital	ABM target	30 May	Successful
30 May	Ballistic missile target for interception					
30 May	(United States) GBI-OBV	FTG-15	(United States) Vandenberg Air Force Base		(United States) MDA	
30 May	(United States) FTG-15 interceptor	MDA	Suborbital	ABM test	30 May	Successful
30 May	Ballistic missile interceptor					
14 June	(United States) Sabre Zombi (ATACMS)		(United States) White Sands Missile Range		(United States) NASA	
14 June		US Army	Suborbital	Missile test	14 June	Successful
14 June	Apogee: 80 kilometres (50 mi)?					
22 June; 9:20	(United States) MRBM	SFTM-02	(United States) Pacific Missile Range Facility		(United States) MDA	
22 June; 9:20	(United States) SFTM-02 target	MDA	Suborbital	ABM target	22 June	Successful
22 June; 9:20	Ballistic missile target for interception					
22 June; ~9:20	(United States) SM-3	SFTM-02	(United States) USS John Paul Jones, Kauai		(United States) MDA	
22 June; ~9:20	(United States) SFTM-02 interceptor	MDA	Suborbital	ABM test	22 June	Failure
22 June; ~9:20	Ballistic missile interceptor, failed to intercept the target					
22 June	(United States) Terrier-Improved Orion		(United States) Wallops Flight Facility		(United States) NASA	
22 June	(United States) RockOn	University of Colorado	Suborbital	Student payloads	22 June	Successful
22 June	Apogee: 116 kilometres (72 mi).					
23 June	(South Korea) Hyunmoo-2C		(South Korea) Anheung Test Site		(South Korea) ADD	
23 June		ADD	Suborbital	Missile test	17 March	Successful
26 June	(Russia) RSM-56 Bulava		(Russia) K-535 Yury Dolgorukiy, White Sea		(Russia) VMF	
26 June		VMF	Suborbital	Missile test	26 June	Successful
27 June	(Canada) Black Brant IX		(United States) White Sands Missile Range		(United States) NASA	
27 June	(United States) CHESS-3	University of Colorado	Suborbital	UV Astronomy	27 June	Successful
29 June	(United States) Terrier-Improved Malemute		(United States) Wallops Flight Facility		(United States) NASA	
29 June	(United States) Ampoule Test Launch	NASA	Suborbital	Ionosphere research	29 June	Successful
29 June	Apogee: 190 kilometres (120 mi).					
30 June	(Brazil) VSB-30		(Australia) Woomera Test Range		(Australia) DSTO	
30 June	(Australia) / (United States) HiFire-4	DSTO / Boeing	Suborbital	Technology demonstration	30 June	Successful
30 June	Successful experimental hypersonic vehicle flight test, exceeded expectations in flight control performance.					
3 July	(North Korea) Hwasong-14		(North Korea) Panghyon		(North Korea) Korean People's Army Strategic Force	
3 July	(North Korea)	Korean People's Army Strategic Force	Suborbital	Missile Test	3 July	Successful
3 July	Apogee: 2,803 kilometres (1,742 mi). First confirmed North Korean ICBM test.					
11 July	(United States) IRBM-T1 ?	FFT-18	(United States) C-17, Pacific Ocean		(United States) MDA	
11 July	(United States)	MDA	Suborbital	ABM target	11 July	Successful
11 July	Apogee: 500 kilometres (310 mi), successfully intercepted					
11 July	(United States) THAAD	FFT-18	(United States) Kodiak		(United States) US Army	
11 July	(United States)	US Army/MDA	Suborbital	ABM test	11 July	Successful
11 July	Intercepted target missile, apogee: 100 kilometres (62 mi)					
23 July	(China) B-611		(China) Shuangchengzi		(China) PLA	
23 July		PLA	Suborbital	ABM target	23 July	Successful
23 July	Target					
23 July	(China) DN-3		(China) Jiuquan Satellite Launch Center		(China) PLARF	
23 July		PLARF	Suborbital	ABM test	23 July	Launch failure
28 July	(North Korea) Hwasong-14		(North Korea) Mupyong-ni Arms Factory		(North Korea) Korean People's Army Strategic Force	
28 July	(North Korea)	Korean People's Army Strategic Force	Suborbital	Missile Test	28 July	Successful
28 July	Apogee: 3,700 kilometres (2,300 mi).					
29 July	(Japan) Momo		(Japan) Taiki Aerospace Research Field		(Japan) Interstellar Technologies	
29 July		Interstellar Technologies	Suborbital	Test flight	29 July	Launch failure
29 July	Communications were lost just over one minute into the flight, resulting in an early shutdown of the engine.					
30 July	(United States) eMRBM ?	FET-01	(United States) C-17, Pacific Ocean		(United States) MDA	
30 July	(United States)	MDA	Suborbital	ABM target	30 July	Successful
30 July	Apogee: 300 kilometres (190 mi), successfully intercepted					
30 July	(United States) THAAD	FET-01	(United States) Kodiak		(United States) US Army	
30 July	(United States)	US Army/MDA	Suborbital	ABM test	30 July	Successful
30 July	Intercepted target missile, apogee: 100 kilometres (62 mi)					
2 August; 09:10	(United States) Minuteman-III		(United States) Vandenberg Air Force Base LF-10		(United States) US Air Force	
2 August; 09:10		US Air Force	Suborbital	Missile test	2 August	Successful
13 August; 09:30	(United States) Terrier-Improved Malemute		(United States) Wallops Flight Facility		(United States) NASA	
13 August; 09:30	(United States) RockSat-X	NASA	Suborbital	Student experiments	13 August	Successful
13 August; 09:30	Apogee: 151 kilometres (94 mi).					
23 August	(China) DF-4		(China) Taiyuan Satellite Launch Center		(China) PLARF	
23 August		PLARF	Suborbital	Missile test	23 August	Successful
29 August	(North Korea) Hwasong-12		(North Korea) Pyongyang International Airport		(North Korea) Korean People's Army Strategic Force	
29 August	(North Korea)	Korean People's Army Strategic Force	Suborbital	Missile test	29 August	Successful
29 August	Apogee: 550 kilometres (340 mi).					
29 August	(United States) MRBM-T3 ?	FTM-27 E2	(United States) Pacific Missile Range Facility		(United States) MDA	
29 August		MDA	Suborbital	ABM target	29 August	Successful
29 August	FTM-27 E2 target, successfully intercepted by SM-6 missile in low altitude					
9 September; 11:34	(Canada) Black Brant IX		(Marshall Islands) Kwajalein Atoll		(United States) NASA	
9 September; 11:34	(United States) WINDY	NASA	Suborbital	Ionosphere research	9 September	Successful
9 September; 11:34	Apogee: 409 kilometres (254 mi).					
9 September; 11:39	(United States) Terrier Malemute		(Marshall Islands) Kwajalein Atoll		(United States) NASA	
9 September; 11:39	(United States) WINDY	NASA	Suborbital	Ionosphere research	9 September	Partial failure
9 September; 11:39	Useful data was not obtained.					
12 September	(Russia) RS-24 Yars		(Russia) Plesetsk		(Russia) RVSN	
12 September		RVSN	Suborbital	Missile test	12 September	Successful
14 September	(North Korea) Hwasong-12		(North Korea) Pyongyang International Airport		(North Korea) Korean People's Army Strategic Force	
14 September	(North Korea)	Korean People's Army Strategic Force	Suborbital	Missile test	14 September	Successful
14 September	Apogee: 770 kilometres (480 mi).					
17 September	(United States) PTV		(United States) Ronald Reagan Ballistic Missile Defense Test Site		(United States) Orbital ATK	
17 September	(United States) Patriot target vehicle	SMC	Suborbital	ABM target	17 September	Successful
17 September	Ballistic missile target for interception					
17 September	(United States) MIM-104 Patriot		(United States) Ronald Reagan Ballistic Missile Defense Test Site		(United States) SMC	
17 September		SMC	Suborbital	ABM test	17 September	Successful
17 September	Ballistic missile interceptor					
20 September	(Russia) RS-24 Yars		(Russia) Plesetsk		(Russia) RVSN	
20 September		RVSN	Suborbital	Missile test	20 September	Successful
22 September	(Iran) Khorramshahr		(Iran) Semnan		(Iran) AFIRI	
22 September		AFIRI	Suborbital	Missile test	22 September	Successful
25 September	(United States) Terrier-Oriole		(United Kingdom) South Uist, Hebrides		(United States) MDA	
25 September		DOD	Suborbital	Radar-Target	25 September	Successful
25 September	Radar-Target, apogee: ~100 kilometres (62 mi)?					
26 September	(Russia) RS-12M Topol		(Russia) Kapustin Yar		(Russia) RVSN	
26 September		RVSN	Suborbital	Missile test	26 September	Successful
4 October; 11:45	(Canada) Black Brant IX		(United States) Wallops Flight Facility		(United States) NASA	
4 October; 11:45	(United States) ASPIRE	NASA	Suborbital	Technology demonstration	4 October	Successful
4 October; 11:45	Tested Mars 2020's parachute					
15 October	(United States) Terrier-Oriole	FS-17 E4	(United Kingdom) South Uist, Hebrides		(United States) MDA	
15 October		DOD	Suborbital	ABM target	15 October	Successful
15 October	SM-3 Target, apogee: ~100 kilometres (62 mi)?					
15 October	(United States) SM-3	FS-17 E4	(United States) USS Donald Cook (DDG-75), Hebrides Range		(United States) US Navy	
15 October		US Navy	Suborbital	ABM test	15 October	Successful
15 October	Second Aegis-Test in the North Atlantic, successful intercept, apogee: ~100 kilometres (62 mi)?					
26 October	(Russia) RS-12M Topol		(Russia) Plesetsk		(Russia) RVSN	
26 October		RVSN	Suborbital	Missile test	26 October	Successful
26 October	(Russia) R-29R Volna		(Russia) Russian submarine, Sea of Okhotsk		(Russia) VMF	
26 October		VMF	Suborbital	Missile test	26 October	Successful
26 October	(Russia) R-29R Volna		(Russia) Russian submarine, Sea of Okhotsk		(Russia) VMF	
26 October		VMF	Suborbital	Missile test	26 October	Successful
26 October	(Russia) R-29RMU Sineva		(Russia) Russian submarine, Barents Sea		(Russia) VMF	
26 October		VMF	Suborbital	Missile test	26 October	Successful
30 October	(United States) UGM-27 Polaris (STARS)		(United States) Barking Sands LC-42		(United States) US Navy	
30 October	(United States) CPS FE-1	US Navy	Suborbital	Technology	30 October	Successful
30 October	Conventional Prompt Strike Flight Experiment-1, successful hypersonic glide vehicle test					
30 October; 10:00	(Canada) Black Brant IX		(United States) White Sands Missile Range		(United States) NASA	
30 October; 10:00	(United States) DEUCE	NASA	Suborbital	Astronomy	30 October	Partial failure
30 October; 10:00	Black Brant rocket performed flawlessly but science data was not obtained.					
16 November	(United States) Sabre Zombi (ATACMS)		(United States) Fort Bliss McGregor Range		(United States) NASA	
16 November		US Army	Suborbital	Missile test	16 November	Successful
16 November	Apogee: 80 kilometres (50 mi)?					
28 November; 18:18	(North Korea) Hwasong-15		(North Korea) Pyongsong		(North Korea) Korean People's Army Strategic Force	
28 November; 18:18	(North Korea)	Korean People's Army Strategic Force	Suborbital	Missile test	28 November	Successful
28 November; 18:18	Apogee: 4,475 kilometres (2,781 mi).					
4 December	(Israel) Black Sparrow		F-15 Eagle, Israel		(Israel) IAF	
4 December		IAI/IDF	Suborbital	Missile test target	4 December	Launch failure
4 December	Arrow-III interceptor launch was called off after launch failure of the target missile					
12 December	(United States) New Shepard		(United States) Corn Ranch		(United States) Blue Origin	
12 December	(United States) New Shepard crew capsule	Blue Origin	Suborbital	Test flight	12 December	Successful
12 December	Flight test with new capsule					
26 December; 03:30	(Russia) RS-12M Topol		(Russia) Kapustin Yar		(Russia) RVSN	
26 December; 03:30		RVSN	Suborbital	Missile test	26 December	Successful

== Deep-space rendezvous ==
Date (UTC)	Spacecraft	Event	Remarks
2 February	Juno	4th perijove of Jupiter	A decision was made to cancel a period reduction maneuver and remain in a 53-day orbit for the remainder of the mission over engine concerns.
27 March	Juno	5th perijove	
22 April	Cassini	127th flyby of Titan	Closest approach: 979 kilometres (608 mi).
19 May	Juno	6th perijove	
11 July	Juno	7th perijove	
1 September	Juno	8th perijove	
15 September	Cassini	End of mission	Intentional destructive entry into Saturn's atmosphere
23 September	OSIRIS-REx	Flyby of Earth	Gravity assist to accelerate the probe towards its destination
24 October	Juno	9th perijove	
16 December	Juno	10th perijove	

== Extravehicular activities (EVAs) ==
Start date/time	Duration	End time	Spacecraft	Crew	Remarks
6 January; 12:23	6 hours 31 minutes	18:54	Expedition 50; ISS Quest	(United States) Robert S. Kimbrough; (United States) Peggy Whitson	The crew completed the installation of new batteries on the station's power channel 3A, and then executed a series of tasks to get ahead for the next EVA. Kimbrough collected photos of the AMS-02, then they removed a broken light on the S3 truss and routed Ethernet cables on the Z1 truss.
13 January; 11:22	5 hours 58 minutes	17:20	Expedition 50; ISS Quest	(United States) Robert S. Kimbrough; (France) Thomas Pesquet	The crew completed the installation of new batteries on the station's power channel 1A, and then executed a series of get ahead tasks. First they installed a new camera on the Mobile Transporter Relay Assembly, then Pesquet replaced a Worksite Interface Adapter on Canadarm-2 and collected photos of Z1 truss and S0 truss, meanwhile Kimbrough removed 2 handrails from the Destiny module. Then they picked up a bundle of covers and brought them to the Tranquillity module where will be installed when Pressurized Mating Adapter 3 will be moved from Node 3 to Node 2. When removed, the PMA's Common Berthing Mechanism will be covered up to protect it from the space environment.
24 March; 11:24	6 hours 34 minutes	17:58	Expedition 50; ISS Quest	(United States) Robert S. Kimbrough; (France) Thomas Pesquet	Kimbrough replaced the External Control Zone 2 (EXT-2) multiplexer–demultiplexer (MDM) with an upgraded "EPIC MDM" and prepared PMA-3 for its robotic relocation on Sunday. Pesquet inspected the Radiator Beam Valve Module for ammonia leaks, then lubricated one of the Latching End Effectors of Dextre. Kimbrough then replaced a pair of cameras on the Kibo module, and a light on one of the CETA carts.
30 March; 11:29	7 hours 4 minutes	18:33	Expedition 50; ISS Quest	(United States) Robert S. Kimbrough; (United States) Peggy Whitson	Kimbrough replaced the External Control Zone 1 (EXT-1) multiplexer–demultiplexer (MDM) with an upgraded "EPIC MDM" while Whitson connected heater power and heater feedback telemetry to enable PMA-3 to be repressurized, then released a series of straps to free up a cover that protected the APAS. The astronauts then installed axial shields on PMA-3's former location on Tranquillity module and installed covers on PMA-3. One of the shields was lost but the others were installed successfully.
12 May; 13:01	4 hours 13 minutes	17:21	Expedition 51; ISS Quest	(United States) Peggy Whitson; (United States) Jack Fischer	EXT-1 MDM remove and replace; Lab EWC antenna install
23 May; 11:20	2 hours 46 minutes	14:06	Expedition 51; ISS Quest	(United States) Peggy Whitson; (United States) Jack Fischer	Throughout this hurriedly planned "contingency" spacewalk, both Fischer and Whitson successfully replaced a failed multiplexer–demultiplexer (MDM), and installed a pair of antennas on station to enhance wireless communication for future spacewalks.
17 August; 14:36	7 hours 34 minutes	22:10	Expedition 52; ISS Pirs	(Russia) Fyodor Yurchikhin; (Russia) Sergey Ryazansky	Test of an upgraded version of the Orlan space suit, the Orlan MKS; Restavratsiya retrieval; Deployment of 5 small satellites; Impakt installation; Adapter installation on Poisk sensors; BKDO (БКДО) reposition; Test sample collection; Hand rail and exposure init installation
5 October; 12:05	6 hours 55 minutes	19:00	Expedition 53; ISS Quest	(United States) Randolph Bresnik; (United States) Mark Vande Hei	Removal of LEE-A from SSRMS; Removal of POA LEE via 6 EDF bolts; Installation of POA LEE as new SSRMS LEE-A; Installation of former LEE-A on POA; SSRMS power-up and checkout
10 October; 11:56	6 hours 26 minutes	18:22	Expedition 53; ISS Quest	(United States) Randolph Bresnik; (United States) Mark Vande Hei	ESP-1 PFCS rotate by 90°; CP9 camera group R/R; LEE-A ballscrew lubrication; POA LEE socket removal; MT camera lens replacement; Hand rail removal (x2)
20 October; 11:47	6 hours 49 minutes	18:36	Expedition 53; ISS Quest	(United States) Randolph Bresnik; (United States) Joseph Acaba	Dextre EOTP fuse replacement; Canadarm2 LEE-A CLA remove and replace; CP3 HD camera installation; MLI removal from ORUs (x2)

== Orbital launch statistics ==
=== By country ===
For the purposes of this section, the yearly tally of orbital launches by country assigns each flight to the country of origin of the rocket, not to the launch services provider or the spaceport. For example, Soyuz launches by Arianespace in Kourou are counted under Russia because Soyuz-2 is a Russian rocket.

Country	Launches	Successes	Failures	Partial failures
China	18	16	1	1
France	6	6	0	0
India	5	4	1	0
Iran	1	0	1	0
Italy	3	3	0	0
Japan	7	6	1	0
Russia	20 (Note: Includes two European Soyuz launches from Kourou, French Guiana by Arianespace.)	18	1	1
Ukraine	1 (Note: Zenit launch from Baikonur by S7 Space)	1	0	0
United States	30 (Note: Includes Electron launches from Māhia)	29	1	0
World	91	83	6	2

=== By rocket ===
- Ariane 5
- Atlas V
- Delta II
- Delta IV
- Falcon 9 new
- Falcon 9 reused
- H-IIA
- Long March 2
- Long March 3
- Long March 4
- Long March 5
- Long March 6
- Long March 7
- Minotaur IV
- Minotaur-C
- PSLV
- Soyuz-U
- Soyuz-FG
- Soyuz-2 (Russia)
- Soyuz-ST (Europe)
- Proton-M
- Rokot
- Vega
- Others

==== By family ====
Family	Country	Launches	Successes	Failures	Partial failures	Remarks
Antares	United States	1	1	0	0	
Ariane	France	6	6	0	0	
Atlas	United States	6	6	0	0	
Delta	United States	2	2	0	0	
Electron	United States	1	0	1	0	Maiden flight
Falcon	United States	18	18	0	0	
GSLV	India	1	1	0	0	
GSLV Mk III	India	1	1	0	0	First orbital flight
H-II	Japan	6	6	0	0	
Kaituozhe	China	1	1	0	0	
Kuaizhou	China	1	1	0	0	
Long March	China	16	14	1	1	
Minotaur	United States	2	2	0	0	
PSLV	India	3	2	1	0	
R-7	Russia	15	13	1	1	
S-Series	Japan	1	0	1	0	
Simorgh	Iran	1	0	1	0	First orbital flight
Universal Rocket	Russia	5	5	0	0	
Vega	Italy	3	3	0	0	
Zenit	Ukraine	1	1	0	0	

==== By type ====
Rocket	Country	Family	Launches	Successes	Failures	Partial failures	Remarks
Antares 200	United States	Antares	1	1	0	0	
Ariane 5	France	Ariane	6	6	0	0	
Atlas V	United States	Atlas	6	6	0	0	
Delta II	United States	Delta	1	1	0	0	
Delta IV	United States	Delta	1	1	0	0	
Electron	United States	Electron	1	0	1	0	Maiden flight
Falcon 9	United States	Falcon	18	18	0	0	
GSLV	India	GSLV	1	1	0	0	
GSLV Mk III	India	GSLV Mk III	1	1	0	0	First orbital flight
Kaituozhe-2	China	Kaituozhe	1	1	0	0	Maiden flight
Kuaizhou 1	China	Kuaizhou	1	1	0	0	
Minotaur IV	United States	Minotaur	1	1	0	0	
Minotaur-C	United States	Minotaur	1	1	0	0	
H-IIA	Japan	H-II	6	6	0	0	
Long March 2	China	Long March	6	6	0	0	
Long March 3	China	Long March	5	4	0	1	
Long March 4	China	Long March	2	2	0	0	
Long March 5	China	Long March	1	0	1	0	
Long March 6	China	Long March	1	1	0	0	
Long March 7	China	Long March	1	1	0	0	
PSLV	India	PSLV	3	2	1	0	
Proton	Russia	Universal Rocket	4	4	0	0	
SS-520	Japan	S-Series	1	0	1	0	
Simorgh	Iran	Simorgh	1	0	1	0	First orbital flight
Soyuz	Russia	R-7	5	5	0	0	
Soyuz-2	Russia	R-7	10	8	1	1	
UR-100	Russia	Universal Rocket	1	1	0	0	
Vega	Italy	Vega	3	3	0	0	
Zenit-3	Ukraine	Zenit	1	1	0	0	

==== By configuration ====
Rocket	Country	Type	Launches	Successes	Failures	Partial failures	Remarks
Antares 230	United States	Antares 200	1	1	0	0	
Ariane 5 ECA	France	Ariane 5	5	5	0	0	
Ariane 5 ES	France	Ariane 5	1	1	0	0	
Atlas V 401	United States	Atlas V	4	4	0	0	
Atlas V 421	United States	Atlas V	1	1	0	0	
Atlas V 541	United States	Atlas V	1	1	0	0	
Delta II 7920	United States	Delta II	1	1	0	0	Final flight
Delta IV Medium+ (5,4)	United States	Delta IV	1	1	0	0	
Electron	United States	Electron	1	0	1	0	Maiden flight
Falcon 9 Full Thrust	United States	Falcon 9	14	14	0	0	
Falcon 9 Block 4	United States	Falcon 9	4	4	0	0	Maiden flight
GSLV Mk II	India	GSLV	1	1	0	0	
GSLV Mk III	India	GSLV Mk III	1	1	0	0	First orbital flight
H-IIA 202	Japan	H-IIA	4	4	0	0	
H-IIA 204	Japan	H-IIA	2	2	0	0	
Kaituozhe-2	China	Kaituozhe-2	1	1	0	0	Maiden flight
Kuaizhou 1A	China	Kuaizhou	1	1	0	0	
Long March 2C	China	Long March 2	3	3	0	0	
Long March 2D	China	Long March 2	3	3	0	0	
Long March 3B/E	China	Long March 3	5	4	0	1	
Long March 4B	China	Long March 4	1	1	0	0	
Long March 4C	China	Long March 4	1	1	0	0	
Long March 5	China	Long March 5	1	0	1	0	Maiden flight
Long March 6	China	Long March 6	1	1	0	0	
Long March 7	China	Long March 7	1	1	0	0	
Minotaur IV / Orion 38	United States	Minotaur IV	1	1	0	0	
Minotaur-C	United States	Minotaur-C	1	1	0	0	
Proton-M / Briz-M	Russia	Proton	4	4	0	0	
PSLV-XL	India	PSLV	3	2	1	0	
Rokot / Briz-KM	Russia	UR-100	1	1	0	0	
SS-520-4	Japan	S-Series	1	0	1	0	Maiden flight
Simorgh	Iran	Simorgh	1	0	1	0	First orbital flight
Soyuz-FG	Russia	Soyuz	4	4	0	0	
Soyuz-U	Russia	Soyuz	1	1	0	0	Final flight
Soyuz-2.1a or ST-A	Russia	Soyuz-2	2	2	0	0	
Soyuz 2.1a or ST-A / Fregat-M	Russia	Soyuz-2	2	1	0	1	
Soyuz-2.1b or ST-B / Fregat-M	Russia	Soyuz-2	4	3	1	0	
Soyuz-2.1b or ST-B / Fregat-MT	Russia	Soyuz-2	1	1	0	0	
Soyuz-2-1v / Volga	Russia	Soyuz-2	1	1	0	0	
Vega	Italy	Vega	3	3	0	0	
Zenit-3F	Ukraine	Zenit-3	1	1	0	0	

=== By spaceport ===
- Jiuquan
- Taiyuan
- Wenchang
- Xichang
- Kourou
- Satish Dhawan
- Semnan
- Tanegashima
- Uchinoura
- Baikonur
- Mahia
- Plesetsk
- Vostochny
- Cape Canaveral
- Kennedy
- MARS
- Vandenberg

Site	Country	Launches	Successes	Failures	Partial failures	Remarks
Baikonur	Kazakhstan	13	12	0	1	
Cape Canaveral	United States	7	7	0	0	
Jiuquan	China	6	6	0	0	
Kennedy	United States	12	12	0	0	
Kourou	France	11	11	0	0	
Mahia	New Zealand	1	0	1	0	First launch
MARS	United States	1	1	0	0	
Plesetsk	Russia	5	5	0	0	
Satish Dhawan	India	5	4	1	0	
Semnan	Iran	1	0	1	0	
Taiyuan	China	2	2	0	0	
Tanegashima	Japan	6	6	0	0	
Uchinoura	Japan	1	0	1	0	
Vandenberg	United States	9	9	0	0	
Vostochny	Russia	1	0	1	0	
Wenchang	China	2	1	1	0	
Xichang	China	8	7	0	1	
Total		91	83	6	2	

=== By orbit ===
- Transatmospheric
- Low Earth
- Low Earth (ISS)
- Low Earth (SSO)
- Low Earth (polar)
- Medium Earth
- Geosychronous
  (transfer)
- High Earth
- Heliocentric

Orbital regime	Launches	Achieved	Not achieved	Accidentally achieved	Remarks
Transatmospheric	0	0	0	0	
Low Earth	52	48	4	0	including 13 to ISS, 1 to Tiangong-2
Geosynchronous / transfer	33	31	2	0	
Medium Earth	3	3	0	1	IRNSS-1H did not separate from rocket's second stage, and was stuck in an elliptical orbit with 6000 km apogee
High Earth	3	3	0	0	including highly elliptical Tundra orbits
Total	91	85	6	1	
