= Epaminondas Stassinopoulos =

German-American astrophysicist (1921–2022)

Epaminondas George Aristotle Alexander Stassinopoulos (January 17, 1921 – May 16, 2022) was an American astrophysicist, author, and Resistance member against the Nazis occupying Greece during World War II. He served as the Head of the Radiation Physics Office at NASA’s Goddard Space Flight Center until 2006, when he transitioned to Emeritus status until 2021. He was the author of numerous papers and articles in the field of space radiation.

== Early life and education ==
The youngest son of Yiorgos Stassinopoulos and wife Helene Costi von Paschalides, both of Greek descent, Stassinopoulos was born in Bonn, Rhineland, Prussia, Germany, in 1921 and spent his childhood in Berlin, Brandenburg, where his grandfather Johann von Paschalides had been knighted by Kaiser Wilhelm II for supplying the German Army with tobacco during World War I. Stassinopoulos and his older brother John were assaulted by the Hitler Youth in 1935, and after recovering in hospital, were sent to Athens, Greece, in 1935 to escape Nazism. In Greece, Stassinopoulos served as a member of the Greek resistance (the EKKA resistance movement and the 2nd Bureau for Intelligence and Counterintelligence) after the Axis occupation of Greece in 1941 in the Hellenic State.

After being drafted to serve in the 1st Infantry Division of the Greek Army during the Greek Civil War from 1946 to 1949, and fighting in the battles of Grammos-Vitsi, Malimathi, Konitsa, and on the Albanian border; Stassinopoulos studied law, and then emigrated to the United States in 1954 with his wife and infant daughter.

== Career ==
Stassinopoulos joined NASA's Goddard Space Flight Center (GSFC) in Greenbelt, Maryland, in 1961, after graduate studies in Mathematics and Physics at The American University and The Catholic University in Washington, D.C. As the Head of Goddard's Radiation Physics Office, he worked on application-oriented research in magnetospheric physics, geomagnetism, solar-terrestrial relationships, natural and man-made radiation exposure, radiation effects on biological and electronic systems and components, and radiation environment modeling. His major research activities included orbital flux integration studies; radiation environment assessment for flight projects and evaluation of impact on flight missions; 3-D radiation transport and shielding studies; modeling of physical processes in the Earth's magnetosphere; large-scale flight and ground data analysis and correlation; planning, design, and development of modern, automated irradiation test facilities; dosimetry research and evaluation; design and development of radiation monitoring equipment and instruments; miniaturization of radiation spectrometers; and global mapping of atmospheric cosmic rays and their progeny.

Stassinopoulos was the principal investigator in 23 original research projects for NASA and he was the author or co-author of 146 papers and articles in peer-reviewed scientific, technical, and engineering journals and books; 31 special official NASA publications; and 154 NASA Technical Study, Research, and Analysis Publications in the field of space radiation. He was a co-founder of the Radiation Effects on Components and Systems (RADECS) organization in 1989 at the University of Montpellier 2, France. He served as the Chair of a NASA Headquarters-established "Charged Particle Radiation Panel" for the development of NASA Engineering Standards for STS missions and as Chair of the US Government Consortium (NASA-NSA-NRL-USASDC) for the design and implementation of a fully automated "Irradiation Test and Research Facility" at the Department of Energy's Brookhaven National Laboratory.

Stassinopoulos micro-miniaturized two prototype space-qualified and pedigreed radiation monitors/dosimeters/spectrometers into a single pill-box sized hybrid instrument, a Pulse Height Analyzer (PHA) called the Miniature High-LET Radiation Spectrometer, weighing less than 90 grams, and was awarded a US Patent (No. 7465926 B2) on December 16, 2008 for his "Device system and method for a miniaturized radiation spectrometer." The instrument has been used for flight measurements on commercial jets, the Concorde, and the STS-95 Host Mission. Stassinopoulos' PHA instrument is currently collecting data on the NASA DSCOVR satellite, which was launched on February 11, 2015.

After 45 years of service to NASA, Stassinopoulos retired to Emeritus status and continued to study and analyze space radiation data from the PHA. At 95 years of age, he authored a NASA Technical Publication (STI#25740 TN28435-Stass-2015) with fellow NASA scientists MA Xapsos and CA Stauffer, "Forty-Year 'Drift' and Change of the South Atlantic Anomaly (SAA)", making him one of the oldest publishing research scientists and authors in NASA's history.

== Personal life and death ==
Stassinopoulos married Eftichia "Effie" Pappaioannou, a philologist and archaeologist, on 16 July 1950. They had one daughter and three grandchildren. Effie died in 2013. Stassinopoulos turned 100 in January 2021, and died in Los Angeles on May 16, 2022, at the age of 101.

== Awards and honors ==
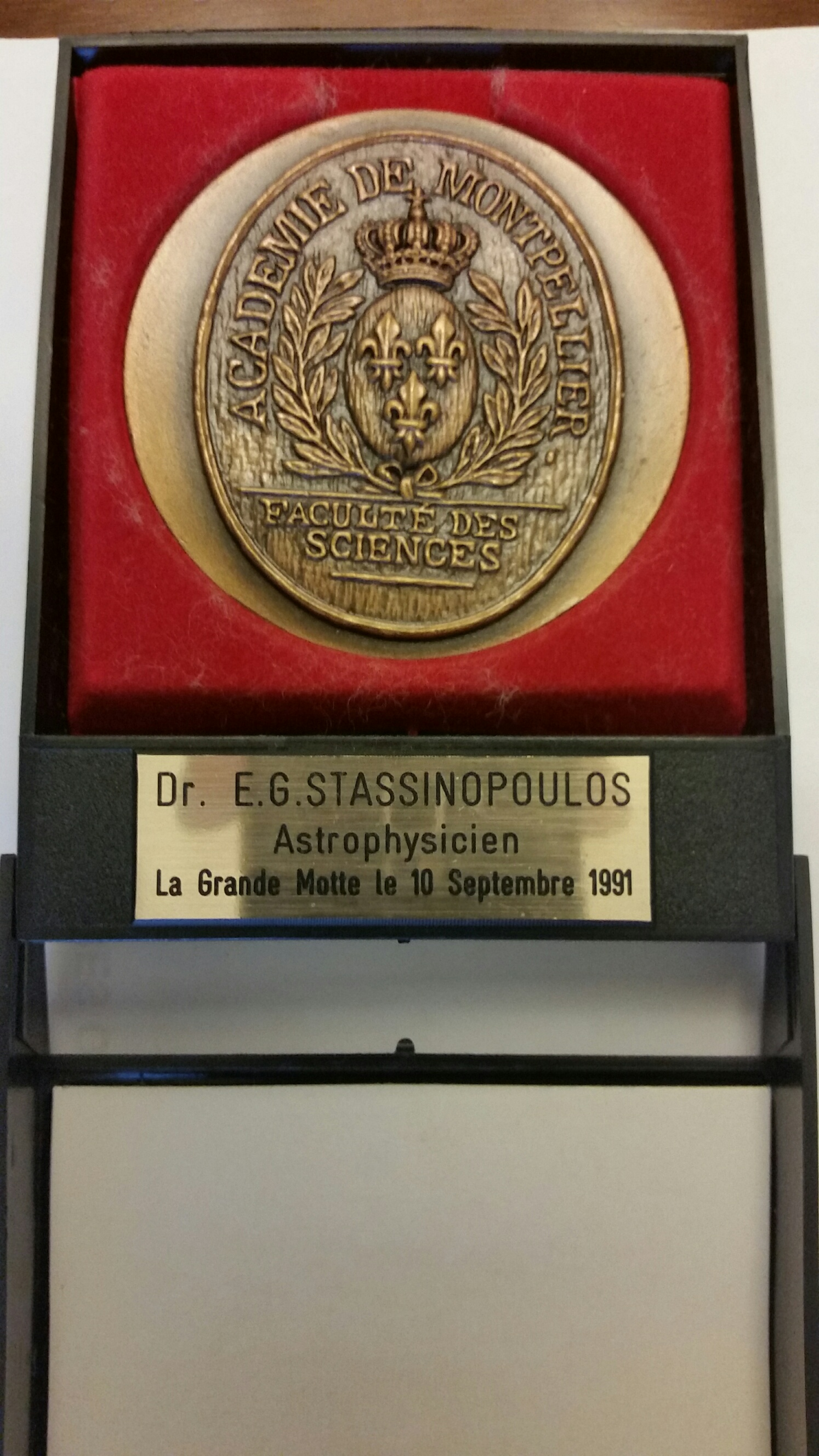
Faculte des Sciences Medal from the Academie de Montpellier, France

During his career, Stassinopoulos received numerous awards, including the IEEE Radiation Effects Award (2000); the APOLLO-XI Achievement Award; a Faculte des Sciences medal from the Academie de Montpellier, France; the NASA Exceptional Service Medal in 1992, and the GSFC "Award of Merit" in 1999.

== Selected bibliography ==
- Stassinopoulos, E., Stauffer, C., & Brucker, G. (1998). Miniature high-let radiation spectrometer for space and avionics applications. Nuclear Inst. and Methods in Physics Research, a, 416(2), 531-535.
- Barth, J., Dyer, C., & Stassinopoulos, E. (2003). Space, atmospheric, and terrestrial radiation environments. IEEE Transactions on Nuclear Science, 50(3), 466-482.
- Stassinopoulos, E., Brucker, G., Adolphsen, J., & Barth, J. (1996). Radiation-induced anomalies in satellites. Journal of Spacecraft and Rockets, 33(6), 877-882.
- Xapsos, M., Huston, S., Barth, J., & Stassinopoulos, E. (2002). Probabilistic model for low-altitude trapped-proton fluxes. IEEE Transactions on Nuclear Science, 49(6), 2776-2781.
- Xapsos, M., Stauffer, C., Gee, G., Barth, J., Stassinopoulos, E., et al. (2004). Model for solar proton risk assessment. IEEE Transactions on Nuclear Science, 51(6), 3394-3398.
- Stassinopoulos, E., Brucker, G., Nakamura, D., Stauffer, C., Gee, G., et al. (1996). Solar flare proton evaluation at geostationary orbits for engineering applications. IEEE Transactions on Nuclear Science, 43(2), 369-382.
- Stassinopoulos, E. G. et al. The Liulin-3m Radiometer for Measuring Particle Doses in Space and on Aircraft NASA TM-2002-21003, February 2002. NTRS 20020045323
- Stassinopoulos, E. G. Measurements et al.. Measurements of Radiation Exposure on Commercial Aircraft with the Liulin-3m Instrument NTRS 1999109154, p. 82, 1998.
- Stassinopoulos, E. G. "The Earth's Trapped and Transient Space Radiation Environment" in Space Radiation and Its Biological Effects, NATO ASI Series A: Life Sciences. v.154 Plenum Press, 1987. Edited by Percival D. McCormack, Charles E. Swenberg and Horst Bücker
