= ROBUSTA-1B =

French nano-satellite experiment

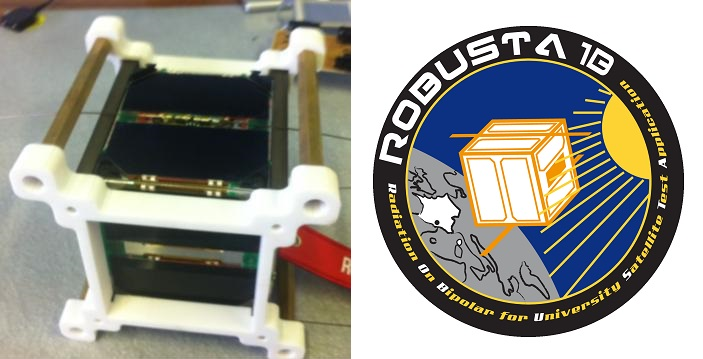
- Mission type: Technology
- Operator: Centre Spatial Universitaire Montpellier-Nîmes
- COSPAR ID: 2017-036AD
- SATCAT no.: 42792
- Mission duration: 2 years

Spacecraft properties
- Spacecraft type: 1U CubeSat
- Launch mass: 1 kilogram (2.2 lb)

Start of mission
- Launch date: 23 June 2017
- Rocket: PSLV
- Contractor: ISRO

Orbital parameters
- Reference system: Geocentric
- Regime: Low Earth

ROBUSTA-1B (Radiation on Bipolar Test for University Satellite Application) is a nano-satellite (Cubesat) scientific experiment developed by the University of Montpellier students, a successor to the ROBUSTA satellite, which was launched in February 2012 and lost soon after.

ROBUSTA-1B carries an updated version of the ROBUSTA payload, an experiment to check the deterioration of electronic components based on bipolar transistors, when exposed to in-flight space radiation. The results of the experiment will be used to validate a new radiation test method proposed by the laboratory.

== ROBUSTA Comparison ==
Started as a simple reflight of ROBUSTA, the project quickly became a complete upgrade of most of the satellite's systems, using the feedback provided by the previous project.
