= Centre Spatial Universitaire Montpellier-Nîmes =

Centre spatial universitaire Montpellier-Nimes
- Industry: Student training, research, nanosatellite engineering and tests, expertise
- Headquarters: Montpellier, France
- Website: http://csu.edu.umontpellier.fr/

The Centre Spatial Universitaire (CSU) Montpellier-Nîmes (Montpellier-Nîmes University Space Center) is a division of the University of Montpellier. Its purpose is to educate students in space sciences through the design, production and testing of nanosatellites. The CSU was created to consolidate nanosatellite activities that were initiated in 2006 by the RADIAC (radiation and components) team of the Institut d'Electronique et des Systèmes, a research institute also affiliated with the university.

== Education and research ==
=== Student participation ===
The CSU engages students at various levels from several institutions in nanosatellite projects:

- B.Sc. and M.Sc. students from the University of Montpellier
- Students from the Nîmes and Montpellier IUTs (university technological institutes)
- Ph.D. candidates

=== Research ===
The CSU also coordinates Ph.D. and postdoctoral students funded by the Van Allen Foundation. These students, along with CSU personnel, present their scientific work in conferences such as the RADECS (Radiation effects on components and systems) and the 4S Symposium (Small Satellites Systems and Services), as well as publishing their work in scientific journals.

== Past Projects ==
=== Robusta-1A ===
In 2006, University of Montpellier responded to a request for student satellite projects by CNES (the French national space agency) with ROBUSTA (Radiation On Bipolar for University Satellite Test Application), an experiment measuring space radiation-induced degradation of bipolar electronic components. The purpose of the project was to validate a test method proposed by the RADIAC team of the Institut d'Electronique et des Systèmes. The ROBUSTA project was approved and after a 6-year development period, over the course of which about 300 students participated, the satellite was launched on the maiden flight of the Vega launcher on 13 February 2012, becoming the first French cubesat to be launched. Reentry occurred in February 2015.

=== FRP on Baumanets-2 ===
In 2009, the French-Russian collaboration FRIENDS was launched. This project is a partnership between the Universite of Montpellier and the Bauman Moscow State Technical University, during which students from Montpellier designed and produced one of the payloads (FRP – French Research Payload) for BMSTU's student satellite Baumanets-2. The payload experiment was derived from Robusta (research on bipolar component degradation due to space radiation). Student exchanges were also conducted during the project. FRP was designed and tested between 2009 and 2012, and sent to BMSTU in 2013. Baumanets-2 was launched on November 28, 08:41:46 (Moscow Time, UTC+03:00) from a Soyuz-2-1b. However, due to an issue with the Fregat upper stage, all satellites were lost.

== Ongoing projects ==
=== Robusta-1B ===
Robusta-1B is an upgraded version of Robusta-1A with new quality assurance procedures intended to enable CSU to validate a new standard 1-U (Note: 1 unit : 10*10*10 cm, 1kg, 1W, per Cubesat Standard) cubesat platform, dubbed Robusta-1U. Due to problems with SpaceX's Falcon launcher, launch has been delayed several times, before being moved to a PSLV launch on July 23, 2017

=== Robusta-1C / MTCube ===
Started in 2014, MTCube's goal is to test (on behalf of the European Space Agency) the hardness of several types of memory against space radiation: Flash memory, SRAM, MRAM and FRAM.

=== CELESTA ===
The CERN Latchup Experiment and STudent sAtellite, CELESTA, started in 2015 as a collaboration between the CSU, the University of Montpellier and the European Organization for Nuclear Research, CERN. The scope of the research is the integration of the CERN Radiation Monitors as scientific payload on a 1U CubeSat based on the Robusta structure. The project is supported by the CERN Knowledge Transfer and it is the first nanosatellite project ever started and financed by CERN.

=== Robusta-3A / Méditerranée ===
The Méditerranée project will be a 3U cubesat, whose main missions are:

- Transmission of GPS data between ships and Météo-France's reception centers in order to improve weather forecasting in the Mediterranean area.
- Provide data transmission capabilities to isolated schools in Madagascar and Burkina-Faso.

=== Experimental rockets ===
The experimental rockets program allows IUT de Nîmes students to design and test rockets (Fusex) for Planete Science's C'Space annual challenge. The first successful launch occurred in 2013 with a nominal flight.

== Staff ==
The space center staff (about 50 people) is composed of associate and full professors, teachers, engineers, post-doctoral students, Ph.D. students, interns and radio hams.

== Facilities ==
New facilities in University of Montpellier, completed in Q3-2015 provide a dedicated work area with mechanical and thermal test capabilities for CSU, its private industry collaborators, and other nanosatellite manufacturers. A gamma irradiation facility is under construction and expected to start operations in early 2017.
