= NanoACE =

CubeSat technology demonstration

- Mission type: Technology demonstration
- Operator: Terran Orbital
- COSPAR ID: 2017-042V
- Website: tyvak.eu/missions/nanoace

Spacecraft properties
- Spacecraft type: CubeSat (3U)
- Manufacturer: Tyvak Nano-Satellite Systems
- Launch mass: 5.2 kg (11 lb)
- Dimensions: 30 cm × 10 cm × 10 cm (11.8 in × 3.9 in × 3.9 in)
- Power: 4 deployable solar panels

Start of mission
- Launch date: July 14, 2017, 7:36am UTC
- Rocket: Soyuz-2.1a
- Launch site: Baikonur Cosmodrome
- Contractor: Roscosmos

Orbital parameters
- Regime: Low Earth Orbit
- Periapsis altitude: 566.9 km (352.3 mi)
- Apoapsis altitude: 581.5 km (361.3 mi)
- Inclination: 97.4°
- Period: 96 minuets

NanoACE is a technology demonstration CubeSat by Tyvak Nano-Satellite Systems to validate their communications, navigation, guidance, and software technology. NanoACE was launched onboard a Soyuz-2.1a Fregat-M, on July 14, 2017, along with Russian Earth imaging satellite Kanopus-V-IK and 71 other CubeSats.

The satellite has two Infrared and two visible light cameras. It can maneuver via its cold gas propulsion system.
