= Landmapper =

Remote sensing cubesats

Landmapper is a remote sensing satellite constellation built and operated by Astro Digital (formerly known as Aquila Space). It consists of two separate satellite designs: Landmapper-BC and Landmapper-HD (formerly known as Corvus-BC and Corvus-HD). These satellites will be launched into Sun synchronous orbits varying in altitude between 625 km and 475 km. Both satellites are designed to CubeSat standards: 6U XL for Landmapper-BC, and 16U for Landmapper-HD. They will be contained in deployers designed by Innovative Solutions in Launch of the Netherlands and ECM Launch Services of Germany. These deployers are to be included on board a variety of launch vehicles, including the SpaceX Falcon 9, Rocket Lab Electron, Glavkosmos Soyuz, Antrix PSLV, and European Space Agency Vega.

Each Landmapper-BC spacecraft carries three separate cameras to gather 22 meter resolution imagery in the red, green, and near-infrared spectral bands. The Landmapper-HD satellite design includes a larger telescope to gather 2.5 meter resolution imagery in blue, green, red, red edge, and near-infrared spectral bands. This imagery is processed on-board and then downlinked over a miniaturized high-speed Ka-band transmitter. The common satellite bus uses reaction wheels, magnetic torque coils, star trackers, magnetometers, Sun sensors, and gyroscopes to enable precision 3-axis pointing without the use of propellant.

== Satellites ==
- Landmapper BC 1, COSPAR 2017-042Y, launched 14.07.2017 on Soyuz 2-1a rocket. Satellite failed shortly after being successfully deployed into orbit.
- Landmapper BC 2, COSPAR 2017-042X, launched 14.07.2017 on Soyuz 2-1a rocket. Satellite failed shortly after being successfully deployed into orbit.
- Landmapper HD, suborbital, launched 02.08.2017 on Vector-R rocket. Suborbital test flight of a Landmapper-HD.
- Landmapper BC 3, COSPAR 2017-F05, launched 28.11.2017 on Soyuz 2-1b rocket. Launch failure, satellite lost.
- Landmapper BC 3 v2, COSPAR 2018-004H, launched 12.01.2018 on PSLV-XL rocket.
- Landmapper BC 4, COSPAR 2018-099K, launched 03.12.2018 on Falcon-9 v1.2 (Block 5) rocket.
- Landmapper BC 5, COSPAR 2020-085C, launched 20.11.2020 on Electron rocket.

All satellites are also known by their former name Corvus (so for example Corvus BC 1 etc.)
