= CICERO-6 =

Earth observation micro-satellite

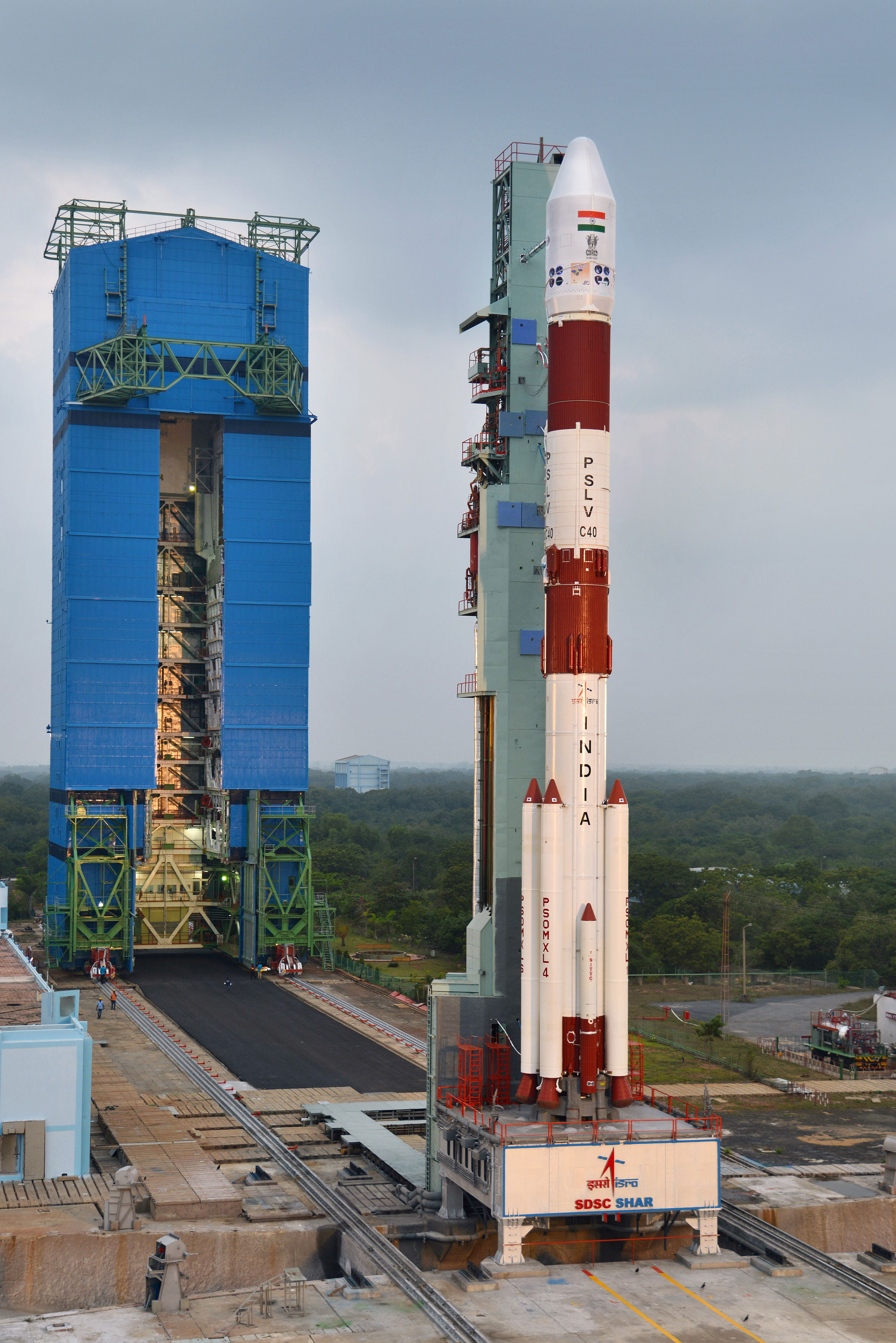
- The Polar Satellite Launch Vehicle, the model of rocket that launched CICERO-6
- Mission type: Earth observation
- Operator: GeoOptics Inc.

Spacecraft properties
- Manufacturer: Orbital Solutions Monaco
- Launch mass: 10 kg (22 lb)
- Power: 21 watts

Start of mission
- Launch date: 23 June 2017, 3:59 UTC
- Rocket: PSLV-XL
- Launch site: Sriharikota Launching Range
- Contractor: ISRO

Orbital parameters
- Regime: Low Earth orbit
- Altitude: 505 km (314 mi)
- Periapsis altitude: 407.8 km (253.4 mi)
- Apoapsis altitude: 417.1 km (259.2 mi)
- Inclination: 97.1°
- Period: 92.7 minutes

CICERO-6 (Community Initiative for Continuing Earth Radio Occultation) was a CubeSat designed and operated by GeoOptics, Inc. It was the first launched of the CICERO satellite constellation. Its purpose, as part of the constellation, was to use GPS and Galileo radio occultation (GNSS-RO) and GNSS reflectometry (GNSS-R) to provide data on Earth's atmosphere and climate. The CICERO project aimed to have a lower cost compared to other Earth observation projects.

The satellite re-entered the atmosphere on 11 June 2024.
