= ROBUSTA =

Failed French nano-satellite experiment

- Mission type: Technology
- Operator: Centre Spatial Universitaire Montpellier-Nîmes
- COSPAR ID: 2012–006H
- SATCAT no.: 38084
- Mission duration: 2 years (failed)

Spacecraft properties
- Spacecraft type: 1U CubeSat
- Launch mass: 1 kilogram (2.2 lb)

Start of mission
- Launch date: 13 February 2012, 10:00:00 UTC
- Rocket: Vega
- Launch site: Kourou ELV
- Contractor: Arianespace

Orbital parameters
- Reference system: Geocentric
- Regime: Low Earth
- Perigee altitude: 302 kilometres (188 mi)
- Apogee altitude: 1,089 kilometres (677 mi)
- Inclination: 69.47 degrees
- Period: 98.54 minutes
- Epoch: 31 October 2013, 04:52:30 UTC

ROBUSTA (Radiation on Bipolar for University Satellite Test Application) is a nano-satellite scientific experiment developed by the University of Montpellier students as part of a Centre National d'Études Spatiales (CNES) call for student projects in the field of orbital systems.

The satellite is a Cubesat, the name given to a series of nano-satellites developed as part of student projects. The ROBUSTA mission is to check the deterioration of electronic components, based on bipolar transistors, when exposed to in-flight space radiation. The results of the experiment will be used to validate a new radiation test method proposed by the laboratory.

== Implementation of the project ==
The duration of the ROBUSTA project is 6 years, beginning in 2006. The satellite was launched on February 13, 2012 on the Vega rocket's maiden flight, and reentered in the atmosphere in February 2015. An anomaly within the battery recharge system resulted in the loss of the satellite after a few days.

== Staff ==
Teams from several sites, coordinated by the Centre Spatial Universitaire Montpellier-Nîmes worked together. These teams are spread over several sites:

- The mechanical design was done by the IUT GMP of Nîmes;
- Energy management was conducted by IUT GEII of Nîmes;
- The ground segment and communication cards are supported by the IUP PGII Montpellier.
- The controller card was done by Polytech Montpellier and IUT GEII Montpellier.
- The payload is managed by the EEA department of the University of Montpellier.
