= Sky and Space Global =

Sky and Space Global (UK) Ltd
- Type: Public
- Traded as: ASX:SAS
- Industry: telecommunications
- Founded: 24 November 2015
- Founder: Meir Moalem, Meidad Pariente
- Headquarters: London, United Kingdom
- Number of locations: 4 (2017)
- Area served: Worldwide
- Key people: Meir Moalem (CEO); Meidad Pariente (CTO); Maya Glickman (COO)
- Services: satellite communications
- Website: skyandspace.co

Sky and Space Global (UK) Ltd was a British public company planning a constellation of 200 nanosatellites in equatorial Low Earth orbit for narrowband communications that it expected would cost $160 million or less to complete in total. Satellites would feature inter-satellite links and the capability to autonomously monitor and manage satellite health and the in-orbit communications network. The company had branches in the United Kingdom, Israel and Australia.

== History ==
After its incorporation in November 2015 Sky and Space Global (UK) Ltd performed a reverse merger with Burleson Energy Limited enabling a backdoor listing on the ASX and successfully completing an IPO worth $4.5 million on 31 May 2016.

On 30 August 2016 Sky and Space Global signed a service contract with its first wholesale customer, Sat-Space Africa, covering the provision of bandwidth from the three demonstration satellites ("Three Diamonds") to be launched in May 2017. Sat-Space Africa forecasts revenues from using only a minor portion of bandwidth capacity provided by the three demonstration satellites of approximately $500,000 per annum, with the potential grow up to $2 million with the full equatorial constellation in operation.

On 13 September 2016 Sky and Space Global announced a binding agreement with Virgin Galactic to secure four dedicated launch missions on the LauncherOne system from 2018 with each launch carrying multiple nanosatellites.

Through a second public offering in November 2016, which was significantly oversubscribed, Sky and Space Global raised another $7 million.

In March 2017 Sky and Space Global announced a non-binding MoU with Globalsat Group for testing and offering their satellite service in Latin America.

On 7 April 2020 an announcement was published to the ASX announcing that Sky and Space Global had entered into voluntary administration the previous day.

On 30 August 2021 Sky and Space Global was delisted by the Australian Stock Exchange as they could not meet the ongoing requirements of a good corporate citizen and also failed to pay their annual listing fees.

On 2 October 2025 the company was placed into Voluntary Administration, a second meeting on 6 November resolved that the Company be wound up and Cor Cordis appointed as Liquidators. It was announced that there would be reasonable grounds to believe that shareholders would not receive any funds from the liquidation.

== Satellites ==
Sky and Space Global satellites conformed to the CubeSat standard (3U per satellite) and were built at an estimated cost of around $500,000 per unit which did not include launch costs in the range of $200,000 to $250,000 per satellite. The satellites were placed in low Earth orbit at an altitude of 500–800 km. The satellites had a design life of five to seven years. After four years the intention was to drop them back to Earth to dispose of them. Sky and Space Global intended to replace 25 percent of the constellation each year, replacing 50 satellites with new versions. Satellites would come with a propulsion system that was non-toxic and non-hazardous in terms of explosiveness.

The first three demonstration satellites called Blue, Green and Red Diamond, or together referred to as the "Three Diamonds", were built by GomSpace and were launched by the ISRO's PSLV-XL. They immediately provided commercial services to Sat-Space Africa and BeepTool LLC.

The initial constellation of 200 satellites was to be built by GomSpace as well and launched into five orbital planes, one in equatorial and four in inclined near-equatorial orbits. Service coverage spanned from 15 degrees south latitude to 15 degrees north of the equator. Virgin Galactic had the contract to launch subsequent satellites. The company planned to provide communications services to Virgin Galactic's Cosmic Girl which was to act as launch platform for smallsat orbital launch vehicle LauncherOne.

As of December 2019, the company lowered the number of satellites planned to be launched due to funding issues, planning to launch only 8 satellites by the end of 2020.

=== Satellite list ===
Satellite Name	Configuration	Launch date / Deployment date	Launch vehicle / Host spacecraft	Purpose
Red Diamond	3U CubeSat	Launch: 23 June	PSLV-XL	prototype
Green Diamond	3U CubeSat	Launch: 23 June	PSLV-XL	prototype
Blue Diamond	3U CubeSat	Launch: 23 June	PSLV-XL	prototype

== Frequency bands ==
Sky and Space Global's constellation was planned to use spectrum in the S band and L band for mobile communication coverage, S band for inter-satellite links and again S band and UHF for mission control. On 27 September 2016 the company announced that it had received approval from the United Kingdom's Ministry of Defence to use its UHF frequencies for command and telemetry of the three demonstration satellites until the end of 2019 with the possibility to extend this timeframe.

== User terminals ==
On 20 September 2016 Flextronics Israel Ltd signed a memorandum of understanding for the design, development and production of end user devices for Sky and Space Global's narrowband communication system.

In January 2017 Ayecka Communications Systems had been contracted to build prototype hotspots, which allowed any mobile device, including tablets, to connect to the SAS satellite network using WiFi.

On 20 February 2017 Sky and Space Global announced the signing of a memorandum of understanding with SocialEco Ltd, a company that produces a low-cost smartphone set to enable digital financial inclusion of the 4 billion people living on less than $8 per day. The companies intended to explore the integration of an SAS app in SocialEco's smartphone and the development of a dedicated Android smartphone that would cost $20 and have the capability to directly connect to SAS's satellite network.
