= South-West State University =

Coordinates: 51°44′18.38″N 36°8′53.91″E

SouthWest State University
- Государственное образовательное учреждение высшего профессионального образования «Юго-западный государственный университет»
- Arms of the South-West State University
- Type: public
- Established: 1964
- Rector: Sergey Emelyanov
- Students: 10,920 (2023)
- Location: Kursk, Russia
- Campus: urban
- Website: http://www.swsu.ru/eng/index.php

University rankings

Regional – Overall
- QS Emerging Europe and Central Asia: 301-350 (2022)

South-West State University (Note: Officially Russian: Государственное образовательное учреждение высшего профессионального образования «Юго-западный государственный университет», romanized: Gosudarstvennoye obrazovatel'noye uchezhdenie vysshego progressional'nogo obrazovaniya "State Educational Institution of Higher Professional Education "South-West State University"") (YuZGU; Russian: Юго-Западный государственный университет (ЮЗГУ), Yugo-Zapadnyy gosudarstvennyy universitet) is a university located in Kursk, Russia.

South-West State University was founded in 1964 as the Kursk Politechnical Institute (Note: Russian: Курский политехнический институт, romanized: Kurskiy politekhnicheskiy institut) as the Kursk branch of a Moscow university. It was renamed Kursk State Technical University (Note: Russian: Курский государственный технический университет (КурскГТУ), romanized: Kurskiy gosudarstvennyy tekhnocheskyy universitet (KurskSTU)) in 1995 before receiving its current name in 2010.

Its current rector is Sergey Emelyanov.

== Faculties ==
As of January 2010, the university had 8 faculties. Here is the full list of faculties, according to the official web-site:

- Faculty of Innovations and Management
- Faculty of Informatics and Computer Engineering
- Faculty of Economics
- Faculty of Building and Architecture
- Faculty of Technologies and Design
- Faculty of Law
- Faculty of Mining
- Faculty of Linguistics and Cross-cultural Communications
