= USA-273 =

United States military satellite

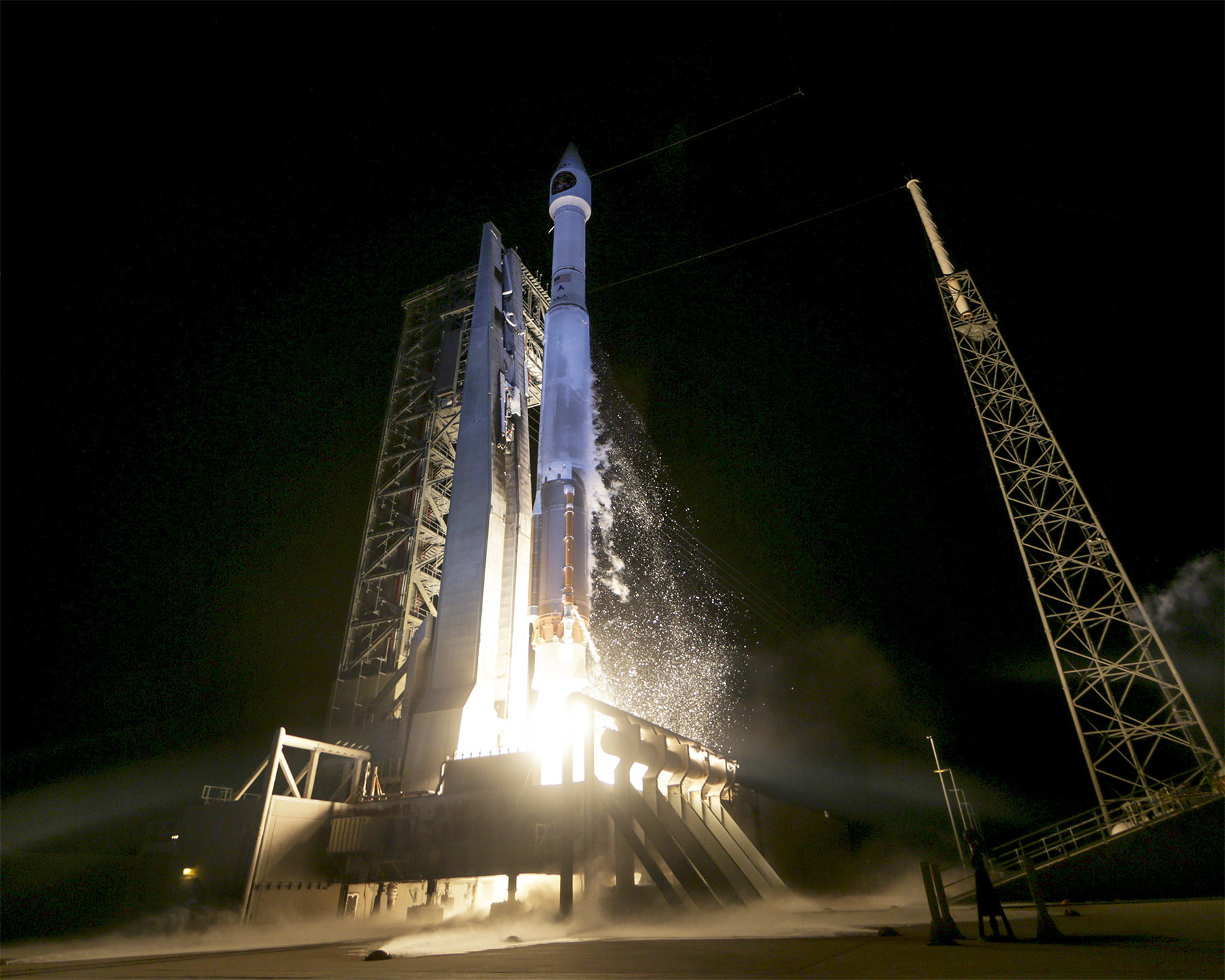
- Launch of USA-273 on an Atlas V
- Names: SBIRS GEO-3 (SV-4); Space-Based Infrared System GEOstationary-3
- Mission type: Infrared early warning IRINT
- Operator: United States Air Force / United States Space Force
- COSPAR ID: 2017-004A
- SATCAT no.: 41937
- Website: https://www.spaceforce.mil/
- Mission duration: 12 years (planned); 8 years, 8 months and 26 days (in progress)

Spacecraft properties
- Spacecraft: SBIRS GEO-3
- Spacecraft type: SBIRS GEO
- Bus: A2100M
- Manufacturer: Lockheed Martin Space
- Launch mass: 4,500 kg (9,900 lb)
- Dimensions: 15 m x 6.7 m x 6.1 m

Start of mission
- Launch date: 21 January 2017, 00:42 UTC
- Rocket: Atlas V 401 (AV-066)
- Launch site: Cape Canaveral, SLC-41
- Contractor: United Launch Alliance

Orbital parameters
- Reference system: Geocentric orbit
- Regime: Geostationary orbit

Instruments
- 2 SBIRS sensors

USA-273, also known as SBIRS GEO-3, is a United States military satellite and part of the Space-Based Infrared System (SBIRS).

== Overview of SBIRS ==
The SBIRS satellites are a replacement for the Defense Support Program (DSP) early warning system. They are intended to detect ballistic missile launches, as well as various other events in the infrared spectrum, including nuclear explosions, aircraft flights, space object entries and reentries, wildfires, and spacecraft launches.

The mission of SBIRS states that "The SBIRS program was designed to provide a seamless operational transition from DSP to SBIRS and meet jointly-defined requirements of the defense and intelligence communities in support of the missile early warning, missile defense, battlespace awareness and technical intelligence mission areas."

== Satellite description ==
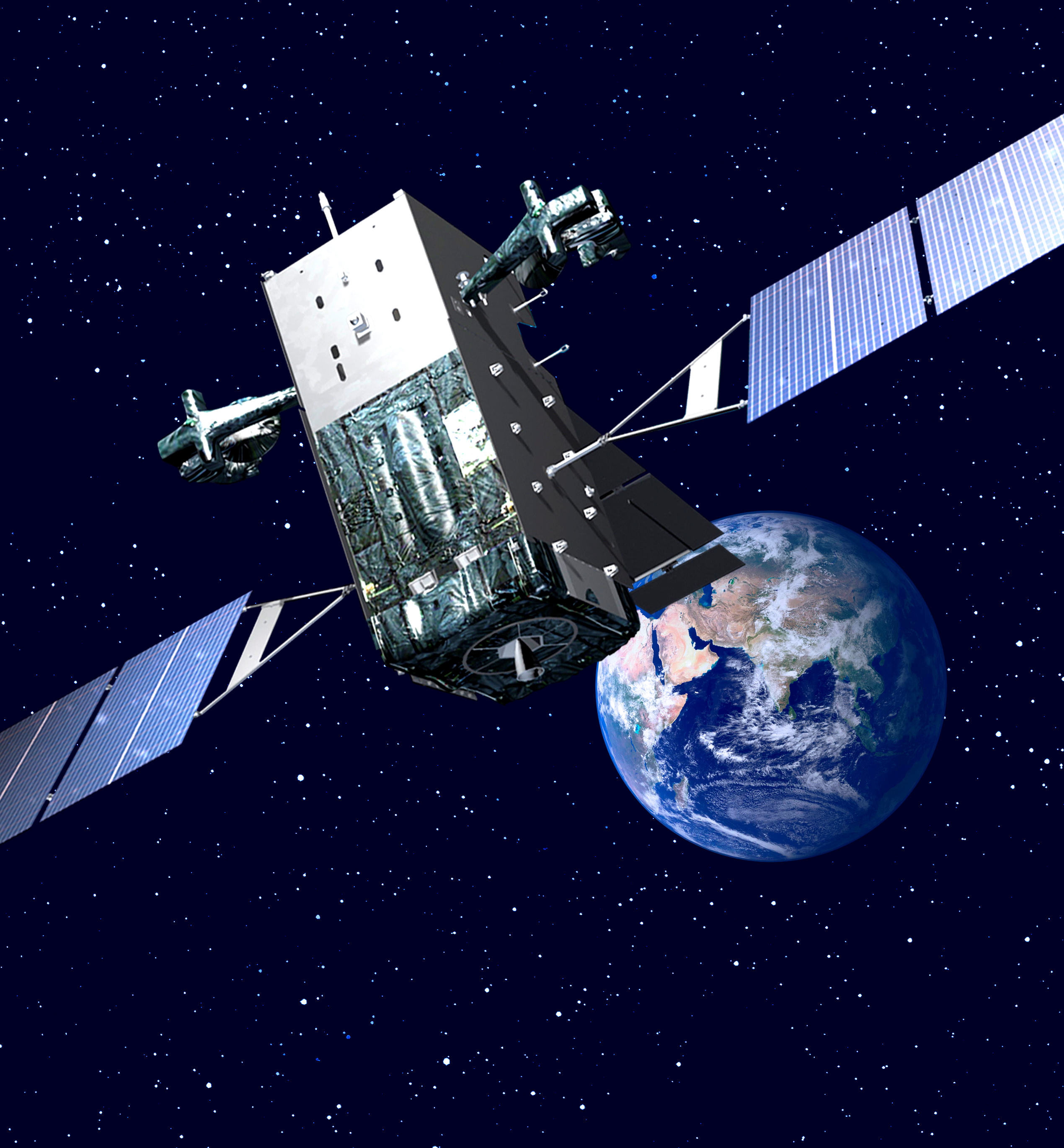
SBIRS GEO-3 in orbit

SBIRS-GEO 3 was manufactured by Lockheed Martin Space and was built upon the A2100M, a militarized, radiation hardened satellite bus that provides power, attitude control, command and control, and a communications subsystem with five separate mission data downlinks to meet mission requirements, including system survivability and endurability requirements.

== SBIRS sensors ==
The SBIRS sensors are designed to provide greater flexibility and sensitivity than the DSP infrared sensor, in addition to detecting short-wave and mid-wave infrared signals, allowing SBIRS to perform a broader set of missions. These enhanced capabilities result in improved prediction accuracy for global strategic and tactical warfighters. Improvements to the ground system processing software are on-going, resulting in increased event message accuracy and reduced manpower requirements for support and operations of the DSP and SBIRS.

The infrared payload consists of two sensors; a scanner and a step-starer. The scanning sensor continuously scans the Earth to provide 24/7 global strategic missile warning capability. Data from the scanner also contributes to theater and intelligence missions. The step-staring sensor provides coverage for theater missions and intelligence areas of interest. On-board signal processing allows detected events to be transmitted to the ground, but the raw, unprocessed data gathered by the infrared sensors are down-linked as well, so the same radiometric scene observed in space will be available for ground-based processing.

== Launch ==
USA-273 was launched on 21 January 2017 from Cape Canaveral (CCAFS) atop an Atlas V 401 launch vehicle.
