= COMPASS-2 =

COMPASS-2 (also known as DragSail-CubeSat) is the second satellite developed by students from FH Aachen and RWTH Aachen University. It has a sail to increase its drag coefficient, and was launched (with a number of other satellites) in 2017 by means of a Polar Satellite Launch Vehicle.
