= RADiations Effects on Components and Systems =

Coordinates: 43°37′59″N 3°52′2″E

Radiation Effects on Components and systems
- Founded: 1989
- Type: Professional Organization
- Purpose: Radiation effects on materials, components and systems
- Location: Montpellier, France
- Region served: Worldwide
- Method: Conferences, Publications
- Official language: French
- Key people: Philippe Calvel (current president)
- Website: radecs-association.net/

The RADECS association is a non-profit professional organization that promotes basic and applied research in the field of radiation and its effects on materials, components and systems. The acronym RADECS stands for "RADiations Effects on Components and Systems.

== History ==
The first “Radiation and its Effects on Components and Systems" (RADECS) conference was held in Montpellier, France in 1989 as a French national conference. In 1991, the members of the organizing committee expanded the scope of RADECS to become a European conference. Since then, the RADECS Conference and RADECS Workshop have run in alternate years.

The activities of the RADECS association are as follows:

- RADECS biannual European Conference
- Biannual Technical Workshop
- Promote research activities on radiation effects due to charged, un-charged particles and ionizing radiation
- Scientific publications or promotion of scientific publications
- Cooperation and exchange with other organizations (e.g. IEEE Nuclear and Plasma Sciences Society)

== RADECS conferences ==
The RADECS conference and workshops address technical issues related to radiation effects on devices, integrated circuits, sensors, and systems, as well as radiation hardening, testing, and environmental modeling methods. Papers from the events are published in a biennial issue of the IEEE Transactions on Nuclear Science journal.
