= Kanopus-V-IK =

Russian Earth observation satellite

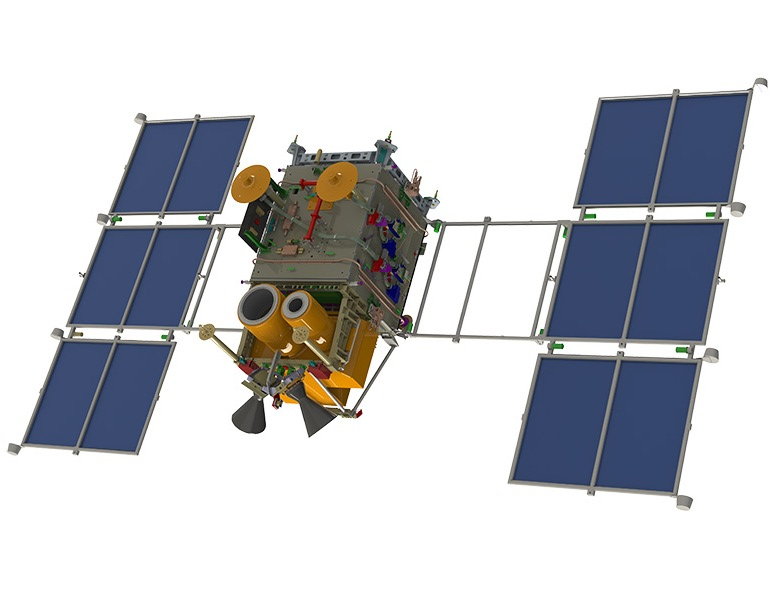
- Illustration of the Kanopus spacecraft
- Names: Kanopus-V 2
- Mission type: Earth observation
- Operator: Roscosmos; Roshydromet
- COSPAR ID: 2017-042A
- SATCAT no.: 42825
- Mission duration: 5 years (planned); 8 years, 4 months and 9 days (elapsed)

Spacecraft properties
- Bus: Kanopus
- Manufacturer: NPO VNIIEM
- Launch mass: ~600 kg (1,300 lb)
- Power: 300W

Start of mission
- Launch date: July 14, 2017; 12:36 West Kazakhstan Time (06:36 UTC)
- Rocket: Soyuz-2.1a/Fregat
- Launch site: Baikonur Cosmodrome Site 31

Orbital parameters
- Reference system: Geocentric
- Regime: Low Earth
- Semi-major axis: 6,884 km (4,278 mi)
- Periapsis altitude: 512.7 km (318.6 mi)
- Apoapsis altitude: 515.2 km (320.1 mi)
- Inclination: 97.4°
- Period: 94.8 minutes

Instruments
- Panchromatic Imaging System, Multispectral Imaging System, Multispectral Scanner Unit-IK-SR

Kanopus-V-IK (formerly Kanopus-V 2) is a Russian Earth observation satellite developed by the All-Russian Scientific Research Institute of Electromechanics and operated by Roscosmos. It was launched on July 14, 2017, designed for monitoring the environment over a large swath of land, and has an expected service life of 5 years.

== Design ==
Kanopus-V-IK's mission is to collect data for environmental monitoring and mapping, detection of fires, agricultural planning, and assessing land use. It can also be used to monitor man-made and natural disasters. The satellite uses the Kanopus satellite bus. It was originally built as Kanopus-V 2 but was modified to include an infrared detection capability.

Kanopus-V-IK contains several instruments. The Panchromatic Imaging System (PSS) collects black-and-white images for monitoring the environment and covers a ground swath of 23.3 km (14.5 mi). The Multispectral Imaging System (MSS) covers four spectral bands. The green wavelengths are used for vegetation monitoring and the red to near-infrared wavelengths for fire and hotspot detection. The Multispectral Scanner Unit-IK-SR (MSU-IK-SRM) aids in fire detection over a 2,000 km (1,200 mi) swath of the Earth's surface, while having a minimal revisit time due to the satellite's low orbit.

== Launch ==
Kanopus-V-IK launched from Baikonur Cosmodrome Site 31 on July 14, 2017, at 12:36 local time (06:36 UTC) on board a Soyuz-2.1a rocket. It was launched with over 70 other satellites in a satellite rideshare mission. It contained 48 CubeSats for Planet Labs. They were launched to a low Earth orbit with a perigee of 512.7 km (318.6 mi), an apogee of 515.2 km (320.1 mi), and an inclination of 97.4°.
