= Paul L. Hertz =

American astrophysicist

Paul Louis Hertz
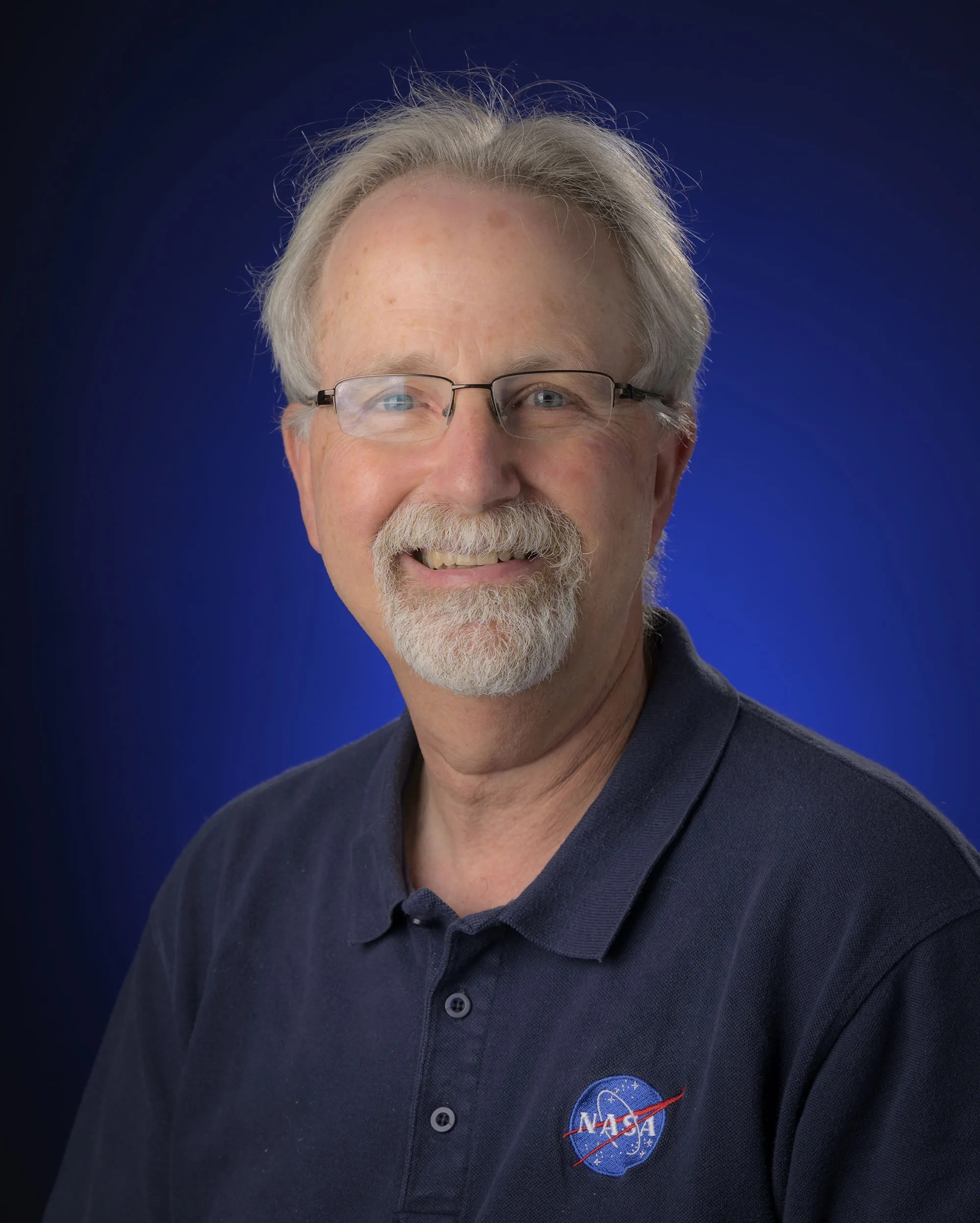
- Born: Eglin Air Force Base, Florida, United States
- Education: Harvard University, Massachusetts Institute of Technology
- Known for: Director of the Astrophysics Division, NASA (2012–2022)
- Scientific career
- Fields: Astronomy
- Workplaces: NASA, Naval Research Laboratory
- Thesis: Surveys of Globular Cluster and Galactic Plane X-Ray Sources (1983)
- Website: https://science.nasa.gov/about-us/leadership/dr-paul-hertz

Paul Louis Hertz is an American astrophysicist and is best known for being the longest-serving director of the Astrophysics Division at NASA, with a tenure from 2012 to 2022.

== Early life and education ==
Hertz grew up in Atlanta and attended the Galloway School, which presented him its 2014 Galloway ALUMinaries Award. Hertz studied both physics and mathematics at the Massachusetts Institute of Technology, earning a bachelor's degree in both. He was awarded the PhD in Astronomy in 1983 from Harvard University, with a thesis titled "Surveys of Globular Cluster and Galactic Plane X-Ray Sources". Hertz received the Robert Trumpler award of the Astronomical Society of the Pacific for his thesis in 1985.

== Career ==
After completing the PhD, Hertz was awarded a National Research Council research associateship at the Naval Research Laboratory in Washington, D.C., from 1983 to 1985. He continued there as an astrophysicist, where his research concentrated on X-ray emission from galactic neutron stars, black holes, and globular clusters. While there, he won the Alan Berman Research Publication Award of the Naval Research Laboratory. During that time, he continued academic affiliations by teaching at Northern Virginia Community College from 1990 to 1992, Prince George's Community College in 1991, and George Mason University from 1993 to 2001.

Dr. Hertz joined NASA as a Senior Scientist in 2000 in the Astrophysics Division, where he served as a program scientist for several NASA programs and projects including the Structure and Evolution of the Universe Program, the Explorer Program, the Chandra X-ray Observatory, and the Discovery Program. One of his longest-term roles was as the program scientist for the SOFIA airborne observatory, overseeing it in its later development and first light in 2010. He then served as the chief scientist of the NASA Science Directorate from 2005 to 2012. In this role, he oversaw the NASA's Science Policy, Process, and Ethics Office. He received the Presidential Rank Award of Distinguished Executive, the Presidential Rank Award of Meritorious Senior Professional, the NASA Distinguished Service Medal, the NASA Outstanding Leadership Medal, a NASA Silver Achievement Medal, and multiple NASA Group Achievement Awards.

In 2012, Hertz became the director of the Astrophysics Division. Among his earliest actions was the announcement of the opportunity to consider using repurposed telescope components for the Nancy Grace Roman Space Telescope (then WFIRST) mission. Around the same time, he announced the cancellation of the Gravity and Extreme Magnetism Small Explorer, saying the technology needed for the instrument was taking longer to develop than expected, driving up the price. He also made the commitment for NASA to provide infrared detectors and science support to the ESA-led Euclid mission.

During his tenure, he was a repeated advocate for multi-billion-dollar "flagship" missions, including leading the formal new start for Roman, funding four major competing flagship studies, and encouraging ambitious mission planning. NASA also launched NuSTAR, NICER, TESS, IXPE, and JWST during his tenure.

In 2021, Hertz announced that he would step down in 2022 after 10 years as Director of Astrophysics, saying "It is my personal belief that 10 years is long enough for a single person to guide an organization, a program and a community." In August 2022, he was appointed Senior Advisor to the Associate Administrator for NASA's Science Mission Directorate.

== Personal life ==
A fan of baseball and in particular the Washington Nationals, he threw out the opening pitch on September 1, 2012. He won the Baltimore Orioles Heavy Hitter Award and the Washington Nationals Spirit Award. He is also a published sabremetrician, having proven that there have been a statistically expected number of games played where all seven ways of reaching first base occurred.
