= Gresham Building =

Demolished historic buildings in Atlanta, US

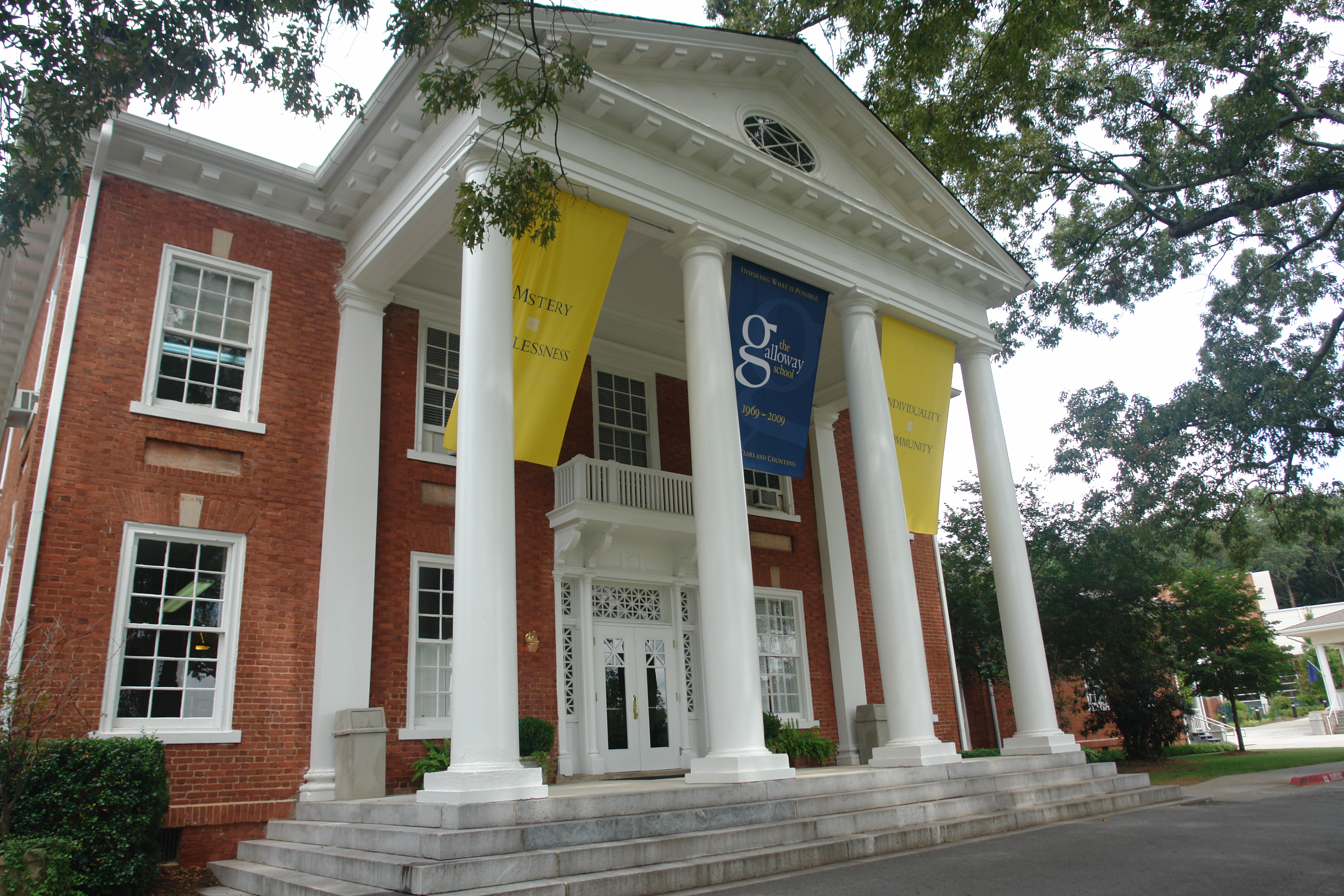
- Gresham Building in 2013

General information
- Status: Demolished
- Location: Atlanta, Georgia, US
- Coordinates: 33.87489°N 84.39367°W
- Year built: 1911
- Demolished: August 8, 2024

The Gresham Building was a historic American landmark in Atlanta, Georgia, part of The Galloway School. It was built in 1911 and demolished in 2024.

== History ==
Built in 1911, the building was registered on the National Register of Historic Places since 2014. It previously served as the former Fulton County Almshouse, before being incorporated in the Galloway School in 1969.

=== Demolition ===
The Galloway School had planned to demolish the historic Gresham Building since 2023, as part of its campus renovation. Despite recognizing its historical significance, the school cited challenges with the building's structural integrity, functionality, and sustainability as reasons for its removal. Preservationists, including the Georgia Trust for Historic Preservation, urged the school to reconsider and explore adaptive reuse options, but the school decided to proceed with the demolition while incorporating some elements into the new structure. The demolition ended up being delayed.

The historic Gresham Building on the Galloway School campus in Buckhead was unexpectedly demolished on August 8, 2024, despite efforts from local residents, alumni, and preservationists to save it. The school administrators deemed it unsafe for students. Despite various petitions to prevent it, demolition occurred just before a city zoning meeting about the school's redevelopment plans, which include replacing the Gresham Building with a modern facility as part of a broader campus renovation.

== See also ==
- The Galloway School
