= X-ray polarimetry =

Measurement of X-ray polarization

X-ray polarimetry is the measurement of the polarization of X-rays from astronomical sources. This technique provides information about emission mechanisms, magnetic field structures, and source geometry that cannot be obtained through traditional X-ray spectroscopy, imaging, or timing observations.

== History ==
Polarization of X-rays was found in 1904 by Charles Glover Barkla. Astronomical X-ray sources were found in 1962, by Riccardo Giacconi and Bruno Rossi. X-ray polarimetry was first used in astronomy in 1968 when Robert Novick, working with Roger Angel and Martin C. Weisskopf at Columbia University, launched the first sounding rocket experiment to measure polarization from Scorpius X-1 using a lithium Compton scattering polarimeter, though this initial attempt yielded only upper limits.

The first successful detection came from the Crab Nebula using improved rocket-borne instruments that combined lithium scattering polarimeters with Bragg crystal polarimeters. This measurement, reporting 15±5% polarization at 156±10°, confirmed the synchrotron radiation origin of the Crab's X-ray emission.

Ariel 5 satellite with a spectro-polarimeter was launched in 1974; the OSO-8 satellite, launched in 1975, carried two graphite crystal polarimeters and made the most significant early measurement, detecting 19±1% polarization from the Crab Nebula at 156.4±1.4°, well above the theoretical limit for thermal radiation (higher than the Chandrasekhar limit of 12%).

== Techniques ==
Early X-ray polarimeters used two main approaches:

1. Scattering polarimeters exploit the polarization dependence of Compton scattering in materials like lithium
2. Crystal polarimeters use Bragg diffraction from mosaic crystals, typically pyrolytic graphite, at 45° incidence angles

Modern instruments employ photoelectric polarimeters that image the tracks of photoelectrons ejected during photoelectric absorption. The direction of the photoelectron track correlates with the incident X-ray polarization direction. These detectors use either gas electron multipliers with pixelated readouts or time projection chambers.

== Missions and instruments ==
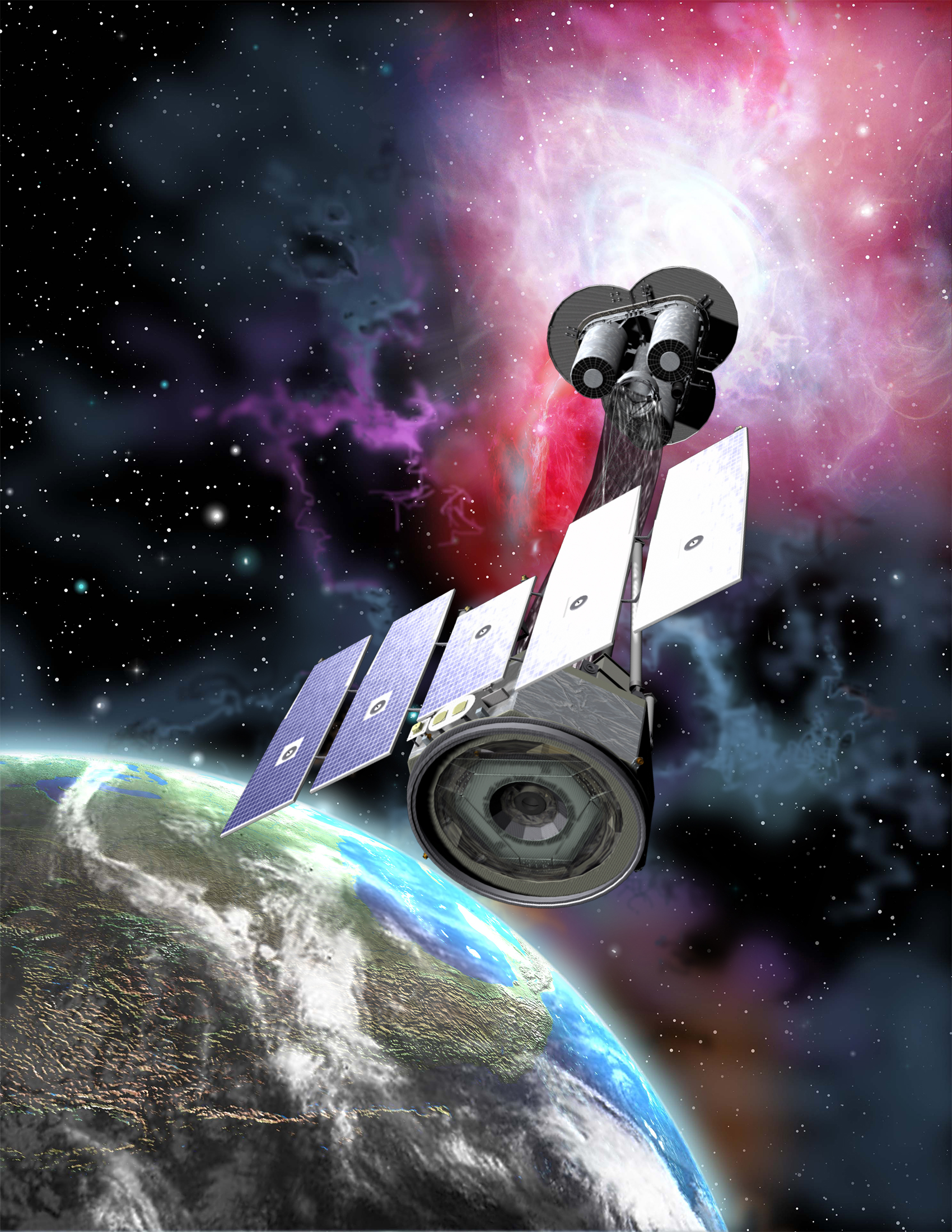
IXPE

After OSO-8, X-ray polarimetry experienced a 40-year gap due to the mismatch between polarimetry requirements and the development of focusing X-ray optics.

- Spectrum Roentgen-Gamma - a Soviet spacecraft planned with the American-Italian Stellar X-ray Polarimeter on board, cancelled in 1988
- Gravity and Extreme Magnetism Small Explorer - cancelled in 2012
- PoGOLite (2013) / PoGO+ (2018) - balloon-borne hard X-ray polarimeter that observed the Crab and Cygnus X-1
- Imaging X-ray Polarimetry Explorer (IXPE) - launched December 2021, uses gas pixel detectors at the focus of three X-ray telescopes. Martin C. Weisskopf, who took part in first sounding rocket experiments with Novick, is the PI of the mission.
- XPoSat (X-ray Polarimeter Satellite) - Indian space probe launched in 2024
- Enhanced X-ray Timing and Polarimetry mission (eXTP) - planned Chinese mission with four polarimetry telescopes, planned to be launched in 2027

== Scientific applications ==
Different astronomical objects can emit X-rays with specific polarization patterns. These signatures can provide data for measurements that can be done by other methods, for example "in accreting millisecond pulsars ... variations of the polarization angle with the pulsar phase allow us to measure source inclination and magnetic obliquity ... [which] give a possibility to measure NS mass-radius relation from the pulse profiles with a much better accuracy".

For different objects, X-ray polarimetry allows to measure different properties: black hole spin measurements through polarization rotation in curved spacetime; neutron star magnetic field geometry and emission regions; active galactic nuclei jet structures and accretion disk properties; supernova remnants and pulsar wind nebulae magnetic field configurations.

The polarization degree and angle depend on the physical processes producing the X-rays and the geometry of the emitting region, making it complementary to other observational techniques.
