= Neutron Star Interior Composition Explorer =

NASA telescope on International Space Station

NICER
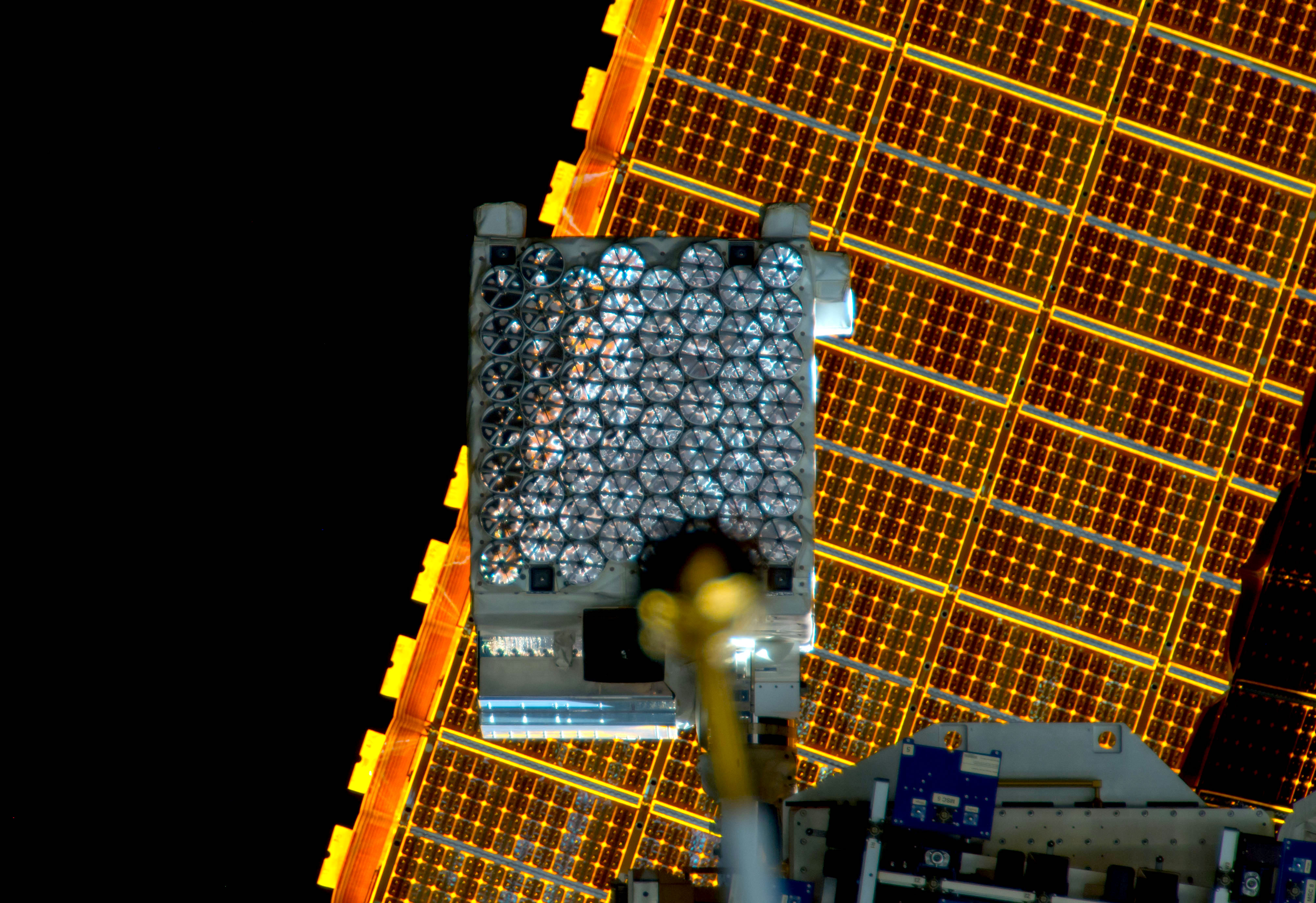
- NICER telescope mounted on the Integrated Truss Structure of the International Space Station
- Mission type: Neutron star astrophysics
- Operator: NASA / GSFC / MIT
- Website: https://heasarc.gsfc.nasa.gov/docs/nicer/
- Mission duration: 18 months (planned); 9 years, 3 months and 20 days (in progress)

Spacecraft properties
- Launch mass: 372 kg (820 lb)

Start of mission
- Launch date: 3 June 2017, 21:07:38 UTC
- Rocket: Falcon 9 Full Thrust, B1035.1
- Launch site: Kennedy Space Center, LC-39A
- Contractor: SpaceX

Orbital parameters
- Reference system: Geocentric orbit
- Regime: Low Earth orbit
- Perigee altitude: 402 km (250 mi)
- Apogee altitude: 407 km (253 mi)
- Inclination: 51.64°
- Period: 92.66 minutes

Instruments
- X-ray Timing Instrument (XTI)
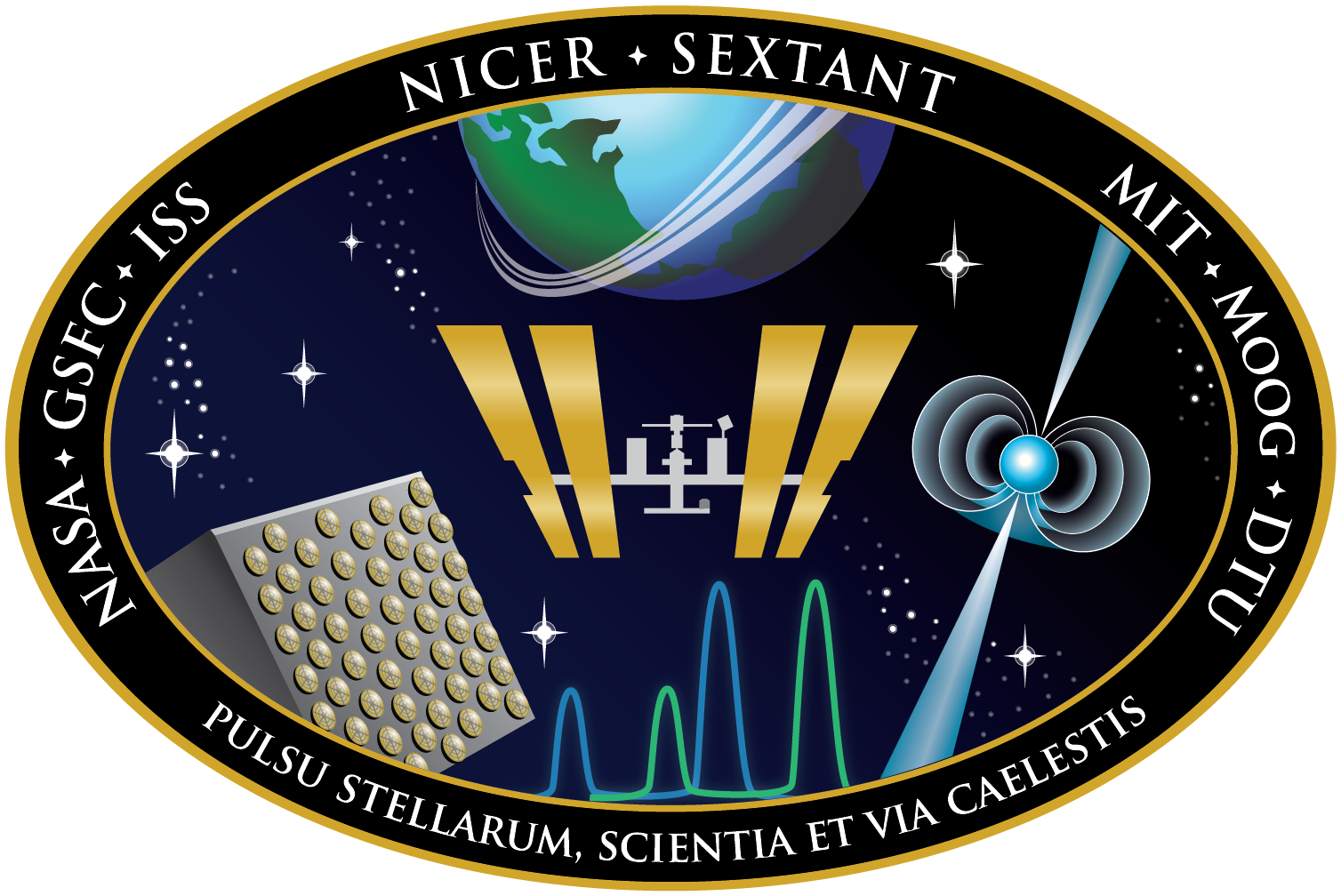
- NICER * SEXTANT mission patch Explorer program

The Neutron Star Interior Composition Explorer (NICER) is a NASA telescope on the International Space Station, designed and dedicated to the study of the extraordinary gravitational, electromagnetic, and nuclear physics environments embodied by neutron stars, exploring the exotic states of matter where density and pressure are higher than in atomic nuclei. As part of NASA's Explorer program, NICER enabled rotation-resolved spectroscopy of the thermal and non-thermal emissions of neutron stars in the soft X-ray (0.2–12 keV) band with unprecedented sensitivity, probing interior structure, the origins of dynamic phenomena, and the mechanisms that underlie the most powerful cosmic particle accelerators known. NICER achieved these goals by deploying, following the launch, and activation of X-ray timing and spectroscopy instruments. NICER was selected by NASA to proceed to formulation phase in April 2013.

NICER-SEXTANT uses the same instrument to test X-ray timing for positioning and navigation, and MXS is a test of X-ray timing communication. In January 2018, X-ray navigation was demonstrated using NICER on ISS.

In May 2023, NICER's thermal shields developed a leak that allowed stray light to enter the telescope. A repair kit containing specialized patches was delivered to the station by the Cygnus NG-21 resupply mission in August 2024, and were applied by Nick Hague in a January 16, 2025 spacewalk.

The NICER team suspended science observations on June 17, 2025 due to an issue with the motor used to point the telescope.

== Launch ==
By May 2015, NICER was on track for a 2016 launch, having passed its critical design review (CDR) and resolved an issue with the power being supplied by the ISS. Following the loss of SpaceX CRS-7 in June 2015, which delayed future missions by several months, NICER was finally launched on 3 June 2017, with the SpaceX CRS-11 ISS resupply mission aboard a Falcon 9 v1.2 launch vehicle.

== Science instrument ==
NICER's primary science instrument, called the X-ray Timing Instrument (XTI), is an array of 56 X-ray photon detectors. These detectors record the energies of the collected photons as well as their time of arrival. A Global Positioning System (GPS) receiver enables accurate timing and positioning measurements. X-ray photons can be time-tagged with a precision of less than 300 ns. In August 2022 a fast X-ray follow-up observation program was started with the MAXI instrument named "OHMAN (On-orbit Hookup of MAXI and NICER)" to detect sudden bursts in X-ray phenomena.

During each ISS orbit, NICER will observe two to four targets. Gimbaling and a star tracker allow NICER to track specific targets while collecting science data. In order to achieve its science objectives, NICER will take over 15 million seconds of exposures over an 18-month period.

== X-ray navigation and communication experiments ==
An enhancement to the NICER mission, the Station Explorer for X-ray Timing and Navigation Technology (SEXTANT), will act as a technology demonstrator for X-ray pulsar-based navigation (XNAV) techniques that may one day be used for deep-space navigation.

=== XCOM ===
As part of NICER testing, a rapid-modulation X-ray device was developed called Modulated X-ray Source (MXS), which is being used to create an X-ray communication system (XCOM) demonstration. If approved and installed on the ISS, XCOM will transmit data encoded into X-ray bursts to the NICER platform, which may lead to the development of technologies that allow for gigabit bandwidth communication throughout the Solar System. As of February 2019 the XCOM test is scheduled for spring 2019. XCOM (inc MXS) was delivered to the ISS in May 2019. Once the test was complete XCOM and the STP-H6 payload malfunctioned in September 2021. It was removed in November 2021 and disposed of on Cygnus NG-16.

== Selected results ==
In May 2018, NICER discovered an X-ray pulsar in the fastest stellar orbit yet discovered. The pulsar and its companion star were found to orbit each other every 38 minutes.

On 21 August 2019 (UTC; 20 August in the U.S.), NICER spotted the brightest X-ray burst so far observed. It came from the neutron star SAX J1808.4−3658 about 11,000 light-years from Earth in the constellation Sagittarius.

Astronomers using NICER found evidence that a neutron star from a low-mass X-ray binary in NGC 6624 is spinning at 716 Hz (times per second), or 42,960 revolutions per minute, the same velocity as the fastest known spinning neutron star PSR J1748−2446ad and the only one in such a binary system.

== Gallery ==
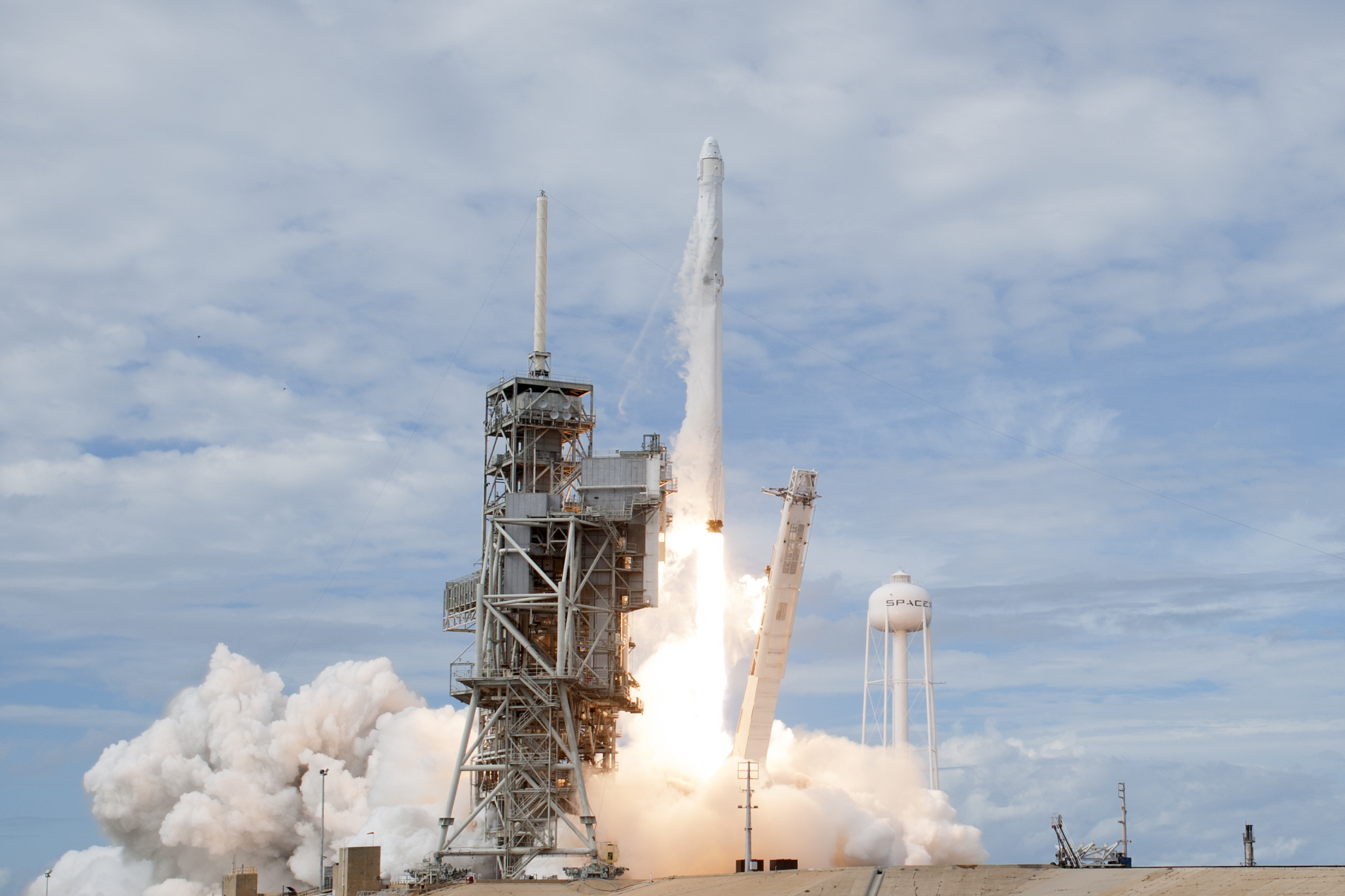
Launch of CRS-11 with NICER aboard

NICER extracted from Dragon's trunk at ISS

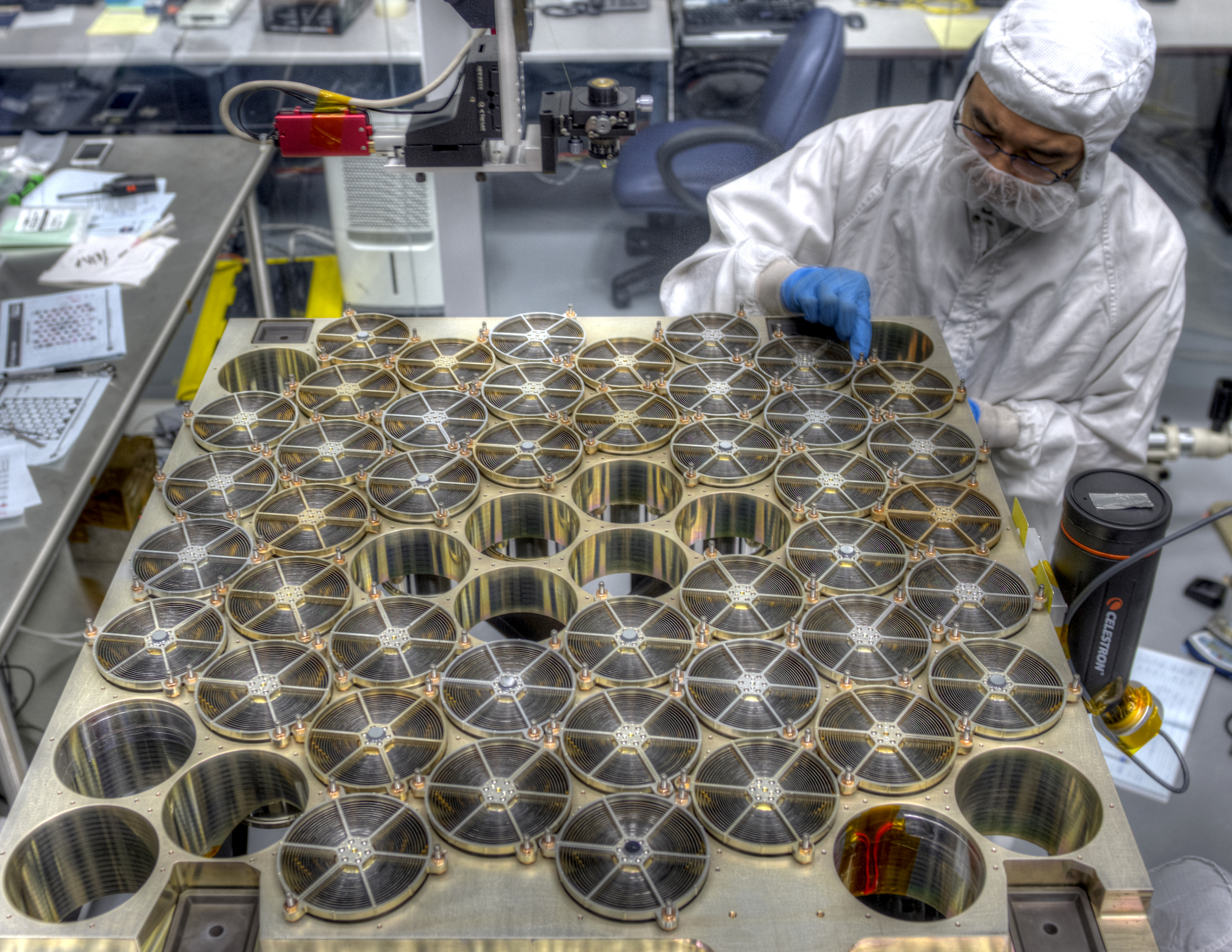
Array of X-ray lenses

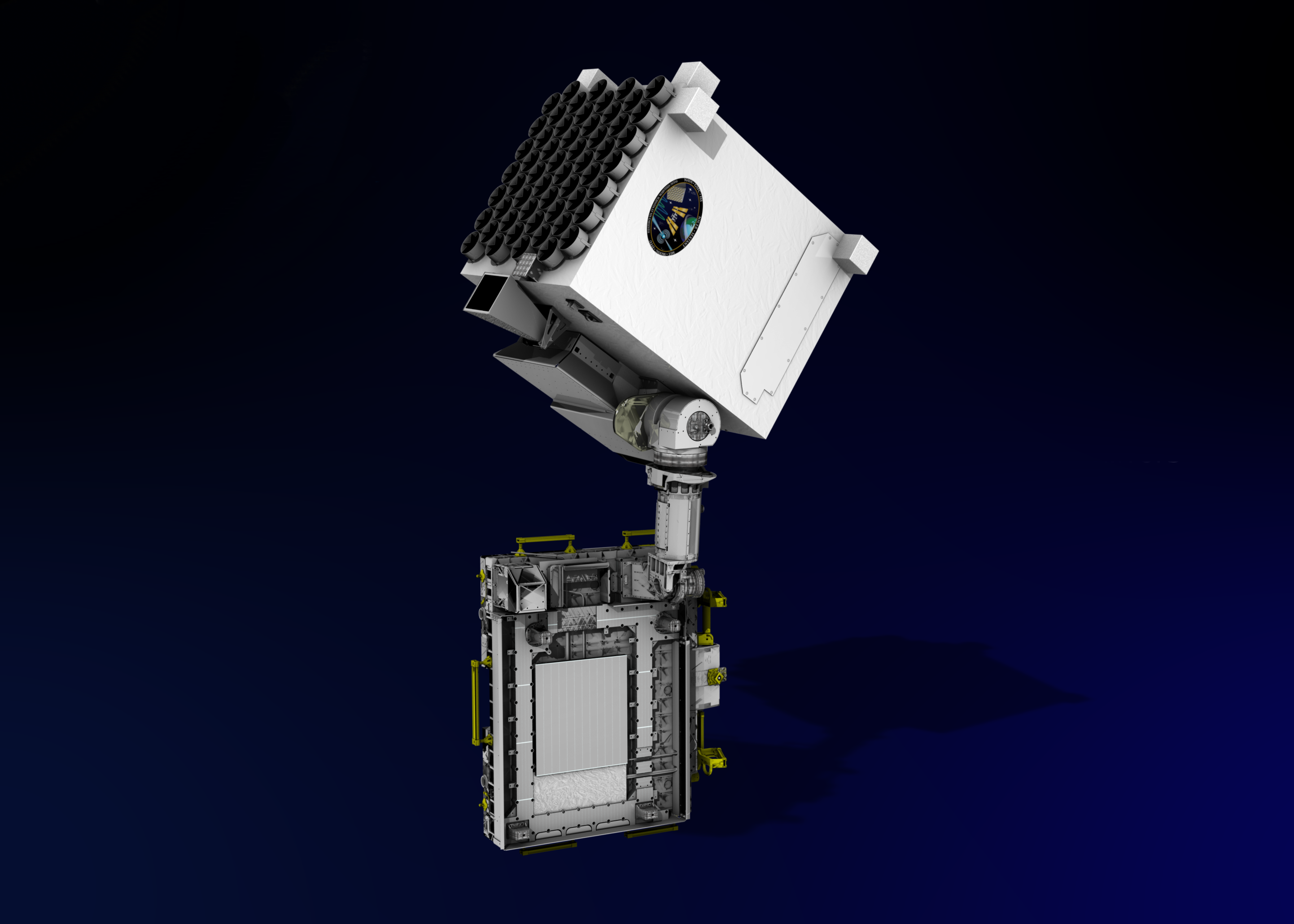
Full instrument view

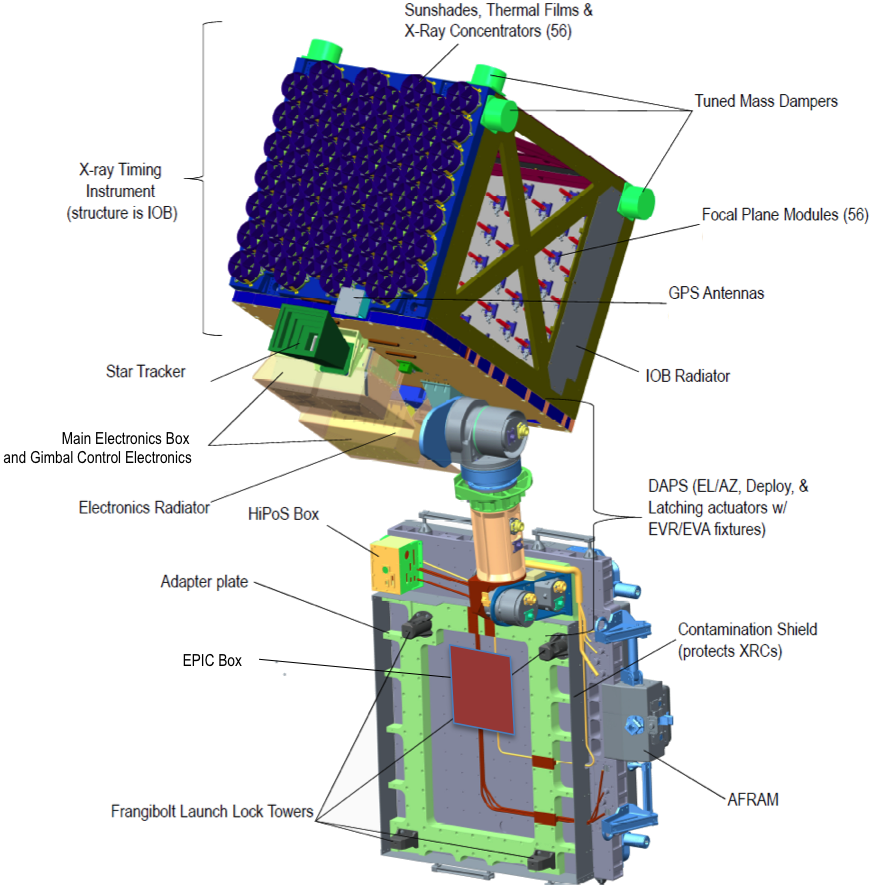
Labeled diagram of NICER

== See also ==
- Explorer program
- Chandra X-ray Observatory, NASA's flagship space observatory for X-rays, in orbit since 1999
- List of X-ray space telescopes
- Scientific research on the International Space Station
- NuSTAR, NASA Explorer-class hard X-ray space observatory, in orbit since 2012
- Rossi X-ray Timing Explorer, an X-ray timing space observatory, active 1995–2012
- X-ray telescope
- XMM-Newton, ESA X-ray space observatory, in orbit since 1999
