= NGC 6624 =

Globular cluster located in the constellation Sagittarius

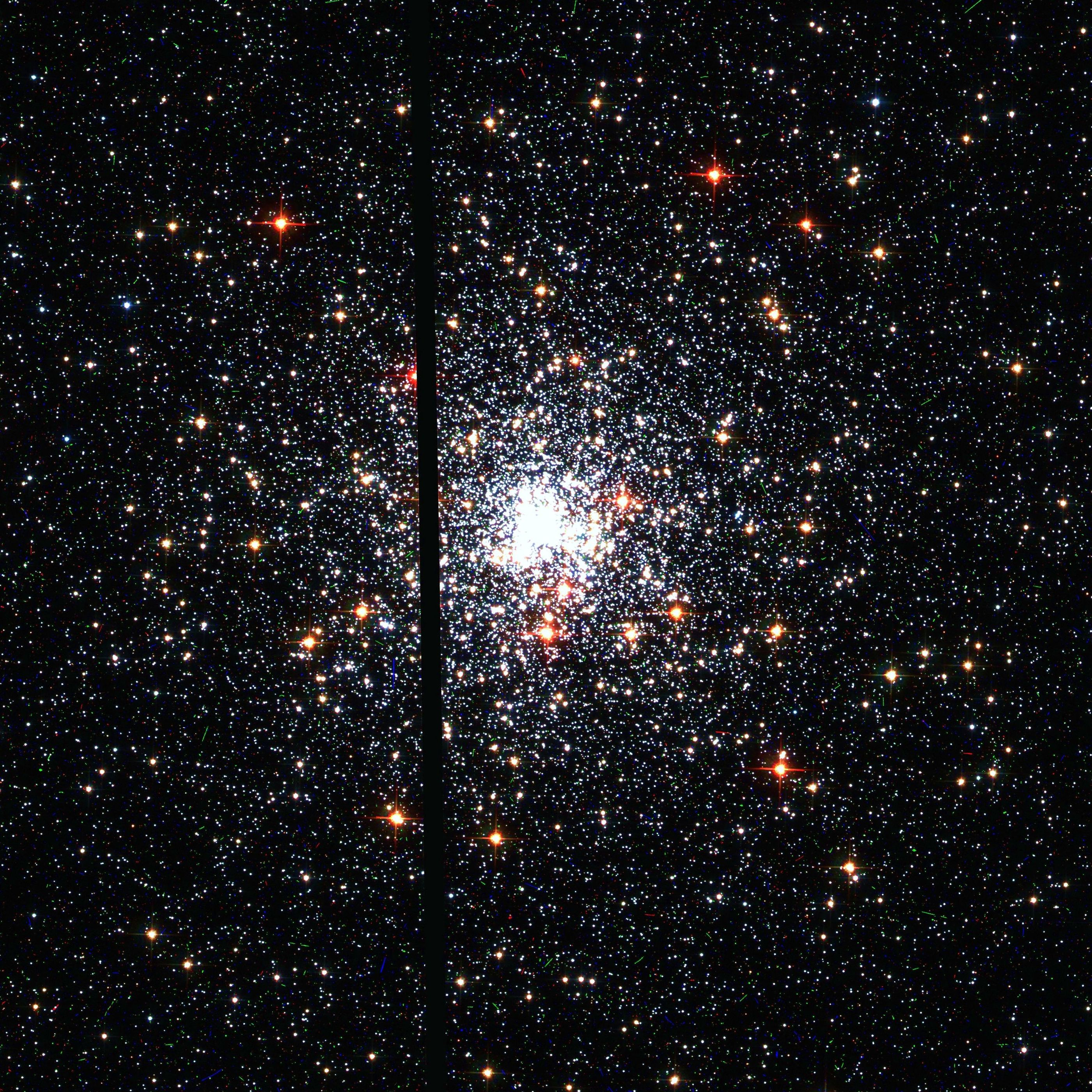
- The globular cluster NGC 6624. Credit Hubble Space Telescope

Observation data (J2000 epoch)
- Class: VI
- Constellation: Sagittarius
- Right ascension: 18^{h} 23^{m} 41^{s}
- Declination: −30° 21′ 39″
- Distance: 25.8 ± 1.1 kly (7.91 ± 0.34 kpc)
- Apparent magnitude (V): 7.6
- Apparent dimensions (V): 8.8 arcminutes

Physical characteristics
- Metallicity: [Fe/H] = −0.56 ± 0.27 dex
- Other designations: ESO 457-11, GCl 93, CD−30 15631, CPD−30 5486, HD 168943

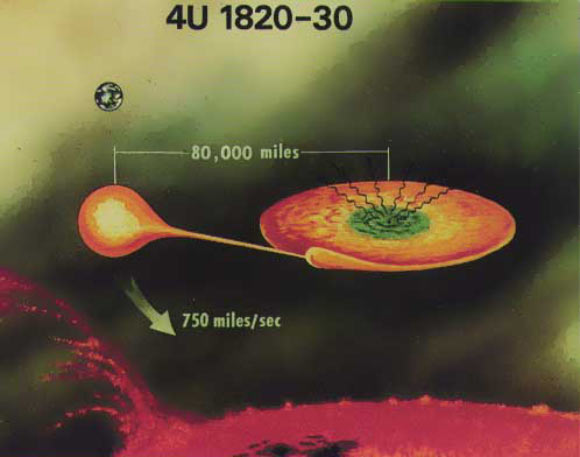
The 4U 1820-30 system, consisting of a neutron star and a white dwarf, compared to the Earth and the Sun (bottom). The neutron star is tied with PSR J1748−2446ad as the fastest rotating pulsar known, both making 716 revolutions per second.

NGC 6624 is a globular cluster in the constellation Sagittarius. It was discovered on 24 June 1784 by the astronomer William Herschel. It is given an apparent magnitude of 7.6 to 8.5. Six pulsars are known in NGC 6624. The first of these to be discovered was PSR J1823-3021A. This globular cluster also contains 4U 1820-30, a low-mass X-ray binary with an orbital period of only 11.5 minutes, consisting of a neutron star and a white dwarf. Astronomers using the NICER instrument have found evidence that the neutron star is spinning at 716 Hz (times per second), or 42,960 revolutions per minute, the same velocity as the fastest known spinning neutron star PSR J1748−2446ad and the only one in such a system.

NGC 6624 is visible as a hazy spot with a small telescope, and appears as a star-like object with binoculars. Its core appears significantly condensed. It is located 0.8 degrees southeast of the star Delta Sagittarii, and is about 1.17 kpc (3.8 kly) from the Galactic Center.

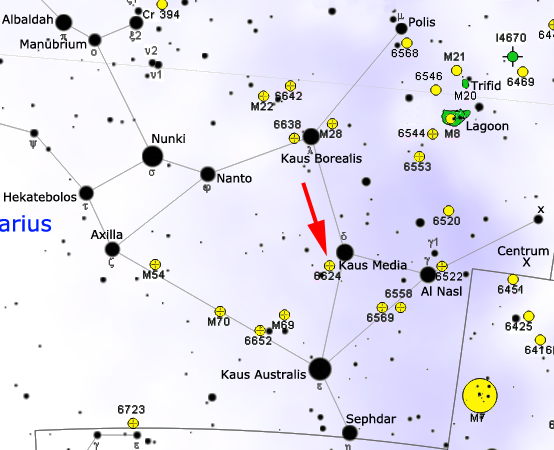
Map showing location of NGC 6624
