= Gravity and Extreme Magnetism Small Explorer =

Cancelled NASA satellite of the Explorer program

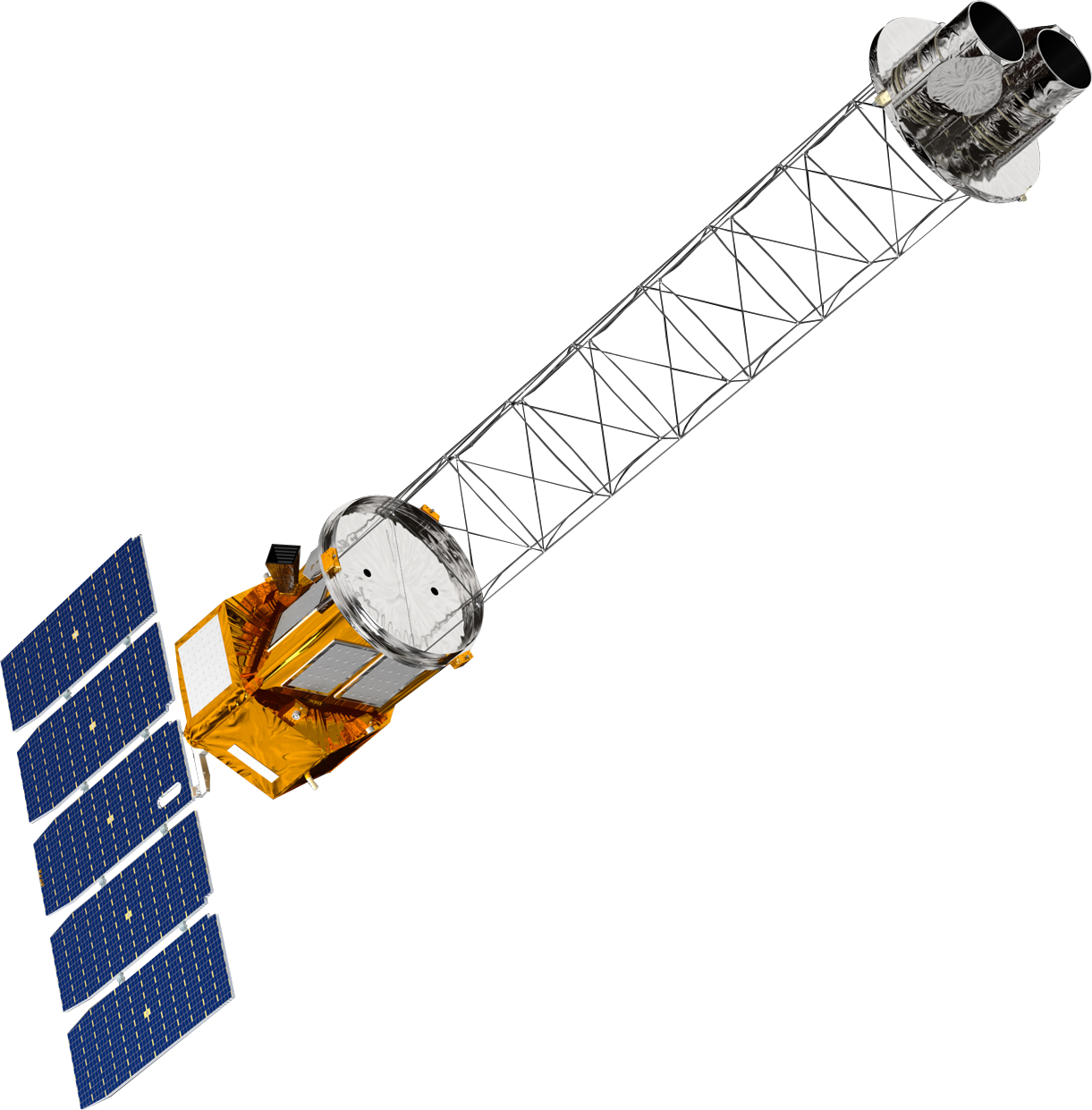
- Artist's impression of GEMS satellite
- Names: Explorer; GEMS; SMEX-13
- Mission type: X-ray polarimetry
- Operator: NASA
- Website: https://gems.gsfc.nasa.gov/
- Mission duration: 9 months (planned); 15 months (possible extension)

Spacecraft properties
- Spacecraft: Explorer
- Spacecraft type: Gravity and Extreme Magnetism Small Explorer
- Bus: LEOStar-2/750
- Manufacturer: Orbital Sciences Corporation; Alliant Techsystems
- Launch mass: 289 kg (637 lb)
- Dimensions: 7.12 × 2.73 m (23.4 × 9.0 ft)

Start of mission
- Launch date: July 2014 (planned) (cancelled)
- Rocket: Pegasus XL
- Launch site: Cape Canaveral, Stargazer
- Contractor: Orbital Sciences Corporation

Orbital parameters
- Reference system: Geocentric orbit (planned)
- Regime: Low Earth orbit
- Perigee altitude: 575 km (357 mi)
- Apogee altitude: 575 km (357 mi)
- Inclination: 28.50°
- Period: 95.00 minutes

Instruments
- X-ray Polarimeter Instrument

Gravity and Extreme Magnetism Small Explorer (GEMS or SMEX-13) mission was a NASA space observatory mission. The main scientific goal of GEMS was to be the first mission to systematically measure the polarization of X-ray sources. GEMS would have provided data to help scientists study the shape of spacetime that has been distorted by a spinning black hole's gravity and the structure and effects of the magnetic fields around neutron stars. It was cancelled by NASA in June 2012 for potential cost overruns due to delays in developing the technology and never moved into the development phase.

GEMS was managed by the NASA Goddard Space Flight Center (GSFC). The project was an astrophysics program reporting to NASA's Science Mission Directorate (SMD) in Washington, D.C.

Cancelled missions can be reinstated - for example, NuSTAR was cancelled in 2006, but reinstated a year later and launched in June 2012. However, NuSTAR was not cancelled due to project overruns, but rather due to changes in the overall NASA budget, so the circumstances for cancellation were very different. Small missions of the Explorer program offer much flexibility and launch opportunities, and the lessons learned can be applied to the same missions goals, but on a different mission (compare, for instance, Vanguard 1 to Explorer 1). Several years later two new X-ray polarimetry missions won a NASA award to develop X-ray polarimetry missions. NASA's IXPE X-ray polarimetry telescope was launched in 2021; its X-ray observational capabilities and mission objectives are very similar to those (proposed) of the GEMS.

== Launch ==
The spacecraft would have been launched in July 2014 on a nine-month mission with a possible 15-month extension for a guest observer phase; but the mission was terminated at the Confirmation Review stage on 10 May 2012 due to expected cost overruns.

== Mission ==
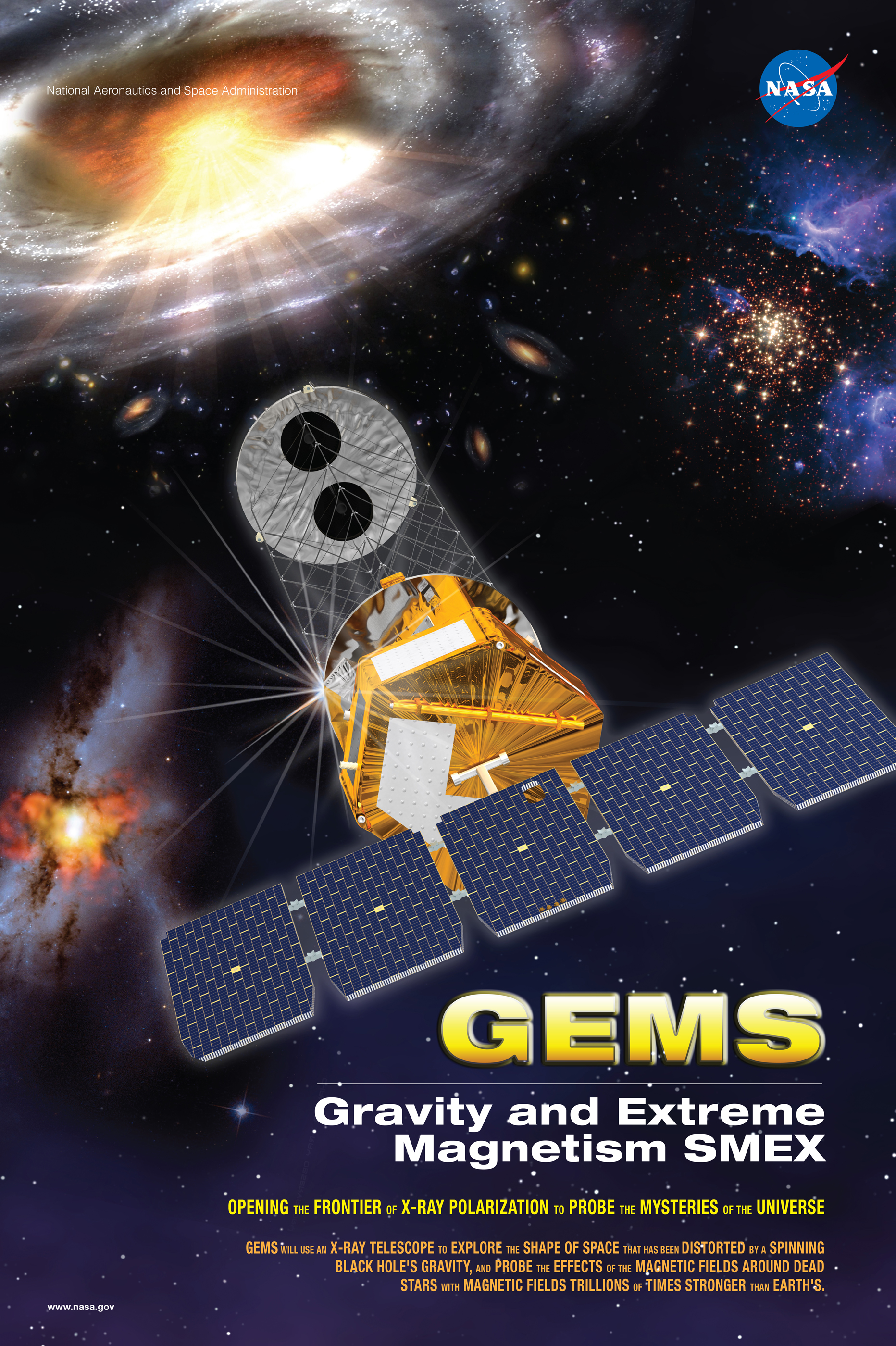
Mission poster for the GEMS telescope

The GEMS X-ray telescope was designed to indirectly measure the regions of distorted space around spinning black holes through a measurement of the polarization of X-rays emitted. It would have also probed the structure and effects of the magnetic fields around magnetars and other star remnants with magnetic fields trillions of times stronger than Earth's.

GEMS could reveal:

- How spinning black holes affect space-time and matter as it is drawn in and compressed by strong gravitational fields
- What happens in the very strong magnetic fields near pulsars and magnetars
- How cosmic rays are accelerated by shocks in supernova remnants

Current missions cannot do this because the required angular resolution is limited and magnetic fields are invisible.

The detector in GEMS would have been a small chamber filled with gas. When an X-ray is absorbed in the gas, an electron carries off most of the energy, and starts out in a direction related to the polarization direction of the X-ray. This electron loses energy by ionizing the gas; the instrument measures the direction of the ionization track, and thereby the polarization of the X-ray. The GEMS detector readout was to employ a time projection chamber to image the track. The GEMS instrument was planned to be about 100 times more sensitive than previous X-ray polarization experiments.

== Cancellation ==
Mission costs were capped at US$105 million (in Fiscal Year 2008 dollars), excluding the launch vehicle, but an independent confirmation review board at NASA claimed it would grow to an estimated US$150 million, leading to cancellation of the mission. The cancellation of GEMS marked the end of a multi-year-long binge of cancellations and attempted cancellations of current and future missions: it was at the time the last funded future U.S. space telescope besides James Webb Space Telescope (JWST). The cancellation of GEMS may have jeopardized the Pegasus XL launcher. (The Pegasus XL has successfully launched other small explorer missions)

== Project status ==
GEMS was one of six Small Explorer missions selected in May 2008 for the NASA Small Explorer (SMEX) Program Phase A study. In June 2009, GEMS was chosen to be the second of these missions to go forward into Phase B, starting in October 2010 for a launch in April 2014.

The project completed and successfully passed the Systems Requirements Review (SRR) in December 2010.

GEMS did not pass a confirmation review conducted on 10 May 2012, which effectively cancelled the project. The project team intended to appeal the cancellation.

On 7 June 2012, NASA officially announced the cancellation of the GEMS project. The mission was supposed to launch in July 2014 to study black holes and neutron stars, but external reviews found the project would likely exceed its budget. GEMS was supposed to hold at US$119 million, not counting the launch vehicle. NASA's astrophysics director, Paul Hertz, says the technology needed for the instrument took longer to develop than expected, and that drove up the price.

NASA continued studying X-ray polarimetry missions in 2015 for future Explorer program observatories.

== Project and Science Team ==
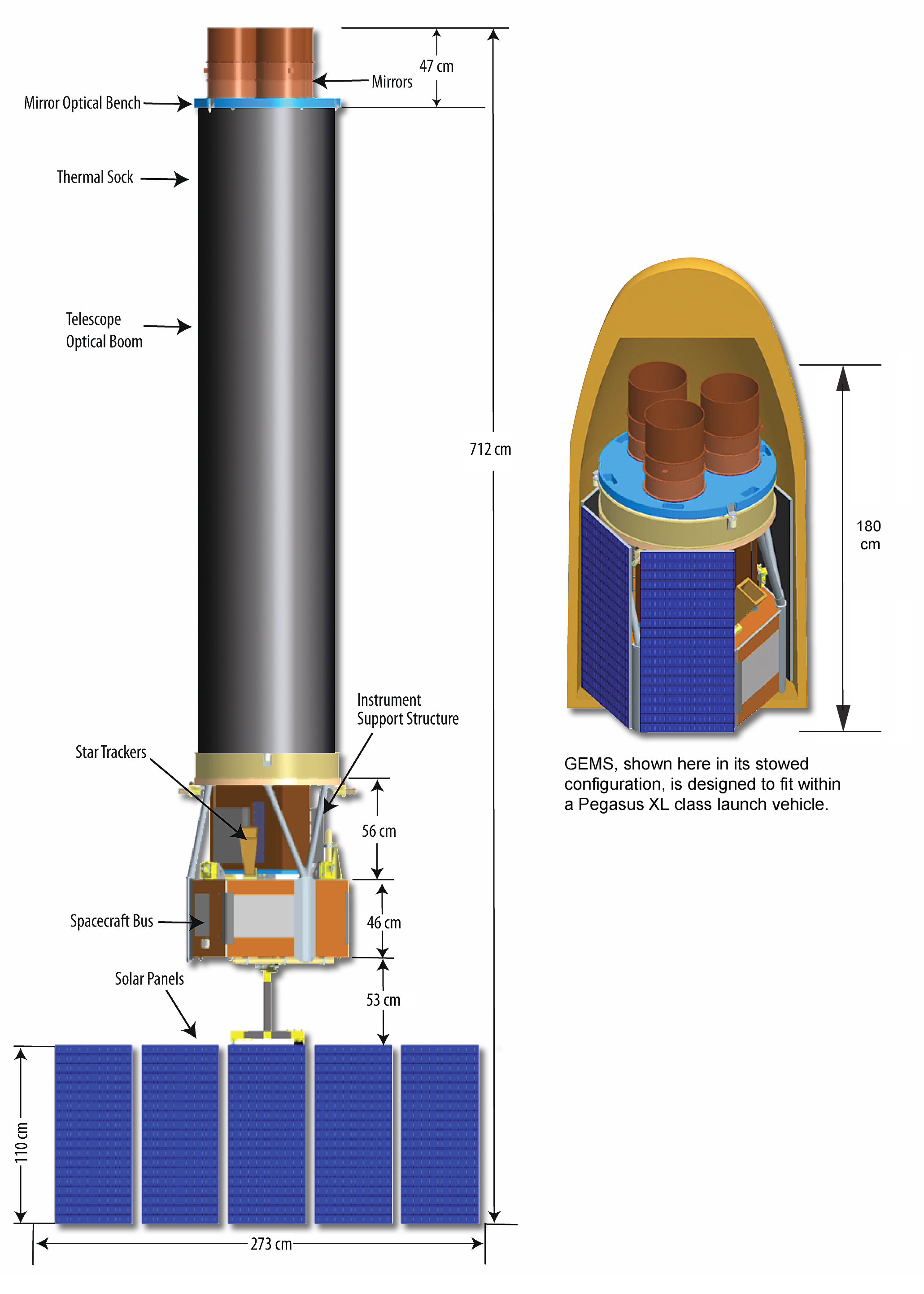
GEMS scheme

The GEMS principal investigator was Dr Jean H. Swank, of NASA's Goddard Space Flight Center, Greenbelt, Maryland.

=== Project Team ===
- GSFC was responsible for the GEMS instrument, system engineering, spacecraft contract, and the overall program management.
- Ames Research Center would have provided co-investigators and performed the Education and Public Outreach (EPO) support.
- The satellite would have been built by Orbital Sciences Corporation using its LEOStar-2 satellite bus design, and would also conduct mission operations, under a US$40 million contract.
- Alliant Techsystems (ATK) would build a deployable boom to place the X-ray mirrors at the proper distance from the detectors or polarimeters.
- University of Iowa would have provided instrument calibration assistance and would have had students prepare a small instrument that could be part of the mission.

=== Science Team ===
==== Co-investigators ====
- NASA Goddard Space Flight Center
- NASA Ames Research Center
- University of Iowa
- Massachusetts Institute of Technology (MIT)

==== Science collaborators ====
Other GEMS collaborators are from universities include:

- Johns Hopkins University
- Cornell University
- Rice University
- University of Oulu (Finland)
- North Carolina State University
- Washington University in St. Louis

== See also ==
- Explorer program
