= PoGOLite =

Gamma-ray observation instrument

- Website: gluon.particle.kth.se/pogolite/

PoGOLite (The Popolarised Gamma-ray Observer) is a balloon-borne astroparticle physics experiment which is to measure polarisation in hard X-rays and soft gamma-rays. It is sensitive to photons with an energy range of 25-80 keV. PoGOLite contains 217 phoswich detector cells (PDC) which are surrounded by a ring of side anticoincidence shield (SAS) detectors.

== PoGOLite Pathfinder mission ==
The pathfinder instrument containing 61 PDCs and 30 SAS detectors was scheduled to be launched from the Esrange facility in northern Sweden during summer 2011. The flight was to be the first westward circumpolar balloon flight in the northern hemisphere in 20 years and was expected to take 17–25 days.

The main targets of the pathfinder experiment are the Crab Pulsar and the high-mass X-ray binary system Cygnus X-1, which are two of the brightest objects in the energy range of PoGOLite.

The mission was launched at 1:57 am Thursday 7 July 2011 (23h57 GMT Wednesday 6 July 2011) from Esrange, Sweden. However, it was brought back down by 7:00 am from an altitude of 35 km, because of a helium leak. The payload landed near Nikkaluokta just before the mountains around the Sweden-Norway border where a landing would have caused more potential damage. The payload was returned to the Esrange site on 8 July 2011 after which initial tests showed only minor damage to the payload. A second attempt was scheduled for July 2012 but was cancelled because of bad weather. The mission's third and final attempt is scheduled for July 2013.

== See also ==
- Balloons for X-ray astronomy
- Astroparticle physics
