= Jean Swank =

American astronomer

Jean Hebb Swank
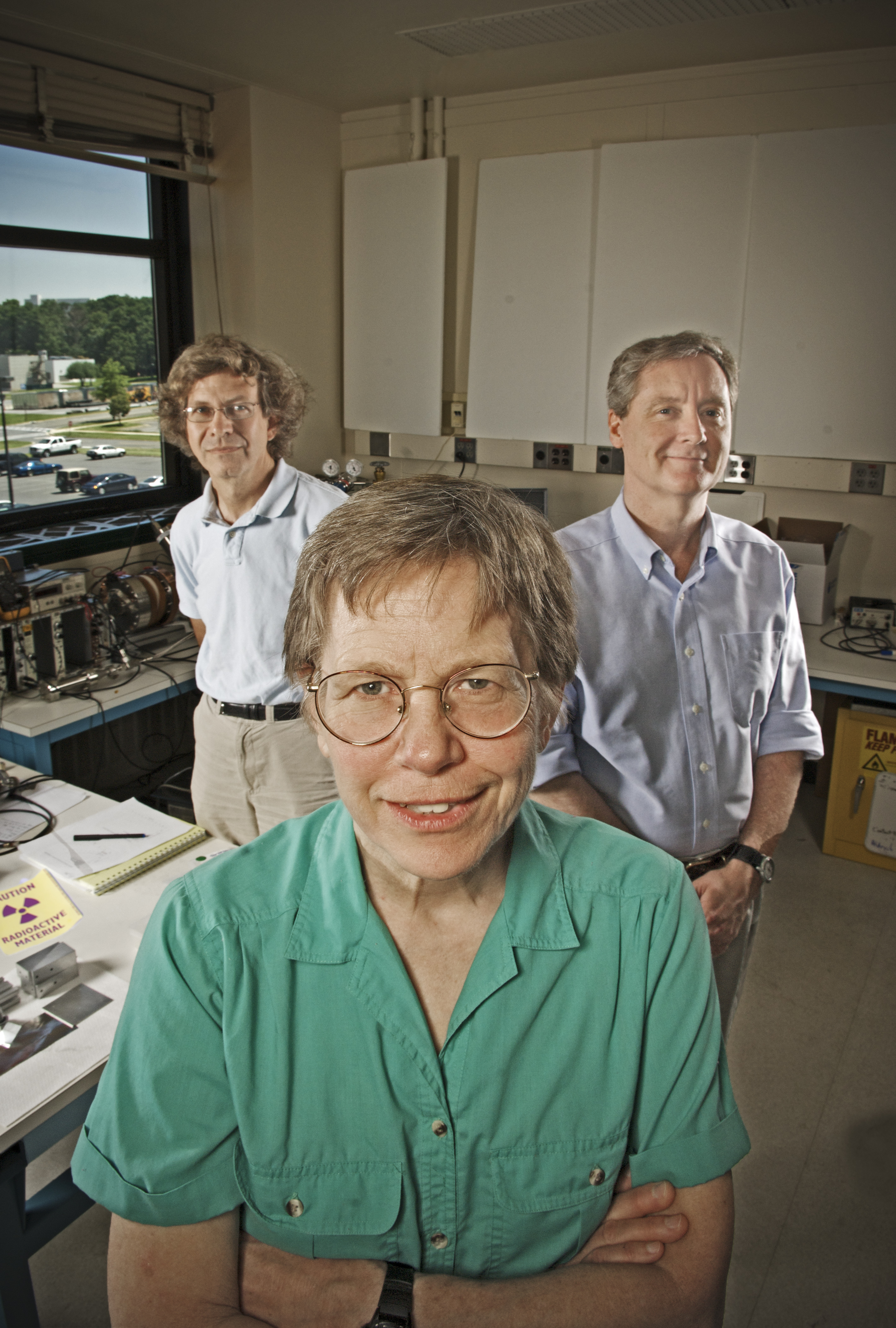
- Born: Mathilde Jeanette Hebb
- Education: BA (1961); PhD (1967)
- Alma mater: Bryn Mawr College; California Institute of Technology
- Occupation: astrophysicist
- Years active: 1975–2013
- Employer: NASA
- Known for: Research in X-ray astrophysics

Jean Hebb Swank is an American astrophysicist best known for her studies of black holes and neutron stars.

== Early life and education ==
Swank graduated with a Bachelor of Arts degree in physics from Bryn Mawr College in 1961. Two of her physics professors at Bryn Mawr were alumni of Caltech. They influenced her decision to attend graduate school at the California Institute of Technology. Under the supervision of Steve Frautschi, she was awarded her PhD in physics in 1967. Her thesis was "Radiative Corrections to Neutrino-Electron Interactions".

== Teaching career ==
Swank taught physics as an assistant professor at California State University at Los Angeles from 1966 to 1969. After her marriage, Swank moved to Illinois where she taught at Chicago State University from 1969 until 1971.

In 1971, Swank and her husband moved to Ankara, Turkey, to join the faculty of the Middle East Technical University as assistant professors. There she met Hakkı Boran Ögelman, a high-energy astrophysics researcher and head of the physics department at that time who had been involved in the gamma-ray astronomy group at the Goddard Space Flight Center. Through him, Swank learned of experiments under development for the eighth Orbiting Solar Observatory (OSO-8) to be launched in 1975. After she returned to the United States, Swank applied for and received a postdoctoral fellowship at Goddard.

== NASA career ==
Swank was first associated with NASA as a Resident Research Associate for the National Academy of Sciences National Research Council (NAS/NRC) in the X-ray Astrophysics Branch located in the Goddard Space Flight Center.

Swank was the principal investigator for the Proportional Counter Array (PCA) and project scientist for the Rossi X-ray Timing Explorer project launched in December 1995. In 1999, Swank was awarded the Bruno Rossi Prize along with Hale Bradt "for their key roles in the development of the Rossi X-Ray Timing Explorer, and for the resulting important discoveries related to high time resolution observations of compact astrophysical objects".

Swank was appointed principal investigator for NASA's Gravity and Extreme Magnetism Explorer (GEMS) project. The GEMS mission was canceled in 2012 due to projected costs 20% to 30% over budget.

Throughout her career at the Goddard Space Flight Center, Swank focused her research on observing and analyzing X-ray emissions from black holes and neutron stars. She was elected a fellow in the American Physical Society in 1993. She wrote or co-authored over 300 scientific papers published in scientific journals or by NASA during her career. In June 2013, Swank was awarded the NASA Distinguished Service Medal.

Swank retired in 2013. The Goddard Space Flight Center lists her as an emeritus scientist in her biographical sketch.

She was elected a Legacy Fellow of the American Astronomical Society in 2020.

== Personal life ==
While participating in a summer research program at the University of Maryland, she met Lowell James Swank, another physicist. They married in 1969 after he took a position at the National Accelerator Laboratory in Illinois.

== See also ==
- List of women in leadership positions on astronomical instrumentation projects
