= Martin C. Weisskopf =

American space scientist (1942–2026)

Martin Charles Weisskopf
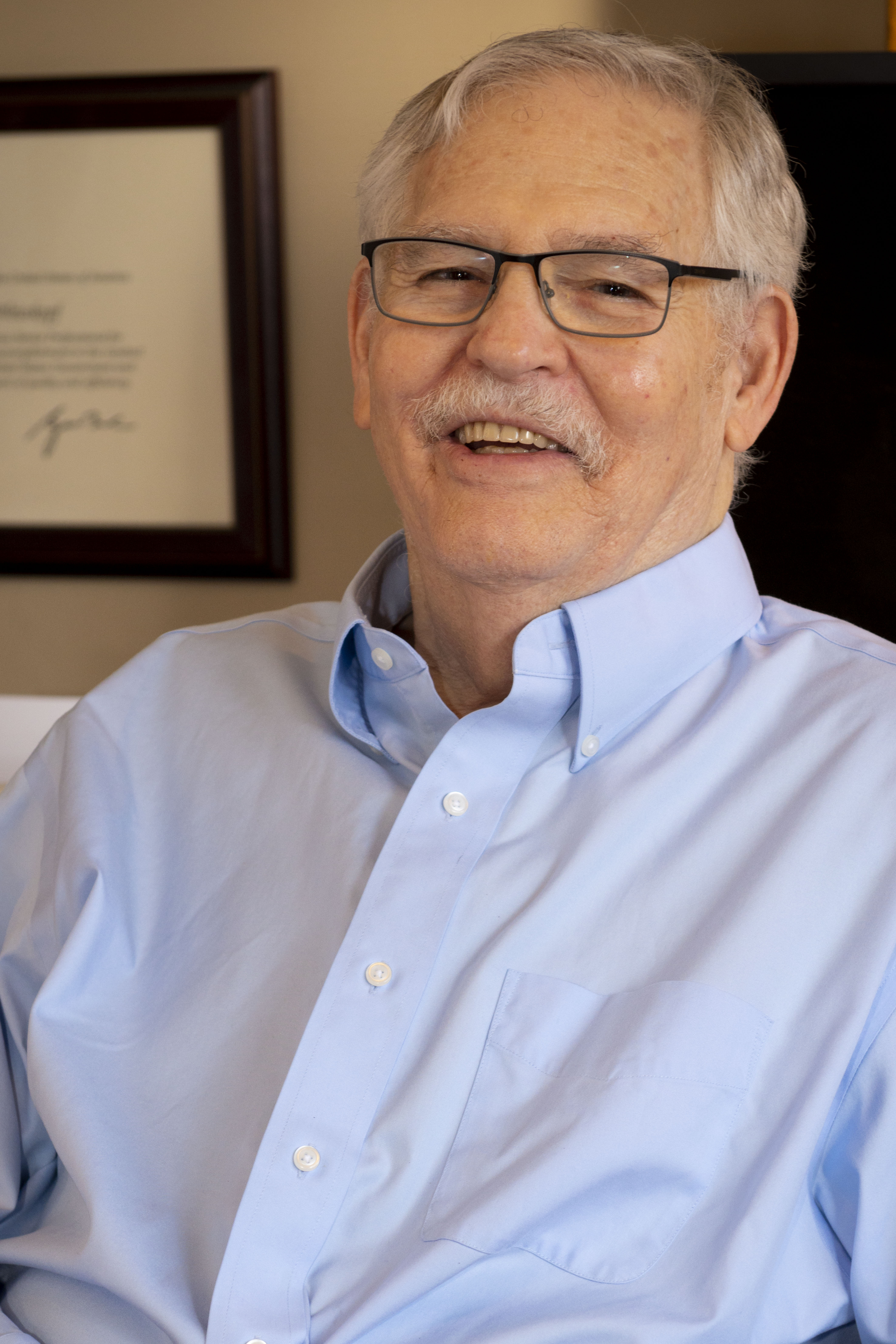
- Born: April 21, 1942; Omaha, Nebraska, U.S.
- Died: May 2, 2026 (aged 84)
- Education: Oberlin College, Brandeis University
- Occupation: Astrophysicist

Martin Charles Weisskopf (April 21, 1942 – May 2, 2026) was an American space scientist. Until his retirement from NASA at the end of May 2022, he was a project scientist for their Chandra X-ray Observatory, and Chief Scientist for X-ray Astronomy in the Space Sciences Department at NASA's Marshall Space Flight Center in Huntsville, Alabama. He was also the Principal Investigator of the Small Explorer mission the Imaging X-ray Polarimetry Explorer (IXPE).

== Life and career ==
Martin Charles Weisskopf was born in Omaha, Nebraska, on April 21, 1942. In 1964, he received his bachelor's degree (magna cum laude, with honors in Physics) from Oberlin College in Oberlin, Ohio. He then received a Woodrow Wilson Fellowship at Brandeis University in Waltham, Massachusetts, where he earned his Ph.D. in physics in 1969. He spent 1969 January through 1977 September at Columbia University, progressing from Research Associate to Assistant Professor. While at Columbia, he performed numerous pioneering experiments including the conception, design, construction, calibration, and flight of the sounding rocket experiment that first detected X-ray polarization from the Crab Nebula. While there he also pioneered in the development of high-resolution x-ray optics, including an arc-minute-resolution lightweight optic of the Kirkpatrick-Baez design. He was a Co-Investigator and the Project Scientist (1975-1977) of the X-ray polarimeter experiment on the OSO-8 satellite, and an original Co-Investigator of what would become the Einstein Observatory. As such he became responsible for the time variability studies of the Monitor proportional Counter.

In 1977 Weisskopf left Columbia to become Senior X-Ray Astronomer at MSFC and AXAF (now Chandra) Project Scientist. Subsequently, he became Chief of the X-Ray Astronomy Branch (1985-1993), a group he created. Before his retirement in May 2022, he was Chief Scientist for X-Ray Astronomy at MSFC. He retired from NASA in May 2022 and was a NASA Emeritus.

Weisskopf held numerous special appointments during his career. He was a senior co-investigator of the European Space Agency's international X-ray imaging experiment, called IBIS, and the originator of a major experimental research program that began in 1978 that currently continues to concentrate on the development of X-ray optics. This program includes among its successes the first successful focusing hard x-ray optics which took the first images of astronomical objects in a balloon flight in 2001. It is also noteworthy that Dr. Weisskopf obtained the funds that gave John Carlstrom and Marshall Joy their start for using interferometry to measure the Sunyaev-Zel’dovich effect, which not only supported X-ray observations of clusters of galaxies but has become a major scientific "industry" unto itself. Until his retirement from NASA, Weisskopf was also the instigator and Principal Investigator of one of NASA’s Small Explorer missions, the Imaging X-ray Polarimetry Explorer (IXPE), launched in December 2021.

He served on numerous committees, including the National Academy of Science's Panel on High-Energy Astrophysics from Space, Astronomy, and Astrophysics Survey Committee. He was a member of the American Astronomical Society and its High-Energy Astrophysics Division; the American Association for the Advancement of Science; the International Astronomical Union; Sigma Xi, a scientific research society; Phi Beta Kappa, the National Honor Society, and a Fellow of the American Physical Society, Astrophysics Division.

Weisskopf was the recipient of numerous awards, including NASA Medals for Exceptional Service in 1992 and for Scientific Achievement in 1999. He was elected in 1994 as a Fellow of the American Physical Society, which cited his "pioneering work in X-ray polarimetry and time variability studies of cosmic X-ray sources, and his insightful leadership as Project Scientist for the Advanced X-ray Astrophysics Facility." In 2001, he was selected as a fellow in the International Society for Optical Engineering (SPIE) for his significant scientific and technical contributions to the optics community and SPIE. In 2004, together with Dr. H. Tananbaum, he received the Rossi Prize of the High Energy Astrophysics Division of the American Astronomical Society which cited "their vision, dedication, and leadership in the development, testing, and operation of the Chandra X-ray Observatory" In 2006 he was awarded an honorary Dr. of Science degree by Oberlin College, Oberlin Ohio. In 2021 he was named a Legacy Fellow of the American astronomical Society. In 2024 he won another Bruno Rossi Prize, together with Paolo Soffitta and the IXPE team, "for their development of the Imaging X-ray Polarimetry Explorer whose novel measurements advance our understanding of particle acceleration and emission from astrophysical shocks, black holes and neutron stars.". On 13 June 2025, the International Antonio Feltrinelli Award for Physical, Mathematical and Natural Sciences - Astronomy was presented by the President of Italy to Martin Weisskopf, Enrico Costa, and Ronaldo Bellazzini. The citation recognizes the success of the Imaging X-ray Polarimetry Explorer (IXPE).

He was author or co-author of more than 360 publications which include refereed journal articles, articles in books, monographs, and papers in conference proceedings.

Weisskopf died on May 2, 2026, at the age of 84.
