= Rossi X-ray Timing Explorer =

NASA satellite of the Explorer program

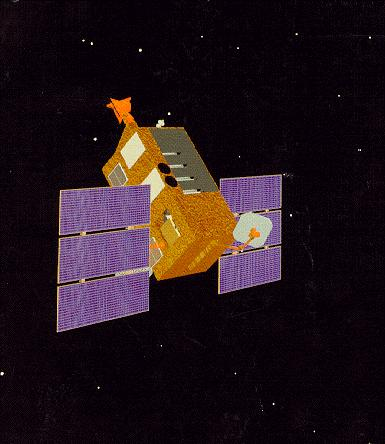
- Rossi X-ray Timing Explorer satellite
- Names: Explorer 69; RXTE; XTE
- Mission type: Astronomy
- Operator: NASA
- COSPAR ID: 1995-074A
- SATCAT no.: 23757
- Website: RXTE home page
- Mission duration: 16 years (achieved)

Spacecraft properties
- Spacecraft: Explorer LXVIX
- Spacecraft type: Rossi X-ray Timing Explorer
- Bus: X-ray Timing Explorer
- Manufacturer: Goddard Space Flight Center
- Launch mass: 3,200 kg (7,100 lb)
- Power: 800 watts

Start of mission
- Launch date: 30 December 1995, 13:48:00 UTC
- Rocket: Delta II 7920-10 (Delta 230)
- Launch site: Cape Canaveral, SLC-17A
- Contractor: McDonnell Douglas Astronautics Company
- Entered service: 30 December 1995

End of mission
- Deactivated: 12 January 2012
- Decay date: 30 April 2018

Orbital parameters
- Reference system: Geocentric orbit
- Regime: Low Earth orbit
- Perigee altitude: 409 km (254 mi)
- Apogee altitude: 409 km (254 mi)
- Inclination: 28.50°
- Period: 92.60 minutes

Instruments
| ASM | All Sky Monitor (ASM) |
| HEXTE | High-Energy X-ray Timing Experiment (HEXTE) |
| PCA | Proportional Counter Array (PCA) |

The Rossi X-ray Timing Explorer (RXTE) was a NASA satellite that observed the time variation of astronomical X-ray sources, named after physicist Bruno Rossi. The RXTE had three instruments — an All-Sky Monitor, the High-Energy X-ray Timing Experiment (HEXTE) and the Proportional Counter Array. The RXTE observed X-rays from black holes, neutron stars, X-ray pulsars and X-ray bursts. It was funded as part of the Explorer program and was also called Explorer 69.

RXTE had a mass of 3,200 kg (7,100 lb) and was launched from Cape Canaveral on 30 December 1995, at 13:48:00 UTC, on a Delta II launch vehicle. Its International Designator is 1995-074A.

== Mission ==
The X-Ray Timing Explorer (XTE) mission has the primary objective to study the temporal and broad-band spectral phenomena associated with stellar and galactic systems containing compact objects in the energy range 2--200 KeV and in time scales from microseconds to years. Its instrumentation consists of two pointed instruments, the Proportional Counter Array (PCA) and the High-Energy X-ray Timing Experiment (HEXTE), and the All Sky Monitor (ASM), which scans over 70% of the sky each orbit. All of the XTE observing time were available to the international scientific community through a peer review of submitted proposals. XTE used a new spacecraft design that allows flexible operations through rapid pointing, high data rates, and nearly continuous receipt of data at the Science Operations Center (SOC) at Goddard Space Flight Center via a Multiple Access link to the Tracking and Data Relay Satellite System (TDRSS). XTE was highly maneuverable with a slew rate of greater than 6° per minute. The PCA/HEXTE could be pointed anywhere in the sky to an accuracy of less than 0.1°, with an aspect knowledge of around 1 arcminute. Rotatable solar panels enable anti-sunward pointing to coordinate with ground-based night-time observations. Two pointable high-gain antennas maintain nearly continuous communication with the TDRSS. This, together with 1 GB (approximately four orbits) of on-board solid-state data storage, give added flexibility in scheduling observations.

== Telecommunications ==
- Required continuous TDRSS Multiple Access (MA) return link coverage except for zone of exclusion: Real-time and playback of engineering/housekeeping data at 16 or 32 kbs - Playback of science data at 48 or 64 kbs.
- Requires 20 minutes of SSA contacts with alternating TDRSS per orbit: Real-time and playback of engineering/housekeeping data at 32 kbs - Playback of science data at 512 or 1024 kbs.
- For launch and contingency, required TDRSS MA/SSA real-time engineering and housekeeping at 1 kbs.
- The bit error rate shall be less than 1 in 10E8 for at least 95% of the orbits.

== Instruments ==
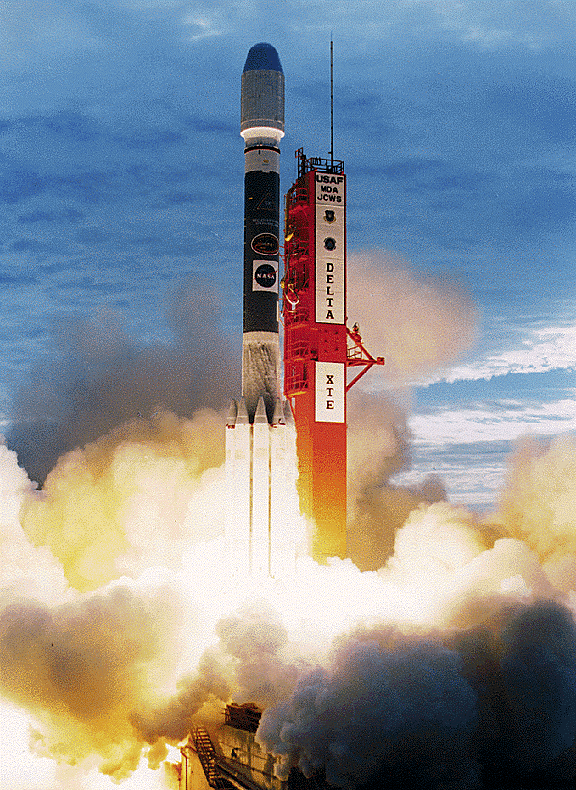
XTE launch

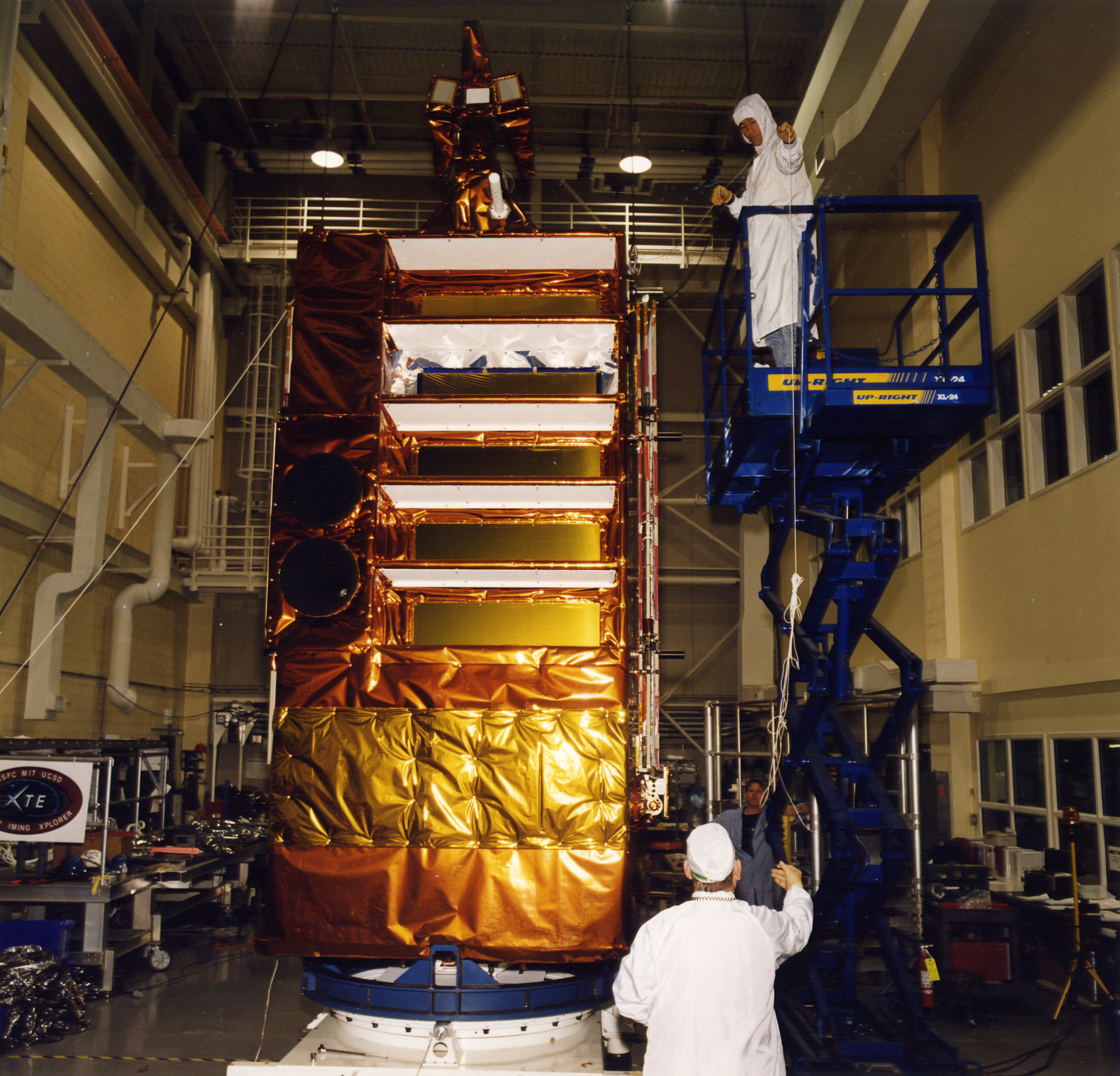
RXTE preparations in 1995

=== All-Sky Monitor (ASM) ===
The All-Sky Monitor (ASM) provided all-sky X-ray coverage, to a sensitivity of a few percent of the Crab Nebula intensity in one day, in order to provide both flare alarms and long-term intensity records of celestial X-ray sources. The ASM consisted of three wide-angle shadow cameras equipped with proportional counters with a total collecting area of 90 cm^{2} (14 sq in). The instrumental properties were:

- Energy range: 2–12-keV;
- Time resolution: observes 80% of the sky every 90 minutes;
- Spatial resolution: 3' × 15';
- Number of shadow cameras: 3, each with 6° × 90° FoV;
- Collecting area: 90 cm^{2} (14 sq in);
- Detector: Xenon proportional counter, position-sensitive;
- Sensitivity: 30 mCrab.

It was built by the CSR at Massachusetts Institute of Technology. The principal investigator was Dr. Hale Bradt.

=== High Energy X-ray Timing Experiment (HEXTE) ===
The High-Energy X-ray Timing Experiment (HEXTE) is a scintillator array for the study of temporal and temporal/spectral effects of the hard X-ray (20 to 200 keV) emission from galactic and extragalactic sources. The HEXTE consisted of two clusters each containing four phoswich scintillation detectors. Each cluster could "rock" (beam switch) along mutually orthogonal directions to provide background measurements 1.5° or 3.0° away from the source every 16 to 128 seconds. In addition, the input was sampled at 8 microseconds so as to detect time-varying phenomena. Automatic gain control was provided by using an ^{241}Am radioactive source mounted in each detector's field of view. The HEXTE's basic properties were:

- Energy range: 15–250 keV;
- Energy resolution: 15% at 60 keV;
- Time sampling: 8 microseconds;
- Field of view: 1° FWHM;
- Detectors: 2 clusters of 4 NaI/CsI scintillation counters;
- Collecting area: 2 × 800 cm^{2} (120 sq in);
- Sensitivity: 1-Crab = 360 count/second per HEXTE cluster;
- Background: 50 count/second per HEXTE cluster.

The HEXTE was designed and built by the Center for Astrophysics & Space Sciences (CASS) at the University of California, San Diego. The HEXTE principal investigator was Dr. Richard E. Rothschild.

=== Proportional Counter Array (PCA) ===
The Proportional Counter Array (PCA) provides approximately 6,500 cm^{2} (1,010 sq in) of X-ray detector area, in the energy range 2 to 60 keV, for the study of temporal/spectral effects in the X-ray emission from galactic and extragalactic sources. The PCA was an array of five proportional counters with a total collecting area of 6,500 cm^{2} (1,010 sq in). The instrumental properties were:

- Energy range: 2–60 keV;
- Energy resolution: <18% at 6 keV;
- Time resolution: 1 μs
- Spatial resolution: collimator with 1° (FWHM);
- Detectors: 5 proportional counters;
- Collecting area: 6,500 cm^{2} (1,010 sq in);
- Layers: 1 propane veto; 3 Xenon, each split into two; 1 Xenon veto layer;
- Sensitivity: 0.1-mCrab;
- Background: 90-mCrab.

The PCA is being built by the Laboratory for High Energy Astrophysics (LHEA) at Goddard Space Flight Center. The principal investigator was Jean Swank.

== Results ==
Observations from the Rossi X-ray Timing Explorer have been used as evidence for the existence of the frame-dragging effect predicted by the theory of general relativity of Einstein. RXTE results have, as of late 2007, been used in more than 1400 scientific papers.

In January 2006, it was announced that Rossi had been used to locate a candidate intermediate-mass black hole named M82 X-1. In February 2006, data from RXTE was used to prove that the diffuse background X-ray glow in our galaxy comes from innumerable, previously undetected white dwarfs and from other stars' coronae. In April 2008, RXTE data was used to infer the size of the smallest known black hole.

RXTE ceased science operations on 12 January 2012.

== Atmospheric entry ==
NASA scientists said that the decommissioned RXTE would re-enter the Earth's atmosphere "between 2014 and 2023" (30 April 2018). Later, it became clear that the satellite would re-enter in late April or early May 2018, and the spacecraft fell out of orbit on 30 April 2018.

== See also ==
- List of X-ray space telescopes
- Neutron Star Interior Composition Explorer (NICER, launched in June 2017 and attached to ISS)
