= IXPE =

NASA satellite of the Explorer program

Imaging X-ray Polarimetry Explorer
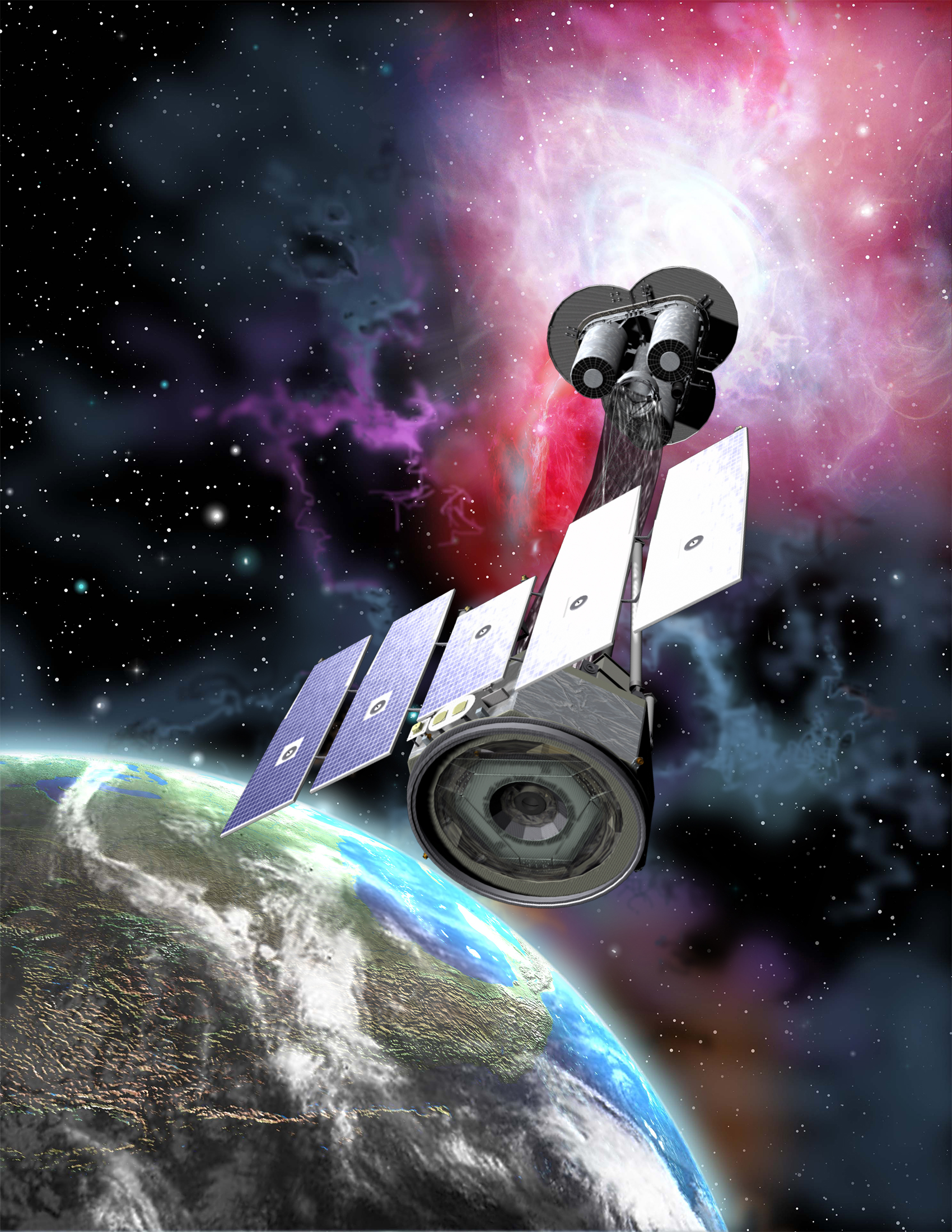
- IXPE satellite, on the top are its three identical X-ray optics elements, the sensors are on the bottom.
- Names: Explorer 97; IXPE; SMEX-14
- Mission type: X-ray polarimetry
- Operator: NASA, ASI
- COSPAR ID: 2021-121A
- SATCAT no.: 49954
- Website: ixpe.msfc.nasa.gov asi.it/ixpe
- Mission duration: 5 years (planned); 4 years, 11 months and 10 days (in progress)

Spacecraft properties
- Spacecraft: Explorer XCVII
- Spacecraft type: Imaging X-ray Polarimetry Explorer
- Bus: BCP-100
- Manufacturer: Ball Aerospace & Technologies; OHB Italia
- Launch mass: 330 kg (730 lb)
- Payload mass: 170 kg (370 lb)
- Dimensions: 1.1 m (3 ft 7 in) in diameter and 5.2 m (17 ft) tall, fully extended Solar array: 2.7 m (8 ft 10 in) fully deployed

Start of mission
- Launch date: 9 December 2021, 06:00 UTC
- Rocket: Falcon 9 B1061-5
- Launch site: Kennedy Space Center, LC-39A
- Contractor: SpaceX
- Entered service: 10 January 2022

Orbital parameters
- Reference system: Geocentric orbit
- Regime: Low Earth orbit
- Perigee altitude: 540 km (340 mi)
- Apogee altitude: 540 km (340 mi)
- Inclination: 0.20°
- Period: 90.00 minutes

Main telescope
- Type: Three-mirror
- Focal length: 4 m
- Wavelengths: X-ray

Transponders
- Band: S-band
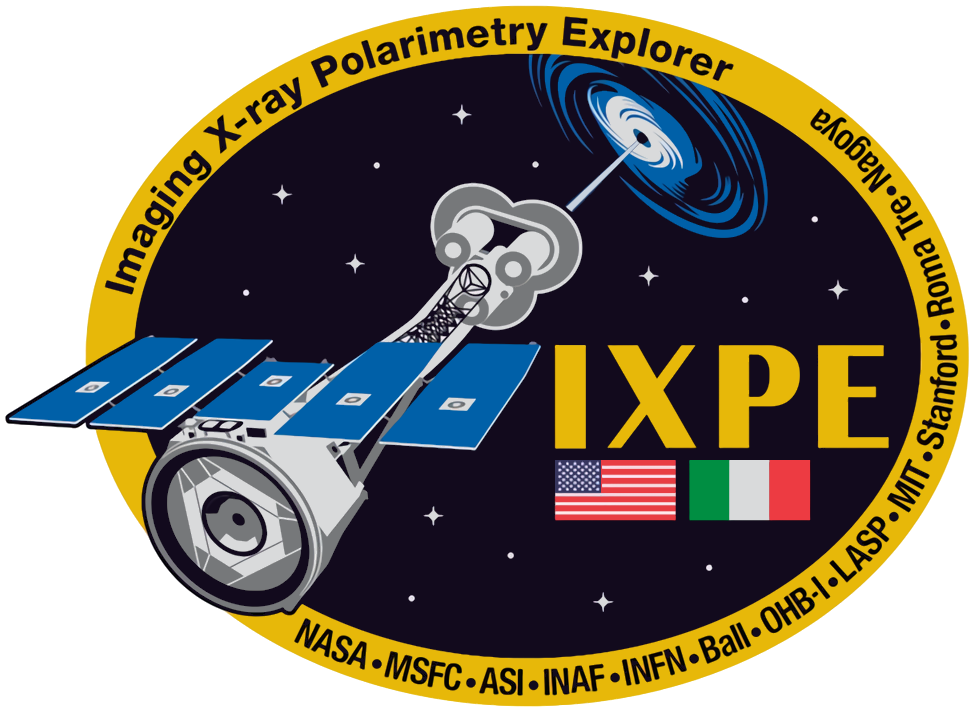
- IXPE mission logo Explorers Program

Imaging X-ray Polarimetry Explorer, commonly known as IXPE or SMEX-14, is a space observatory with three identical telescopes designed to measure the polarization of cosmic X-rays of black holes, neutron stars, and pulsars. The observatory, which was launched on 9 December 2021, is an international collaboration between NASA and the Italian Space Agency (ASI). It is part of NASA's Explorers program, which designs low-cost spacecraft to study heliophysics and astrophysics.

The mission will study exotic astronomical objects and permit mapping of the magnetic fields of black holes, neutron stars, pulsars, supernova remnants, magnetars, quasars, and active galactic nuclei. The high-energy X-ray radiation from these objects' surrounding environment can be polarized – oscillating in a particular direction. Studying the polarization of X-rays reveals the physics of these objects and can provide insights into the high-temperature environments where they are created.

== Overview ==
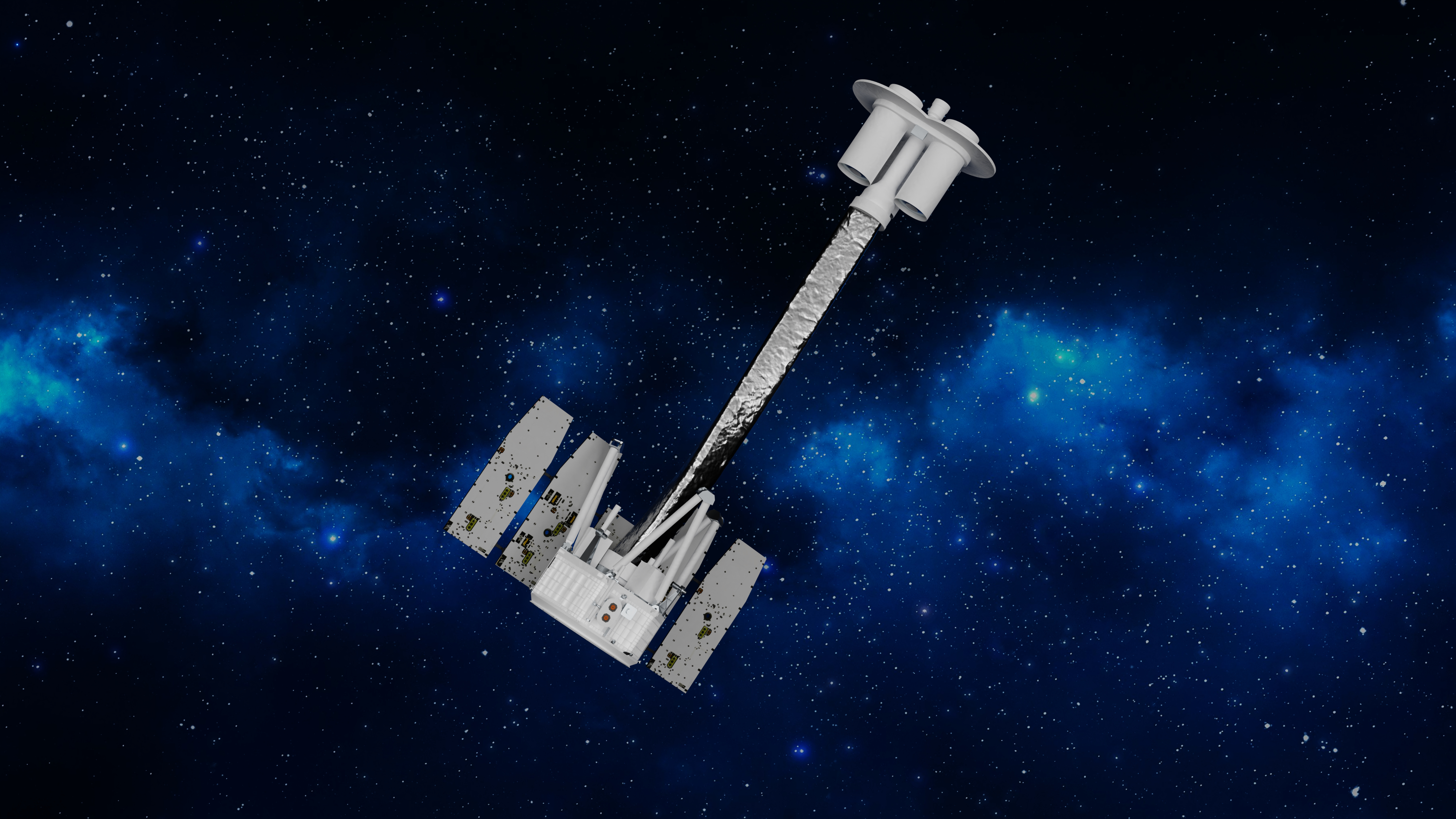
Illustration of IXPE

The IXPE mission was announced on 3 January 2017 and was launched on 9 December 2021. The international collaboration was signed in June 2017, when the Italian Space Agency (ASI) committed to provide the X-ray polarization detectors. The estimated cost of the mission and its two-year operation is US$188 million (the launch cost is US$50.3 million). The goal of the IXPE mission is to expand understanding of high-energy astrophysical processes and sources, in support of NASA's first science objective in astrophysics: "Discover how the universe works". By obtaining X-ray polarimetry and polarimetric imaging of cosmic sources, IXPE addresses two specific science objectives: to determine the radiation processes and detailed properties of specific cosmic X-ray sources or categories of sources; and to explore general relativistic and quantum effects in extreme environments.

During IXPE's two-year mission, it will study targets such as active galactic nuclei, quasars, pulsars, pulsar wind nebulae, magnetars, accreting X-ray binaries, supernova remnants, and the Galactic Center.

The spacecraft was built by Ball Aerospace & Technologies. The principal investigator is Martin C. Weisskopf of NASA Marshall Space Flight Center; he is the chief scientist for X-ray astronomy at NASA's Marshall Space Flight Center and project scientist for the Chandra X-ray Observatory spacecraft. NASA's Marshall Space Flight Center also designed, manufactured, and tested the X-ray mirrors for the telescope.

Other partners include the McGill University, Massachusetts Institute of Technology (MIT), Roma Tre University, Stanford University, OHB Italia and the University of Colorado Boulder.

== Objectives ==
The technical and science objectives include:

- Improve polarization sensitivity by two orders of magnitude over the X-ray polarimeter aboard the Orbiting Solar Observatory 8
- Provide simultaneous spectral, spatial, and temporal measurements
- Determine the geometry and the emission mechanism of active galactic nuclei and microquasars
- Find the magnetic field configuration in magnetars and determine the magnitude of the field
- Find the mechanism for X-ray production in pulsars (both isolated and accreting) and the geometry
- Determine how particles are accelerated in pulsar wind nebula

== Telescopes ==
The space observatory features three identical telescopes designed to measure the polarization of cosmic X-rays. The polarization-sensitive detector was invented and developed by Italian scientists of the Istituto Nazionale di AstroFisica (INAF) and the Istituto Nazionale di Fisica Nucleare (INFN) and was refined over several years.

Telescope (×3)	Basic parameters
Wavelength	X-ray
Energy range	2–8 keV
Field of view (FoV)	>11′
Angular resolution	≤30″

=== Principle ===
IXPE's payload is a set of three identical imaging X-ray polarimetry systems mounted on a common optical bench and co-aligned with the pointing axis of the spacecraft. Each system operates independently for redundancy and comprises a mirror module assembly that focuses X-rays onto a polarization-sensitive imaging detector developed in Italy. The 4 m (13 ft) focal length is achieved using a deployable boom.

The Gas Pixel Detectors (GPD), a type of Micropattern gaseous detector, rely on the anisotropy of the emission direction of photoelectrons produced by polarized photons to gauge with high sensitivity the polarization state of X-rays interacting in a gaseous medium. Position-dependent and energy-dependent polarization maps of such synchrotron-emitting sources will reveal the magnetic-field structure of the X-ray emitting regions. X-ray polarimetric imaging better indicates the magnetic structure in regions of strong electron acceleration. The system is capable to resolve point sources from surrounding nebular emission or from adjacent point sources.

== Launch profile ==
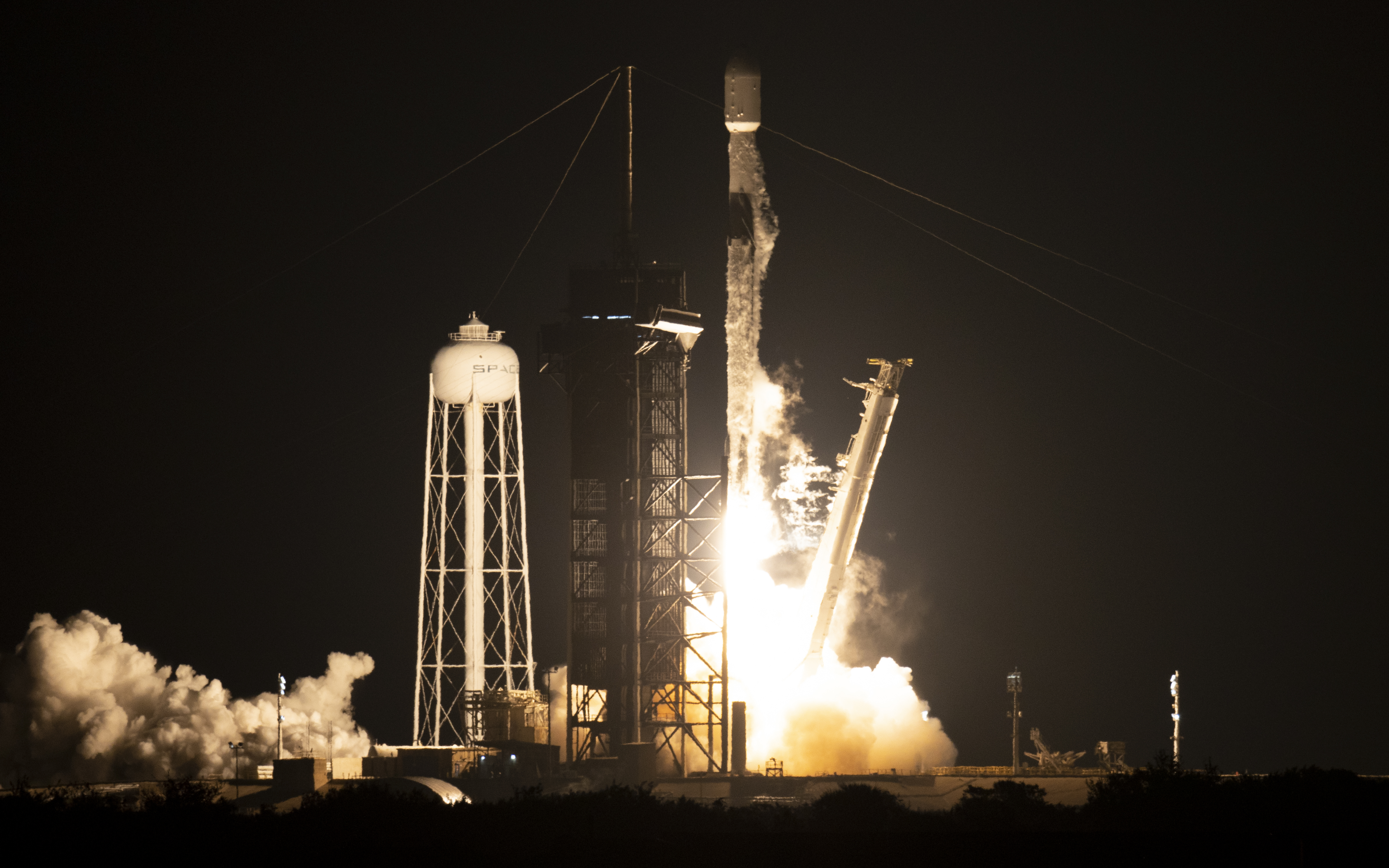
IXPE launch

IXPE was launched on 9 December 2021 on a SpaceX Falcon 9 (B1061.5) from LC-39A at NASA's Kennedy Space Center in Florida. The relatively small size and mass of the observatory falls well short of the normal capacity of SpaceX's Falcon 9 launch vehicle. However, Falcon 9 had to work to get IXPE into the correct orbit because IXPE is designed to operate in an almost exactly equatorial orbit with a 0° inclination. Launching from Cape Canaveral, which is located 28.5° above the equator, it was physically impossible to launch directly into a 0.2° equatorial orbit. Instead, the rocket needed to launch due east into a parking orbit and then perform a plane, or inclination, change once in space, as the spacecraft crossed the equator. For Falcon 9, this meant that even the tiny 330 kg (730 lb) IXPE likely still represented about 20–30% of its maximum theoretical performance (1,500–2,000 kg (3,300–4,400 lb)) for such a mission profile, while the same launch vehicle is otherwise able to launch about 15,000 kg (33,000 lb) to the same 540 km (340 mi) orbit IXPE was targeting when no plane change is needed, while recovering the first stage booster.

IXPE is the first satellite dedicated to measuring the polarization of X-rays from a variety of cosmic sources, such as black holes and neutron stars. The orbit hugging the equator will minimize the X-ray instrument's exposure to radiation in the South Atlantic Anomaly, the region where the inner Van Allen radiation belt comes closest to Earth's surface.

== Operations ==
IXPE is built to last for two years. After that it may be retired and deorbited or given an extended mission.

After launch and deployment of the IXPE spacecraft, NASA pointed the spacecraft at 1ES 1959+650, a black hole, and SMC X-1, a pulsar, for calibration. After that the spacecraft observed its first science target, Cassiopeia A. A first-light image of Cassiopeia A was released on 11 January 2022. 30 targets are planned to be observed during IXPE's first year.

IXPE communicates with Earth via a ground station in Malindi, Kenya. The ground station is owned and operated by the Italian Space Agency.

At present mission operations for IXPE are controlled by the Laboratory for Atmospheric and Space Physics (LASP).

== Results ==
In May 2022 the first study of IXPE hinted the possibility of vacuum birefringence on 4U 0142+61 and in August another study looked at Centaurus A measuring low polarization degree, suggesting that the X-ray emission is coming from a scattering process rather than arising directly from the accelerated particles of the jet. In October 2022 it observed the gamma ray burst GRB 221009A, also known as the "Brightest of all time" (BOAT).

== Gallery ==
IXPE spacecraft

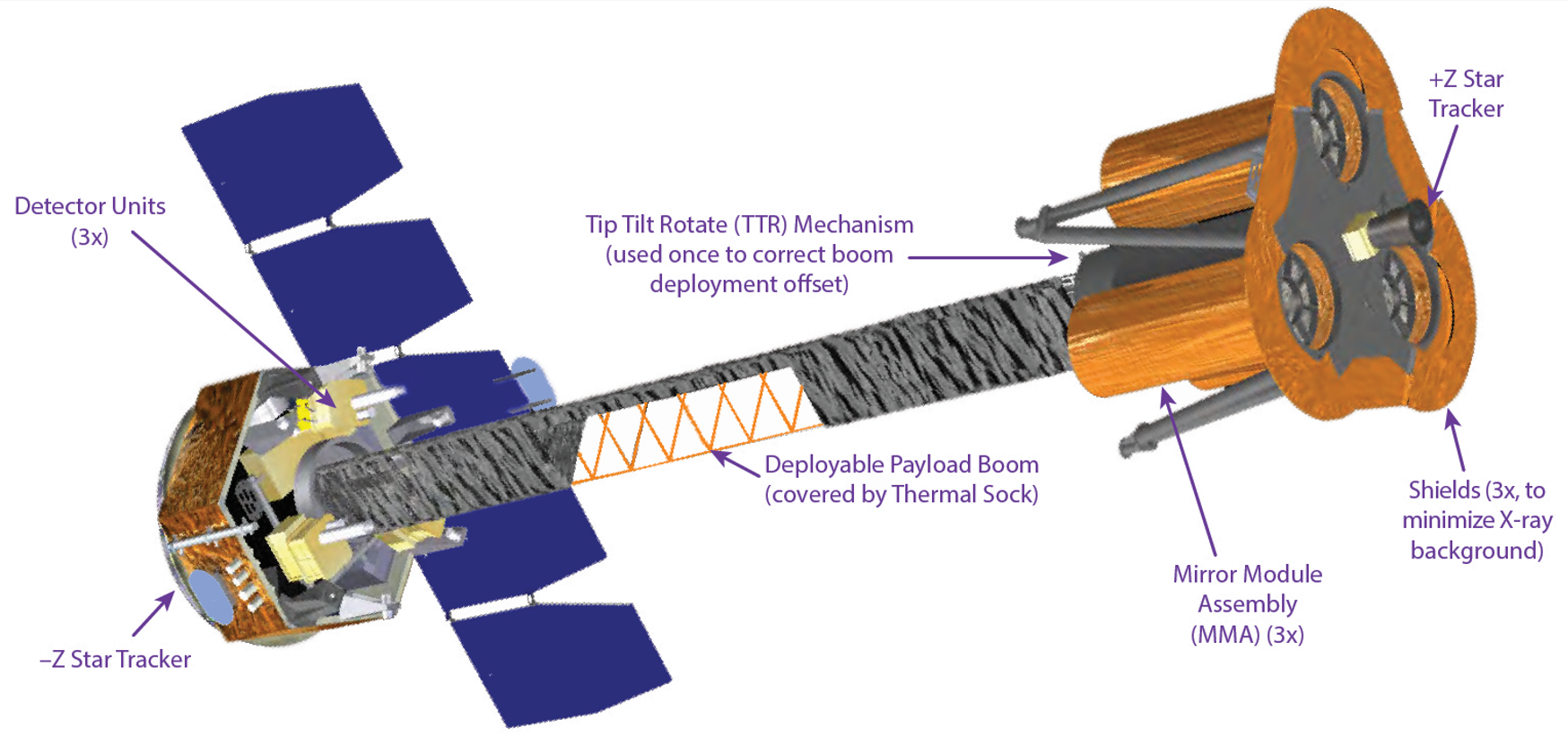
Diagram of IXPE's structure

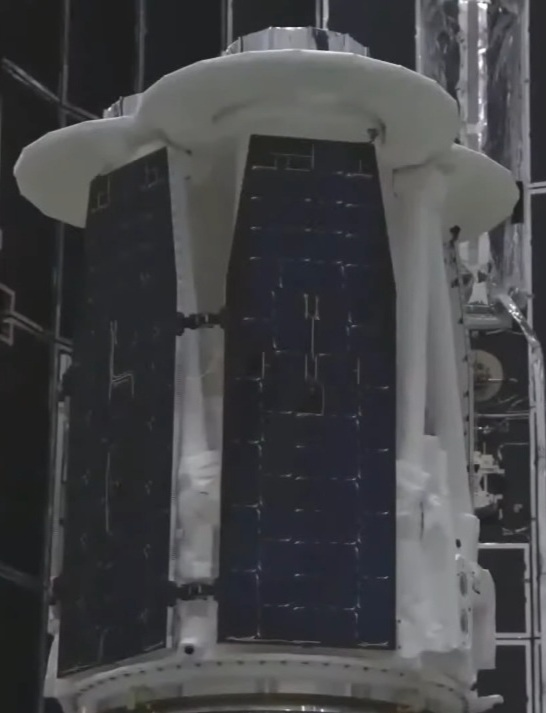
IXPE before launch

Animation of the IXPE deployment process
Observations by IXPE

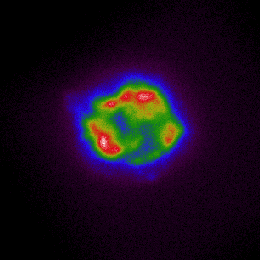
IXPE X-ray image of the supernova remnant Cassiopeia A

== See also ==
- Astrophysical X-ray source
- Explorer program
- GEMS, a similar spacecraft
- List of X-ray space telescopes
- X-ray astronomy
- X-ray telescope
- XPoSat - launched around the same time, complements IXPE by observing space events in 2-30 keV range
