= PSR J1748−2446ad =

Pulsar in the constellation Sagittarius

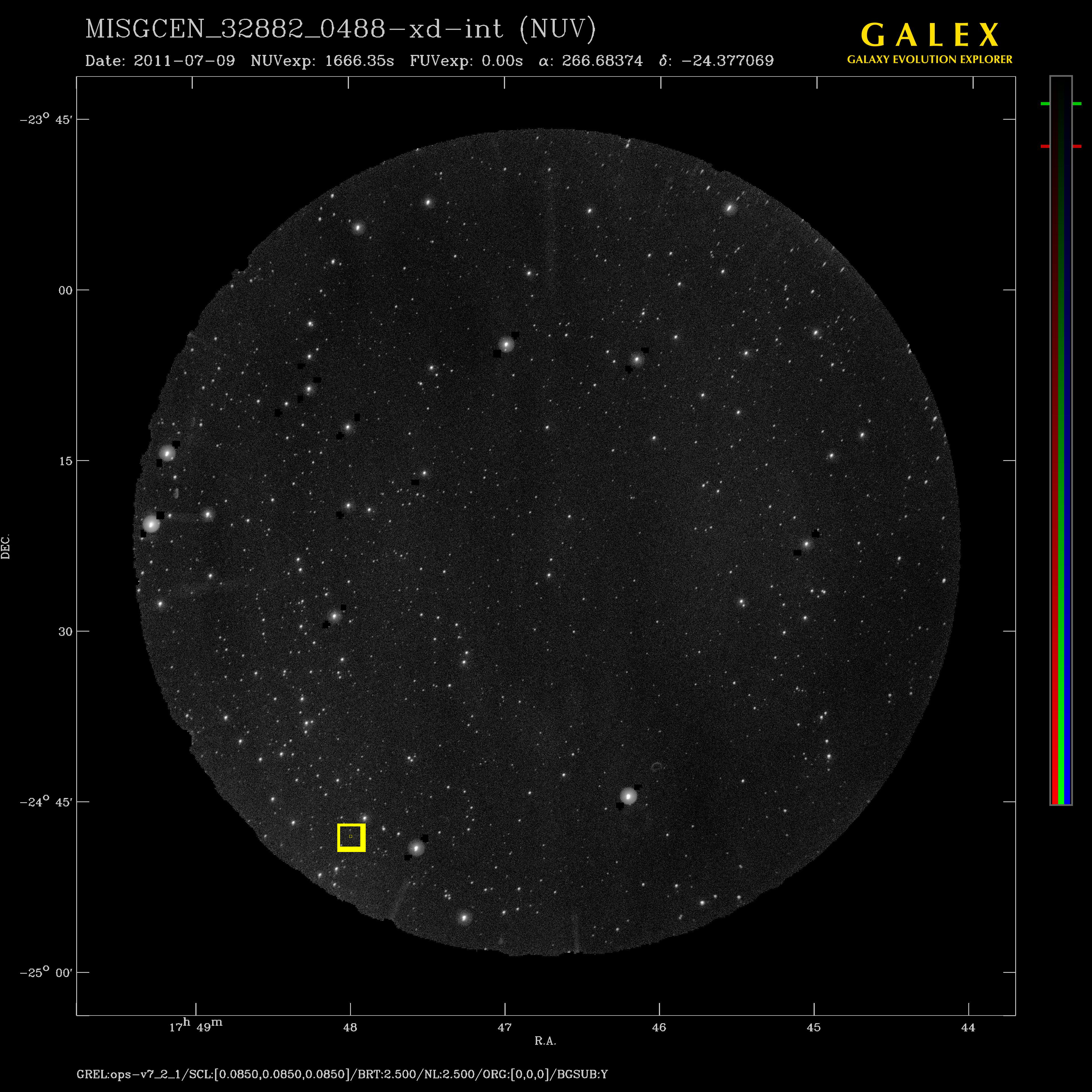
- The location of PSR J1748-2446ad in the night sky. The pulsar is located in the center of the yellow square. It is too faint in this image to be visible against the background. Credit: GALEX GR6/7 Data Release

Observation data Epoch J2000 Equinox ICRS
- Constellation: Sagittarius
- Right ascension: 17^{h} 48^{m} 04.9^{s}
- Declination: −24° 46′ 04″

Characteristics
- Spectral type: Pulsar

Astrometry
Distance	18,000 ly (5,500 pc)

Details
Mass	<2 M_{☉}
Radius	<16 km
Rotation	1.39595482(6) ms 716.35556(3) Hz
Age	≥2.5×10^{7} years

Database references
SIMBAD	data

PSR J1748−2446ad is the fastest-spinning pulsar known, at 716.35 Hz (times per second), or 42,981 revolutions per minute (1.3959 milliseconds). This pulsar was discovered by Jason W. T. Hessels of McGill University on November 10, 2004, and confirmed on January 8, 2005.

If the neutron star is assumed to contain less than two times the mass of the Sun, within the typical range of neutron stars, its radius is constrained to be less than 16 km. At its equator it is spinning at approximately 24% of the speed of light, or over 70,000 km per second.

The pulsar is located in a globular cluster of stars called Terzan 5, located approximately 18,000 light-years from Earth in the constellation Sagittarius. It is part of a binary system and undergoes regular eclipses with an eclipse magnitude of about 40%. Its orbit is highly circular, with a 26-hour period. The other object in the system is at least 0.14 solar masses, with a radius of 5–6 solar radii. Hessels and collaborators state that the companion may be a "bloated main-sequence star, possibly still filling its Roche Lobe". Hessels and collaborators go on to speculate that gravitational radiation from the pulsar might be detectable by LIGO.

== See also ==
- PSR J0901–4046, longest period pulsar known
- PSR J0952–0607, second-fastest-spinning pulsar known
- NGC 6624, a globular cluster containing a neutron star spinning at possibly the same velocity.
