= The Galloway School =

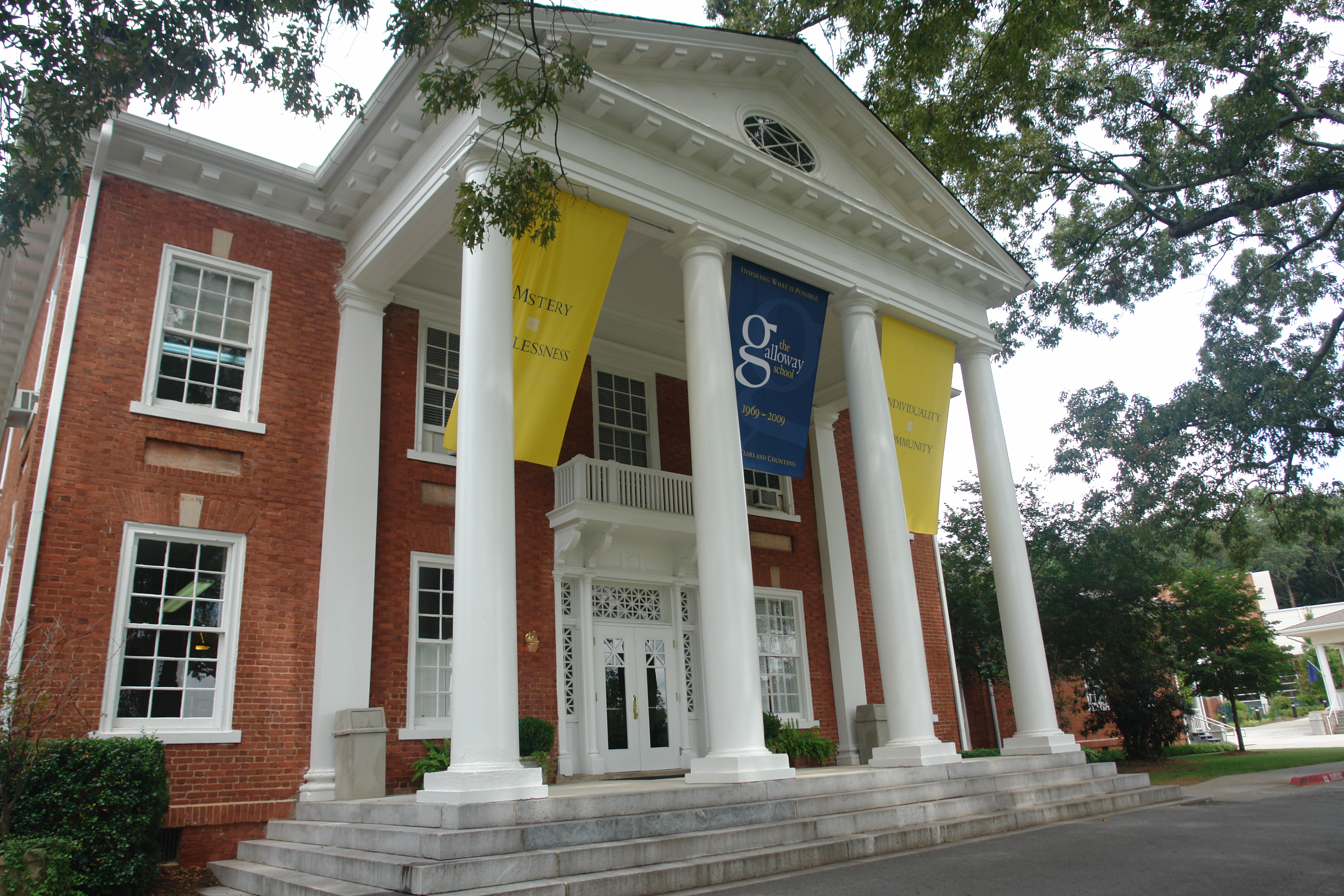
- The Galloway School, 2009

Location
- 215 Chastain Park Ave NW; Atlanta, Georgia 30342-3223; United States; 33°52′29″N 84°23′37″W

Information
- Type: Private
- Established: 1969
- Head of school: Amir Farokhi (2025-)
- Teaching staff: 102.5 (on an FTE basis)
- Grades: PK–12
- Enrollment: 771 (2020–21)
- Student to teacher ratio: 7.1
- Colors: Navy blue and gold
- Nickname: Scots
- Yearbook: Libertas
- Website: gallowayschool.org

The Galloway School is a private school in Atlanta, Georgia, United States. It was founded by Elliott Galloway in 1969 and preschool through grade 12.

== History ==
In 1969, Elliott Galloway, his wife Kitty and his friend Ross Arnold founded the Galloway School. Galloway had served in the U.S. Navy during World War II and the Korean War, and later taught at the Westminster Schools, later serving as principal of Westminster Middle School. He was named headmaster at Holy Innocents in 1965. The Galloway School opened its doors in 1969 to 380 students; the first class graduated in 1971.

Martin Luther King III was among the first students. King enrolled after he was denied admission at the Lovett School due to his race.

== Notable alumni ==
- Tabetha Boyajian - astronomer
- Amanda Doherty - professional golfer
- Todd English - restaurateur
- Paul L. Hertz - astrophysicist and NASA official
- Martin Luther King III - activist
- Emily Adams Bode Aujla - designer
