= Timing =

Timing is the tracking or planning of the spacing of events in time. It may refer to:

- Timekeeping, the process of measuring the passage of time
- Synchronization, controlling the timing of a process relative to another process
- Time metrology, the measurement of time

== Timing in different fields ==
- Timing (comedy), use of rhythm, tempo and pausing to enhance comedy and humour
- Timing (linguistics), rhythmic division of time into equal portions by a language
- Timing (music), ability to "keep time" accurately and to synchronise to an ensemble
- Color timing, photochemical process of altering and enhancing the color of an image
- Ignition timing, timing of piston and crankshaft so that a spark will occur near the end of the compression stroke
- Market timing, by attempting to predict future market price movements
- Memory timings (or RAM timings), measure of the performance of DRAM memory
- Valve timing, the precise timing of the opening and closing of the valves in a piston engine

== Media ==
- Timing (manhwa), a South Korean manhwa
- "Timing", a song by rapper YK Osiris
- "Timing", a song by Jaguar Wright from her 2005 album Divorcing Neo 2 Marry Soul
- Timing (EP), a 2014 Kim Hyun-joong EP
- Timing (film), a 2014 Korean film
