= LitSat-1 =

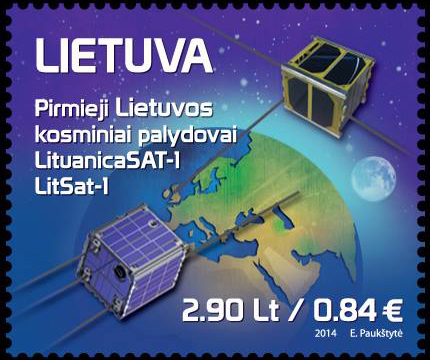
- Operator: LSA, LSSTI, KTU, VGTU
- COSPAR ID: 1998-067EP
- SATCAT no.: 39570
- Mission duration: 2 months 24 days deployed, 4 months 13 days in space (6 months planned)

Start of mission
- Launch date: 9 January 2014, 18:07 UTC
- Rocket: Antares 120
- Launch site: MARS LP-0A
- Contractor: Orbital Sciences
- Deployed from: ISS

End of mission
- Last contact: 21 May 2014 05:15:15 UTC
- Decay date: 22 May 2014

Orbital parameters
- Reference system: Geocentric
- Regime: Low Earth

LitSat-1 was one of the first two Lithuanian satellites (other one being Lituanica SAT-1). It was launched aboard the second Cygnus spacecraft along with 28 Flock-1 CubeSats aboard an Antares 120 carrier rocket flying from Pad 0B at the Mid-Atlantic Regional Spaceport on Wallops Island. The launch was scheduled to occur in December 2013, but later was rescheduled to 9 January 2014 and occurred then. The satellite was deployed from the International Space Station via the NanoRacks Cubesat Deployer on February 28, 2014. Three Lithuanian words will be broadcast from space "Lietuva myli laisvę" (Lithuania loves freedom). Launch of satellites Lituanica SAT-1 and LitSat-1 was broadcast live in Lithuania.

On 6 March 2014 the satellite radio station of Kaunas University of Technology (KTU) established a two-way connection with LitSat-1 for the first time.
