= Lithuanian Space Association =

Coordinates: 54°41′11″N 25°17′5″E

Lithuanian Space Association and Co
- Lietuvos aerokosmoso asociacija

Agency overview
- Formed: 2009
- Jurisdiction: Lithuania
- Headquarters: Gedimino pr. 3, Vilnius
- Agency executive: Vidmantas Tomkus, Director
- Child agency: Lithuanian Space Science and Technology Institute
- Website: Lithuanian Space Association

The Lithuanian Space Association (LSA; Lithuanian: Lietuvos kosmoso asociacija, LKA) is a space organisation based in Vilnius, Lithuania. It is one of the partners that created the first two Lithuanian satellites.

== History ==
In 2007 several Lithuanian institutions and enterprises signed a co-operation agreement to establish the National Technology Platform of Space Technologies and after a year the Government of Lithuania assigned the Ministry of Education and Science to start negotiations on co-operation with the European Space Agency.

In 2009 the Lithuanian Space Association was officially founded. In 2010 Space Science and Technology Institute was founded by Lithuanian Space Association.

In 2014, the LSA launched its first two satellites LitSat-1 and Lituanica SAT-1 via the NanoRacks SmallSat Deployment Program. They were deployed from the International Space Station on February 28, 2014.

Members of the first successful Lithuanian CubeSat project LituanicaSAT-1(one of two first European CubeSats launched from International Space Station) founded a company NanoAvionics.

== See also ==
- List of government space agencies
- Lithuanian Space Science and Technology Institute
- NanoAvionics
