= Dove-2 =

Earth observation satellite

- Mission type: Optical imaging
- Operator: Cosmogia
- COSPAR ID: 2013-015C
- SATCAT no.: 39132
- Mission duration: 180 days planned

Spacecraft properties
- Spacecraft type: 3U CubeSat
- Manufacturer: Cosmogia
- Launch mass: 5.8 kilograms (13 lb)

Start of mission
- Launch date: 19 April 2013, 10:00:00 UTC
- Rocket: Soyuz-2-1a
- Launch site: Baikonur 31/6

Orbital parameters
- Reference system: Geocentric
- Regime: Low Earth
- Perigee altitude: 569 kilometers (354 mi)
- Apogee altitude: 580 kilometers (360 mi)
- Inclination: 64.87 degrees
- Period: 1.60 hours
- Epoch: 31 October 2013, 03:04:08 UTC

Dove-2 is an Earth observation satellite launched as part of a private, commercial, space-based, remote sensing system, licensed to collect images of the Earth. It is currently undertaking an experimental mission in a 575 km circular orbit at an inclination of 64.9 degrees. The Commercial Remote Sensing Regulatory Affairs Office of the National Oceanic and Atmospheric Administration, an agency of the United States Department of Commerce, granted a license to Cosmogia Inc. to operate the Dove-2 mission. Cosmogia later changed its name to Planet Labs and started operating flocks of Dove satellites commercially.

The Dove-2 mission is an internal company technology demonstration experiment to test the capabilities of a low-cost spacecraft constrained to the 3U CubeSat form factor to host a small payload.

The Dove-2 satellite was launched at 10:00 UTC April 19, 2013 aboard a Soyuz-2.1a rocket from Baikonur Cosmodrome, Kazakhstan.
