= NanoAvionics =

Small satellite bus manufacturer and mission integrator

NanoAvionics Corp
- Industry: Aerospace Engineering, Nanosatellite Buses
- Founded: 1 January 2014
- Headquarters: Lithuania
- Area served: Worldwide
- Key people: Vytenis J. Buzas (CEO)
- Owner: Kongsberg Gruppen (77%)
- Website: nanoavionics.com

NanoAvionics Corp is a small satellite bus manufacturer and mission integrator founded as a spin-off from Vilnius University, Lithuania in 2014. The NanoAvionics core engineering team has implemented over 150 successful commercial missions and sold their products and services to over 50 countries.

== Overview ==
The company specializes in production of small satellite buses and development of commercial and scientific satellite missions: mission design, hardware assembly, integration and verification, testing campaigns, standardized products (highly integrated communication, on-board computer, attitude determination and control systems, solar panels, structural elements), modular chemical propulsion systems. It markets four multipurpose satellite buses: M16P, M12P, M6P and M3P made to confirm to 16U, 12U, 6U and 3U Cubesat standards correspondingly. Also, it offers modular microsatellite bus MP42 (up to 115 kg).

== History ==
In 2018, AST & Science acquired a controlling interest in NanoAvionics, and its CEO Abel Avellan became chairman of the board.

In 2022, Kongsberg Gruppen acquired 77 per cent of the company. AST & Science divested all its shares, while the management of NanoAvionics retained 23 percent.

== Implemented missions ==
- LituanicaSAT-1 is one of the two first Lithuanian satellites launched from the Wallops Flight Facility by Antares rocket, with the International Space Station (ISS) resupply cargo ship Cygnus 2 in January 2014.
- LituanicaSAT-2 is the second mission of NanoAvionics intended for EU project "QB50" led by the Von Karman Institute (VKI) for fluid dynamics (Belgium), under the European Commission's research and innovation program FP7 (2007–2013). LituanicaSAT-2 was developed by NanoAvionics under the contract with Vilnius University. LituanicaSAT-2 is consisting of three main modules: a science unit with the FIPEX (Flux-Φ-Probe Experiment) sensor for "QB50", a functional unit with NanoAvionics Command and Service module plus power unit and an experimental unit with the “green” propulsion system.
- Blue Walker 1 and M6P are two successful orbital missions based on NanoAvionics M6P nanosatellite bus. The first nanosatellite “Blue Walker 1” is a 6U satellite bus that was first of a series of satellites to test AST & Science technologies in space. The second nanosatellite “M6P” was a mission that hosted payloads from two companies specializing in Internet of Things (IoT) communication. Both were launched 1 April 2019 aboard a PSLV-QL rocket.
- LacunaSat-3, 2F - cubesats based on the M3P nano satellite bus on behalf of Lacuna Space. They make use of LoRaWAN (Long Range Wide Area Network) signals for direct-to-satellite IoT connectivity through the company's cloud-based Lacuna Network. LacunaSat-3 was launched in 2020 September on Soyuz-2-1b rocket, while LacunaSat-2F was launched on 15 April 2023 on a Falcon 9 Block 5 rocket as part of the Transporter-7 mission.
- R2 - NanoAvionics ride-share mission based on M6P nano satellite bus. Nanosatellite was launched in 2020 November from India on Polar Satellite Launch Vehicle C-49.
- Charlie - successful IoT/M2M mission based on M6P nano satellite bus. Nano satellite was launched in 2021 January as a part of the first SpaceX SmallSat rideshare program called Transporter-1 (spaceflight). It was launched on a Falcon 9 Block 5 rocket from Cape Canaveral Space Force Station, the United States.
- D2/AtlaCom-1 ride-share mission based on M6P nano satellite bus. It carried payloads from the "HyperActive" consortium comprising Dragonfly Aerospace, Space JLTZ and NanoAvionics itself, as well as an electric propulsion demonstration by Accion Systems. Nanosatellite was launched on 30 June 2021 as part of SpaceX Transporter-2 mission on a Falcon 9 Block 5 rocket from Cape Canaveral Space Force Station.
- Tiger-2, 4: cubesats built for OQ Technology's 5G constellation based on the M6P platform. Tiger-2 was launched on 30 June 2023 on board the SpaceX Transporter-2 mission, while Tiger-4 was launched on 12 June 2023 as part of the SpaceX Transporter-8 mission. Two more cubesats, Tiger-7 and Tiger-8, have been ordered by OQ Technology based on the same platform.
- DEWA SAT-1, 2: cubesats built for the emirati Dubai Electricity and Water Authority with the goal of using IoT technologies to support digitising energy networks, water distribution, and transmission networks. DEWA SAT-1 is based on the M3P bus, while DEWA SAT-2 is based on the M6P bus. They've been both launched on Falcon 9 Block 5 rockets, the first on 13 January 2022 as part of the Transporter-3 mission and the second on 15 April 2023 as part of the Transporter-7 mission.
- HYPSO-1, 2: NTNU mission for ocean monitoring. The two 6U cubesats are equipped with an hHyperspectral imager to track algal blooms and other biological activity in the ocean. The first has been launched on 13 January 2022 as part of the Transporter-3 mission while the second has been launched on 16 August 2024 as part of the Transporter-11 mission.
- MP42/Tiger-3 rideshare mission using for the first time the MP42 microsatellite bus, which is also their largest built satellite to date. It carries a cell tower for OQ Technology's 5G constellation and the RW500 reaction wheel for attitude control from VEOWARE. It was launched on 1 April 2022 on a Falcon 9 Block 5 rocket as part of SpaceX's Transporter-4 mission. The satellite reentered the atmosphere on 20 October 2024.
- Gama Alpha: successful mission based on the M6P nanosatellite bus to demonstrate the commercial solar sail of the French space startup Gama. The sail has a diameter of 73.3 m and it represents Europe's first solar sail mission. It was launched on 3 January 2023 as part of SpaceX's Transporter-6 mission.
- MilSpace2 : successful mission consisting of two nanosatellites (Birkeland and Huygens) based on the M6P bus and built for a consortium of the Dutch Royal NLR and TNO and the Norwegian FFI. The two nanosatellites will work to detect, classify, and accurately geolocate radio frequency signals and will fly at a close proximity of 20 kilometres. They were launched on 3 January 2023 as part of SpaceX's Transporter-6 mission.
- DROID.001: microsat based on the MP42 bus and built for Turion Space. It is a demonstrator for a planned constellation of satellites for the disposal of orbital debris. This first satellite is equipped with sensors to accurately track objects in orbit and measure their relative position, while future generations are expected to be able to perform debris removal and in-orbit servicing. It was launched on 12 June 2023 as part of the SpaceX Transporter-8 rideshare mission.
- GEISAT Precursor: 16U cubesat that serves as demonstrator for Satlantis' satellite constellation for methane emissions detection, It is equipped with the iSIM-90 high-resolution camera capable of providing a resolution of up to 2m and it has an expected lifespan of 4 years. It has been successfully launched on 12 June 2023 as part of the SpaceX Transporter-8 mission.
- MACSAT: on-orbit demonstrator for 5G IoT services based on the M6P platform for OQ Technologies. The cubesat is used to test advanced 5G IoT algorithms nd to qualify existing 5G NB (narrowband)-IoT chips. It was launched on 9 October 2023 on a Vega rideshare mission from the Guiana Space Centre.
- Lemu Nge: cubesat based on the M6P platform built for the Chilean company Lemu, and equipped with a hyper spectral camera with a ground resolution of less than 5 meters. It was launched on 16 August 2024 as part of the SpaceX Transporter-11 mission.
- Nightjar/TORO: two cubesats based on the M3P bus built for the Taiwan Space Agency and set to demonstrate respectively a software-defined radio (SDR) and an RGB imager. They were launched on 16 August 2024 as part of the SpaceX Transporter-11 mission.
- SkyBee-1, 2: satellites based on the MP42 bus built for the German company Constellr's, the first of its planned High-precision Versatile Ecosphere (HiVE) constellation. The satellites use thermal infrared imaging technology to measure land surface temperatures with unmatched 1-2 kelvin precision and 10 m spatial resolution. The first satellite was launched on 15 January 2025 as part of the SpaceX Transporter-12 rideshare mission, the second on 23 June 2025 as part of the SpaceX Transporter-14 mission.
- Arvaker-1,2,3: microsatellites based on the MP42H bus built for the Defence & Aerospace division of the parent company of NanoAvionics, Kongsberg Gruppen. They belong to the three-unit N3X constellation commissioned by the Norwegian Armed Forces to Kongsberg in 2024 to provide maritime surveillance data. They are equipped with an AIS receiver and a navigation radar detector. The first satellite has been launched on 15 March 2025 as part of the SpaceX Transporter-13 mission, followed by the other two on 23 June 2026 as part of the SpaceX Transporter-14 mission.
- QUICK³: cubesat based on the M3P bus and designed by the Technische Universität Berlin. The cubesat hosts a quantum light source integrated with an on-chip photonic processor, and it serves as a platform to test whether quantum communication hardware can reliably function in orbit and withstand the gravitational, thermal, vacuum, and radiation environments of space. It was launched on 23 June 2025 as part of the SpaceX Transporter-14 rideshare mission.
- Startical IOD-2: satellite based on the MP42 bus built for the Spanish company Startical. The satellite serves as a in-orbit demonstrator for Startical's planned constellation for air traffic management. It hosts radio payloads built by Indra Group, and it follows a first demonstrator built by Gom Space. IOD-2 was launched on 23 June 2026 as part of the SpaceX Transporter-14 rideshare mission.
- TPA-1: cubesat built for the Te Pūnaha Ātea – Space Institute of the University of Auckland and based on the M3P bus. It serves as a technology demonstration platform and it hosts including an Earth imager, a thermal monitoring payload, a deployable inspection boom, and a miniaturized dragsail for end-of-life disposal. It was launched on 23 June 2025 as part of the SpaceX Transporter-14 rideshare mission.
- Eycore-1: Polish Synthetic-aperture radar satellite launching in 2026.
- QUBE-II: German technology demonstration satellite for quantum key distribution, launching in 2026.

== Research and development ==
NanoAvionics Corp has been awarded a grant from EU's Horizon 2020 and ESA (among others) for developing a global IoT constellation-as-a-service aimed at IoT/M2M communication providers.

NanoAvionics Corp has also been awarded a grant from EC under research and innovation program "Horizon2020" for the project "Enabling Propulsion System for Small Satellites (EPSS) Market". The purpose of this project is to carry out a feasibility study for proposed propulsion system market potential and develop a business model for product development. Suggested new propulsion system is important for small satellite market suggesting green chemical propulsion system which makes use of an environmentally friendly propellant, and is a low cost integral plug and play design offering great economic advantages to the growing small satellite market, which presently suffers from the unavailability of a low cost, high performance propulsion solution. It is expected that the new technology will improve the precision and prolong the orbit lifetime of a satellite up to 5x: from 3–4 months up till 15–18.

NanoAvionics Corp, together with the National Centre for Physical Sciences and Technology (FTMC), Lithuania, also carried out a project on innovative catalytic materials for miniaturized monopropellant thruster systems.

== See also ==
- Kreios Space: a space company deveolping Very Low Earth Orbit (VLEO) satellites
