= Planet Labs =

American space technology company

Planet Labs PBC
- Formerly: Cosmogia, Inc.; Planet Labs, Inc.
- Type: Public
- Traded as: NYSE: PL
- Industry: Spacecraft design; Robotic spacecraft; Earth observation satellite; Image processing
- Founded: December 29, 2010; 15 years ago
- Founder: Chris Boshuizen; William Marshall; Robbie Schingler
- Headquarters: San Francisco, California, United States
- Area served: Worldwide
- Key people: William Marshall (CEO); Robbie Schingler (CSO)
- Products: "Dove", "RapidEye", and "SkySat" imaging satellites
- Services: Satellite-based Earth imaging and analytics
- Revenue: ▲US$191.3M (2022)
- Number of employees: 1090(as of 11 January 2023)
- Website: planet.com

Planet Labs PBC (formerly Planet Labs, Inc. and Cosmogia, Inc.), known as "Planet.", is a publicly traded American Earth imaging company based in San Francisco, California. Their goal is to image the entirety of the Earth daily to monitor changes and pinpoint trends.

The company designs and manufactures 3U-CubeSat miniature satellites called Doves that are then delivered into orbit as secondary payloads on other rocket launch missions. Each Dove is equipped with a high-powered telescope and camera programmed to capture different swaths of the Earth. Each Dove Earth observation satellite continuously scans Earth, sending data once it passes over a ground station, by means of a frame image sensor.

The images gathered by Doves, which can be accessed online and some of which are available under an open data access policy, provide up-to-date information relevant to climate monitoring, crop yield prediction, urban planning, and disaster response. With acquisition of BlackBridge in July 2015, Planet Labs had 87 Dove and 5 RapidEye satellites launched into orbit. In 2017, Planet launched an additional 88 Dove satellites, and Google sold its subsidiary Terra Bella and its SkySat satellite constellation to Planet Labs. By September 2018, the company had launched nearly 300 satellites, 150 of which are active. In 2020, Planet Labs launched six additional high-resolution SkySats, SkySats 16–21, and 35 Dove satellites.

Through a deal funded by Norway's Climate and Forests Initiative (NICFI), Planet and its partners Airbus and KSAT provided access to high-resolution basemaps of 64 tropical countries to help combat deforestation until April 2025. It also provides data to FAO's Framework for Ecosystem Monitoring (Ferm).

Following a January 2021 launch of 48 Planet SuperDoves, the company operated a global constellation of over 200 active satellites.

In July 2021 Planet Labs announced that they plan to become a public company and list on the New York Stock Exchange through a merger with the SPAC DMY Technology Group Inc IV. The deal would value Planet at US$2.8B. The business combination was completed on December 7, 2021. Planet registered as a public benefit corporation and formally changed its name to Planet Labs PBC. The stock began trading on the New York Stock Exchange on December 8, 2021. After the merger, Planet had more than $500 million in capital and about 190 satellites in orbit. The company expected it to take the next few years until they get to cashflow breakeven, funding their operations with $200 million from the aforementioned $500 million (the rest $300 million forming a "strategic warchest"). At the time of the merger, the company had over 600 customers (most customers, 90%, are annual subscriptions to Planet's data service) and it generated $113 million in revenue in 2020. At the time of the merger, Planet aimed to be profitable on an adjusted EBITDA basis by early 2025, and to grow its annual revenue to nearly $700 million by early 2026.

Planet Labs has contracts to supply imagery to various agencies of the US government, including the FAS, NOAA, Oak Ridge, Sandia, the Bureau of Reclamation, and NASA.

== History ==
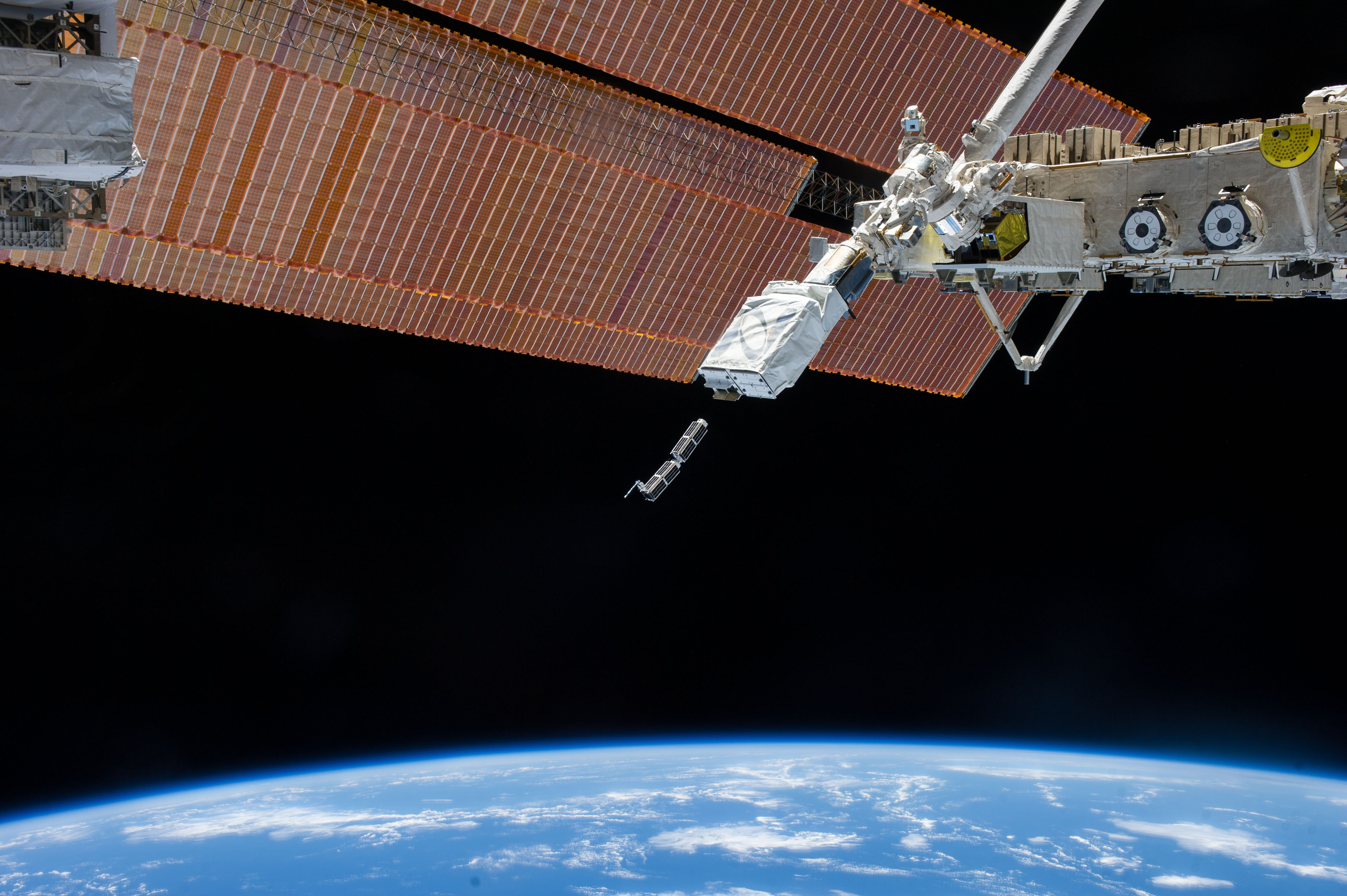
First pair of the 28 Planet Labs satellites launched from the ISS via the NanoRacks CubeSat Deployer (2014)

Planet Labs was founded in 2010 as Cosmogia by former NASA scientists Chris Boshuizen, Will Marshall, and Robbie Schingler, who teamed up with John Kuolt in 2011 during his studies at Oxford University with a thesis to leverage the processing power of mobile phones to power the avionics of a nano-satellite. Mr. Kuolt's EP (Entrepreneurial Project) at Oxford University became the original business plan for Planet. The initial goal of the company was to make use of information gathered from space to help with life on Earth. The group of scientists considered the problem with most satellites to be their large and clunky form, prompting them to build inexpensive and compact satellites to be manufactured in bulk, called CubeSats. The small group began building Planet's first satellite in a California garage.

Planet Labs launched two demonstration CubeSats, Dove 1 and Dove 2, in April 2013. Both Dove 1 (aboard Antares 110 rocket) and Dove 2 (aboard a Soyuz Rocket) were placed in a Sun-synchronous orbit. Dove 3 and Dove 4 were launched in November 2013.

In June 2013, it announced plans for Flock-1, a constellation of 28 Earth-observing satellites.

The Flock-1 CubeSats were brought to the International Space Station in January 2014 and deployed via the NanoRacks CubeSat Deployer in mid-February. The company planned to launch a total of 131 satellites by mid-2015.

In January 2015, the firm raised $95 million in funding. As of May 2015, Planet Labs raised a total amount of $183 million in venture capital financing.

In July 2015, Planet Labs acquired BlackBridge and its RapidEye constellation.

On April 18, 2017, Google completed the sale of Terra Bella and its SkySat satellite constellation to Planet Labs. As part of the sale, Google acquired an equity stake in Planet and entered into a multi-year agreement to purchase SkySat imaging data.

On January 21, 2018, a Dove Pioneer CubeSat was part of the payload of a Rocket Lab Electron rocket, the first orbital-entry craft launched from a privately owned and operated spaceport at Māhia Peninsula in New Zealand.

In July 2018, Planet laid off somewhat less than ten percent of its workforce. In September 2018, the company had launched a total of 298 satellites, 150 of which were still active.

On December 18, 2018, Planet announced they were in the process of acquiring the St Louis company, Boundless Spatial, Inc., a geospatial data software company.

Several weeks after their acquisition of Boundless, Planet's attorneys asserted that executives from Boundless had failed to disclose “information concerning material customer contracts,” and the acquisition was thereafter renegotiated down by more than half, from $40M to $16M. According to Quartz, the executives of Boundless had failed to disclose details concerning work, or details concerning future work, with the NGA.

On 3 July 2020, it was mentioned in the news that the company had "more than 120" active satellites at the time "providing daily imaging coverage over all of the world's landmass".

In August 2020, Planet completed its SkySat Constellation of 21 satellites by launching the final three SkySats on a SpaceX Falcon 9 rocket.

In May 2022, SES Government Solutions (now SES Space & Defense), a wholly owned subsidiary of communications satellite owner and operator, SES, in partnership with Planet Labs, was awarded a US$28.96 million contract from NASA's Communications Services Project for real-time, always-on low-latency connectivity services to NASA spacecraft in low-Earth orbit for routine missions, contingency operations, launch and ascent, and early operations phase communications, using SES's geostationary orbiting C-band satellites and medium Earth orbiting Ka-band satellites, including the O3b mPOWER constellation.

In August 2023, Planet cited "restructuring" as the reason for laying off 10% of its employees, about 120 individuals. CEO William Marshall released a statement saying, "I want to be clear that I am responsible for the decisions that led us here. I know this has significant effects on the lives of our team and their families, and for that I am sorry."

In March 2024, Planet Labs Federal, a subsidiary of Planet Labs, was awarded a contract by NIWC-PAC to incorporate Planet's SkySat and PlanetScope data into SeaVision.

In June 2024, Planet Labs announced a reduction of nearly 17% of its global workforce, equating to approximately 180 jobs. The company stated in a filing with the U.S. Securities and Exchange Commission that the layoffs were necessary to align resources with market opportunities, improve operational efficiency, and support long-term growth and profitability. The decision is expected to incur a one-off cost of around $9.5 million to $10.5 million.

In August 2024, Planet launched its first hyperspectral satellite, Tanager-1, along with 36 SuperDove satellites on the SpaceX Transporter-11 mission. Tanager-1 was developed as part of the Carbon Mapper Coalition to detect and quantify methane and carbon dioxide emissions. The company released the first light images from Tanager-1 in September 2024.

In January 2025, the company launched its second high-resolution Pelican satellite, Pelican-2, on SpaceX's Transporter-12 mission. That same month, Planet signed a multi-year $230 million agreement with SKY Perfect JSAT to build and operate a dedicated constellation of ten Pelican satellites for the Japanese satellite operator.

In July 2025, Planet announced a €240 million contract funded by the German government to provide dedicated satellite capacity and data services for European security and peace-keeping efforts.

In August 2025, the company launched two additional high-resolution satellites, Pelican-3 and Pelican-4.

In September 2025, Planet announced plans to open a new satellite manufacturing facility in Berlin. The facility is intended to double the production capacity of the Pelican satellite fleet and serves as an expansion of the company's European headquarters.

In March 2026, at the request of the US government, Planet imposed restrictions on its imagery during the 2026 Iran War. Initially, images from the Middle East were subject to a 14 day delay. This was later expanded into a complete ban on the release of new imagery of the region. In April 2026, The Washington Post reported that Chinese state media noted MizarVision's use of Planet Labs imaging in its analysis. A representative for Planet Labs stated that MizarVision, a Chinese geospatial analysis company, was not a client and denied the company's ownership of the images in question.

== Flock satellite constellations ==
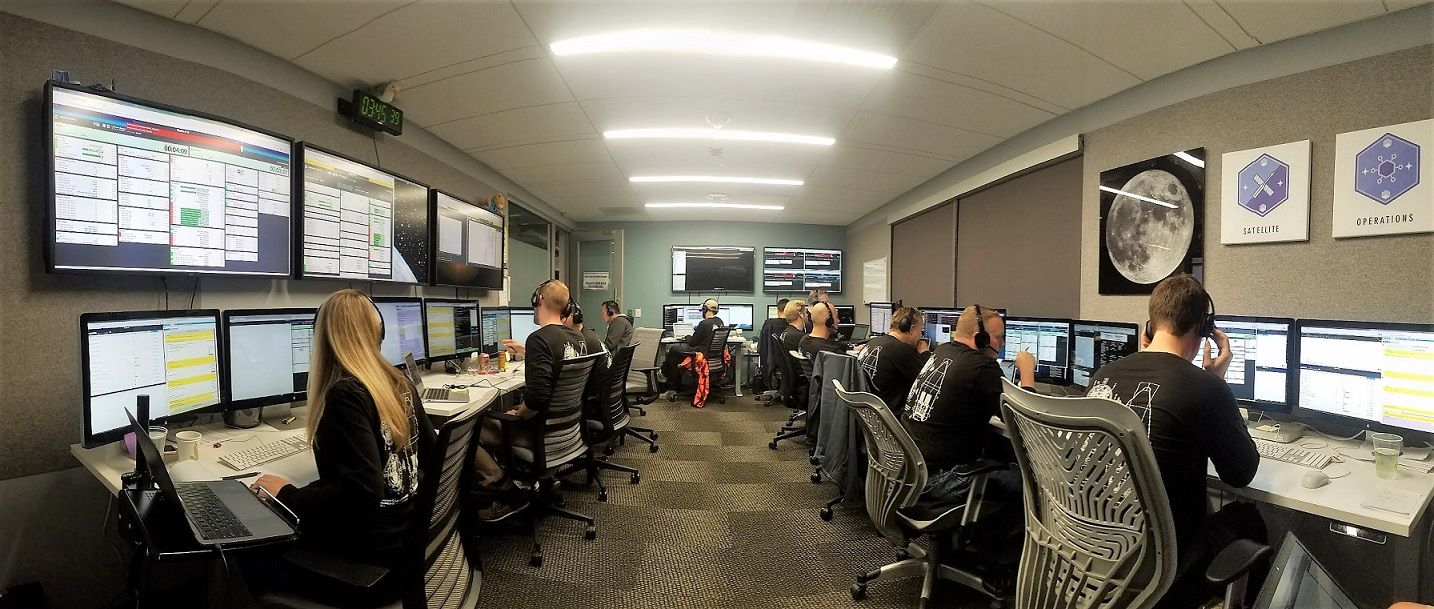
Planet Labs mission control

Planet's PlanetScope Dove satellite constellation is designed to observe Earth. By using several small satellites, CubeSats, the constellation produces high resolution images of Earth — 3–5 metres (10–16 ft) per pixel. The flock collects images from latitudes that are within 52 degrees of Earth's equator. A large portion of the world's agricultural regions and population lie within the area imaged by the flock. Initially, the mission used the ISS (International Space Station) and different track launch vehicles to get in orbit.

=== Dove ===
Planet's Dove satellites are CubeSats that weigh 4 kilograms (8.8 lb) (1000 times lower than other commercial imaging satellites), 10 by 10 by 30 centimetres (3.9 in × 3.9 in × 11.8 in) in length, width and height, orbit at a height of about 400 kilometres (250 mi) and provide imagery with a resolution of 3–5 metres (9.8–16.4 ft) and envisaged environmental, humanitarian, and business applications.

- Flock 1c, consisting of 11 Dove satellites, was successfully launched on 19 June 2014 with a Dnepr rocket on a record-breaking launch that carried to orbit the largest number of satellites up to that time, 37.
- Flock 1b, consisting of 28 Dove satellites, was successfully launched to the ISS on 13 July 2014 with the Cygnus Orb-2 cargo mission. All of those satellites have been deployed from the ISS but 6, that have been returned to Earth with the SpaceX CRS-5 on board a Falcon 9 rocket mission 212 days later.
- Flock 1d, consisting of 26 Dove satellites, was supposed to be carried to the ISS with the Cygnus Orb-3 cargo mission but was lost due the Antares rocket exploding seconds after liftoff.
- Flock 1d', consisting of 2 Dove satellites, was launched successfully as a replacement of the lost Flock 1d group on 10 January 2015 with the SpaceX CRS-5 cargo mission and was later deployed from the ISS on 3 March 2015. Decayed on 13 October and 17 December 2015 respectively.
- Flock 1e, consisting of 14 Dove satellites, was successfully launched on 14 April 2015 with the SpaceX CRS-6 cargo mission and was later deployed from the ISS between the 13 and the 16 July 2015.
- Flock 1f, consisting of 8 Dove satellites, was supposed to be carried to the ISS on 28 June 2015 with the SpaceX CRS-7 cargo mission but was lost due to the Falcon 9 rocket disintegrating 139 seconds into the flight.
- Flock 2b, consisting of 14 Dove satellites, was successfully launched on 19 August 2015 with the HTV-5 cargo mission and all but two satellites of the group has been deployed from the ISS, starting from 15 September 2015.
- Flock 2e, consisting of 12 Dove Satellites, was successfully launched on 6 December 2015 with the Cygnus OA-4 cargo mission and was deployed from the ISS between 17 May and 1 June 2016. Decayed between 25 July 2017 and 14 August 2018.
- Flock 2e', consisting of 20 Dove Satellites, was successfully launched on 23 March 2016 with the Cygnus OA-6 cargo mission and was deployed from the ISS between 17 May and 14 September 2016. Decayed between 3 October 2017 and 10 November 2018.
- Flock 2p, consisting of twelve Dove satellites, and Flock 3p, consisting of 88 Dove satellites, were launched from Satish Dhawan Space Centre in Sriharikota, India, by ISRO (Indian Space Research Organization) PSLV-C37 on 22 June 2016 and 15 February 2017, respectively. Flock 3p was the largest satellite fleet ever launched.
- Flock 2k, consisting of 48 Dove satellites, launched to 485 km altitude orbit on 14 July 2017 aboard Soyuz-2.1a.
- Flock 3m, consisting of 4 Dove satellites, was launched on 31 October 2017 on a Minotaur C rocket, along with six of Planet's SkySat satellites.
- Flock 3p', consisting of 4 Dove satellites, was launched in India ISRO's PSLV-C40 mission on 12 January 2018. Decayed between 18 March and 17 August 2023.
- A single Dove satellite nicknamed Dove Pioneer was launched on 21 January 2018 onboard the first successful flight (and second overall) of Rocket Lab Electron rocket. Decayed on 22 September 2019.
- Flock 3r, consisting of 16 Dove satellites, was successfully launched on 29 November 2018 with the PSLV-C43 mission.
- Flock 3s, consisting of 3 satellites, was successfully launched on 3 December 2018 to a 575 km altitude orbit aboard a SpaceX Falcon 9 rocket from Vandenberg Air Force Base in California. Decayed between 19 June and 13 December 2025.
- Flock 3k, consisting of 12 Dove satellites, was successfully launched on 27 December 2018. The flock was launched on a Soyuz Rocket from the Vostochny Cosmodrome in Russia into a sun-synchronous orbit. Decayed between 29 December 2022 and 28 February 2023.
- Flock 4a, launched 1 April 2019, consisting of 20 SuperDoves, was the first flock including satellites with improved imaging technology. The flock was delivered to 504 km sun-synchronous orbit on ISRO's PSLV-C45 rocket.
- Flock 4p, consisting of 12 SuperDoves with multiple spectral bands and other improvements, was launched at 03:58 UTC on 27 November 2019 by PSLV C47 into a sun-synchronous orbit.
- Flock 4e, consisting of 5 SuperDoves, was planned to be launched into a 500 km SSO orbit onboard Electron on 4 July 2020. However, due to a failure during the second stage burn, the payloads failed to reach orbit.
- Flock-4v, consisting of 26 SuperDoves, was successfully launched on 3 September 2020 with a Vega rocket as part of the Small Satellites Mission Service Proof of Concept (SSMS PoC) mission.
- Flock 4e', consisting of 9 SuperDoves, was successfully launched on Rocket Labs Electron Rocket on 28 October 28 2020.
- Flock 4s, consisting of 48 SuperDoves, was successfully launched on SpaceX's Transporter-1 mission. This record-breaking launch successfully deployed 143 satellites - the most ever on a single mission.
- Flock 4x, consisting of 44 SuperDoves, was successfully launched on SpaceX's Transporter-3 mission on 13 January 2022. Decayed between 9 March and 6 November 2024.
- Flock 4y, consisting of 36 SuperDoves, was successfully launched on SpaceX's Transporter-6 mission on 3 January 2023.
- Flock 4q, consisting of 36 SuperDoves, was successfully launched on SpaceX's Transporter-9 mission on 11 November 2023.
- Flock 4be, consisting of 36 SuperDoves, was successfully launched on SpaceX's Transporter-11 mission on 16 August 2024.
- Flock 4g, consisting of 36 SuperDoves, was successfully launched on SpaceX's Transporter-12 mission on 14 January 2025.
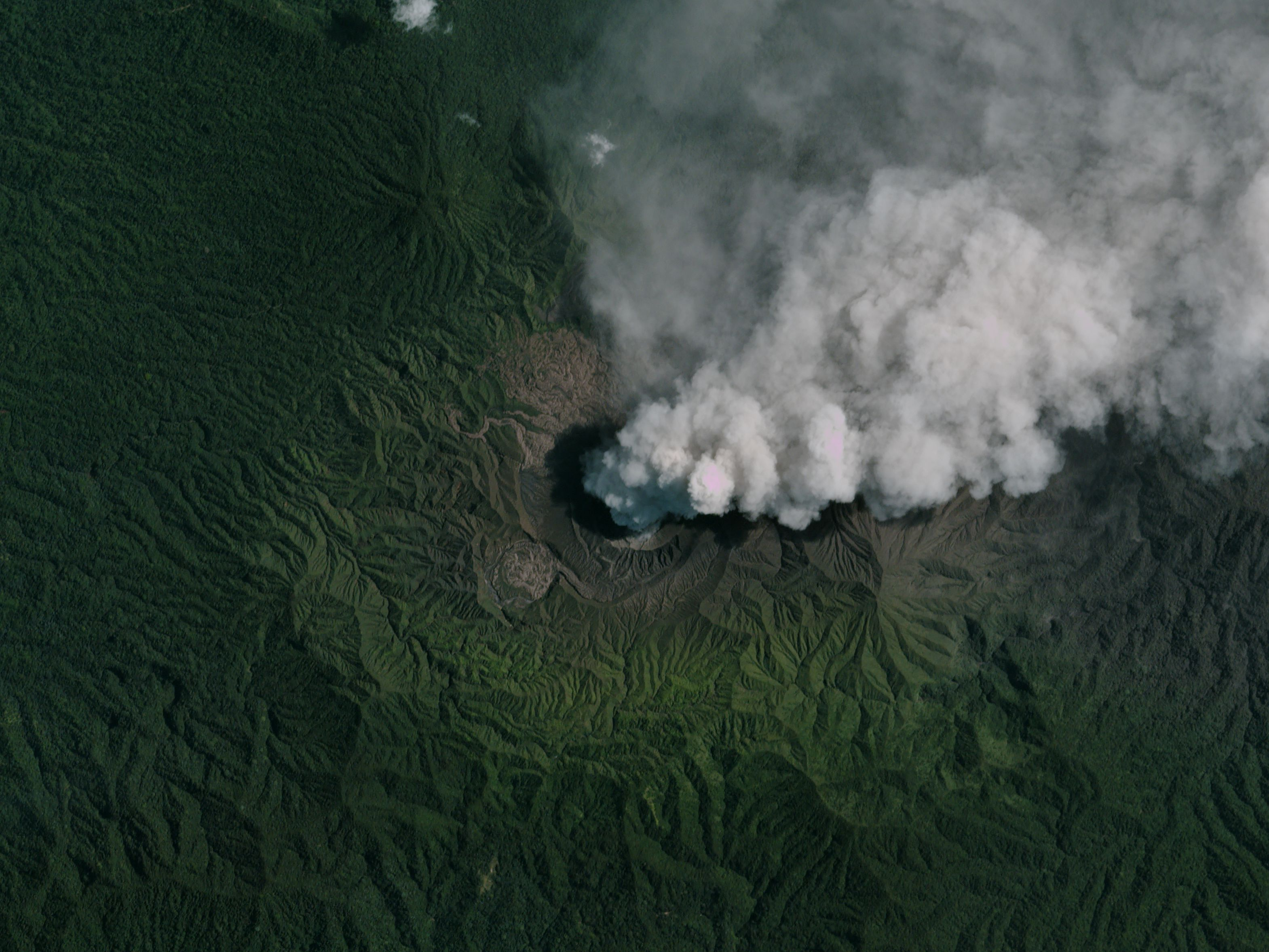
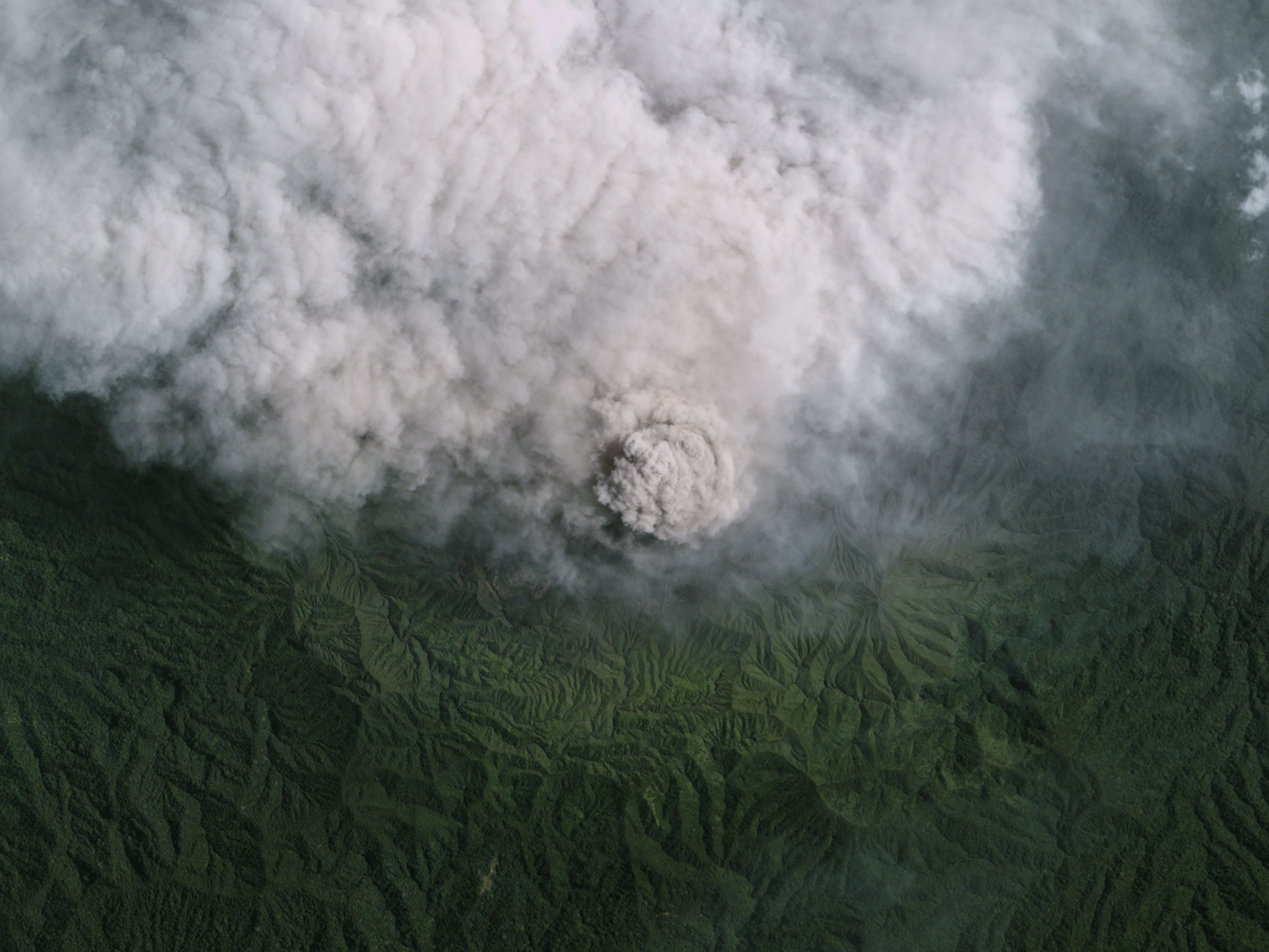
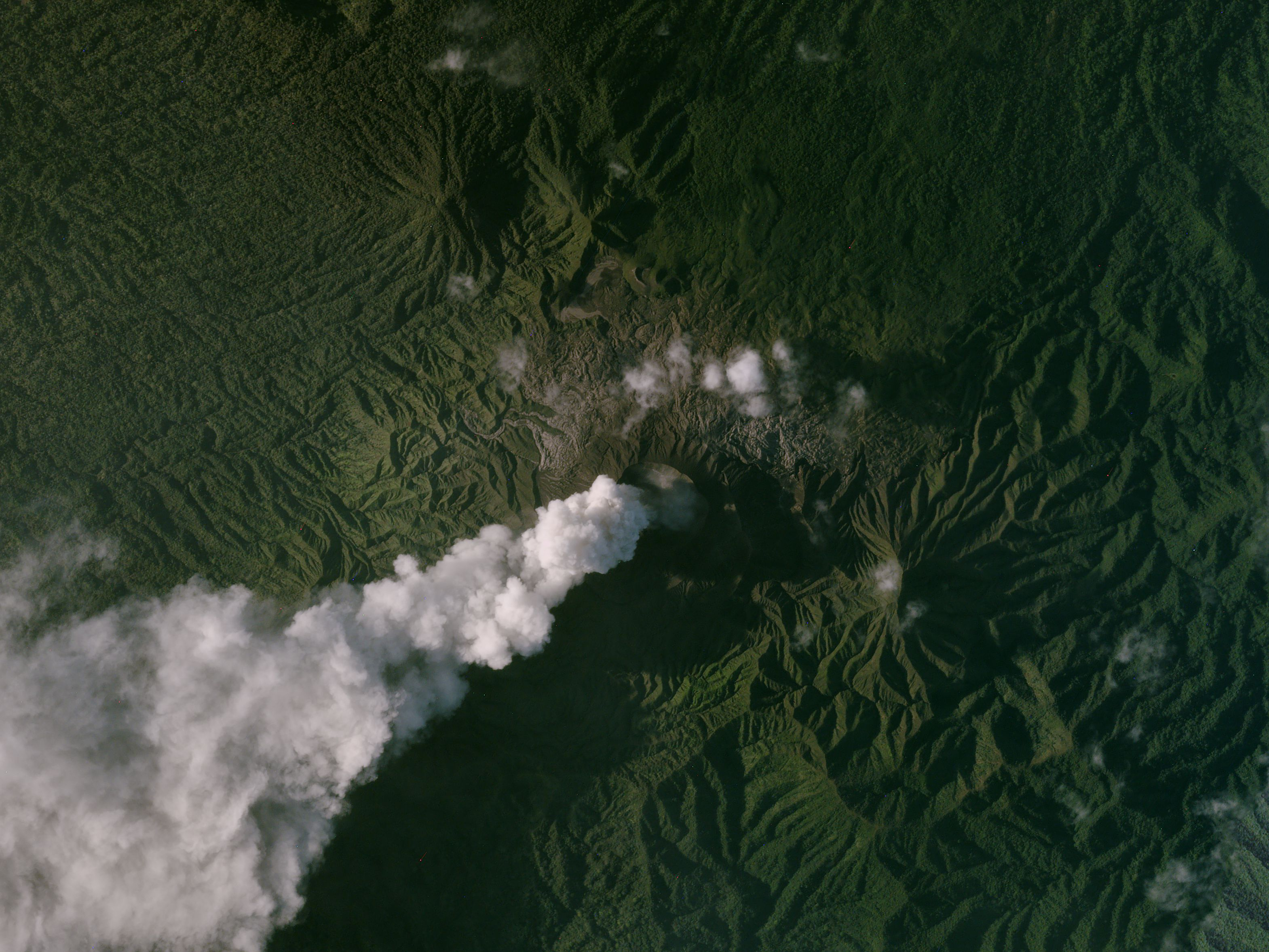
Three images of Mount Dukono located in the northern part of Halmahera island, Indonesia. Due to the Dove satellites orbiting in "flocks", it's possible to make daily or even hourly image updates of the Earth's surface.

=== RapidEye ===
RapidEye was a five-satellite constellation producing 5 metres (16 ft) resolution imagery that Planet acquired from the German company BlackBridge.

The satellites were built by Surrey Satellite Technology Ltd. (SSTL) of Guildford, subcontracted by MacDonald Dettwiler (MDA) of Richmond, Canada. Each satellite was based on an evolution of the flight-proven SSTL-150 bus, measuring less than 1 cubic metre (35 cu ft) and weighing 150 kilograms (330 lb) (bus + payload) each. They were launched on 29 August 2008 on a Dnepr rocket from Baikonur cosmodrome in Kazakhstan.

Each of RapidEye's five satellites contained identical Jena-Optronik Spaceborne Scanner JSS 56 multi-spectral pushbroom sensor imagers. The five satellites traveled on the same orbital plane (at an altitude of 630 km), and together were capable of collecting over 4 million kilometres (2.5×10^{6} mi) of 5 metres (16 ft) resolution, 5-band color imagery every day. They collected data in the Blue (440–510 nm), Green (520–590 nm), Red (630–690 nm), Red-Edge (690–730 nm) and Near-Infrared (760–880 nm).

The RapidEye constellation was officially retired in April 2020.

=== SkySat ===
SkySat is a constellation of sub-metre resolution Earth observation satellites that provide imagery, high-definition video and analytics services. Planet acquired the satellites with their purchase of Terra Bella (formerly Skybox Imaging), a Mountain View, California-based company founded in 2009 by Dan Berkenstock, Julian Mann, John Fenwick, and Ching-Yu Hu, from Google in 2017.

The SkySat satellites are based on using inexpensive automotive grade electronics and fast commercially available processors, but scaled up to approximately the size of a minifridge. The satellites are approximately 80 centimetres (31 in) long, compared to approximately 30 centimetres (12 in) for a 3U CubeSat, and weigh 100 kilograms (220 lb).

The first SkySat satellite, SkySat-1, was launched on a Dnepr (rocket) from Yasny, Russia on 21 November 2013, and the second, SkySat-2, launched on a Soyuz-2/Fregat rocket from Baikonur, Kazakhstan on 8 July 2014. Four more SkySat units were launched on 16 September 2016, by the Vega rocket's seventh flight from Kourou, and six more SkySat satellites, along with four Dove CubeSats, were launched on a Minotaur-C rocket from Vandenberg Air Force Base on 31 October 2017.

In 2020, Planet lowered their constellation of 15 SkySats from an altitude of 500 kilometers to 450 kilometers to improve the resolution of orthorectified imagery from 80 centimeters to 50 centimeters per pixel.

On June 13, 2020, SpaceX's Falcon 9 rocket successfully launched SkySats 16, 17 and 18 along with a batch of its Starlink communications satellites.

SkySats 19, 20 and 21 were launched on August 18, 2020 on SpaceX's Falcon 9 rocket. This completed the SkySat fleet of 21 high-resolution satellites.

When launched, the SkySat constellation was orbiting at an altitude of 450 kilometres (280 mi) and has a multispectral, panchromatic, and video sensor. It has a spatial resolution of 0.9 metres in its 400–900 nm panchromatic band, making it the smallest satellite to be put in orbit capable of such high resolution imagery. The multispectral sensor collects data in blue (450–515 nm), green (515–595 nm), red (605–695 nm), and near-infrared (740–900 nm) bands, all at 2 metre resolution.

=== Pelican ===
The Pelican constellation is a set of 0.5 m resolution Earth observation satellites designed to succeed the SkySat constellation. The spacecraft are based on a modular bus shared with the Tanager hyperspectral satellites and utilize Planet's next generation of imaging sensors. The constellation is designed for a revisit rate of up to 10 times per day globally and up to 30 times per day at mid-latitudes.

The first technology demonstrator, Pelican-1, launched on 11 November 2023 on the SpaceX Transporter-9 mission. Deployment of the operational constellation began in 2025:

- Pelican-2 launched on 14 January 2025 on SpaceX’s Transporter-12 mission. Planet released first light imagery from the satellite in March 2025.
- Pelican-3 and Pelican-4 launched on 26 August 2025.

The satellites utilize the NVIDIA Jetson platform for on-orbit edge computing, designed to process data before downlink to reduce latency.

In January 2025, Planet signed a $230 million agreement with SKY Perfect JSAT (JSAT) to build and operate ten Pelican satellites owned by JSAT. In July 2025, Planet announced a €240 million contract funded by the German government for dedicated capacity and direct downlink services on the Pelican constellation.

== See also ==
- Kepler Communications
- Lanteris Space Systems
- Robotic spacecraft
- Robert Simmon – Planet Senior Data Visualization Engineer
- Satellogic
- Spacecraft design
- SpaceX
- Spire Global
- Spot Image
- Vantor
