= Nanoracks CubeSat Deployer =

Device to deploy CubeSats into orbit from the International Space Station

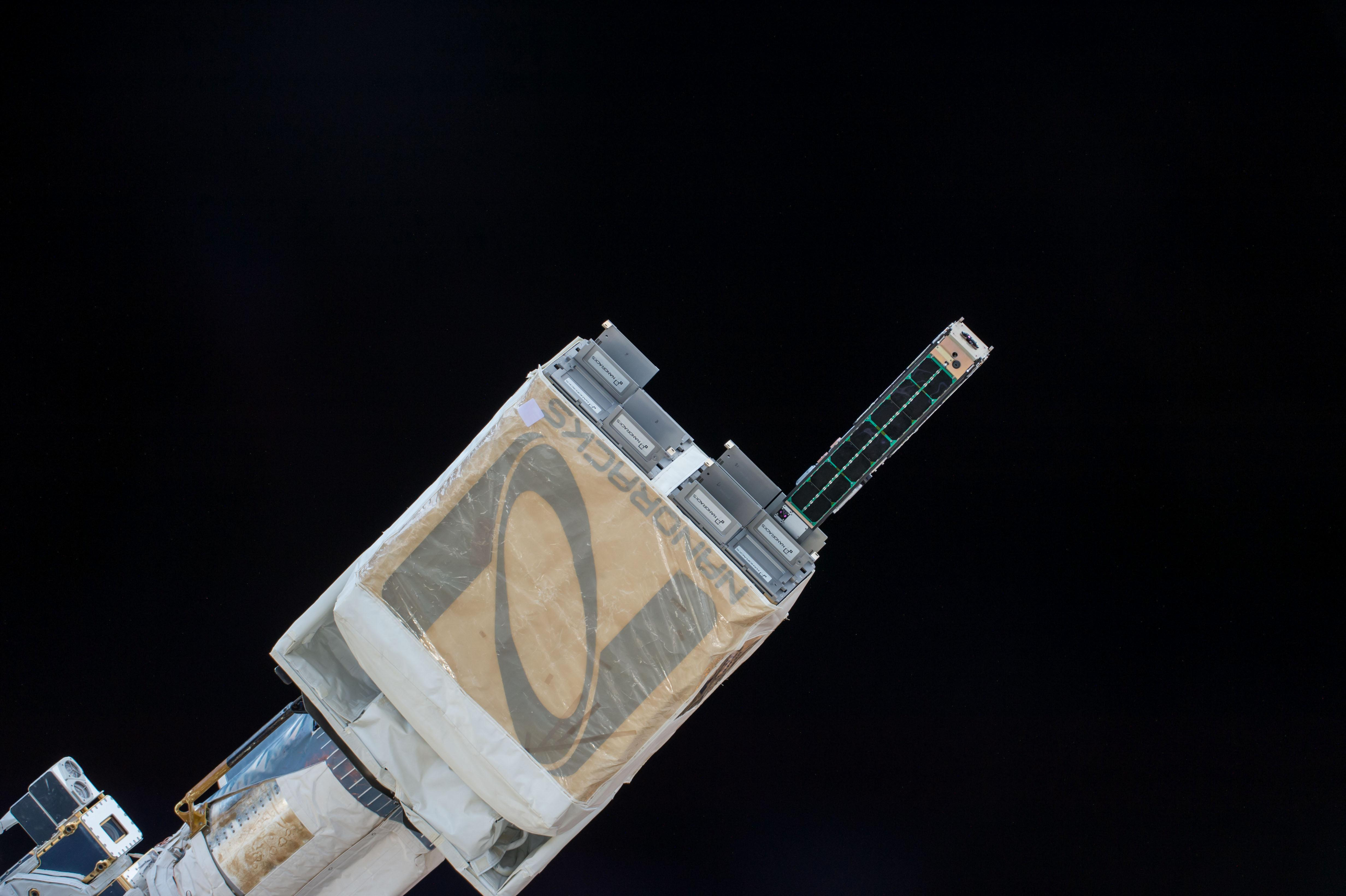
Nanoracks CubeSat Deployer

The Nanoracks CubeSat Deployer (NRCSD) is a device to deploy CubeSats into orbit from the International Space Station (ISS).

In 2014, two CubeSat deployers were on board the International Space Station (ISS): the Japanese Experiment Module (JEM) Small Satellite Orbital Deployer (J-SSOD) and the Nanoracks CubeSat Deployer (NRCSD). The J-SSOD is the first of its kind to deploy small satellites from the International Space Station (ISS). The NRCSD is the first commercially operated small satellite deployer from the ISS, maximizing full capabilities of each airlock cycle of deployments.

CubeSats belong to a class of research spacecraft called nanosatellites. The basic cube-shaped satellites measure 10 cm (3.9 in) on each side, weigh less than 1.4 kg (3.1 lb), and have a volume of about 1 L (0.22 imp gal; 0.26 US gal), although there are CubeSats which are built and deployed with sizes of multiples of 10 cm in length.

As of 2014, one method of getting CubeSats to orbit is to transport them aboard a larger spacecraft as part of a cargo load to a larger space station. When this is done, deploying the CubeSats into orbit as a separate artificial satellite requires a special apparatus, such as the Nanoracks CubeSat Deployer. The NRCSD is put into position to be grabbed by one of the ISS's robotic arms, which then places the CubeSat deployer into the correct position externally mounted to the ISS to be able to release the miniature satellites into proper orbit.

== Background ==
The International Space Station was designed to be used as both a microgravity laboratory, as well as a launch pad for low Earth orbit services. The Japanese Space Agency's (JAXA) Kibō ISS module includes a small satellite-deployment system called the J-SSOD.

Nanoracks, via its Space Act Agreement with NASA, deployed a CubeSat using the J-SSOD. Seeing the emerging market demand for CubeSats, Nanoracks self-funded its own ISS deployer, with the permission of both NASA and JAXA. Nanoracks evolved away from the J-SSOD due to the small number of satellites that could be deployed in one airlock cycle and their desire to maximize the capacity of each airlock cycle. The J-SSOD used a full airlock cycle to only launch 6U. The Nanoracks CubeSat Deployer uses two airlock cycles, each holding 8 deployers. Each deployer is capable of holding 6U, allowing a total of 48U per airlock cycle.

Deploying CubeSats from ISS has a number of benefits. Launching the vehicles aboard the logistics carrier of ISS visiting vehicle reduces the vibration and loads they have to encounter during launch. In addition, they can be packed in protective materials so that the probability of CubeSat damage during launch is reduced significantly. In addition, for earth observation satellites, such as those of Planet Labs, the lower orbit of the ISS orbit, at roughly 400 km, is an advantage. In addition, the lower orbit allows a natural decay of the satellites, thus reducing the build-up of orbital debris.

== History ==
=== JEM Small Satellite Orbital Deployer ===
The Japanese Experiment Module Small Satellite Orbital Deployer (J-SSOD) is the first of its kind to deploy small satellites from the International Space Station. The facility provides a unique satellite install case to the Japanese Experiment Module (JEM) Remote Manipulator System (RMS) for deploying small, CubeSat, satellites from the ISS. The J-SSOD holds up to 3 small one-unit (1U, 10 x 10 x 10 cm) small CubeSats per satellite install case, 6 in total, though other sizes up to 55 x 55 x 35 cm may also be used. Each pre-packed satellite install case is loaded by crewmembers onto the Multi-Purpose Experiment Platform (MPEP) within the JEM habitable volume. The MPEP platform is then attached to the JEM Slide Table inside the JEM airlock for transfer to the JEMRMS and space environment. The JEMRMS grapples and maneuvers the MPEP and J-SSOD to a predefined deployment orientation and then jettisons the small CubeSat satellites.

The MPEP is a platform that acts as an interface between operations inside and outside the ISS, and the J-SSOD mechanism is installed on this platform. On 21 July 2012, JAXA launched the Kounotori 3 (HTV-3) cargo spacecraft to the ISS on Expedition 33. The J-SSOD was a payload on this flight along with five CubeSats that were planned to be deployed by the J-SSOD mounted on the JEMRMS (JEM- Remote Manipulator System), a robotic arm, later in 2012. The five CubeSats were deployed successfully on 4 October 2012 by the JAXA astronaut Akihiko Hoshide using the newly installed J-SSOD. This represented the first deployment service of J-SSOD.

=== Nanoracks CubeSat Deployer development ===
In October 2013, Nanoracks became the first company to coordinate the deployment of small satellites (CubeSats/nanosatellites) from the ISS via the airlock in the Japanese Kibō module. This deployment was done by Nanoracks using J-SSOD. Nanoracks' first customer was FPT University, Hanoi, Vietnam. Their F-1 CubeSat was developed by young engineers and students at FSpace laboratory at FPT University, Hanoi. The mission of F-1 was to "survive" the space environment for one month, measuring temperature and magnetic data while taking low-resolution photos of Earth.

In 2013, Nanoracks sought permission from NASA to develop their own hardware and CubeSat/SmallSat deployer to use over the JEM-Small Satellite Deployer. Nanoracks brought leadership to the American small satellite industry by building a larger deployer capable of deploying 48U of satellites. Nanoracks designed, manufactured, and tested the deployer for NASA and JAXA approval to reach the International Space Station.

The Nanoracks CubeSat Deployer was launched on 9 January 2014, on the Orbital Sciences Cygnus CRS Orb-1 mission along with 33 small satellites.

== Manufacturing the NRCSD ==
Quad-M, Inc. developed the CubeSat Deployer to be compliant with the Cal Poly standard. It was redesigned and manufactured to Nanoracks' specification for use on the International Space Station. Quad-M performed an initial design analysis to ensure a compliant design. The structural analysis included a modal analysis to evaluate vibration response, and the thermal analysis included calculations to evaluate different door coating options and an initial transient thermal analysis to estimate. In addition, Quad-M performed development tests for: the door release, the CSD/CubeSat Deployment test, random vibration test, and temperature cycling.

== Mission profile ==
=== Integrating the CubeSats ===
CubeSat integration begins with unpacking the CSD from the shipping container and then removing the Base Plate Assembly from the rear of the CSD. Next, the CubeSat is inserted from the rear and is slid up snug against the doors. Additional CubeSats are then inserted from the rear in the same progress. The Base Plate Assembly is then reinstalled. Four jack screws are then adjusted with the Pusher Plate and locked. The Containment Bolt is then removed, and the deployer is packed for shipment.

=== Orbital Sciences CRS Orb-1 ===
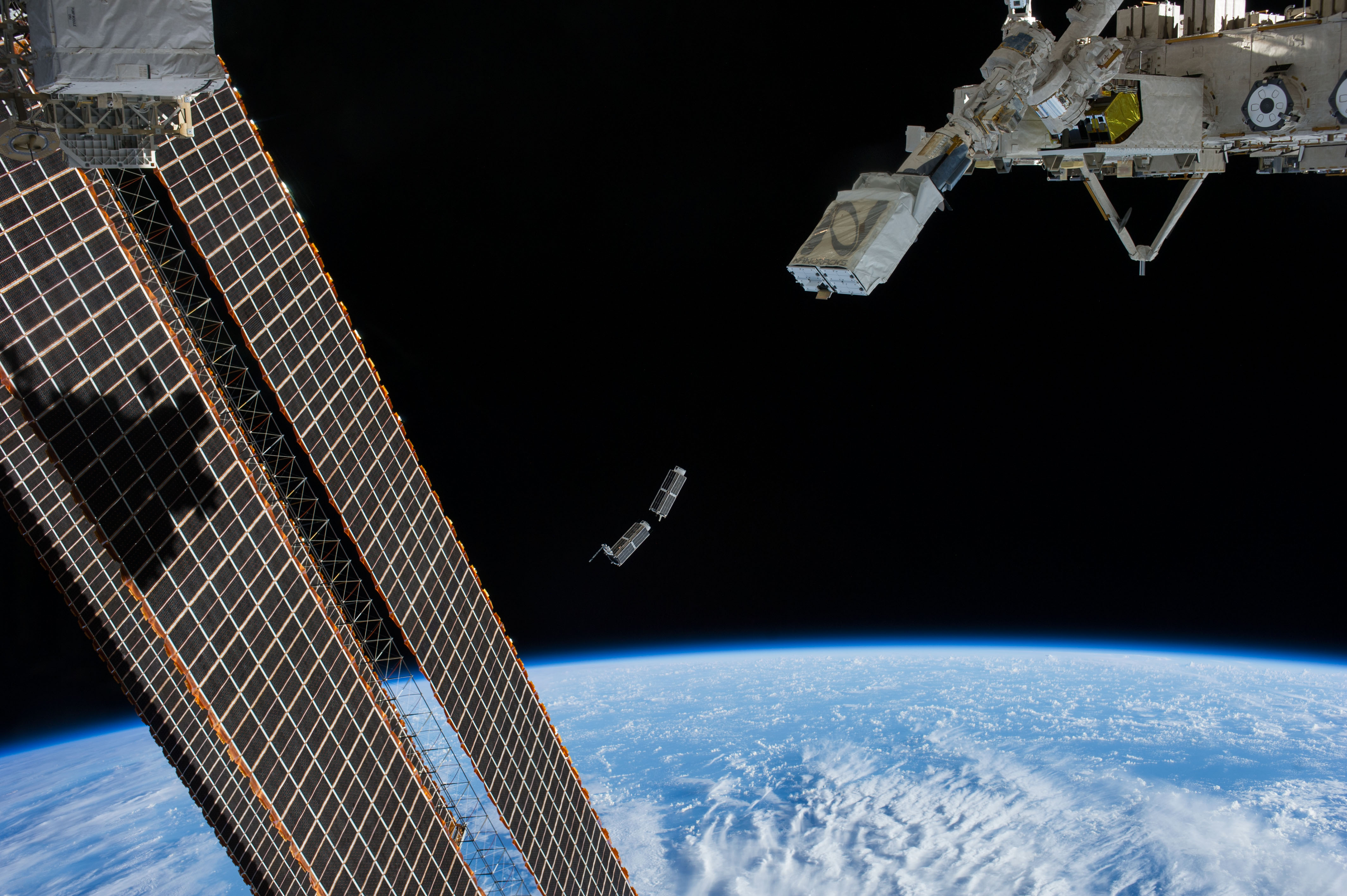
A set of Nanoracks CubeSats is deployed by the Nanoracks CubeSat Deployer attached to the end of the Japanese robotic arm (25 February 2014).

Launch vehicle: Orbital Sciences Cygnus (Orb-1)
Launch date: 9 January 2014
Total number of CubeSats: 33

- Planet Labs: Doves, Flock 1A (28)

Purpose: These 28 3U CubeSats are working to build an Earth-observation constellation based solely on CubeSats. The CubeSats contain batteries that provide power to the various systems in each Dove. Each satellite has an optical telescope for acquiring high-resolution images of Earth. Each satellites uses an X-band system for the downlink of acquired images and systems telemetry at data rates of 120 Mbit/s.

- NanoSatisfi: ArduSat (1)

Purpose: This 2U CubeSat will provide a platform for students and space enthusiasts to run space-based Arduino experiments. This is a follow-up of ArduSat-1 launched in November 2013.

- Kaunas University of Technology: LitSat-1 (1)

Purpose: To use low-cost open-source hardware and software for its flight computers that will control the satellite payload. The CubeSat carries a VGA camera, a GPS receiver, a linear transponder, and an AX-25 packet radio transponder.

- Vilnius University: LituanicaSAT-1 (1)

Purpose: One of Lithuania's first satellites (together with LitSat-1). This CubeSat is equipped with a low resolution VGA camera, GPS receiver, 9k6 AX25 FSK telemetry beacon, UHF CW beacon, and a 150 mW V/U FM mode voice repeater. The satellite will transmit payload and sensor data images and three Lithuanian words.

- Southern Stars: SkyCube (1)

Purpose: This crowd-funded 1.3-kilogram 1U satellites that features deployable solar panels, four cameras, and communication antennas that are used to receive messages from Earth that are then transmitted at pre-determined times.

- University of Peru: UAPSat-1 (1)

Purpose: This 1U CubeSat uses body-mounted solar panels for power-generation. It is equipped with a minicomputer, radio transmitters/receivers, a power control module, and a basic attitude control system. The satellite will transmit telemetry data and temperature sensor readings from inside and outside the spacecraft.

=== Orbital Sciences CRS Orb-2 ===
Launch vehicle: Orbital Sciences Cygnus (Orb-2)
Launch date: 13 July 2014
Total number of CubeSats: 32

- Planet Labs: Doves, Flock 1A (28)

Purpose: These 28 3U CubeSats are working to build an Earth-observation constellation based solely on CubeSats. The CubeSats contain batteries that provide power to the various systems in each Dove. Each satellite has an optical telescope for acquiring high-resolution images of earth. Each satellites uses an X-band system for the downlink of acquired images and systems telemetry at data rates of 120 Mbit/s.

- NASA Ames Research Center/San Jose State University: TechEdSat-4 (1)

Purpose: This satellites uses commercial off-the-shelf components to provide the basic satellites functions such as commanding, power generation and supply, and communications with the other two units of the satellites. The CubeSat will fly and Exo-Brake to orbit that is deployed once the satellite is released to demonstrate a Passive De-Orbit System for satellites.

- MIT Lincoln Laboratory: MicroMAS: Microsized Microwave Atmospheric Satellite (1)

Purpose: This satellite carries a nine-channel passive microwave radiometer to demonstrate miniaturized radiometer technology in space for application in ultra-compact spacecraft systems such as high performance multi-band sounder for future weather satellites.

- GEARSSAAT (1)

Purpose: This satellite is equipped with Globalstar communications terminals that will perform studies involving the Globalstar communications satellite constellation.

- Lambda Team: Lambdasat (1)

Purpose: The spacecraft will conduct technical demonstration of the satellite bus in the radiation environment in space and track systems degradation. The satellite also carries and Automatic Identification System (AIS) for tracking sea vessels around the globe, and a science experiment that looks at Graphene in space.
