= MizarVision =

Chinese satellite imaging company

- Type: Private
- Industry: Satellite imagery
- Founded: 2021; 5 years ago in Hangzhou, China
- Headquarters: Hangzhou, China
- Area served: Worldwide
- Website: mizarvision.com

MizarVision, otherwise known as Meentropy Technology Hangzhou Co Ltd, is a Chinese satellite remote sensing and geospatial analysis company founded in 2021. The firm has assisted with intelligence-related operations, including the detailing of military movements. It does so by analyzing satellite imaging from Chinese and Western images, including commercially available imagery, filtering the content using artificial intelligence.

== History ==
MizarVision was founded in 2021 in Hangzhou, China. The company holds a National Military Standard certification, but is not part of the Chinese People's Liberation Army. The Government of China holds a 5.5% ownership stake in the company.

In 2024, the South China Morning Post reported on MizarVision's imaging of a Chinese aircraft carrier's patrol of waters near the Philippines, which was believed to be the Chinese aircraft carrier Shandong. At that time, the company was based in Shanghai, China.

In 2026, The Washington Post reported that Chinese state media noted the firm's use of Planet Labs imaging in its analysis. A representative for Planet Labs stated that MizarVision was not a client and denied the company's ownership of the images in question.

=== Role in war ===
Prior to the 2026 Israeli–United States strikes on Iran, MizarVision published satellite photos of a buildup of aircraft at the Israeli Ovda Airbase, including F-22 fighter jets. The firm has also released imaging surrounding the buildup of military forces before and movements of US KC-135 and KC-46 tankers during Operation Epic Fury (including the passage of the aircraft carriers USS Gerald R. Ford and USS Abraham Lincoln), and massing of aircraft at Saudi Arabia's Prince Sultan Air Base, and Qatar's Al-Udeid Air Base. MizarVision has also published satellite imagery of the Russo-Ukrainian war.

In May 2026, the United States Department of State placed MizarVision, along with other entities, under sanctions for "having provided having provided to Iran any technical training, financial resources or services, advice, other services, or assistance related to the supply, sale, transfer, manufacture, maintenance, or use of arms and related materiel described in Section 1(a)(i) of E.O. 13949."
