= William Marshall (entrepreneur) =

English entrepreneur and physicist

- Born: England
- Education: University of Leicester (MPhys); University of Oxford (PhD)
- Occupations: Businessperson; astrophysicist
- Organization: Planet
- Known for: Co-founding Planet; World Economic Forum Young Global Leader; Co-creating Open Lunar Foundation
- Website: www.planet.com/company/#team

William Marshall, also known as Will Marshall, is an English physicist and entrepreneur. He is the founder and CEO of Planet, a satellite and Earth data company based in San Francisco, California. Marshall co-founded Planet with Chris Boshuizen and Robbie Schingler in 2010.

The company he co-founded and leads was the first in the world to launch a constellation of small and cheap satellites into low earth orbit, largely based on Marshall's vision and experiments prior to the company being founded. The revolutionary method has since been copied by Elon Musk's Starlink, and other organizations and countries, seeking to capitalize on the advancements in cheap consumer-grade electronics, small satellites and cheap launch options. He pioneered a vision of manufacturing hundreds or thousands of very small satellites using cheap consumer-grade technology from the cell-phone industry. These satellites are launched cheaply due to their low weight, utilized for approximately two years, and eventually burn up in orbit. They are then replaced by new satellites using the next generation of consumer-grade technology.

== History ==
Marshall received his doctorate from Oxford University in Physics under the mentorship of Sir Roger Penrose and Dirk Bouwmeester, where he worked on experiments testing the foundations of quantum mechanics. While working as a scientist at the NASA Ames Research Center in Mountain View, California, Marshall was on the science team for LCROSS, which first confirmed the presence of large quantities of water on the Moon, with implications for lunar settlement. Marshall researched orbital space debris remediation methods, including co-inventing a method for debris-debris collision avoidance using ground-based lasers, and served as co-principal investigator of PhoneSat, which tested smartphones for use in space and inspired Planet. Marshall has given two TED talks. He is a central figure in Ashlee Vance's book When the Heavens Went on Sale (2023), chapters one through seven are an in-depth biography and description of his career. In 2024, Marshall received an RPS (The Royal Photographic Society) Award for Environmental Responsibility, alongside Robbie Schingler.
