= Lithuanian Space Science and Technology Institute =

Private research organisation

Lithuanian Space Science and Technology Institute Kosmoso mokslų ir technologijų institutas
- Founder: Lithuanian Space Association
- Established: 2010
- Focus: Space-oriented
- Address: Saulėtekio al. 15
- Location: Vilnius, Lithuania
- Coordinates: 54°43′24″N 25°20′14″E
- Website: Lithuanian Space Science and Technology Institute

Lithuanian Space Science and Technology Institute (Lithuanian: Kosmoso mokslo ir technologijų institutas) is private research organization established by the Lithuanian Space Association in 2010, based in Vilnius, Lithuania.

In 2013 LSSTI was one of the creators of one of the first two scientific nano-satellites in Lithuania, which were intended both for scientific tasks, technologies demonstrations, educational purposes and popularization of science. The satellite was successfully launched in 2014.

LSSTI is a member of Neva Consortium.

== See also ==
- Lithuanian Space Association
- NanoAvionics
