= Kreios Space =

Spanish space company

- Type: Private
- Industry: Aerospace
- Founded: 2021
- Founders: Adrián Senar; Jan Mataró; Francisco Boira
- Headquarters: Vigo, Galicia, Spain
- Key people: Adrián Senar (CEO); Jan Mataró (CTO); Francisco Boira (CCO)
- Products: VLEO satellite platforms Air-breathing electric propulsion
- Services: Very Low Earth Orbit satellite technology
- Website: www.kreiosspace.com

Kreios Space is a Spanish space company that develops satellite platforms for sustained operations in Very Low Earth Orbit (VLEO), an orbital region between 150 and 300 kilometres above Earth. Its core technology is a proprietary air‑breathing electric propulsion (ABEP) system, which enables satellites to use residual atmospheric particles as propellant instead of carrying onboard fuel. The company is headquartered in Vigo, Spain.

== History ==
Kreios Space was established in 2021 by a group of young engineers with backgrounds in plasma propulsion , space systems, and aerospace engineering who turned their doctoral thesis into a business: a company founded to enable sustained satellite operations in Very Low Earth Orbit (VLEO), a region traditionally constrained by atmospheric drag.

Kreios Space presented the third generation of its Helicon Plasma Thruster (K‑3), tested with mixtures of oxygen, nitrogen, argon, and air under representative environmental conditions, achieving efficiencies superior to any development known to date, both in industry and academia, marking a true milestone in the field of space propulsion.

== Technology ==
Kreios Space develops a proprietary satellite platform based on an Air-Breathing Electric Propulsion (ABEP) system that allows it to operate autonomously and for many years in Very Low Earth Orbit (VLEO). The technology enables spacecraft to maintain stable flight at altitudes between 150 and 300 kilometres, a region traditionally difficult to access due to atmospheric drag.

This propulsion concept eliminates the need for onboard propellant and mitigates erosion caused by atomic oxygen, allowing multi‑year operations in orbital regimes where conventional satellites can only remain for a few days. Operating in VLEO provides several performance benefits, including higher spatial resolution for Earth‑observation, increased signal level for D2C, lower communication latency, and natural orbital decay that helps reduce space debris.

== Missions ==
Kreios Space is preparing its first In‑Orbit Demonstration (IOD), planned for late. A second mission, scheduled for 2029, will integrate a commercial payload, marking the transition from a technology demonstration stage to a commercial phase.
