= LituanicaSAT-1 =

Lithuanian satellite launched in 2014

Lituanica SAT-1
- Operator: Vilnius University, Innovative Engineering Projects, NPO
- COSPAR ID: 1998-067EN
- SATCAT no.: 39569
- Website: www.astronauts.lt
- Mission duration: 5 months deployed, 6 months 19 days in space (planned mission: 6 months)

Spacecraft properties
- Manufacturer: Innovative Engineering Projects, NPO
- Dry mass: 1090 g.

Start of mission
- Launch date: 9 January 2014, 18:07 UTC
- Rocket: Antares 120
- Launch site: MARS LP-0A
- Contractor: Orbital Sciences
- Deployed from: ISS
- Deployment date: 28 February 2014

End of mission
- Decay date: 28 July 2014

Orbital parameters
- Reference system: Geocentric
- Regime: Low Earth

LituanicaSAT-1 was one of the first two Lithuanian satellites (other one being LitSat-1). It was launched along with the second Cygnus spacecraft and 28 Flock-1 CubeSats aboard an Antares 120 carrier rocket flying from Pad 0B at the Mid-Atlantic Regional Spaceport on Wallops Island to the International Space Station. The launch was scheduled to occur in December 2013, but later was rescheduled to 9 January 2014 and occurred then. The satellite was broadcasting greetings of Lithuanian president, Mrs. Dalia Grybauskaitė. The satellite was deployed from the International Space Station via the NanoRacks CubeSat Deployer on 28 February 2014. All LituanicaSAT-1 subsystems have been turned on, tested and proved to be working properly. The mission is considered a complete success by its team of engineers. The mission ended upon the reentry and disintegration of the satellite on 28 July 2014.

== Description ==
The satellite conforms to standard 1U size cubesat form factor as to the latest cubesat design specifications. The satellite does not have any active systems except the antenna deployment mechanism that is engaged 30 minutes after deployment sequence. Both attitude and thermal control sub-systems are implemented passively for simplicity and safety. The total mass of the body including the equipment within it is 1,090 g.

== Subsystems ==
=== Attitude determination and control ===
LituanicaSAT-1 uses passive magnetic attitude control system consisting of permanent magnets that create a control torque and soft magnets that provide dampening torque using hysteresis effect. Following attitude sensors are implemented for attitude determination:

- PS-MPU-6000A MEMS motion sensor
- PS-MPU-9150A MEMS motion sensor
- L3GD20 MEMS three-axis digital output gyroscope
- HMC5883L three-axis digital magnetometer

=== Command and data management ===
There are two on board computers in LituanicaSAT-1 due to redundancy requirements: the flight computer based on ARM Cortex-M4F microcontroller and secondary (back-up) computer based on an Atmel ATMega2560 microcontroller. The flight computer is the central control unit of the satellite responsible for maintaining the normal operating mode of the satellite, monitoring and control of energy resources, control of attitude determination sub-system and performance of telecommands received from the satellite ground station in Vilnius University, Lithuania. Secondary flight computer is based on Arduino. It ensures limited but safe functionality of the satellite in case of the main CPU failure and will also take and record the first pictures made from space, as well as control the radio beacon of the satellite.

=== Payload ===
The main payload is amateur radio FM mode V/U voice repeater. It operates on 145.950 MHz uplink (PL 67 Hz CTCSS) and 435.180 MHz downlink. The FM repeater subsystem identifies itself with callsign LY5N. The first filter of repeaters receiver is 15 kHz wide, second is 12 kHz. The transmit filter is set to +/- 5 kHz, and bandwidth to 10 kHz, but this width depends highly on the incoming signal width, for example if the uplink signal is 15 kHz wide, it will be cut down with 12 kHz filter. The repeater payload was engineered and developed by Žilvinas Atkočiūnas and Žilvinas Batisa. Due to temperature changes, the downlink frequency may be shifted down by 5 kHz.

=== Power supply subsystem ===
The power supply sub-system includes a GomSpace Nanopower P31u power board with a lithium-ion battery and solar cells.

=== Communications subsystem ===
Comm subsystem consists of AX.25 transceiver and corresponding antennas. He-100 COTS transceiver is used for establishing and maintaining radio communication with the ground station. The key technical specifications of the radio transceiver are as follows:

- Operating frequencies: TX: 437 MHz / RX: 144 MHz
- Sensitivity: -104.7 dBm @ BER 10-3
- Transmit power: 100 mW – 2 W
- Receive power: < 200 mW
- Data transfer rate: 9600 bit/s
- Data protocol: AX.25
- Operating temperature: from -30 to +70 °C

=== Antennas ===
There are 4 monopole antennas on LS-1: three UHF antennas and one VHF antenna. Each antenna is made of approx. 0.2 mm thick and 5 mm wide spring steel measurement tape. In deployed configuration, all UHF antennas are pointed towards the Z+ body axis direction and VHF antenna is pointed toward –Z body axis.

== Mission control ==
The satellite is commanded from Vilnius University amateur radio station, LY1BWB. Ground control software is written in Erlang and has a web interface, served by Yaws. The source code of the software is partly available for public use. Communication is done using custom protocol, which is built on top of reduced set of AX.25 and handles full-duplex data transfer, when required. Recent versions of ground control software support direct upload of binary telemetry files, which were collected and sent to ground control by amateur radio operators worldwide.

== OSCAR status ==
On 8 June 2014, AMSAT-NA OSCAR number administrator Bill Tynan, W3XO, stated that "LituanicaSAT-1 has met all of the requirements for an OSCAR number" and assigned the designation of LO-78 (LituanicaSAT-OSCAR 78) to the satellite. The team of engineers subsequently announced that it will try to keep the onboard FM repeater operative for the rest of the mission.
