= Flock-1 =

Planet Labs' Earth observation satellite constellation

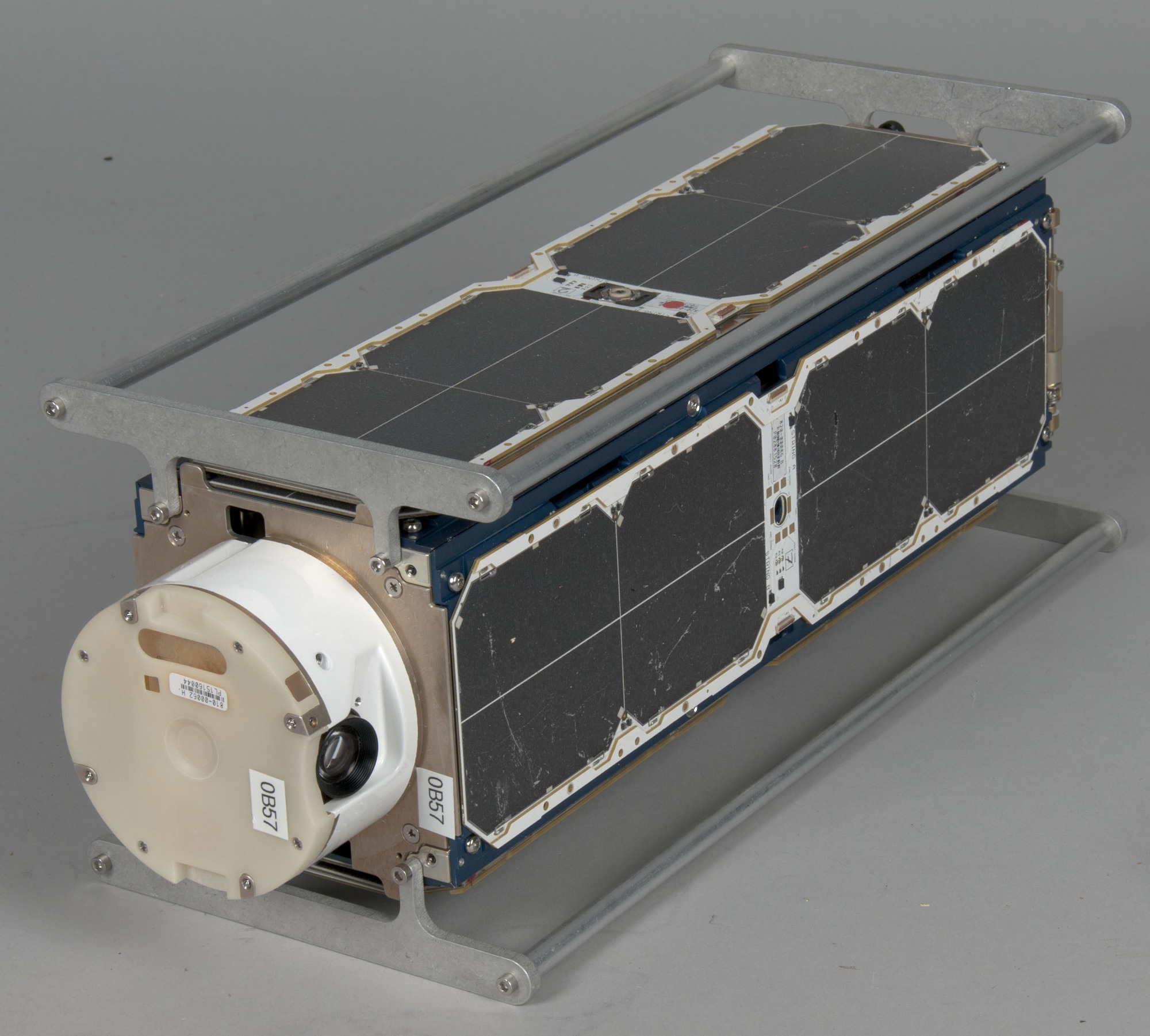
- Mission type: Earth imaging
- Operator: Planet Labs
- Website: www.planet.com/flock1/

Spacecraft properties
- Spacecraft type: CubeSat
- Bus: Dove
- Launch mass: 5 kg (11 lb)
- Dimensions: 10 cm × 10 cm × 30 cm (3.9 in × 3.9 in × 11.8 in) (3U)
- Power: 20 watts

Orbital parameters
- Reference system: Geocentric orbit
- Regime: Low Earth orbit
- Inclination: 51.66°

Flock-1 is a CubeSat satellite constellation launched on 9 January 2014. The satellite is built in a CubeSat bus, and each constellation consists of 28 satellites. All instruments are powered by solar cells mounted on the spacecraft body, along with triple-folded wings, providing approximately 20 watts at maximal power.

== Launch ==
Flock-1 constellation was launched from Mid-Atlantic Regional Spaceport Launch Pad 0, Wallops Island, on 9 January 2014 by an Antares 120 rocket. The satellites were deployed from the International Space Station (ISS) from 11 February 2014 to 28 February 2014.

Another Flock start in January 2015 on a Falcon 9 launch vehicle.

== Mission ==
The satellite is intended for commercial Earth observation service. For this purpose, each satellite is equipped with a camera capable of 3 to 5 m (9.8 to 16.4 ft) ground resolution. Details of intended service by individual satellites were never released publicly and are largely unknown.
