= Cygnus Orb-1 =

Early 2014 cargo mission to the ISS

Orbital-1
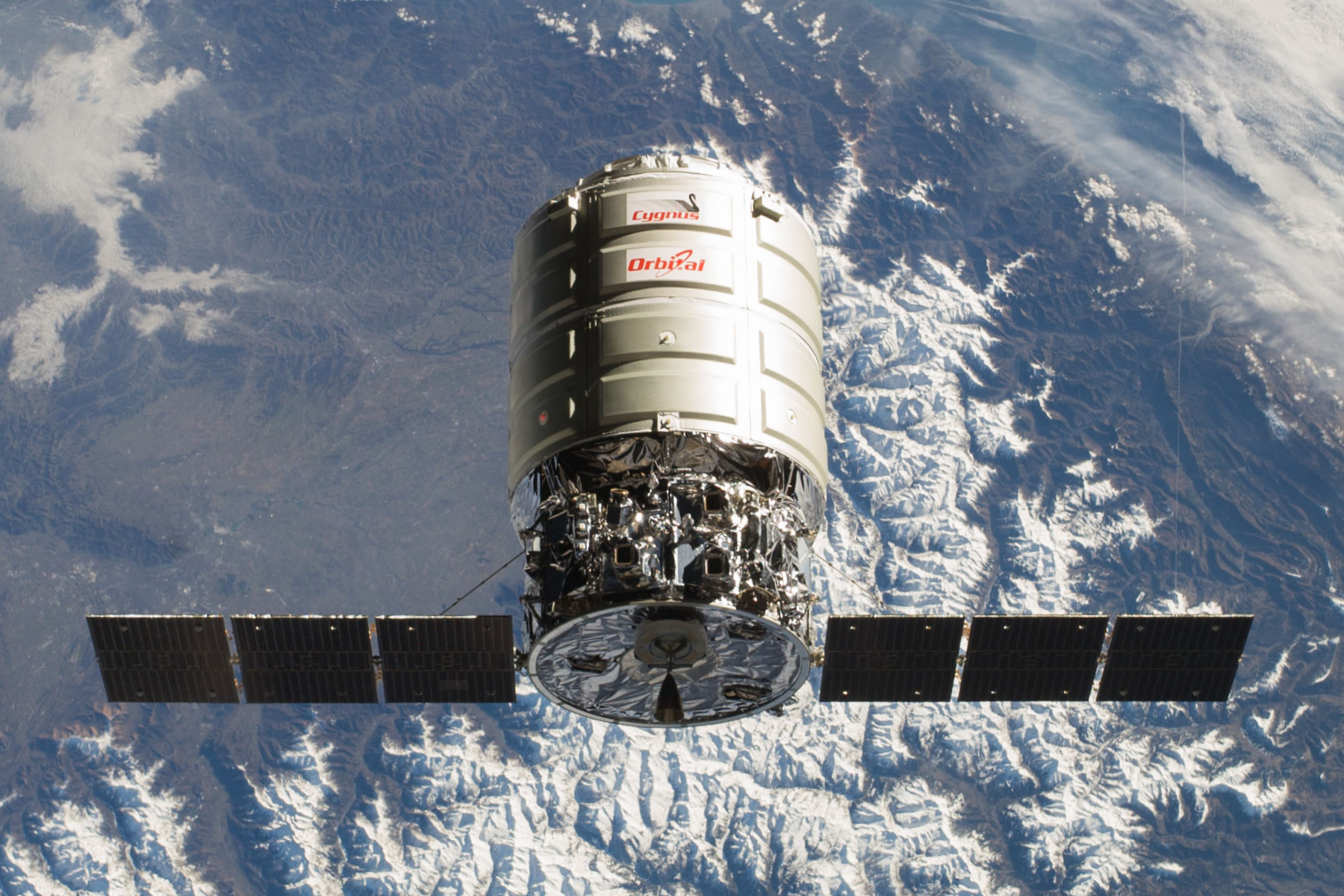
- S.S. C. Gordon Fullerton in free flight.
- Names: CRS Orb-1
- Mission type: ISS resupply
- Operator: Orbital Sciences Corporation
- COSPAR ID: 2014-003A
- SATCAT no.: 39502
- Mission duration: 41 days, 12 minutes

Spacecraft properties
- Spacecraft: S.S. C. Gordon Fullerton
- Spacecraft type: Standard Cygnus
- Manufacturer: Orbital Sciences Corporation; Thales Alenia Space
- Launch mass: 4,923 kg (10,853 lb)
- Payload mass: 1,260 kg (2,780 lb)

Start of mission
- Launch date: 9 January 2014, 18:07:05 UTC
- Rocket: Antares 120
- Launch site: MARS, Pad 0A

End of mission
- Disposal: Deorbited
- Decay date: 19 February 2014, 18:20 UTC

Orbital parameters
- Reference system: Geocentric orbit
- Regime: Low Earth orbit
- Inclination: 51.66°

Berthing at ISS
- Berthing port: Harmony nadir
- RMS capture: 12 January 2014, 11:08 UTC
- Berthing date: 12 January 2014, 13:05 UTC
- Unberthing date: 18 February 2014, 10:25 UTC
- RMS release: 18 February 2014, 11:41 UTC
- Time berthed: 36 days, 21 hours, 20 minutes
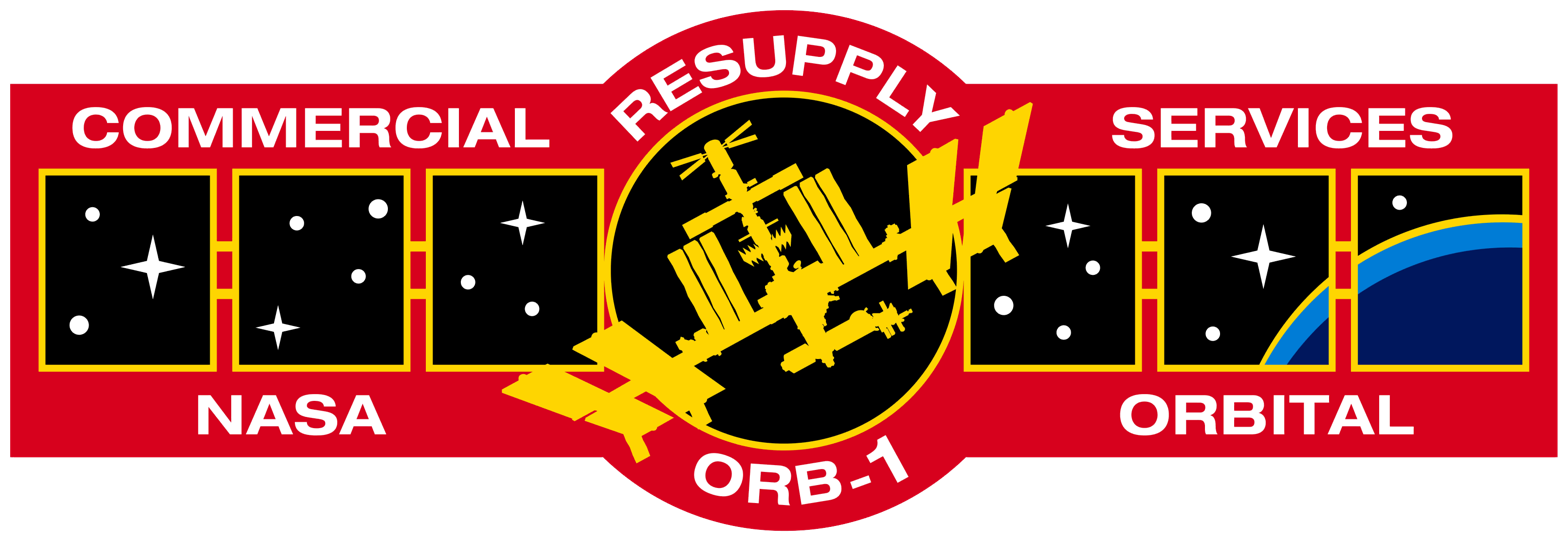
- NASA insignia Commercial Resupply Services Cygnus flights

Orbital-1, also known as Orb-1, was the second flight of the Orbital Sciences Cygnus cargo spacecraft, its second flight to the International Space Station (ISS) and the third launch of the company's Antares launch vehicle. The mission launched on 9 January 2014 at 18:07:05 UTC.

== Spacecraft ==
Orb-1 was the first of eight contracted flights by Orbital Sciences under NASA's Commercial Resupply Services (CRS-1) contract. This was the maiden flight of the Castor 30B second stage. Orbital Sciences continued its naming of Cygnus spacecraft in tribute to former astronauts. This vehicle was named the S.S. C. Gordon Fullerton for C. Gordon Fullerton, the NASA astronaut who died on 21 August 2013. This Cygnus cargo mission launched the Nanoracks CubeSat Deployer to the ISS's Kibō module.

== Launch and early operations ==
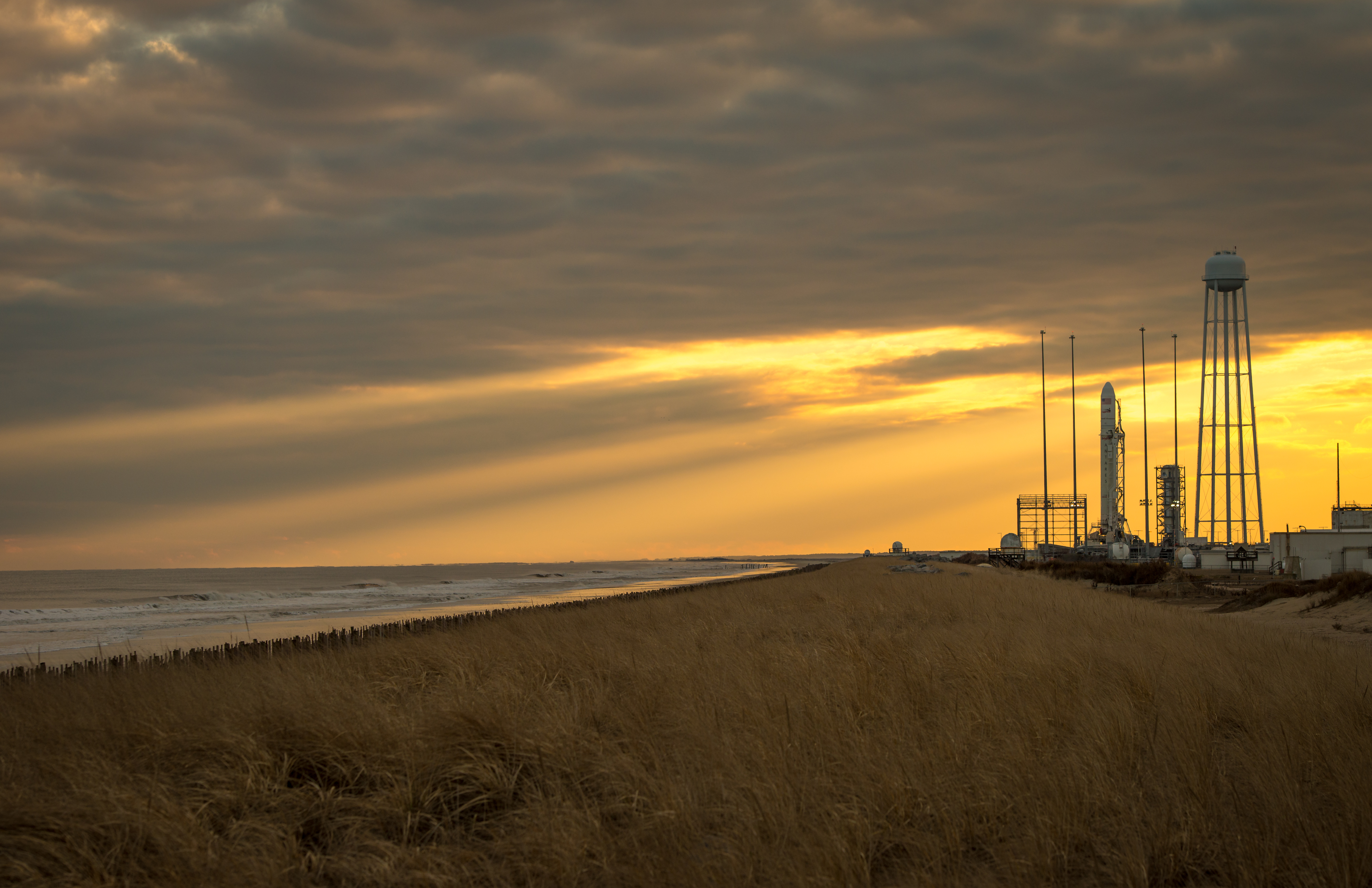
Antares and Cygnus, 6 January 2014

The launch of Orb-1 was scheduled for November 2013, but a series of delays pushed the date to 20 December 2013. The Antares launch vehicle rolled out from the Wallops Horizontal Integration Facility (HIF) on the morning of 17 December 2013, and was later erected at Launch Pad 0A. Later that day, due to the need for a series of spacewalks to fix a faulty coolant system on the International Space Station, NASA directed Orbital Sciences to stand down the Antares rocket. Antares was rolled back to the HIF and time-sensitive cargo removed. The launch date was rescheduled for no earlier than 13 January 2014, but was later moved forward to 7 January 2014 after a scheduling conflict at Wallops was resolved. The launch was delayed one day due to cold temperatures at the launch site.

NASA Wallops and Orbital Sciences announced the launch attempt on 8 January 2014 was scrubbed due to "an unusually high level of space radiation that exceeded by a considerable margin the constraints imposed on the mission to ensure the rocket's electronic systems are not impacted by a harsh radiation environment". Orbital later revised this, stating that a more extensive review of the radiation environment found it to be "within acceptable limits" of the Antares program, and that a launch would be attempted on 9 January 2014.

The Orb-1 mission successfully launched on 9 January 2014 at 18:07:05 UTC from the Mid-Atlantic Regional Spaceport Launch Pad 0A. Solar array deployment occurred shortly after arriving in orbit. The Cygnus spacecraft arrived at the International Space Station early on 12 January 2014.

The launch was expected to be viewable from South Carolina through Massachusetts and as far west as West Virginia. As with its last couple of launches out of Wallops, Orbital Sciences released viewing information for the Eastern United States, including maps indicating launch vehicle maximum elevation above horizon and time of first sighting after launch for the various viewing locations.

Attempt	Planned	Result	Turnaround	Reason	Decision point	Weather go (%)	Notes
1	20 Dec 2013, 12:00:00 pm	Delayed	—	Technical	17 Dec 2013, 12:00 pm		ISS coolant loop repair spacewalks forced delay.
2	7 Jan 2014, 1:55:00 pm	Delayed	18 days 1 hour 55 minutes	Weather	3 Jan 2014, 12:00 pm		Delayed due to extreme cold temperatures.
3	8 Jan 2014, 1:32:00 pm	Scrubbed	0 days 23 hours 37 minutes	Space weather	8 Jan 2014, 8:00 am	95%	Scrubbed for concerns about avionics health due to recent solar flux activity.
4	9 Jan 2014, 1:07:05 pm	Success	0 days 23 hours 35 minutes				Successful launch.

== Payload ==
Cygnus was filled with 1,260 kg (2,780 lb) of supplies for the ISS, including science experiments and hardware to expand the research capability of the station, crew provisions and spare parts. This included 12 experiments flying as part of the Student Spaceflight Experiments Program (SSEP), selected from 1,466 entrants and involving 7,200 North American students. Types of cargo include:

- Crew supplies: 424 kg (935 lb)
- Hardware: 333 kg (734 lb)
- Science and research: 434 kg (957 lb)
- Computer supplies: 48 kg (106 lb)
- Spacewalk tools: 22 kg (49 lb)

Some of the major experiments focus on:

- NASA's Launch Services Program SPHERES-Slosh Experiment for the SPHERES testbed
- Vaccines, antibiotic effectiveness, and drug resistance in space
- Physics research which may lead to better products on Earth
- Fire and liquid behavior in space
- Ant behavior in space
- Nanoracks CubeSat Deployer.

Cygnus also contained 33 cubesat, making the total number of spacecraft aboard the Antares up to 34, including the Cygnus itself.

== End of mission ==
Canadarm2 unberthed the Cygnus spacecraft from the nadir port of the Harmony module on 18 February 2014 at 10:25 UTC. The spacecraft was then maneuvered to a position below the station, where it was released from the Canadarm2 at 11:41 UTC. It then performed a series of separation maneuvers to move it away from the station. The spacecraft reentered the atmosphere and burned up on 19 February 2014 over the southern Pacific Ocean, disposing of approximately 1,470 kg (3,240 lb) of trash.

== Gallery ==
Cygnus Orb-1
Cygnus mated to Antares

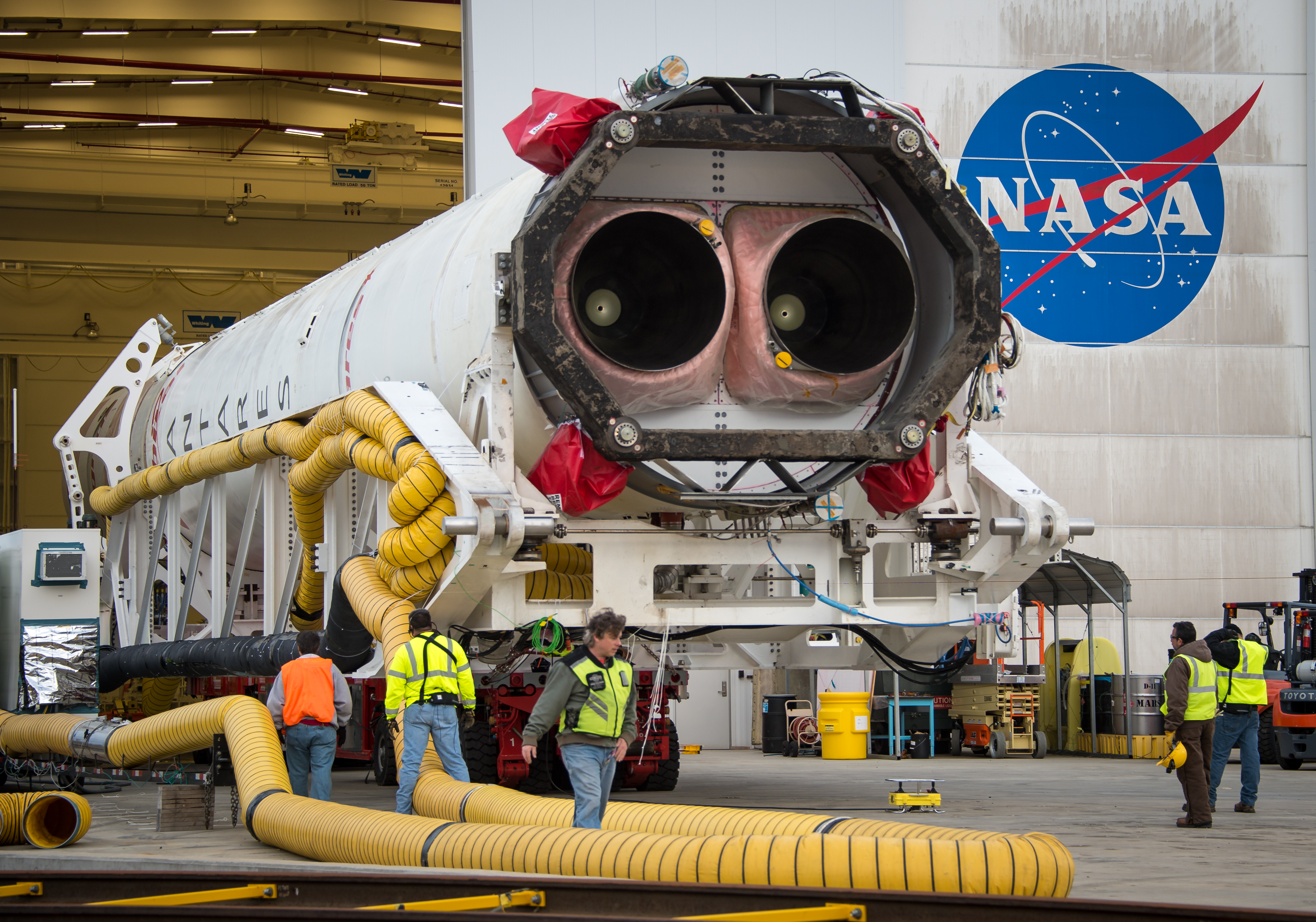
Orb-1 rolling to the pad

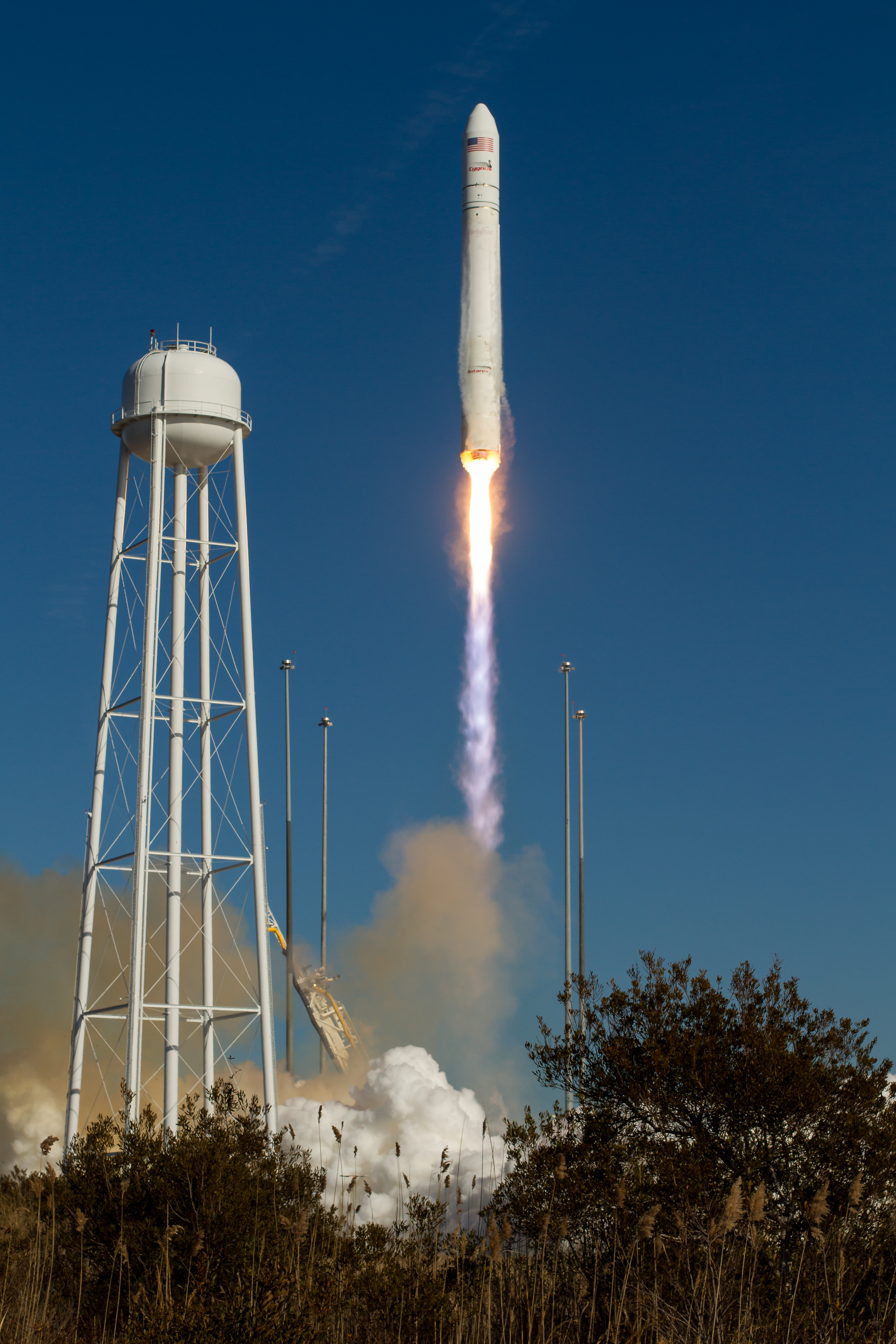
Launch of Orb-1

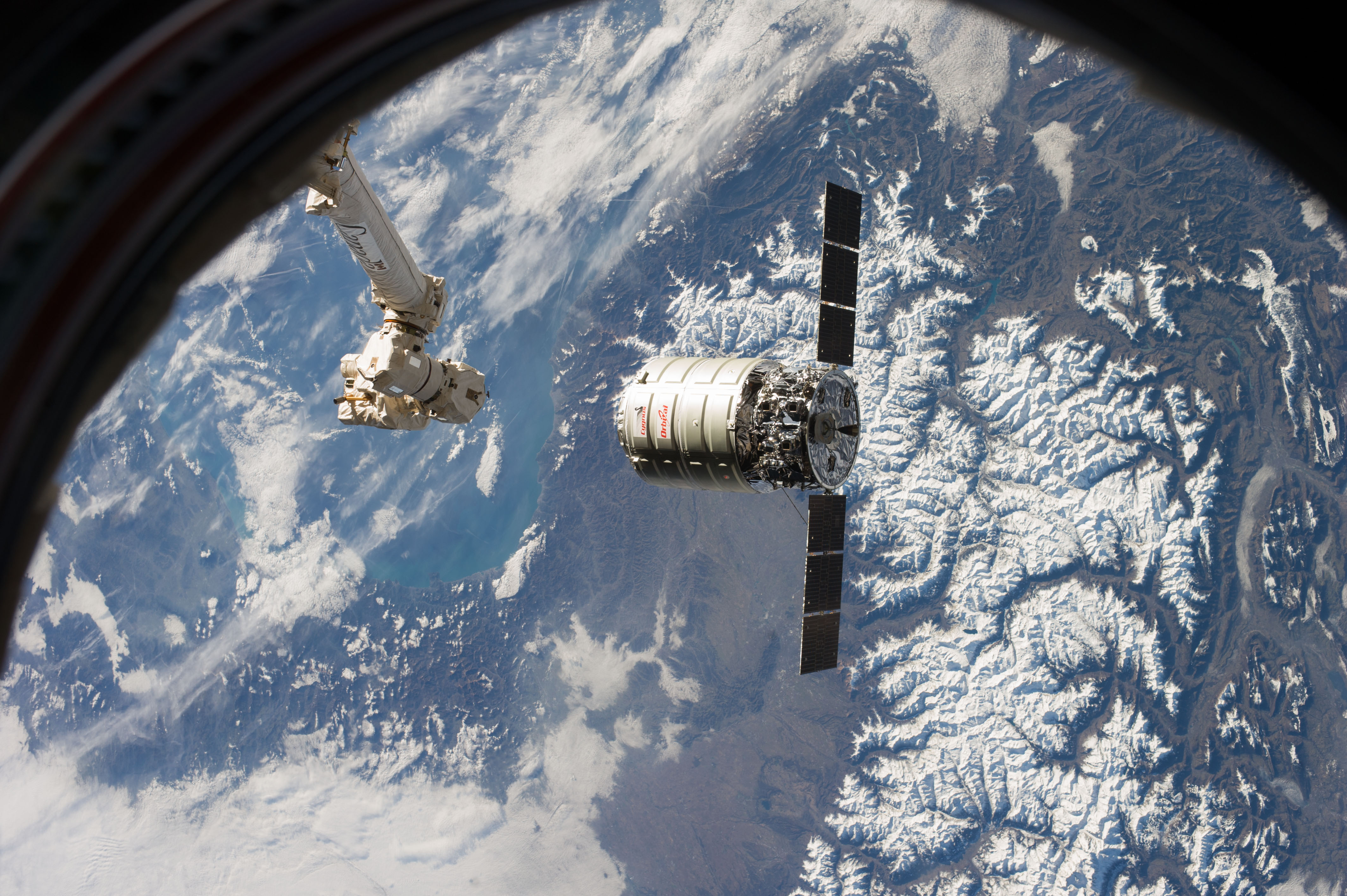
Cygnus approaches the ISS

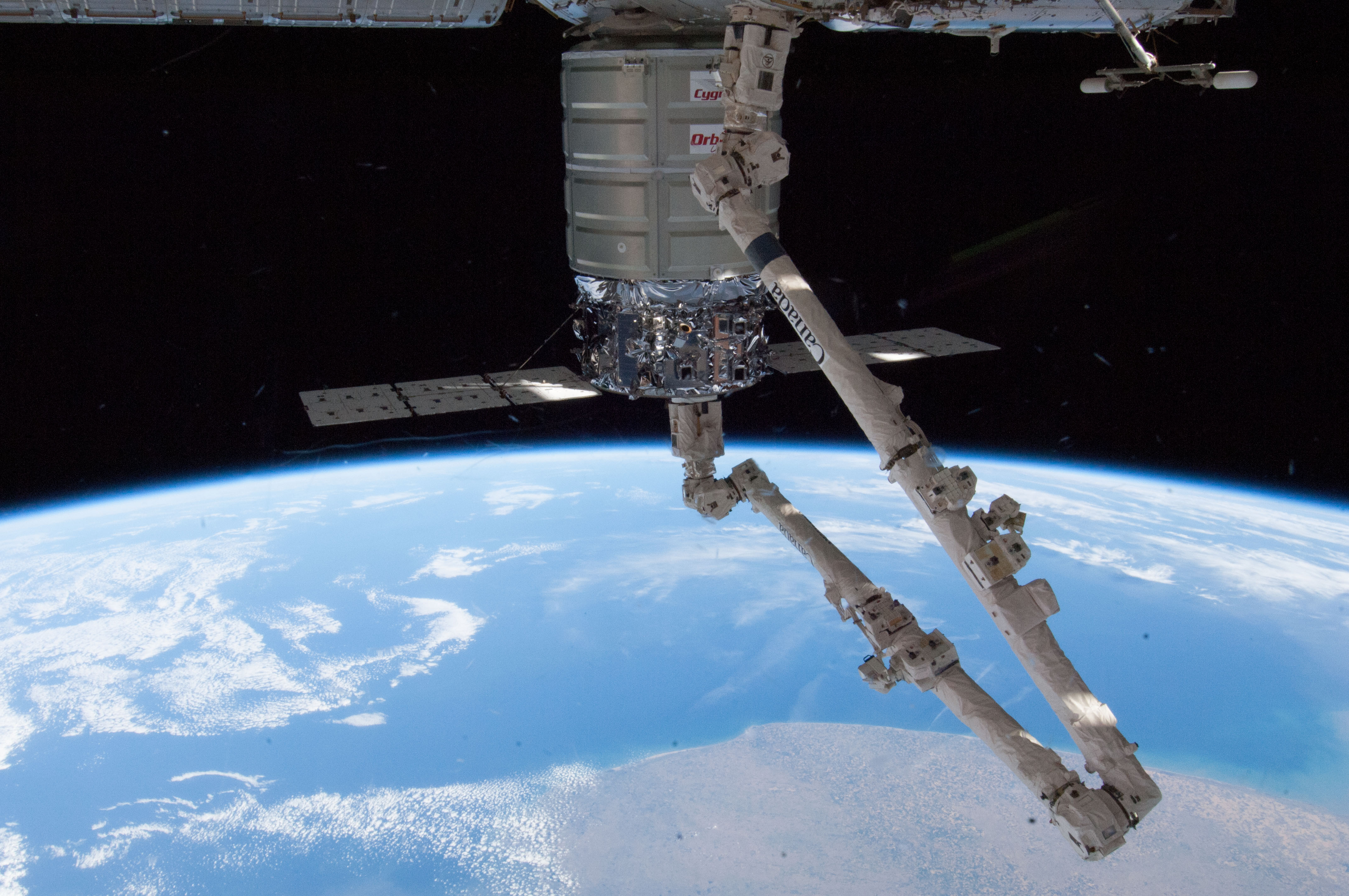
Cygnus docked to the ISS

== See also ==
- Uncrewed spaceflights to the International Space Station
