= GhanaSat-1 =

First ghanaian spacecraft

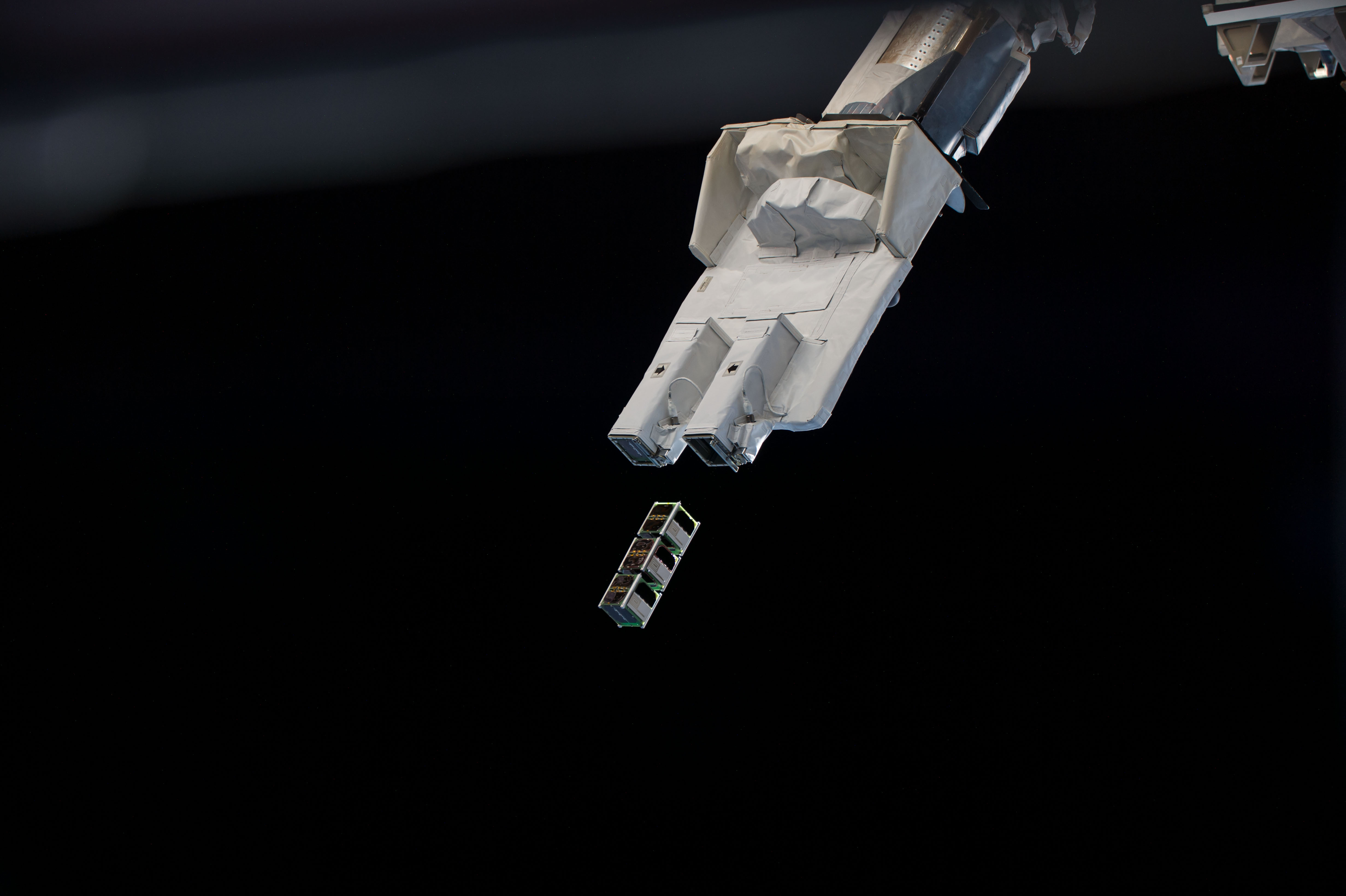
- GhanaSat-1 in the middle of three other deploying CubeSats in Birds-1 mission
- Names: Bird GG; ANUSAT-1
- Mission type: Technology demonstration Earth observation
- Operator: All Nations University
- COSPAR ID: 1998-067MV
- SATCAT no.: 42821
- Mission duration: 24 months (planned); 22 months, 14 days (achieved)

Spacecraft properties
- Spacecraft type: 1U CubeSat
- Manufacturer: All Nations University
- Launch mass: 1 kg
- Dimensions: 10 x 10 x 10 cm

Start of mission
- Launch date: 3 June 2017, 21:07:38 UTC
- Rocket: Falcon 9 FT, CRS-11
- Launch site: Kennedy, LC-39A
- Contractor: SpaceX
- Deployed from: Nanoracks CubeSat Deployer
- Deployment date: 7 July 2017, 08:51 UTC

End of mission
- Disposal: Deorbited
- Decay date: 22 May 2019

Orbital parameters
- Reference system: Geocentric orbit
- Regime: Low Earth orbit
- Perigee altitude: 397.8 km
- Apogee altitude: 403.6 km
- Inclination: 51.64°
- Period: 92.57 minutes
- Joint Global Multi-Nation Birds Satellite

GhanaSat-1 was the first nanosatellite of Ghana to be launched into space. It was designed and built in two years in conjunction with the Kyushu Institute of Technology through the Birds-1 program, which had the goal of helping countries build their first satellite.

The satellite took images, collected atmospheric data, measured space radiation, and transmitted uploaded audio. GhanaSat-1 was launched to the International Space Station (ISS) on a Falcon 9 rocket. It was released into space from the Nanoracks CubeSat Deployer on the ISS on 7 July 2017 and was used to monitor environmental activities along Ghana's coastline. The satellite deorbited on 22 May 2019.

== Background ==
GhanaSat-1 was developed by engineers Benjamin Bonsu, Ernest Matey, and Joseph Quansah at All Nations University in Ghana. The Ghana team joined the Joint Global Multi-Nation Birds satellite program, supported by Kyushu Institute of Technology (KIT) of Japan, which is a cross-border interdisciplinary satellite project for non-spacefaring countries. The Birds-1 Project included four guest countries: Ghana, Mongolia, Nigeria, and Bangladesh. GhanaSat-1 is Ghana's first satellite launched into orbit, entirely funded by All Nations University. This achievement makes All Nations University Africa's first private university to launch a satellite into orbit.

== Design and development ==
The two-year period spanning the development, construction, launch, and operation of the Bird-1 satellites engaged three university students from each of the five participating countries. The five 1U CubeSats, four built by the guest countries and one by Kyushu Institute of Technology (Japan), were all identical in design. The satellite cost about US$500,000 to manufacture and launch.

GhanaSat-1 was a nanosatellite, weighing around 1 kilogram (2.2 lb). Power was generated by solar cells and stored in batteries. The satellite was cube-shaped and measured 10 centimetres (3.9 in) on each side. The satellite carried low- and high-resolution cameras that took pictures of Ghana and monitored the country's coastline. The satellite had the ability to receive requested songs from the ground and transmit them from space; the national anthem of Ghana was one of the songs broadcast in orbit. The satellite also measured the effects of radiation in space on commercial microprocessors.

GhanaSat-1 was given to the Japan Aerospace Exploration Agency (JAXA) on 9 February 2017, and was then transferred to the National Aeronautics and Space Administration (NASA) on 12 February 2017. The GhanaSat-1 Birds designation is Bird GG.

== Mission ==
=== Launch ===
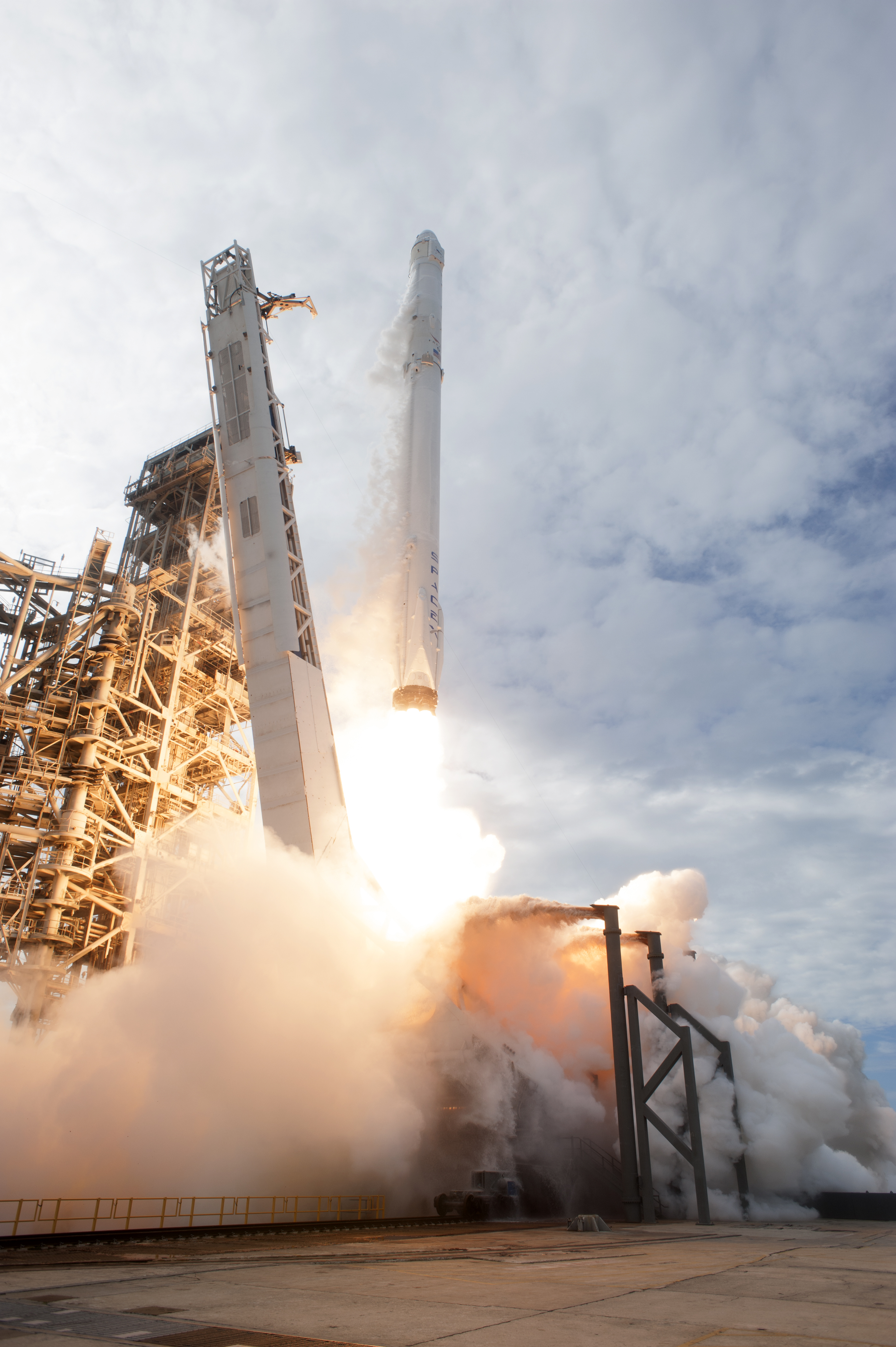
SpaceX launch of CRS-11 with GhanaSat-1 onboard.

SpaceX launched the satellite on its CRS-11 mission to the International Space Station on 3 June 2017. The satellite was carried in a Dragon spacecraft on a Falcon 9 rocket, launched from NASA's Kennedy Space Center, LC-39A. This was the 100th launch from LC-39A and the first time SpaceX reused one of its Dragon capsules. This mission also carried CubeSats from Japan, Bangladesh, Nigeria, and Mongolia. The satellites from Bangladesh (BRAC Onnesha) and Mongolia (Mazaalai) are those countries' first satellites.

GhanaSat-1 was released by a Japanese astronaut from the Nanoracks CubeSat Deployer, located in the Japanese Kibō module of the International Space Station, on 7 July 2017. The satellite launch was broadcast live and watched by over 400 people at All Nations University. The satellite orbited the Earth at an altitude of 400 kilometres (250 mi) and at an inclination of 51.64°, completing an orbit around the planet every 92.57 minutes at a velocity of 7.67 kilometres per second (4.77 mi/s).

=== Operations ===
The satellite was primarily a technology demonstrator and Earth observation satellite. The Ghanaian scientists took images of the Ghanaian coastline for cartography. The acting director of Space Systems Technology Laboratory at All Nations University, Richard Damoah, said the satellite would "...also help us train the upcoming generation on how to apply satellites in different activities around our region. For instance, monitoring illegal mining is one of the things we are looking to accomplish". The satellite communicated with seven ground stations: one in each of the countries participating in the Birds-1 program, and one each in Thailand and Taiwan. The satellite was the last of the Birds-1 group to deorbit, ending its mission 22 May 2019.

== Future work ==
The university plans to coordinate with the government to build GhanaSat-2 and GhanaSat-3. The primary objective of GhanaSat-2 is to monitor water pollution, illegal mining, and deforestation. Japan's work with non-spacefaring countries continues with the Philippines, Bhutan, and Malaysia through Birds-2, launched in 2018 along with SpaceX CRS-15.
