= Nigeria EduSat-1 =

Nigerian CubeSat

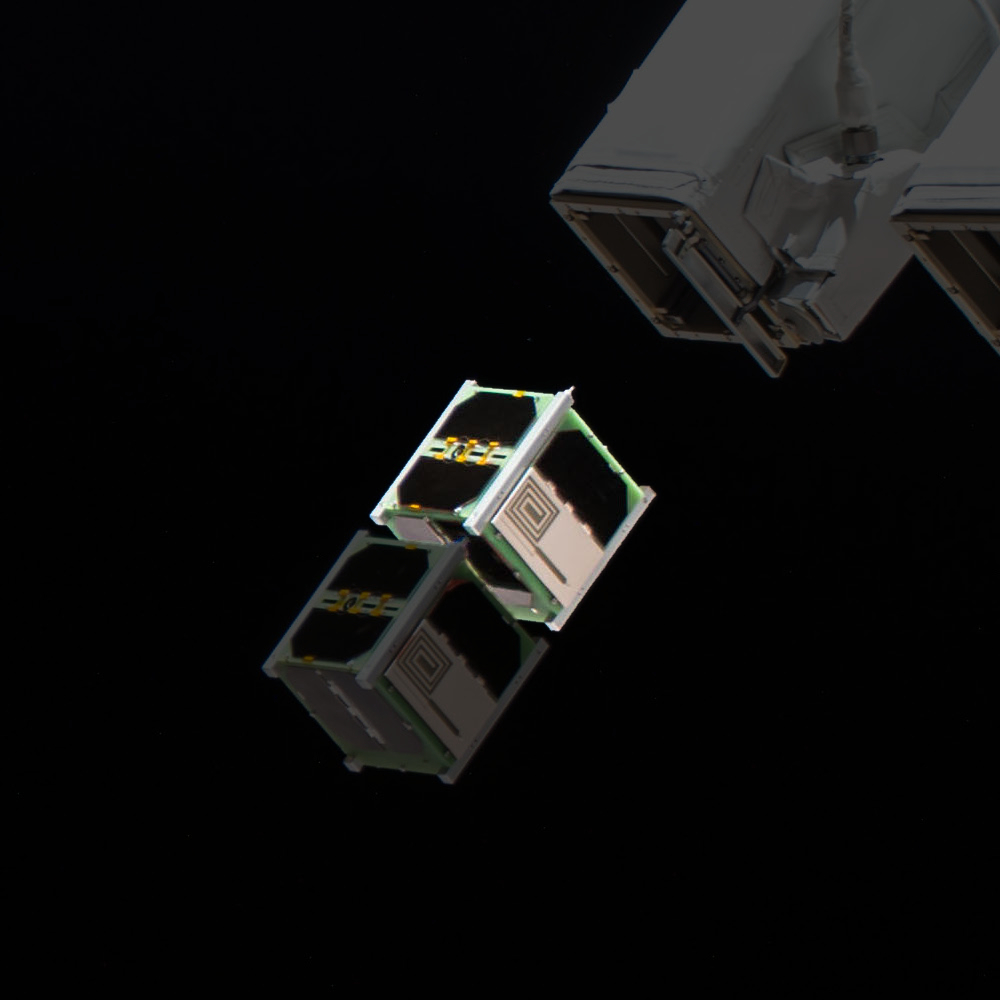
- Nigeria EduSat-1 at deployment
- Names: Bird NN
- Mission type: Technology demonstration Earth observation
- Operator: Federal University of Technology Akure
- COSPAR ID: 1998-067MY
- SATCAT no.: 42824
- Mission duration: 24 months (planned); 22 months, 5 days (achieved)

Spacecraft properties
- Spacecraft type: 1U CubeSat
- Manufacturer: Federal University of Technology Akure
- Launch mass: 1 kg
- Dimensions: 10 × 10 × 10 cm
- Power: watts

Start of mission
- Launch date: 3 June 2017, 21:07:38 UTC
- Rocket: Falcon 9 FT, CRS-11
- Launch site: Kennedy, LC-39A
- Contractor: SpaceX
- Deployed from: Nanoracks CubeSat Deployer
- Deployment date: 7 July 2017, 08:51 UTC

End of mission
- Disposal: Deorbited
- Decay date: 13 May 2019

Orbital parameters
- Reference system: Geocentric orbit
- Regime: Low Earth orbit
- Perigee altitude: 395.6 km
- Apogee altitude: 405.9 km
- Inclination: 51.64°
- Period: 92.57 minutes

Nigeria EduSat-1 was a Nigerian nanosatellite built by the Federal University of Technology Akure (FUTA), created in conjunction with the Japanese Birds-1 program. It was Nigeria's first satellite built by a university. It was launched from the Japanese Kibō module of the International Space Station, being brought to the station as part of SpaceX CRS-11.

The satellite deorbited on 13 May 2019, nearly two years after launch.

== Background ==
Japan supports non-spacefaring countries in their efforts to build their first satellites through a program called the Joint Global Multi-Nation Birds Satellite project (Birds). Five countries constructed satellites in the Birds-1 program: Bangladesh, Ghana, Japan, Mongolia, and Nigeria. Together, the five satellites make up the Birds-1 fleet. Nigeria EduSat-1 is the first satellite built by a Nigerian university.

The project was supported by Kyushu Institute of Technology (KIT) as part of the Joint Global Multi-Nation Birds Satellite project, which is a cross-border interdisciplinary satellite project for non-spacefaring countries supported by Japan. The university also partnered with the National Space Research and Development Agency (NASRDA), Abuja, Nigeria. The five satellites built by the five countries were all identical in their design.

Nigeria has a history with satellites in space. NigeriaSat-1, NigeriaSat-2, NigeriaSat-X, NigComSat-1, and NigComSat-1R were ordered by the Nigerian government, but were not built by Nigeria.

== Development ==
The satellite was designed, built, and owned by the Federal University of Technology Akure (FUTA), in conjunction with Nigeria's National Space Research and Development Agency and Japan's Kyushu Institute of Technology. It was equipped with 0.3−megapixel and 5−megapixel cameras, and with the rest of the satellite fleet, took images of Nigeria. The satellite transmitted songs and poems as an outreach project to generate Nigerian interest in science. The signal could be received by amateur radio operators. The satellite constellation also conducted measurements of the atmospheric density 400 kilometres (250 mi) above the Earth. The satellite cost about US$500,000 to manufacture and launch.

== Mission ==
=== Launch ===
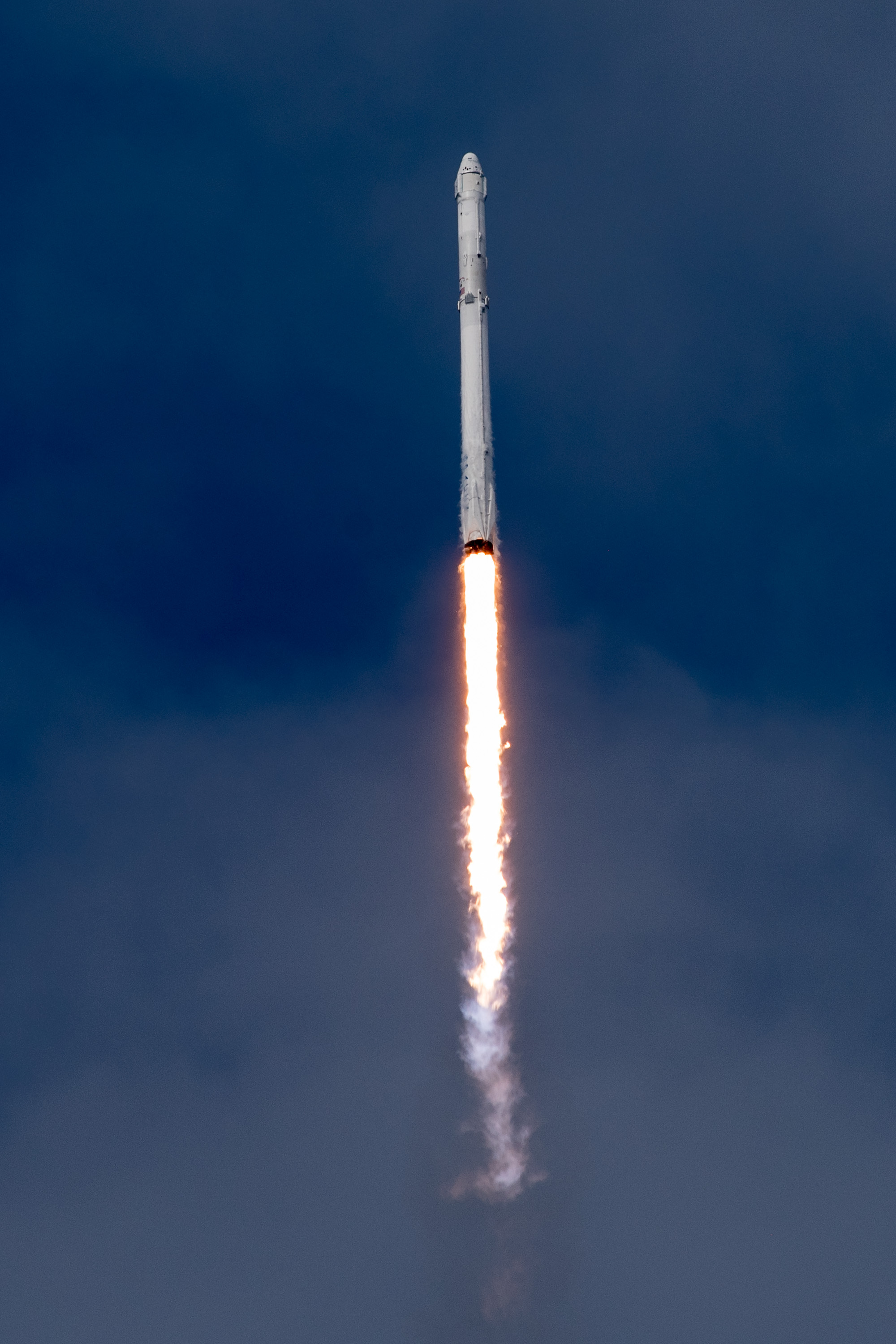
SpaceX launch of CRS-11 with Nigeria EduSat-1 onboard.

The launch was planned for 1 June 2017, but was postponed due to poor weather conditions. SpaceX launched the satellite on its CRS-11 mission to the International Space Station on 3 June 2017. The satellite was carried in a Dragon spacecraft on a Falcon 9 rocket, launched from NASA's Kennedy Space Center, LC-39A. This was the 100th launch from LC-39A and the first time SpaceX reused one of its Dragon capsules.

The satellite orbited the Earth at an altitude of 400 kilometres (250 mi) and at an inclination of 51.64°. The satellite traveled around the Earth every 92.57 minutes at a velocity of 7.67 kilometres per second (4.77 mi/s).

=== Operations ===
The satellite communicated with seven ground stations: one in each of the countries participating in the Birds-1 program, and one each in Thailand and Taiwan. The primary objective was for the satellite to be a technology demonstrator and to familiarize Nigerian students and scientists with satellite technology and manufacturing techniques.

The Birds-1 satellites decayed in May 2019. Nigeria EduSat-1 was the second-to-last to decay, ending its mission on 13 May 2019.
