= Adepoju =

- Gender: Male
- Language: Yoruba

Origin
- Origin: Nigerian
- Region of origin: South -West Nigeria

Adépọ̀jù is a surname of Yoruba origin, meaning "the crown or royalty has become much". It also means that you are a king of many kingdoms.

Notable people with the surname include:

- Mutiu Adepoju (born 1970), Nigerian footballer
- Mathew Olumide Adepoju (born 1971), Nigerian Space Scientist and Director General, National Space Research and Development Agency.
- Sikiru Adepoju (born 1950), Nigerian percussionist and recording artist
