= Mazaalai (satellite) =

First Mongolian spacecraft

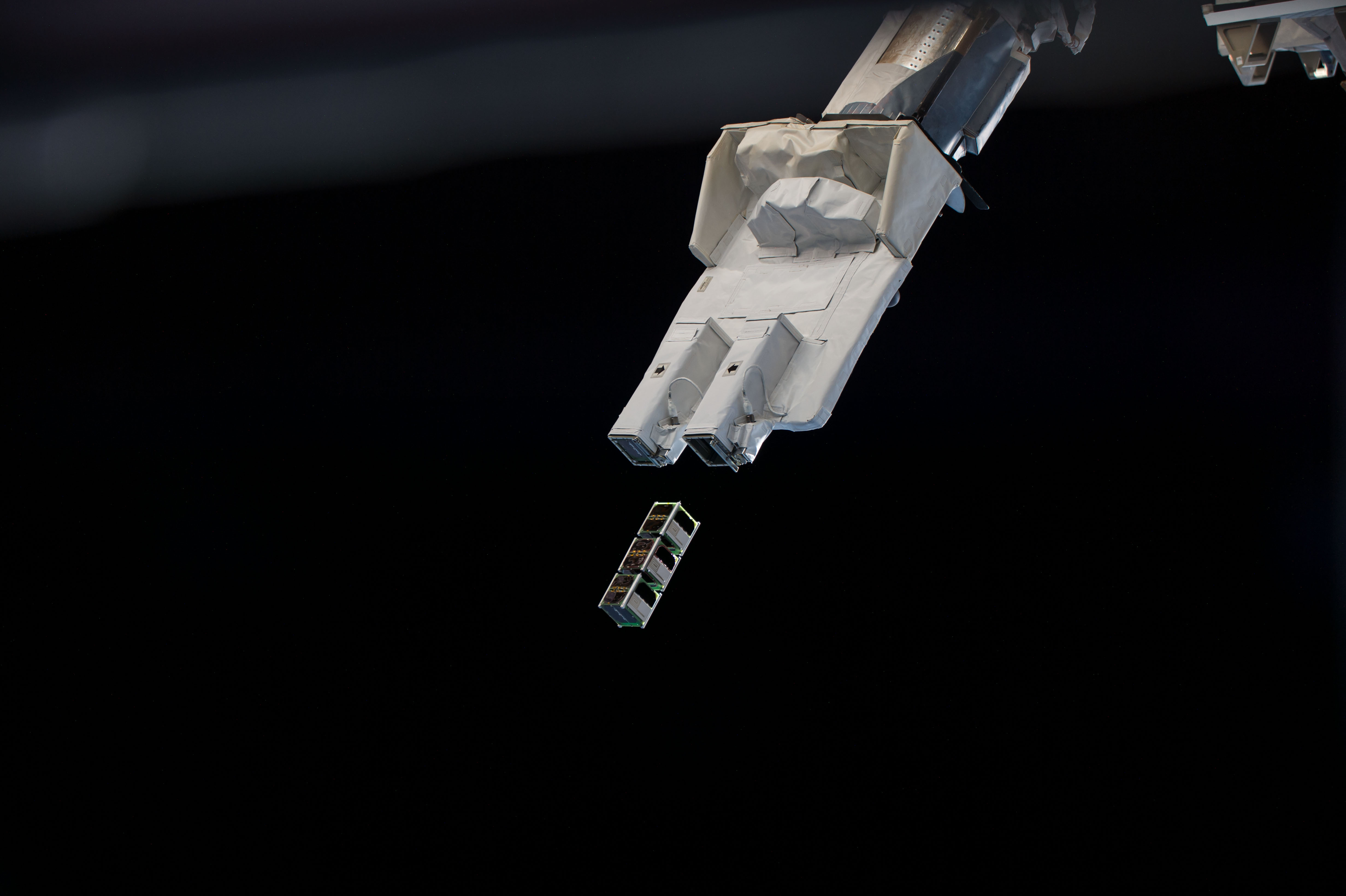
- Mazaalai among three other deploying CubeSat in Birds-1 mission, the top-most of the batch.
- Names: Bird MM; NUMSAT-1
- Mission type: Technology demonstration Earth observation
- Operator: National University of Mongolia
- COSPAR ID: 1998-067MW
- SATCAT no.: 42822
- Mission duration: 24 months (planned); 22 months, 3 days (achieved)

Spacecraft properties
- Spacecraft type: 1U CubeSat
- Manufacturer: National University of Mongolia
- Launch mass: 1 kg
- Dimensions: 10 x 10 x 10 cm
- Power: watts

Start of mission
- Launch date: 3 June 2017, 21:07:38 UTC
- Rocket: Falcon 9 FT, CRS-11
- Launch site: Kennedy, LC-39A
- Contractor: SpaceX
- Deployed from: Nanoracks CubeSat Deployer
- Deployment date: 7 July 2017, 08:51 UTC

End of mission
- Disposal: Deorbited
- Decay date: 11 May 2019

Orbital parameters
- Reference system: Geocentric orbit
- Regime: Low Earth orbit
- Perigee altitude: 397.8 km
- Apogee altitude: 403.7 km
- Inclination: 51.64°
- Period: 92.57 minutes

Mazaalai (Mongolian: Мазаалай; IPA: [madz͡aːɮai]) was a Mongolian nanosatellite CubeSat that was launched into space on 3 June 2017 as part of the SpaceX CRS-11 mission.

Released into space from the Nanoracks CubeSat Deployer on the Kibō module of the International Space Station on 7 July 2017, Mazaalai was the first Mongolian satellite in space. It had imaging capabilities and could transmit songs back to Earth, but its primary mission involved performing experiments including GPS location, air density measurement, and investigation of cosmic radiation. The mission ended when the satellite deorbited 11 May 2019.

== Background ==
Mazaalai was part of the Birds-1 constellation of satellites, built through the Joint Global Multi-Nation Birds Satellite at Japan's Kyushu Institute of Technology (KIT), a program intended to help universities in non-spacefaring countries get satellites into space. The Birds-1 constellation also included satellites from Japan, Ghana, Nigeria, and Bangladesh. Over a two-year period, three university students from each of the five participating countries learned skills to build, develop, launch and operate the satellites. All five satellites were identical to each other. The satellites from Ghana (GhanaSat-1) and Bangladesh (BRAC Onnesha) were the first satellites in space for those countries.

MongolSat-1, which was launched in early 2017, is sometimes reported as Mongolia's first satellite, but that satellite was in fact launched by a Bermuda-based company, ABS. It was manufactured by the United States company Boeing and was co-branded as MongolSat-1 after launch.

== Design ==
Mazaalai was named after the endangered Gobi bear, native to Mongolia. It was designed and built by three young researchers of the National University of Mongolia, in collaboration with students from Ghana, Japan, Bangladesh, and Nigeria.

The spacecraft was a CubeSat 1U with a mass of approximately 1 kilogram (2.2 lb). It was equipped with 0.3 megapixel and 5 megapixel cameras, capable of taking images with 100 metres (330 ft) resolution, and had sensors capable of measuring air density and space radiation. The satellite could also transmit songs and data at 437 MHz to Earth that had been uploaded to the satellite.

== Mission ==
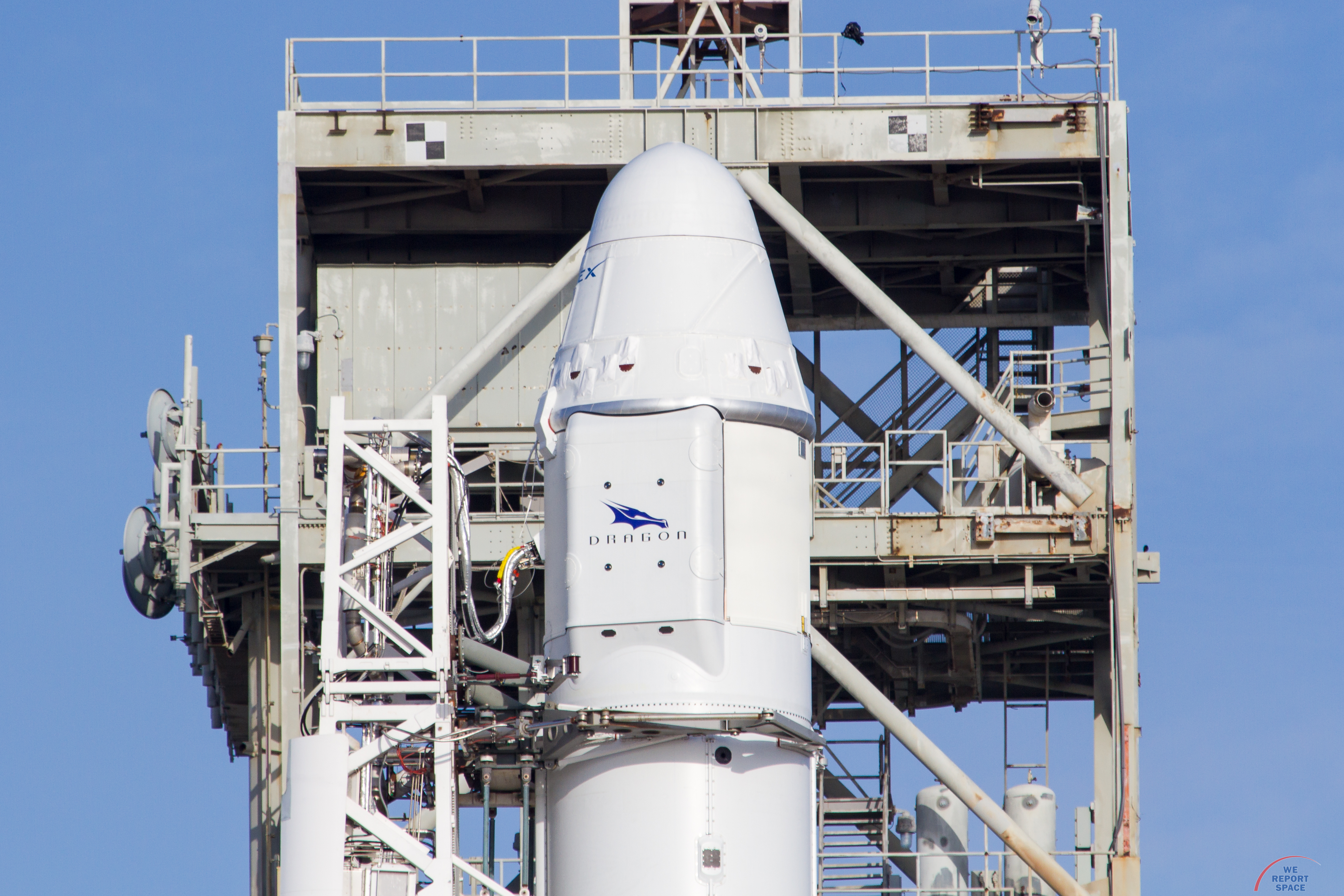
Dragon capsule, containing Mazaalai, mounted on Falcon 9 rocket.

=== Launch ===
Mazaalai was sent to the International Space Station on 3 June 2017 as part of the SpaceX CRS-11 mission. The satellite was carried in a Dragon spacecraft on a Falcon 9 rocket, launched from NASA's Kennedy Space Center, LC-39A. This was the 100th launch from LC-39A and the first time SpaceX reused one of its Dragon capsules. The satellite was released into orbit from the Japanese Kibō module of the ISS on 7 July 2017. The satellite orbited the Earth at an altitude of approximately 400 kilometres (250 mi) and at an inclination of 51.64°, completing an orbit every 92.57 minutes at a velocity of 7.67 kilometres per second (4.77 mi/s).

=== Operations ===
The satellite performed experiments including GPS location, air density measurements, and investigating cosmic radiation. The satellite transmitted the national anthem of Mongolia to Earth. The main purpose of the project for Mongolia was to develop more accurate maps, help mitigate natural disasters, and conduct independent space studies. The project was supported by Mongolian Emergency Organization of Government and National University of Mongolia as part of the Joint Global Multi-Nation Birds Satellite project of Kyushu Institute of Technology (KIT), an international interdisciplinary project for non-space faring countries supported by Japan. The satellite communicated with seven ground stations: one in each of the countries participating in the Birds-1 program, and one each in Thailand and Taiwan.

The satellite deorbited on 11 May 2019.

== Future work ==
A second satellite launch in 2018 was planned by the Mazaalai team members. Japan's work with non-spacefaring countries continues with the Philippines, Bhutan, and Malaysia through Birds-2, launched on 29 June 2018 along with SpaceX CRS-15.
