= Birds-1 =

Multinational space satellite program

Birds project logo

Birds-1 was the first iteration of a multinational program called the Joint Global Multi-Nations Birds Satellite project, or Birds project, to help countries build their first satellite. The Japanese Kyushu Institute of Technology (KIT) supported the design and fabrication of the satellites. The constellation was launched by a Falcon 9 rocket to the International Space Station on 3 June 2017, as part of CRS-11, where it was released from the Kibō module into space. Japan, Ghana, Mongolia, Nigeria, and Bangladesh participated in the Birds-1 program, all building identical satellites for the constellation.

All of the Birds-1 satellites were deorbited in May 2019.

== Background ==
The Kyushu Institute of Technology (KIT) in Japan supports non-spacefaring countries to build their first satellite through a program called The Joint Global Multi-Nation Birds Satellite project (BIRDS). Five countries participated in the first Bird program: Japan, Ghana, Mongolia, Nigeria, and Bangladesh. The Birds project logo was designed by Ghanaian student Ernest Teye Matey.

The Nigerian government had a background with satellites but had never built one before Birds-1. Sometimes Mazaalai was referred to as Mongolia's first satellite, but it was launched by Bermuda-based company ABS and built by U.S. company Boeing. It was co-branded as MongolSat-1 after launch. Birds-1 successfully launched the first satellite for Bangladesh, Ghana, Mongolia, and Nigeria.

== Development and design ==
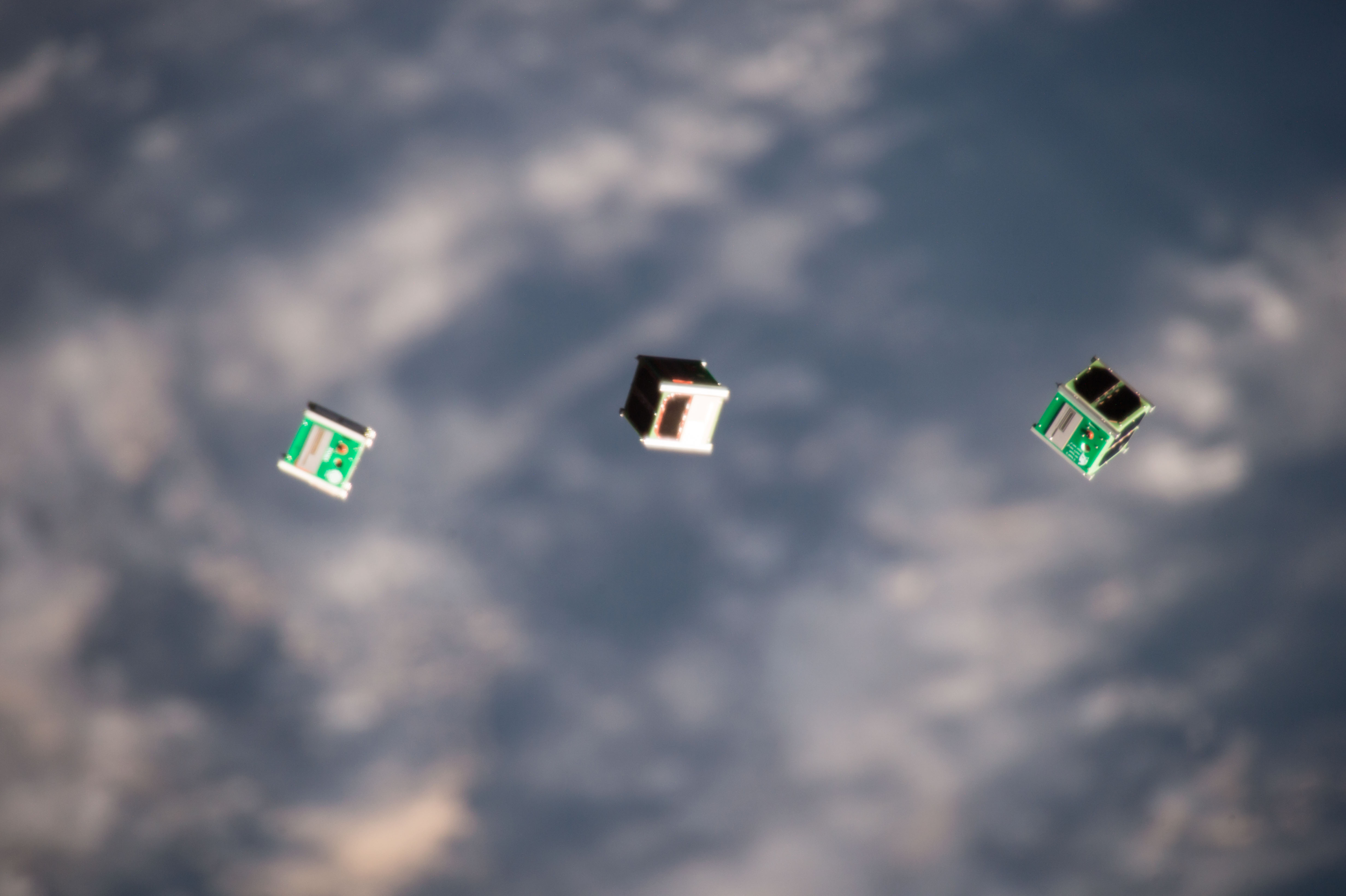
Three out of five Birds-1 satellites in orbit

Five countries built identical satellites: Bangladesh (BRAC Onnesha), Japan (Toki), Mongolia (Mazaalai), Ghana (GhanaSat-1), and Nigeria (Nigeria EduSat-1). Each satellite cost about US$500,000 to manufacture and launch. The satellites were 10 centimetres (3.9 in) cubes in the 1U CubeSat class, weighing around 1 kilogram (2.2 lb) each. Power was generated from solar cells and stored in batteries. They carried 0.3 megapixel and 5 megapixel cameras to image the Earth. The constellation could also transmit music and other sounds back to Earth. The satellites also contained provisions to measure the effects of solar radiation on commercial microprocessors and could measure air density. The satellites were expected to remain in orbit for 1.1 years.

== Mission ==
=== Launch ===
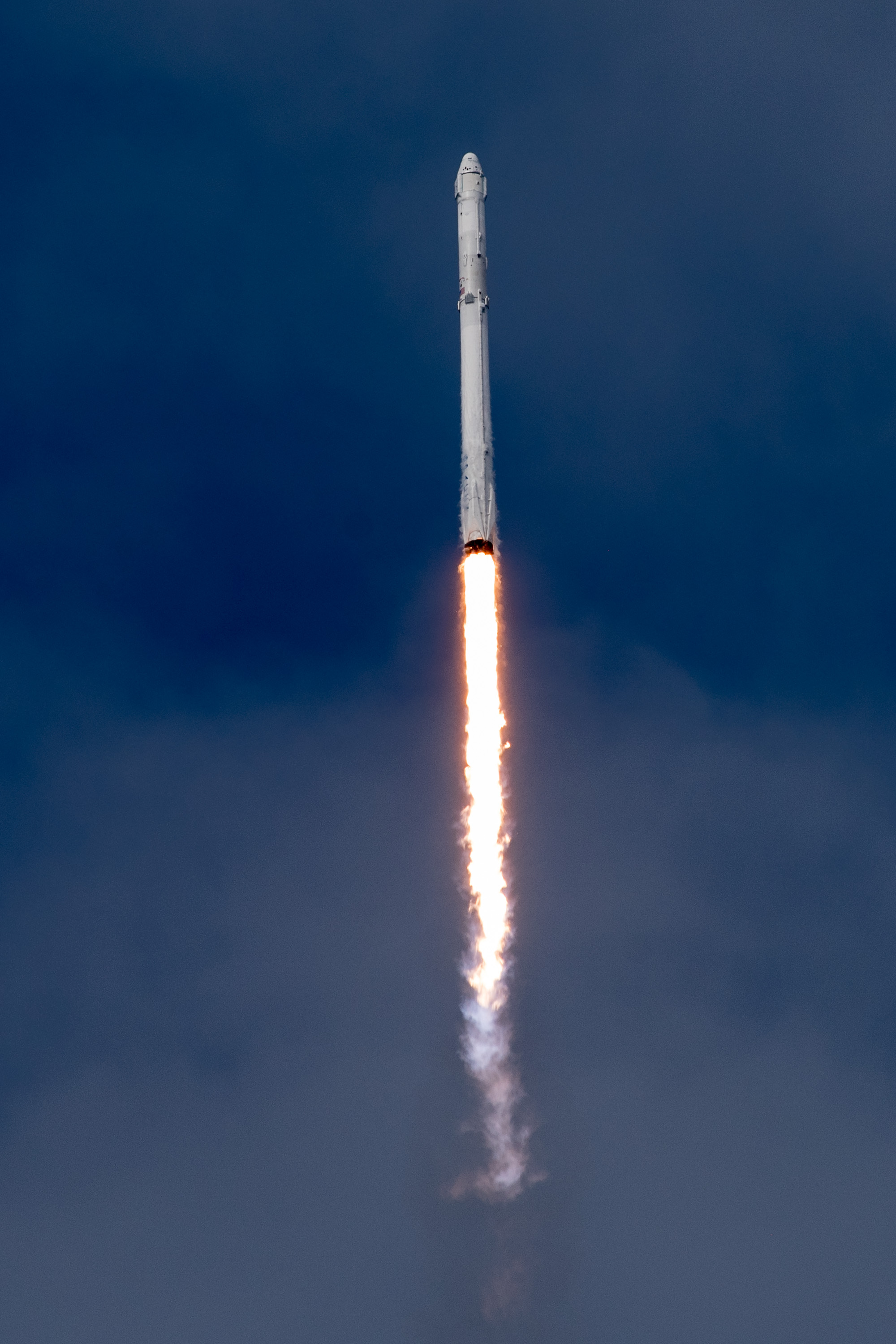
SpaceX launch of CRS-11 with Birds-1 onboard

SpaceX launched the constellation on its CRS-11 mission to the International Space Station on 3 June 2017. Birds-1 was carried in a Dragon spacecraft on a Falcon 9 rocket, launched from NASA's Kennedy Space Center Pad LC-39A, the 100th launch from that pad. This was the first time SpaceX had reused one of its Dragon capsules.

The satellites were ejected from the Kibō module of the International Space Station on 7 July 2017. On ejection, astronaut Jack Fischer said on Twitter, "Another great example of International Cooperation today on @Space_Station -- launched 5 micro-satellites from 5 countries off the JAXA arm!"

The constellation orbited the Earth at an altitude of 400 kilometres (250 mi) and at an inclination of 51.61°. The satellites travelled around the Earth every 91 minutes at a velocity of 7.67 kilometres per second (4.77 mi/s).

=== Operations ===
The satellites communicated with seven ground stations: one in each of the countries participating in the Birds-1 program, and one each in Thailand and Taiwan. The same radio frequency was used for all of the satellites. The constellation could have music uploaded via a digi-singer. It was processed on the satellite, then transmitted to Earth with an ultra high frequency (UHF) antenna as voice FM data.

Ghana intended to use the data to help monitor illegal mining and map the coastline. BRAC Onnesha's purpose was to image and analyze vegetation and forestry, urbanisation, flood, water resources, and urbanization. The purpose of Nigeria EduSat-1 was more educational in nature; it was planned to be a technology demonstrator and to familiarize Nigerians with spacecraft design. Mazaalai's intended use was to conduct independent space studies and help mitigate natural disasters.

The five satellites deorbited in May 2019.

== Future work ==
Japan's work with non-spacefaring countries continued with Birds-2 in 2018 with the Philippines, Bhutan, and Malaysia. Mongolia planned to launch a second satellite in 2019. Ghana planned to build GhanaSat-2 and GhanaSat-3, with GhanaSat-2 focusing on water pollution, illegal mining, and deforestation.
