= ZimSat-1 =

Zimbabwean Earth observation satellite

- Mission type: Earth observation
- Operator: Zimbabwe National Geospatial and Space Agency
- COSPAR ID: 1998-067UP
- SATCAT no.: 54537

Spacecraft properties
- Spacecraft type: 1U CubeSat
- Bus: CubeSat

Start of mission
- Launch date: 7 November 2022 (launch to ISS); 2 December 2022 (deployment)
- Rocket: Antares 230+ (NG-18)
- Launch site: Wallops Flight Facility
- Deployed from: JEM Small Satellite Orbital Deployer

Orbital parameters
- Reference system: Geocentric orbit
- Regime: Low Earth orbit

ZimSat-1 is Zimbabwe's first satellite and an Earth observation CubeSat operated by the Zimbabwe National Geospatial and Space Agency. It was developed through international cooperation under the BIRDS-5 satellite development programme coordinated by the Kyushu Institute of Technology.

== Background ==
ZimSat-1 was developed through the BIRDS-5 programme, an international initiative supporting emerging space nations in designing, building and operating small satellites.

== Launch ==
ZimSat-1 was launched on 7 November 2022 aboard Northrop Grumman's NG-18 Cygnus mission to the International Space Station. After arrival at the ISS, the satellite was deployed into orbit on 2 December 2022.

== Spacecraft ==
ZimSat-1 is a 1U CubeSat developed through the BIRDS-5 programme coordinated by the Kyushu Institute of Technology. The satellite was assembled, integrated and tested as part of the programme's standardized CubeSat platform for emerging space nations.

The spacecraft carries Earth observation and technology demonstration payloads, including a multispectral camera, image-processing capabilities, a Particle Instrument for Nano-satellite (PINO), and an Automatic Packet Reporting System (APRS) digipeater for amateur radio applications.

== Mission ==
ZimSat-1 operates in low Earth orbit and collects Earth observation data. Data from the satellite are intended to support environmental monitoring, disaster response and resource management. The mission also provides operational experience in satellite control and data handling for Zimbabwean researchers and engineers.
