= Richard Damoah =

Ghanaian physicist

- Born: Richard Damoah
- Citizenship: Ghana
- Education: Accra Academy; University of Cape Coast; University of Bremen; Technical University of Munich
- Scientific career
- Fields: Physics; Atmospheric Physics; Meteorology
- Workplaces: NASA University of Edinburgh Morgan State University University of Waterloo Goddard Space Flight Center

Richard Damoah is a Ghanaian physicist. He is a physics professor at Morgan State University, and a research scientist at the Goddard Space Flight Center, NASA.

== Education ==
Damoah had his secondary education at the Accra Academy from 1987 to 1996. He proceeded to the University of Cape Coast in 1997, where he graduated in 2000 with his bachelor of science degree. Following his undergraduate studies, Damoah enrolled at the University of Bremen for his postgraduate studies. He earned his master's degree in 2002, and continued at the Technical University of Munich for his doctorate degree, which he obtained in 2005.

== Career ==
Damoah begun as a Physics teacher in 1997 at Sahess Senior High School. A year later, he joined the T. I. Ahmadiyya Senior High School as a Math teacher while he studied at the University of Cape Coast. He remained a Maths teacher at the school until 1998.

Following his studies at the University of Bremen, Damoah worked as a teaching assistant at the Institute of Environmental Physics in Bremen for a year. In 2006, he joined the teaching faculty of the University of Edinburgh as a research fellow on the NERC (Natural Environmental Research Council) award. There, he taught Atmospheric Science and Meteorology for two years. In 2009, he joined the University of Waterloo as a research fellow, he worked in that capacity until 2011 when joined the Goddard Space Flight Center as a research scientist.

In 2007 Damoah became a member of the Royal Meteorological Society, and in 2009 he became member of the Canadian Meteorological and Oceanographic Society. He has been an International Baccalaureate examiner since 2004, and a Mozaic co-investigator since 2007. In 2010, he was made chairman of the Atmospheric Science Program of the All Nations University, Ghana that launched the GhanaSat-1. He is an advisory board member of the Space Science Systems Research Institute.

== Research interests ==
Damoah's research interest are in climate and human health, atmospheric science, atmospheric pollution, atmospheric modelling, and atmospheric dispersion. He quantifies the effect of atmospheric pollutants on the quality of the air and climate through the application of observations and (remote sensing and in-situ), the use of radiative transfer models, and global 3D models. He has also been an editor for the Central European Journal of Geosciences (now Open Geosciences) since 2008.

== See also ==
- GhanaSat-1
