= BRAC Onnesha =

First Bangladeshi nanosatellite

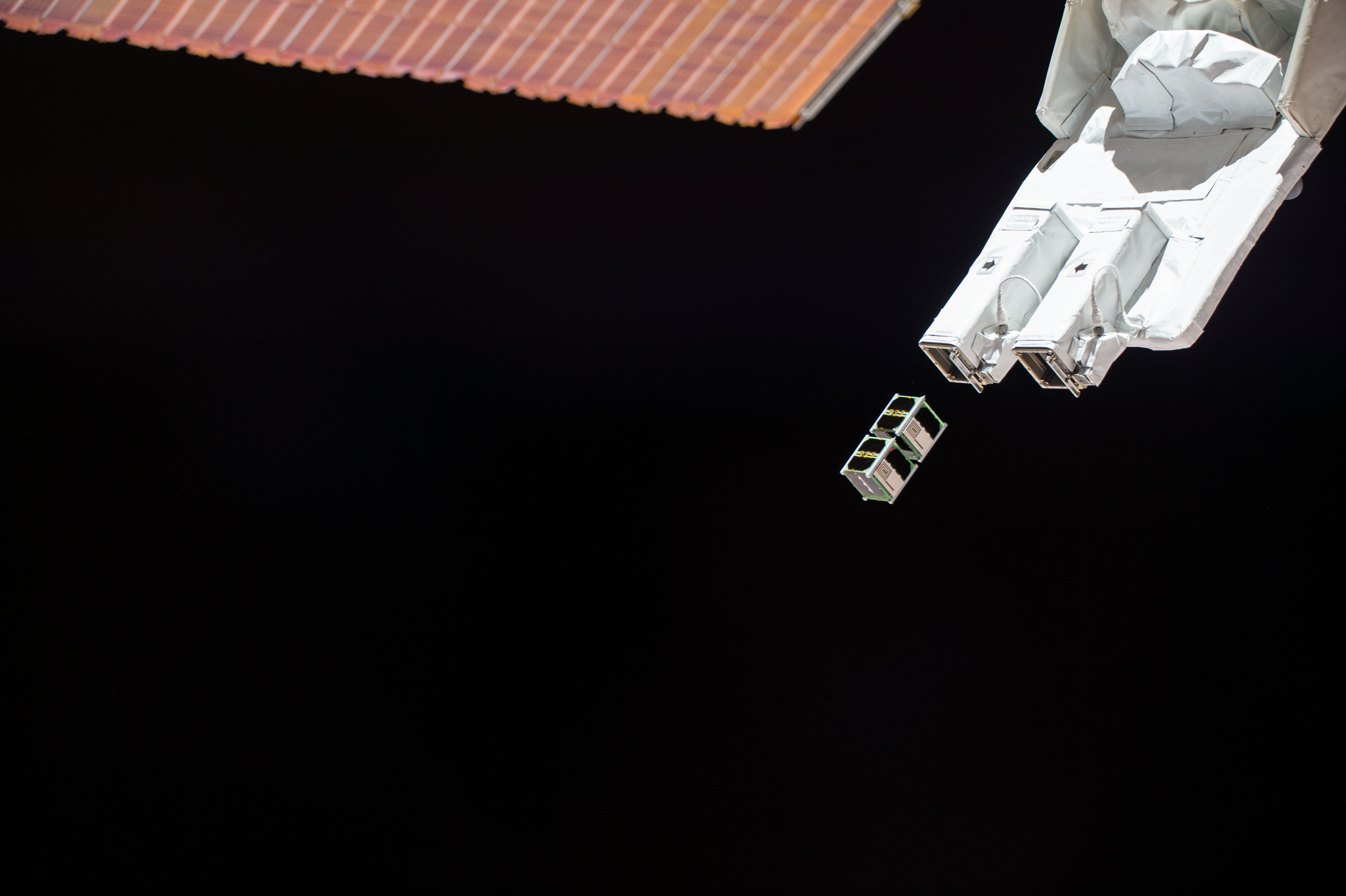
- BRAC Onnesha at the bottom of Birds-1 second deploying batch
- Names: Bird BB
- Mission type: Technology demonstration Earth observation
- Operator: BRAC University
- COSPAR ID: 1998-067MX
- SATCAT no.: 42823
- Mission duration: 24 months (planned); 21 months, 28 days (achieved)

Spacecraft properties
- Spacecraft type: 1U CubeSat
- Manufacturer: BRAC University
- Launch mass: 1 kg
- Dimensions: 10 x 10 x 10 cm
- Power: watts

Start of mission
- Launch date: 3 June 2017, 21:07:38 UTC
- Rocket: Falcon 9 FT, CRS-11
- Launch site: Kennedy, LC-39A
- Contractor: SpaceX
- Deployed from: Nanoracks CubeSat Deployer
- Deployment date: 7 July 2017, 08:51 UTC

End of mission
- Disposal: Deorbited
- Decay date: 6 May 2019

Orbital parameters
- Reference system: Geocentric orbit
- Regime: Low Earth orbit
- Perigee altitude: 395.5 km
- Apogee altitude: 406.2 km
- Inclination: 51.64°
- Period: 92.57 minutes

BRAC Onnesha was the first nanosatellite built in Bangladesh to be launched into space. The satellite was designed and built in conjunction with the Japanese Kyushu Institute of Technology's Birds-1 program, which has the goal of helping non-spacefaring countries to build their first satellite. It was designed and built over a two-year period.

The satellite had imaging capabilities and could transmit songs to Earth that were uploaded to its memory. It was launched on a Falcon 9 rocket to the International Space Station on 3 June 2017, after which it was released from the Kibō module. The satellite completed an orbit once every 92 minutes. The satellite deorbited on 6 May 2019.

== Background ==
Japan supports non-spacefaring countries to build their first satellite through a program called the Joint Global Multi-Nation Birds Satellite (BIRDS) project. Besides Japan, four countries participated in the Birds-1 program: Ghana, Mongolia, Nigeria, and Bangladesh. The five satellites were identical in their design.

== Development ==
The idea to develop a satellite was conceived in 2013. On 15 June 2016, Syed Saad Andaleeb, Vice Chancellor at BRAC University, signed a contract with the Kyushu Institute of Technology (Kyutech), Japan, on behalf of BRAC University. This led to the collaborative building of the first experimental university-made nano-satellite of Bangladesh, designed, developed and assembled by three Bangladeshi students at the Kyushu Institute of Technology. On 8 February 2017, Andaleeb received BRAC Onnesha from Kyutech's President Yuji Oie and Mengu Cho, Kyutech's Director of the Laboratory of Spacecraft Environment Interaction Engineering.

BRAC University took up an initiative to start space and remote sensing research in collaboration with Kyutech and the Space Research and Remote Sensing Organization (SPARRSO). BRAC University has built a ground station at its Mohakhali campus to analyse data and photographs sent from space for further research purposes.

Professor Mengu Cho of Kyutech said, "BRAC ONNESHA was easy to build and affordable and their prime objective was to educate the students so that they could go back to build one completely by themselves, presumably in October 2017".

The two-year period spanning the development, construction, launch and operation of the satellites engaged three university students from each of the five participating countries. All five satellites had to be identical to each other in the class of a 1U CubeSat. The satellite cost about US$500,000 to manufacture and launch. They were expected to last 1.1 years.

== Mission ==
=== Launch ===
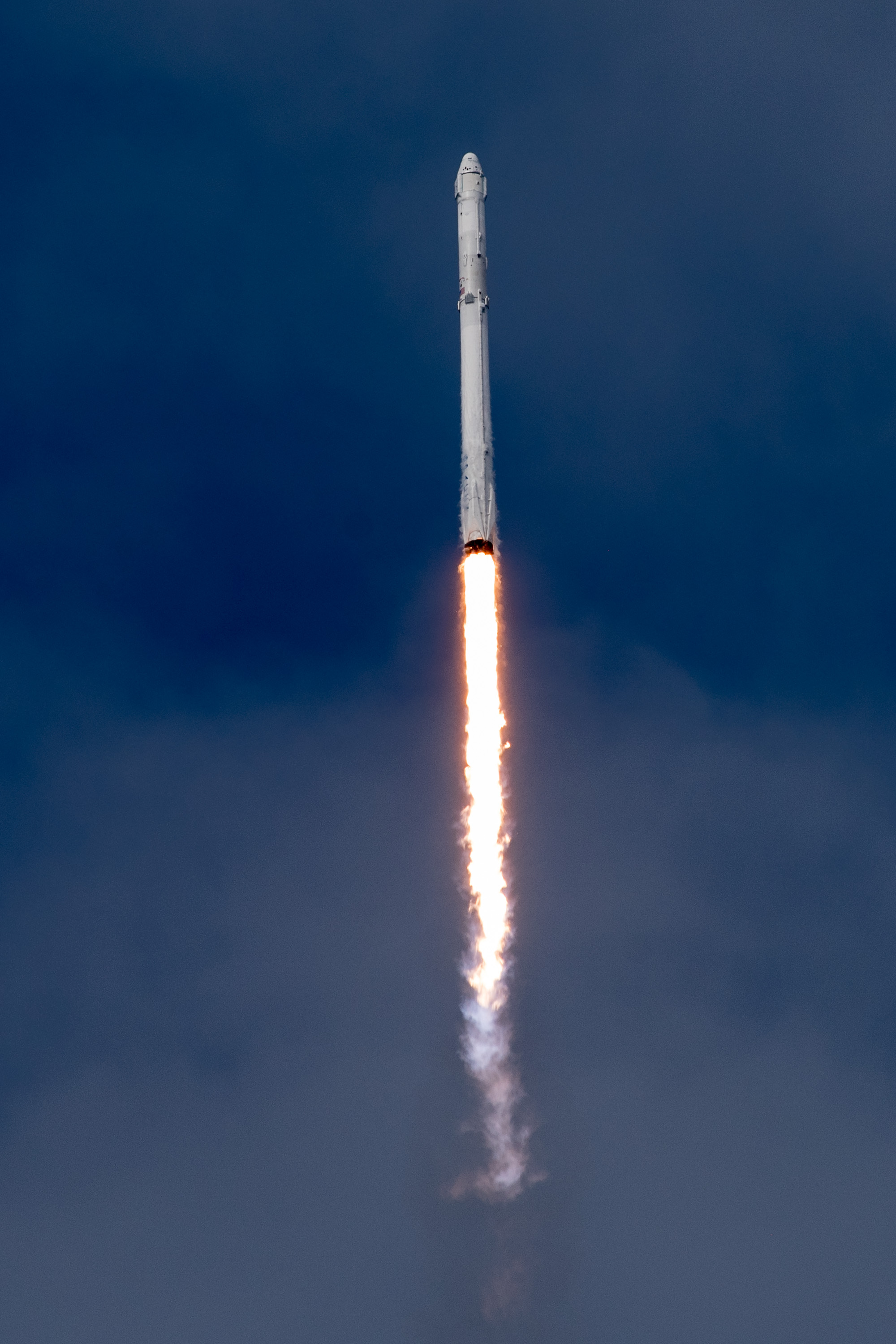
SpaceX launch of CRS-11 with BRAC Onnesha onboard.

SpaceX launched the satellite on its CRS-11 mission to the International Space Station (ISS) on 3 June 2017. The satellite was carried in a Dragon spacecraft on a Falcon 9 rocket, launched from NASA's Kennedy Space Center, LC-39A. This was the 100th launch from LC-39A and the first time SpaceX reused one of its Dragon capsules. Once on the ISS, the satellite was deployed from the Japanese Kibō module.

The satellite orbited the Earth at an altitude of approximately 400 kilometres (250 mi) and at an inclination of 51.6°, completing an orbit every 92.57 minutes at a velocity of 7.67 kilometres per second (4.77 mi/s).

=== Operations ===
The satellite communicated with seven ground stations: one in each of the countries participating in the Birds-1 program, and one each in Thailand and Taiwan. Bangladesh's ground station, inaugurated 25 May 2017, is on the top of a building at BRAC University.

BRAC Onnesha was a nanosatellite shaped as a 10 centimetres (3.9 in) cube capable of completing one orbit 400 kilometres (250 mi) above the ground in 90 minutes and passing over Bangladesh four to six times a day. The primary objective of the satellite was to image vegetation, urbanisation, flood, water resources, and forestry. All Birds-1 satellites deorbited in May 2019. BRAC Onnesha was the second to deorbit, decaying on 6 May 2019.
