= SpaceX CRS-11 =

2017 American resupply spaceflight to the ISS

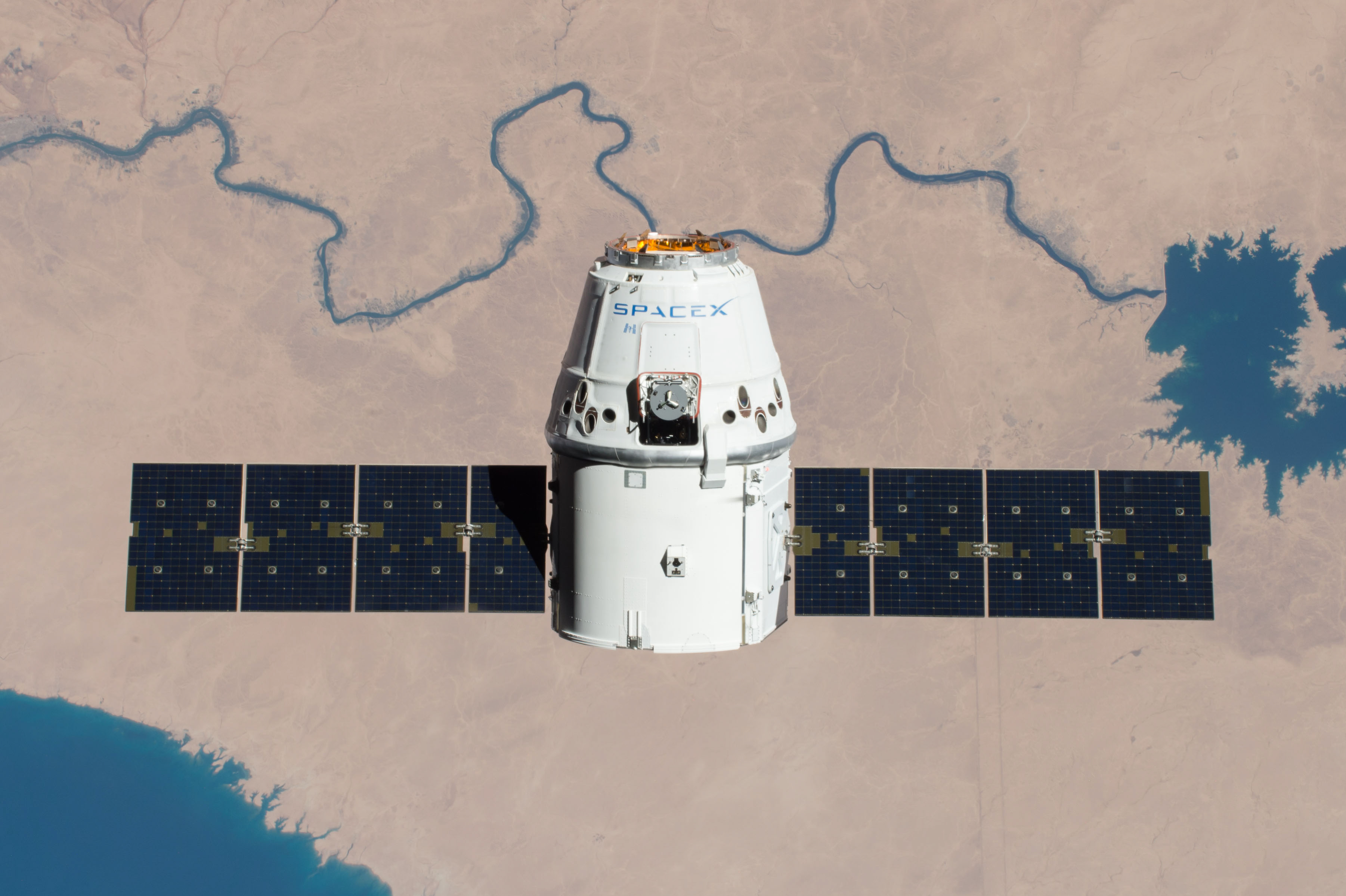
- Dragon 1 C106 on approach to the ISS
- Names: SpX-11
- Mission type: ISS resupply
- Operator: SpaceX
- COSPAR ID: 2017-030A
- SATCAT no.: 42744
- Mission duration: 29 days, 15 hours, 4 minutes

Spacecraft properties
- Spacecraft: Dragon 1 C106
- Spacecraft type: Dragon 1
- Manufacturer: SpaceX
- Dry mass: 4,200 kg (9,300 lb)
- Dimensions: Height: 6.1 m (20 ft); Diameter: 3.7 m (12 ft)

Start of mission
- Launch date: 3 June 2017, 21:07:38 UTC
- Rocket: Falcon 9 Full Thrust (B1035)
- Launch site: Kennedy Space Center, LC-39A

End of mission
- Recovered by: MV GO Searcher
- Landing date: 3 July 2017, 12:12 UTC
- Landing site: Pacific Ocean off Baja California

Orbital parameters
- Reference system: Geocentric orbit
- Regime: Low Earth orbit
- Inclination: 51.66°

Berthing at International Space Station
- Berthing port: Harmony nadir
- RMS capture: 5 June 2017, 13:52 UTC
- Berthing date: 5 June 2017, 16:07 UTC
- Unberthing date: 2 July 2017, ≈18:00 UTC
- RMS release: 3 July 2017, 06:41 UTC
- Time berthed: 27 days, 1 hour, 53 minutes

Cargo
- Mass: 2,708 kg (5,970 lb)
- Pressurised: 1,665 kg (3,671 lb)
- Unpressurised: 1,002 kg (2,209 lb)
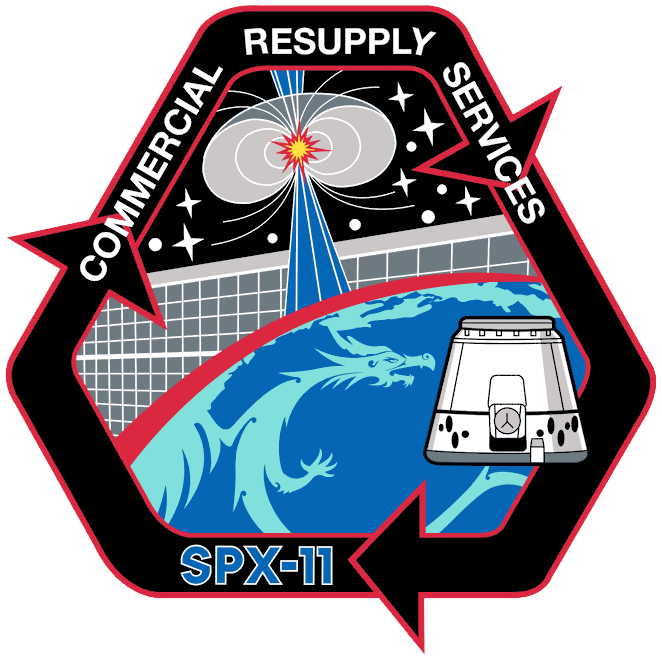
- SpaceX CRS-11 mission patch Commercial Resupply Services Cargo Dragon

SpaceX CRS-11, also known as SpX-11, was a Commercial Resupply Service mission to the International Space Station, launched successfully on 3 June 2017. The mission was contracted by NASA and was flown by SpaceX. The mission utilized a Falcon 9 launch vehicle and was the first reuse of C106, a CRS Dragon cargo vessel that was previously flown on the CRS-4 mission.

CRS-11 was the penultimate of the first twelve missions awarded to SpaceX under the Commercial Resupply Services contract to resupply the International Space Station.

== Rocket and spacecraft ==
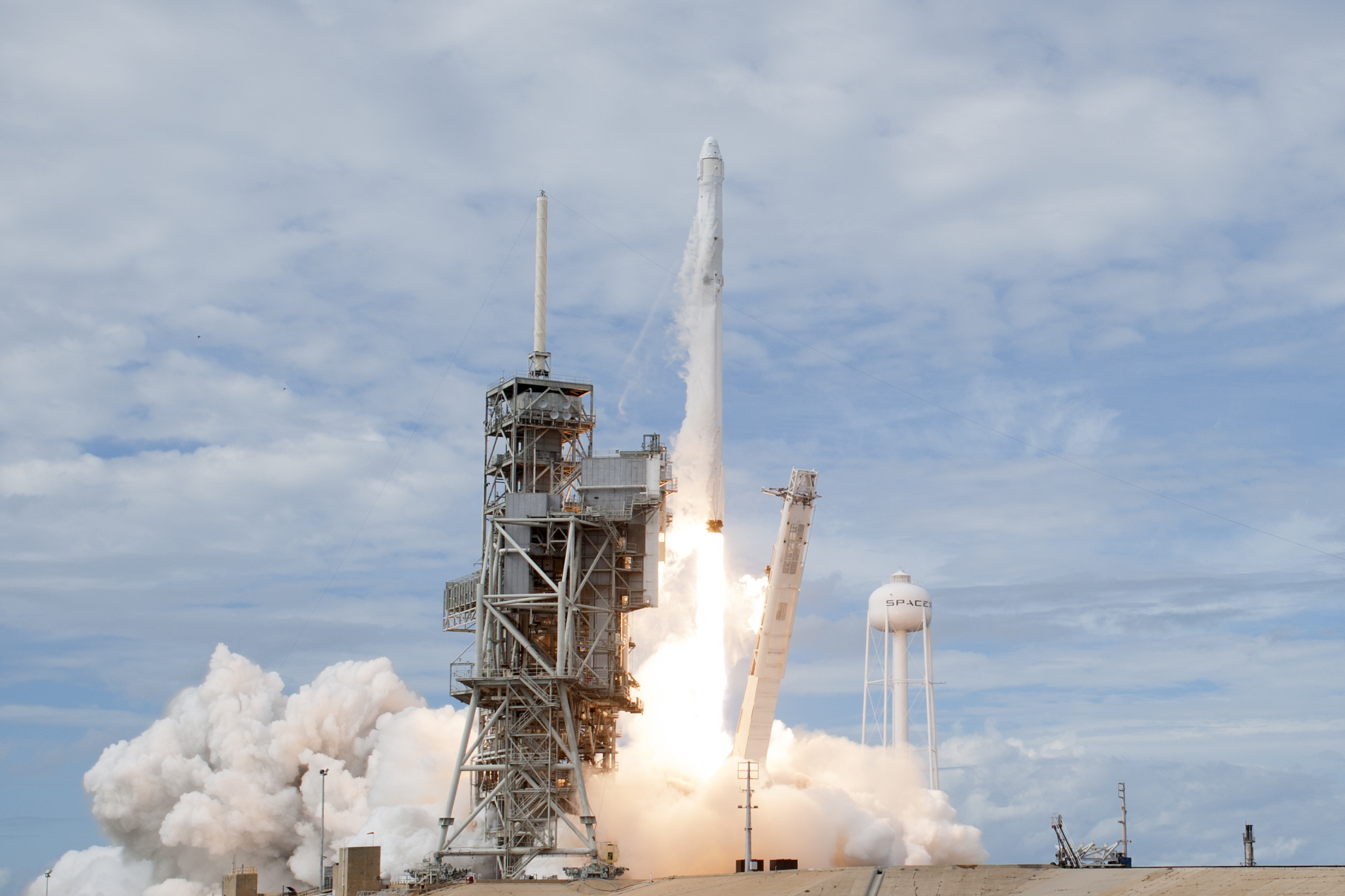
Launch of the CRS-11 mission

The CRS-11 mission was the first time that a Dragon spacecraft has been reused, helping SpaceX to scale back its production line and shift focus to Dragon 2.

CRS-11 launched aboard a Falcon 9 launch vehicle on 3 June 2017 at 21:07:38 UTC from Kennedy Space Center's Launch Complex 39A (LC-39A). The spacecraft rendezvoused with the station on 5 June 2017 and conducted a series of orbit adjustment burns to match speed, altitude, and orientation with the ISS. After arriving at the capture point at 13:37 UTC, the vehicle was snared at 13:52 UTC by the Canadarm2, operated by Peggy Whitson and Jack Fischer. It was berthed to the Harmony module at 16:07 UTC.

The Falcon 9 first stage landed successfully on Landing Zone 1, making it the fifth successful touch down on land and the 11th overall.

The CRS-11 Dragon remained attached to the ISS for just over 27 days. Having been filled with around 2,708 kg (5,970 lb) of cargo, Dragon was unberthed from the station on 2 July 2017 at approximately 18:00 UTC. It was moved to its release position by Canadarm2, but poor sea conditions forced a delay to the following day. On 3 July 2017, at 06:41 UTC, crew members commanded Canadarm2 to release Dragon, and soon after the spacecraft began a series of thruster firings to move it away from the station. About five hours after departing from ISS, Dragon closed its guidance, navigation, and control (GNC) bay door and conducted a 10-minute deorbit burn. Immediately after, the spacecraft jettisoned its cargo trunk and oriented itself for reentry. Dragon splashed down in the Pacific Ocean off Baja California at 12:12 UTC.

== Payload ==
NASA has contracted for the CRS-11 mission from SpaceX and therefore determines the primary payload, date/time of launch, and orbital parameters for the Dragon space capsule. CRS-11 carried a total of 2,708 kg (5,970 lb) of material into orbit. This included 1,665 kg (3,671 lb) of pressurised cargo with packaging bound for the International Space Station, and 1,002 kg (2,209 lb) of unpressurised cargo composed of three external station experiments: Neutron Star Interior Composition Explorer (NICER), MUSES and Roll Out Solar Array (ROSA).

The following is a breakdown of cargo bound for the ISS:

- Science investigations: 1,069 kg (2,357 lb)
  - Advanced Plant Habitat (APH) - a NASA- and ORBITEC-developed payload built in Madison, Wisconsin. APH is a fully automated facility that is used to conduct plant bioscience research on the ISS.
- Crew supplies: 242 kg (534 lb)
- Vehicle hardware: 199 kg (439 lb)
- Spacewalk equipment: 56 kg (123 lb)
- Computer resources: 27 kg (60 lb)
- External payloads:
  - Roll Out Solar Array (ROSA): 325 kg (717 lb)
  - Neutron Star Interior Composition Explorer (NICER): 372 kg (820 lb)
  - Multiple User System for Earth Sensing (MUSES): 305 kg (672 lb)

A constellation of five CubeSats was also carried on the mission as part of Birds-1, one each from the countries of Japan, Nigeria, Bangladesh, Ghana, and Mongolia. The satellites from Bangladesh (BRAC ONNESHA), Ghana (GhanaSat-1), and Mongolia (Mazaalai) were those countries' first satellites in space.

== Gallery ==
SpaceX CRS-11
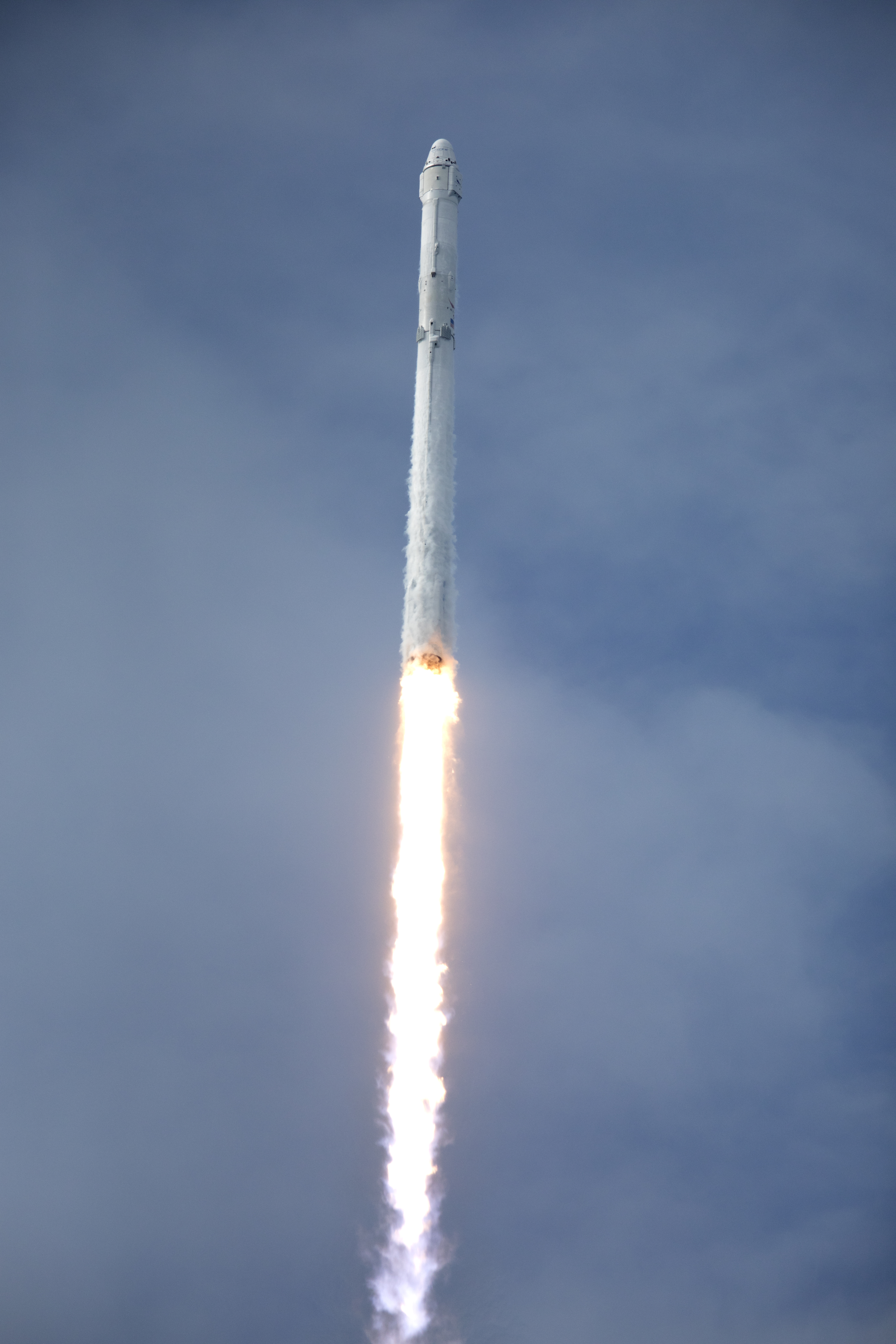
Launch of CRS-11

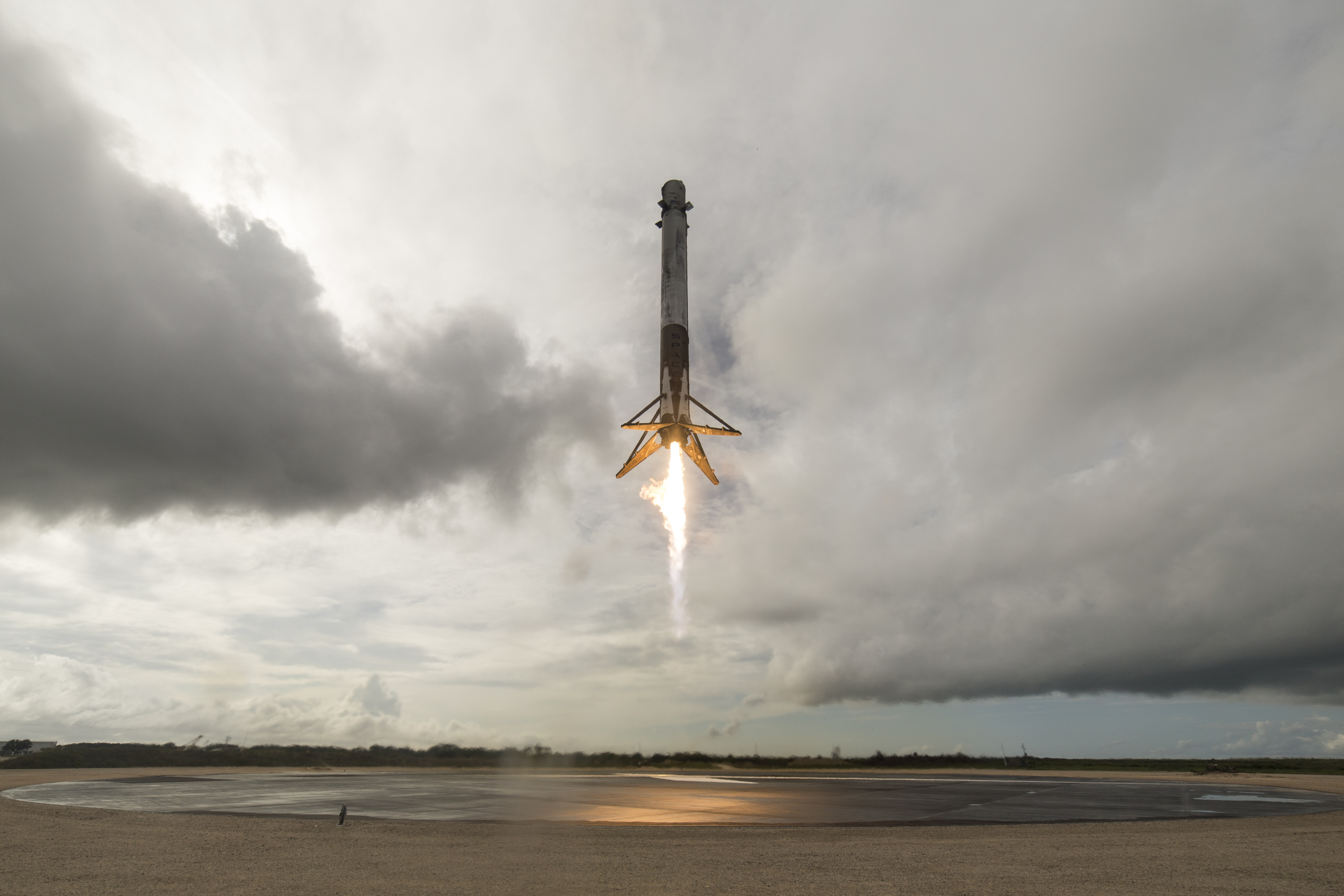
Falcon 9 landing on LZ-1

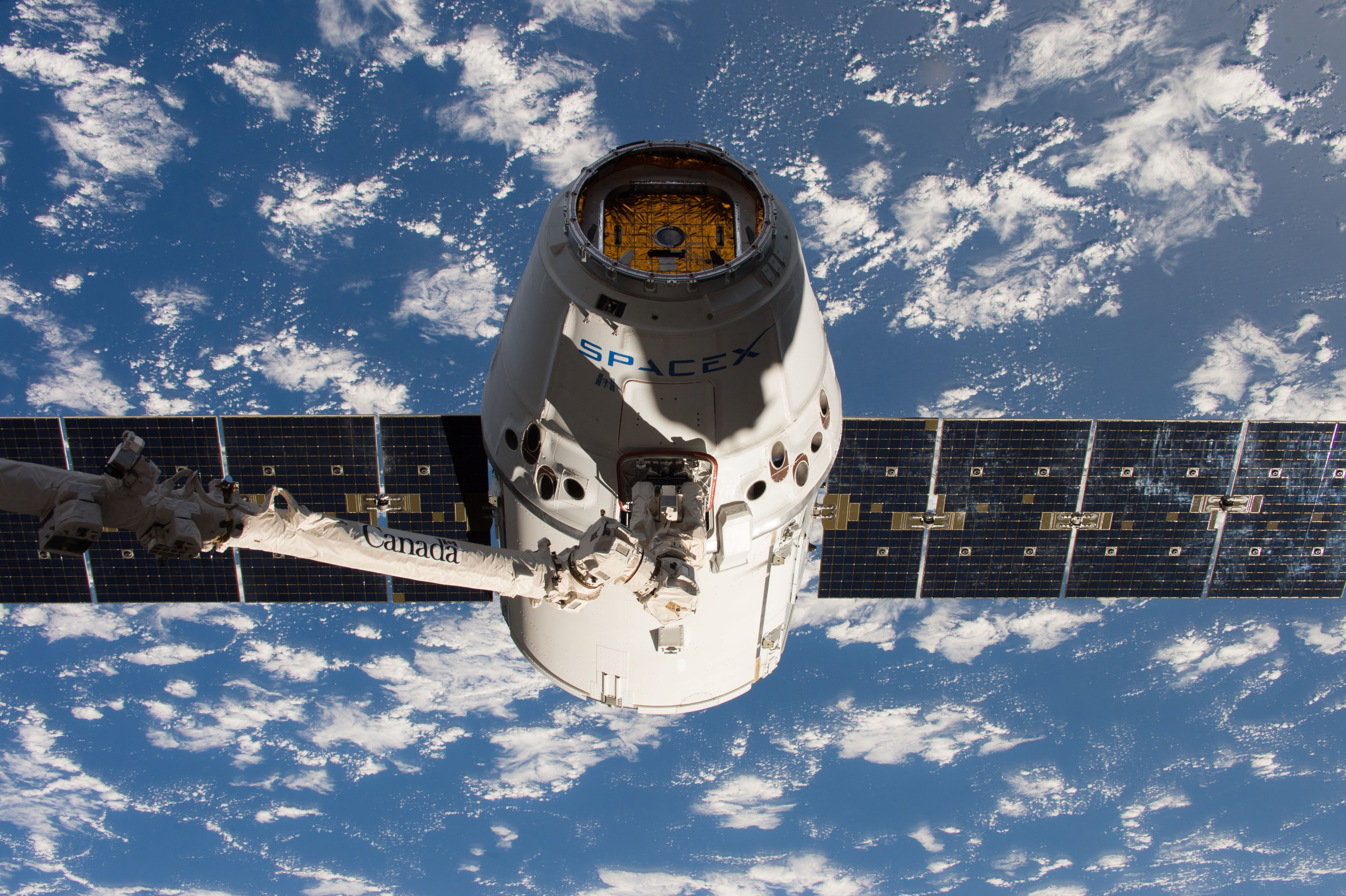
Dragon grappled by the ISS

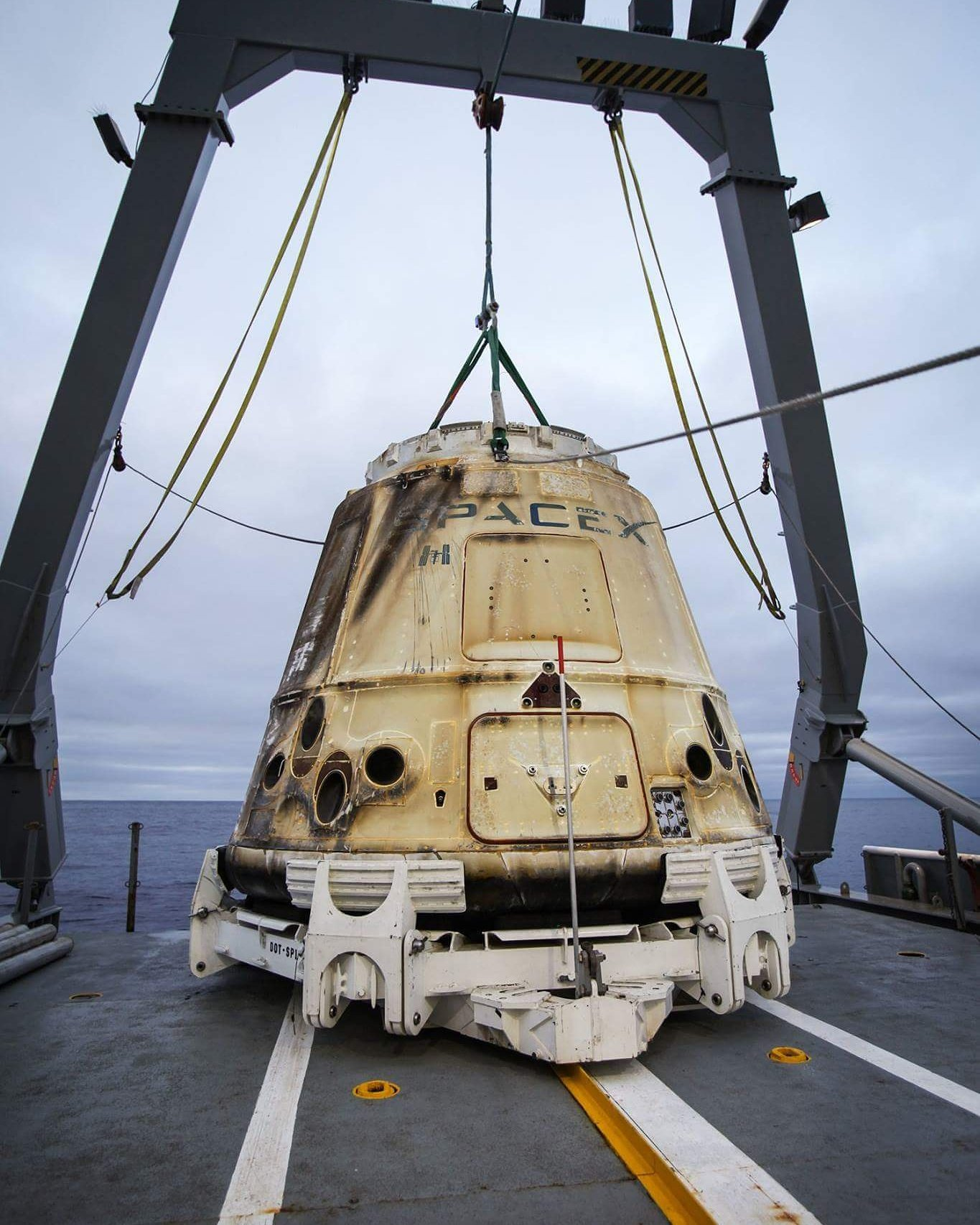
Dragon after landing and recovery

== See also ==
- Uncrewed spaceflights to the International Space Station
- List of Falcon 9 and Falcon Heavy launches
- 2017 in spaceflight
