= National Space Research and Development Agency =

National space agency of Nigeria

Agency overview
- Abbreviation: NASRDA
- Formed: 5 May 1999; 27 years ago
- Type: Space agency
- Jurisdiction: Federal Government of Nigeria
- Headquarters: Lugbe, Abuja, Nigeria; 9°4′N 7°29′E
- Administrator: Mathew Olumide Adepoju; Director-General
- Owner: Nigeria
- Employees: 5,500 (2025)
- Annual budget: ₦ 22.69 billion (2023)
- Website: central.nasrda.gov.ng

The National Space Research and Development Agency (NASRDA) is the national space agency of Nigeria. It is a parastatal under Federal Ministry of Innovation, Science and Technology. The agency is based in the Nigerian capital city of Abuja, in the Lugbe district, and has a ground receiving station, among other sites. In the past, it has cooperated in space technology with the United Kingdom, China, Ukraine and Russia. The agency has struggled with meeting its financial plans and some of its facilities are rundown. Despite this, the space agency is one of the most advanced space agencies in Africa, boasting of four satellites and very grand ambitions. Nigeria's satellites have been praised for their high-resolution images. NASRDA is host to one of UN-SPIDER's Regional Support Offices (RSO) in Africa.

== History ==
The National Space Research and Development Agency (NASRDA) was formally established on the 5th of May 1999 by the Federal Government of Nigeria following the approval of the National Space Policy and Programmes by president Olusegun Obasanjo and the Nigerian government with a primary objective of establishing a "fundamental policy for the development of space science and technology" with an initial budget of $93 million.

In May 2006, the new extended national space program was adopted. NASRDA has launched four satellites of its own, the first one in 2003 and the last one in 2009.

== Scope ==
The initial scope of the Nigerian Space Programme (NSP) to be implemented by the National Space Research and Development Agency (NASRDA) should include:

The study of basic space science in order to lay the foundation for deriving maximum benefits from the nation's participation in the space enterprise; For the attainment of space capabilities, Nigeria's efforts should focus on research and rigorous education, engineering development, design and manufacture, particularly in the areas of instrumentation, rocketry and small satellites as well as in satellite data acquisition, processing, analysis and management of related software; The establishment of a national earth observation station for remote sensing and satellite meteorology data acquisition. The provision of efficient, reliable, and adequate telecommunications services in Nigeria to enhance the growth of the industrial, commercial and administrative sectors of the economy. The focus areas of the Nigerian Space Programme (NSP) include:

- Basic Space Science and Technology to provide an understanding of how the universe works and its impact is on the world, with the aim of deriving maximum benefits from the nation's participation in the space enterprise.
- Remote Sensing to help Nigerians understand and manage our environment and natural resources using space-acquired information. This technology will enable us to better understand our land, air, and water resources and their associated problems.
- Satellite Meteorology to study atmospheric and weather sciences using satellite data to facilitate the effective management of our environment.
- Communication and Information Technology to provide efficient and reliable telecommunications services for Nigeria in order to enhance the growth of the industrial, commercial and administrative sectors of the economy.
- Defence and Security to help the Federal Government shall develop a necessary Space Science Technology (SST) programme that will address the national needs of Nigeria. For this purpose, the government shall establish a Defence Space Command in the Ministry of Defence. The Command shall comprise representatives of the defence, intelligence, security and law enforcement services and report through the Ministry of Defence.

== Satellites ==
Five satellites have been launched by the Nigerian government into outer space. Early plans to launch a national satellite in 2000 were not executed. The NigeriaSat-1 was the first Nigerian satellite and built by a United Kingdom-based satellite technology company, Surrey Space Technology Limited (SSTL ltd) under the Nigerian government sponsorship for $30 million. The satellite was launched by Kosmos-3M rocket from the Russian Plesetsk spaceport on 27 September 2003. NigeriaSat-1 was part of the worldwide Disaster Monitoring Constellation System. The primary objectives of the Nigeriasat-1 were: to give early warning signals of environmental disaster; to help detect and control desertification in the northern part of Nigeria; to assist in demographic planning; to establish the relationship between vectors and the environment that breeds malaria and to give early warning signals on future outbreaks of meningitis using remote sensing technology; to provide the technology needed to bring education to all parts of the country through distant learning; and to aid in conflict resolution and border disputes by mapping out state and International borders.

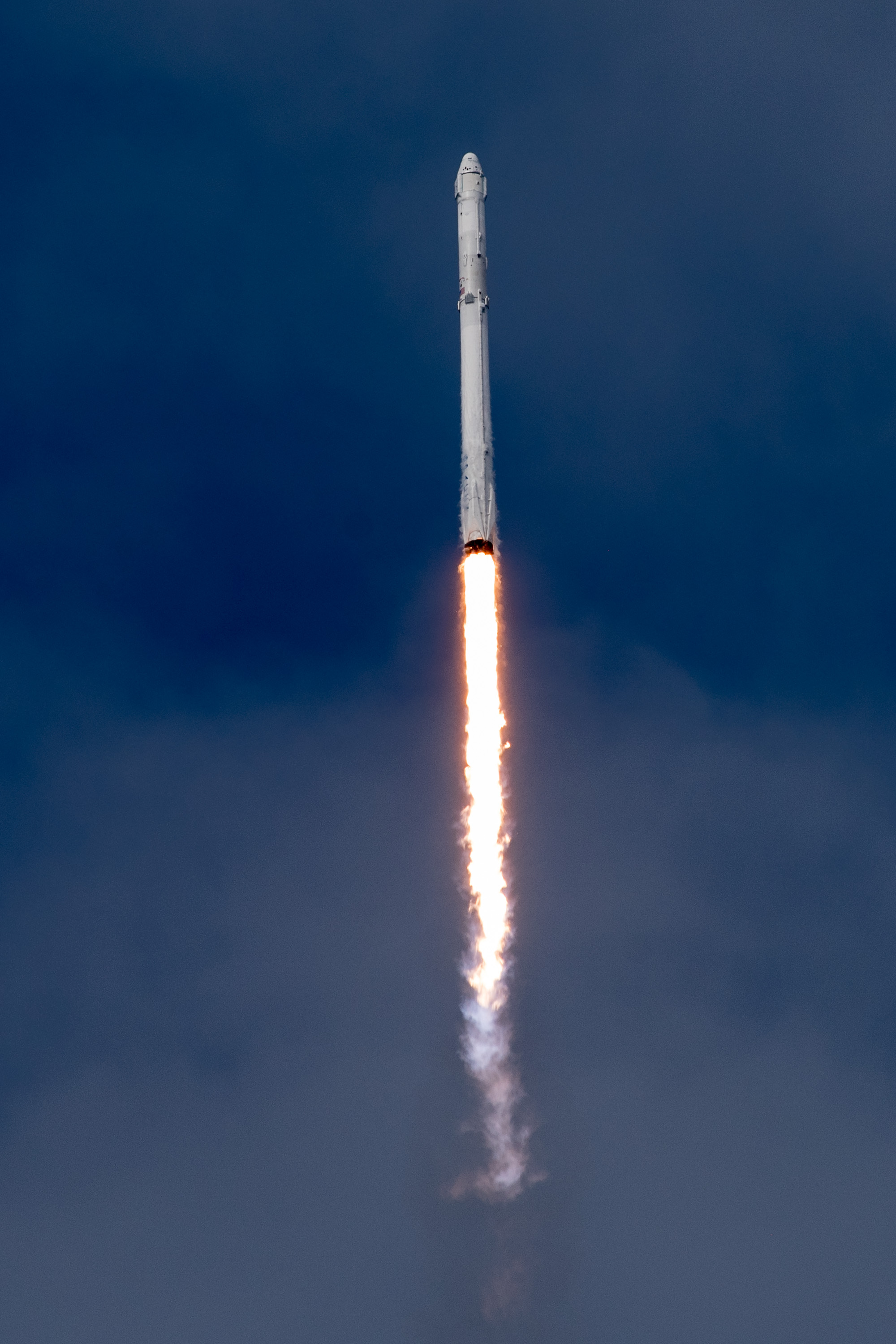
SpaceX launch of CRS-11 with Nigeria EduSat-1 on board in 2017

NigeriaSat-2 and NigeriaSat-X, Nigeria's third and fourth satellites, were built as a high-resolution earth satellite by SSTL for DMC system also. It has 2.5-metre resolution panchromatic (very high resolution), 5-metre multispectral (high resolution, NIR red, green and red bands), and 32-metre multispectral (medium resolution, NIR red, green and red bands) antennas. This satellite was launched into orbit by the Ukrainian Dnepr rocket from a Yasny military base in Russia on 17 August 2011.

NigComSat-1, a Nigerian satellite ordered and built in China in 2004, was Nigeria's second satellite and Africa's first communication satellite. It was launched on 13 May 2007, aboard a Chinese Long March 3B carrier rocket, from the Xichang Satellite Launch Centre in China. The spacecraft was operated by NigComSat a company under the Nigerian Space Agency, NASRDA. On 11 November 2008, NigComSat-1 failed in orbit after running out of power due to an anomaly in its solar array. It was based on the Chinese DFH-4 satellite bus, and carries a variety of transponders: 4 C band; 14 K_{u} band; 8 K_{a} band; and 2 L band. It was designed to provide coverage to many parts of Africa, and the K_{a} band transponders would also cover Italy.

On 10 November 2008 (0900 GMT), the satellite was reportedly switched off for analysis and to avoid a possible collision with other satellites. According to Nigerian Communications Satellite Limited, it was put into "emergency mode operation in order to effect mitigation and repairs". The satellite eventually failed after losing power on 11 November 2008.

On 24 March 2009, the Nigerian Federal Ministry of Science and Technology, NigComSat Ltd. and CGWIC signed a further contract for the in-orbit delivery of the NigComSat-1R satellite. NigComSat-1R was also a DFH-4 satellite, and is expected to be delivered in the fourth quarter of 2011 as a replacement for the failed NigComSat-1.

On 19 December 2011, a new Nigerian communications satellite was launched into orbit by China in Xichang. The satellite according to Nigerian President Goodluck Jonathan which was paid for by the insurance policy on NigComSat-1 which de-orbited in 2009, would have a positive impact on national development in various sectors such as communications, internet services, health, agriculture, environmental protection and national security.

- NigeriaSat-1 is a satellite of the standard Disaster Monitoring Constellation (DMC) design. It has 100 kg mass and carries an optical imaging payload developed by SSTL to provide 32 m ground resolution with an exceptionally wide swath width of over 640 km. The payload uses green, red and near infrared bands equivalent to Landsat TM+ bands 2, 3 and 4. Images are stored in a 1-gigabyte solid-state data recorder and returned via an 8-Mbit/s S-band downlink. NigeriaSat-1 can image scenes as large as 640 x 560 km, providing unparalleled wide-area, medium-resolution data. The data will be used within Nigeria to monitor pollution, land use and other medium-scale phenomena. Launched on 27 September 2003.
- NigeriaSat-2 and NigeriaSat-X with 300 kg mass each - to replace NigeriaSat-1, commenced November 6, 2006, launched 17 August 2011.
- NigComSat-1 Communications satellite providing rural internet access - launched on 13 May 2007, aboard a Chinese Long March 3B carrier rocket, from the Xichang Satellite Launch Centre in China. The satellite was the second Nigerian satellite to be placed into orbit. On 10 November 2008 (0900 GMT), the satellite was reportedly switched off, because it lost both of its solar arrays. The satellite is a total loss. The satellite was owned and operated by Nigerian Communication Satellite Limited, an SPV, incorporated as a state-owned enterprise, fully funded and owned by the Federal Government of Nigeria. NigComSat Limited is currently being supervised by the newly created Ministry of Communications Technology and regulated by NCC and NBC.
- NigComSat-1R - to replace the lost NigComSat-1, launched by China on 19 December 2011 with no cost to Nigeria.

== Centers and Laboratories ==
- National Center for Remote Sensing
- Center for Geodesy and Geodynamics
- Centre For Space Transport Propulsion
- Center for Basic Space Science

== Future projects ==
=== Satellites ===
NigComSat-2 and NigComSat-3 - more communications satellites to extend Nigerian Communication Satellite limited capacity, planning to launch in 2012 and 2013. As of 2021, they have not been launched.

NigeriaSAT-1 - dual-aimed military/civil Earth monitoring satellite with synthetic aperture radar, planning to launch in 2015. As of 2023, they have not been launched.

Edusat-2 is a satellite planned to be launched in June or July 2021. It plans to be the first indigenous satellite developed by NASRDA engineers. It hopes to be launched from the International Space Station. It is expected to cost about ₦20,000,000.

=== Domestic satellite development ===
Robert Ajayi Boroffice announced at a public lecture on space technology development that Nigeria will be able to build indigenous satellites in the country without foreign assistance by 2018. As of 2021, all of Nigeria's 4 satellites have used foreign assistance.

=== Satellite launch vehicle and spaceport ===
Robert Ajayi Boroffice told the press that Nigeria will take advantage of its geographic location to launch into near-equatorial orbit by an indigenous developed space launcher from a national spaceport to be built around 2025–2028. It may also include collaboration with Ukraine.

=== Planetary researches ===
A probe to the Moon is planned for launch in 2030. That being said, there has not been any official updates on the production.

=== Astronauts ===
Nigeria announced plans in 2016 to send an astronaut to space by 2030, initially exploring partnerships with Russia and later China. Despite these ambitions, no government-backed astronaut program has materialized due to high costs, as confirmed by NASRDA in 2024.

However, in June 2025, Nigerian-born philanthropist Chief Owolabi Salis became the first Nigerian to travel to space aboard Blue Origin's NS-33 mission, marking a historic milestone.

While the infamous “lost Nigerian astronaut” email remains a hoax, Nigeria continues to focus on satellite development and space-based research, including agricultural experiments aboard NASA missions. As NASRDA's former Director-General stated, “We are not part of the race for the moon or Mars.”.

== See also ==
- List of government space agencies
- Nigeria EduSat-1 (launched in 2017)
