= All Nations University =

University in Ghana

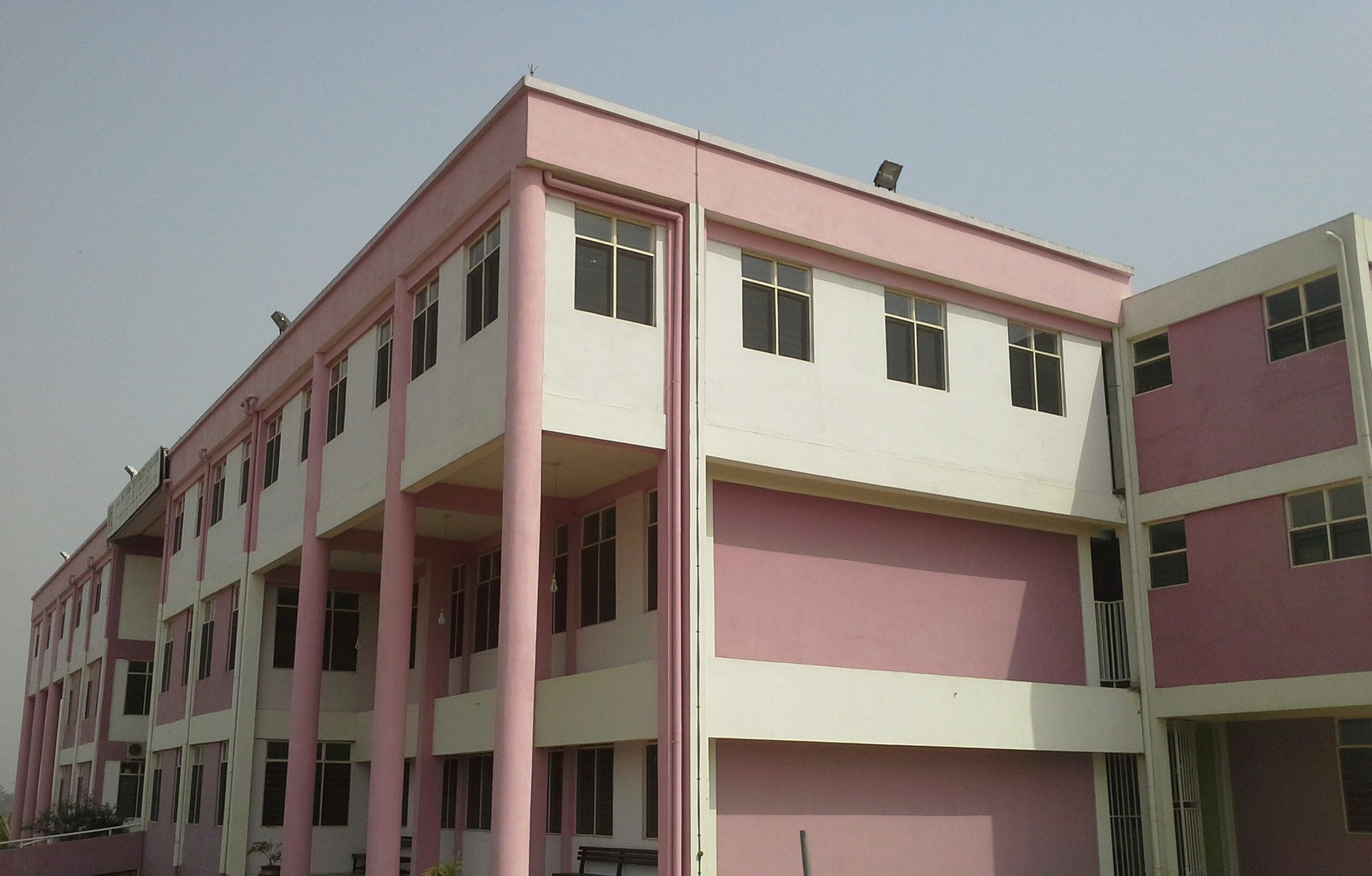
- All Nations University (ANU) School of Engineering, Main Campus, Koforidua - Akwadum Highway
- Motto: Equipped for every good work
- Type: Private
- Established: October 2002; 23 years ago
- President: Dr. Samuel Donkor
- Location: Koforidua, Eastern Region, Ghana; 6°05′26″N 0°15′48″W
- Website: www.anuc.edu.gh

All Nations University (ANU) is a private Christian university in Koforidua, in the Eastern Region of Ghana.

== History ==
ANU was founded as All Nations University College (ANUC) by the All Nations Full Gospel Church in Toronto, Canada through the All Nations International Development Agency. The project was led by Rev. Dr. Samuel Donkor in Ghana, who is the university's current president. The Ghanaian government gave approval in 1996; the first class of 37 students arrived in October 2002 under the mentorship of Karunya University in India.

It became an accredited university college in Ghana in October 2002. In 2008, the college formalized its relationship with Kwame Nkrumah University of Science and Technology, becoming a mentee institution to KNUST. On May 28, 2020, ANUC was granted a presidential charter by the President of Ghana, becoming a full university with independent degree-granting capabilities and changing its name to All Nations University. The university now has over 3000 students.

The university also has worked in collaboration with SRM Institute of Science and Technology (India).

== Programmes ==
The university offers undergraduate programmes in Oil and Gas Engineering, Biomedical Engineering, Computer Engineering, Computer Science (Hons.), Electronics, Communications Engineering, Entrepreneurship, Human Resource Management, Finance & Finance, Accounting and Marketing as well as Nursing and Biblical Studies.

The university offers the following postgraduate programmes: Doctor of Philosophy in Theology, Master of Philosophy in Theology, Master of Arts in theology, Master of Business Administration in Hospital Management, Master of Business Administration in Information Technology, Master of Philosophy in Business Administration, Master of Science in Cybersecurity, Master of Business Administration in Finance, Master of Business Administration in Marketing and Strategy, and Master of Business Administration in Accounting.

== Aerospace projects ==
All Nations University contains the Space Systems Technology Laboratory, which in 2013 launched the first satellite in Ghana. GhanaSat-1, the first satellite created in Ghana launched into space, was designed and assembled by three students from ANU. The university led a collaboration with seven other African countries to build a follow-up, GhanaSat-2.

== See also ==
- List of universities in Ghana
