= Mathew Olumide Adepoju =

Director General of NASRDA

Prof. Matthew Adepoju
- Incumbent
- Assumed office May, 2024
- Preceded by: Halilu Ahmad Shaba

Director General of National Space Research and Development Agency

Personal details
- Born: February, 1971
- Education: Yaba College of Technology; University of Lagos; University of Nottingham (MSc); University of Leicester (PhD)

Matthew Adepoju is the Director General / Chief Executive of the National Space Research and Development Agency. He was previously the Director of Strategic Space Applications Department of the agency.

== Early life and education ==
Adepoju was born in Nigeria. He attended Yaba College of Technology before continuing his studies at Lagos State University.

Adepoju later moved to the United Kingdom, where he earned a master's degree in Geographical Information Science from the University of Nottingham. He subsequently completed his doctoral studies at the University of Leicester. His research focused on the application of maps, satellite data, and space science to address real-world challenges on Earth, laying the foundation for his career in space science.

== Career ==
Adepoju began his career at Nigeria's National Space Research and Development Agency (NASRDA) in 2009 as a Chief Research Officer, where he utilized satellite imagery and geospatial data to study land use, water resources, urban development, and environmental management. His work contributed to the advancement of smart city planning in Nigeria.

From 2014 to 2022, he served as Deputy Director at NASRDA, overseeing large-scale scientific projects and coordinating teams to enhance the application of space science across the country. In 2021, he was appointed Acting Director, and in 2024, he was named Director General by the President of Nigeria, the highest leadership position in the agency. Under his tenure, NASRDA has overseen the launch of four indigenous satellites, providing critical data for flood monitoring, agricultural planning, and disaster management.

Adepoju also served as president of the Geoinformation Society of Nigeria for five years, promoting the use of geospatial and space technologies. He has collaborated with international organizations, including the United Nations and the World Bank, and has authored over 30 publications on topics such as meteorology, agriculture, urban planning, and satellite applications.

He actively supports programs aimed at equipping young people with skills in software, data analytics, artificial intelligence, and satellite technology, preparing the next generation for careers in science and technology. Adepoju is recognized across Africa and internationally for his contributions to space science and leadership in the field.. In August, 2026, has was elevated to the rank of Professor of Geoinformatics and GIS Applications by the African University of Science and Technology (AUST), Abuja.
