= Kyushu Institute of Technology =

National university in Fukuoka Prefecture, Japan

Coordinates: 33°53′39″N 130°50′21″E

- 九州工業大学
- Type: Public (National)
- Established: 1907
- President: OIE Yuji
- Location: Kitakyushu and Iizuka, Fukuoka prefecture, Japan
- Campus: Urban
- Mascot: None
- Website: www.kyutech.ac.jp

The Kyushu Institute of Technology (九州工業大学, Kyūshū Kōgyō Daigaku) is one of the 87 national universities in Japan. Located in Fukuoka Prefecture on the island of Kyushu, it is dedicated to education and research in the fields of science and technology. It is earlier abbreviated to KIT and is now officially abbreviated to Kyutech.

The founder was Matsumoto Kenjiro, second son of Yasukawa Keiichiro, and the links with the Yaskawa Electric Corporation (founded in 1915) remain strong to this day. The centenary of the opening of the Tobata campus is being celebrated in 2009, with Founder's Day on May 28, 2009.

One of its famous alumnus is "Mr. Tornado", the severe storms researcher Tetsuya "Ted" Fujita. He graduated in 1943 and was an associate professor until 1953 when he was invited to the University of Chicago.

== History ==
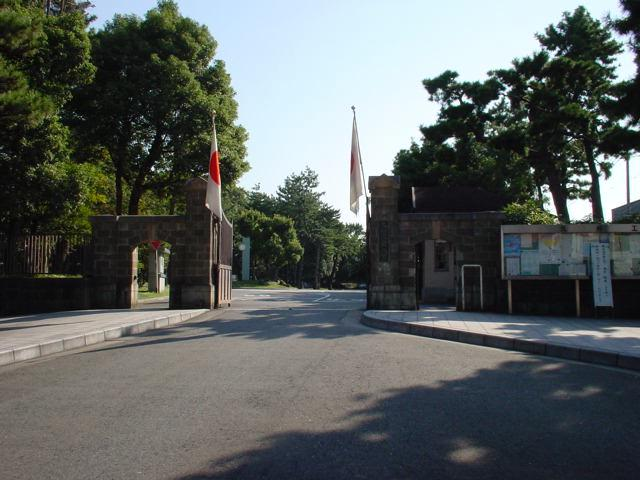
KIT Tobata campus front gate (Seimon) with the flags out on a national holiday

The university was granted government permission to be founded in 1907 as a private training school for engineers called Meiji Senmon Gakkō (Meiji Vocational School), toward the end of the Meiji period. The first campus opened its doors in Tobata in 1909, and the centenary of the university is therefore being celebrated in 2009.

KIT became a Japanese national university on May 31, 1949 and has, since April 1, 2004, been incorporated as a National University Corporation under a new law that applies to all national universities.

Despite the incorporation, which has led to increased financial independence and autonomy, KIT is still quite strictly controlled in many respects by the Japanese Ministry of Education (Monbukagakushō, or Monkashō).

In 1995, the Satellite Venture Business Laboratory was opened at Tobata campus.

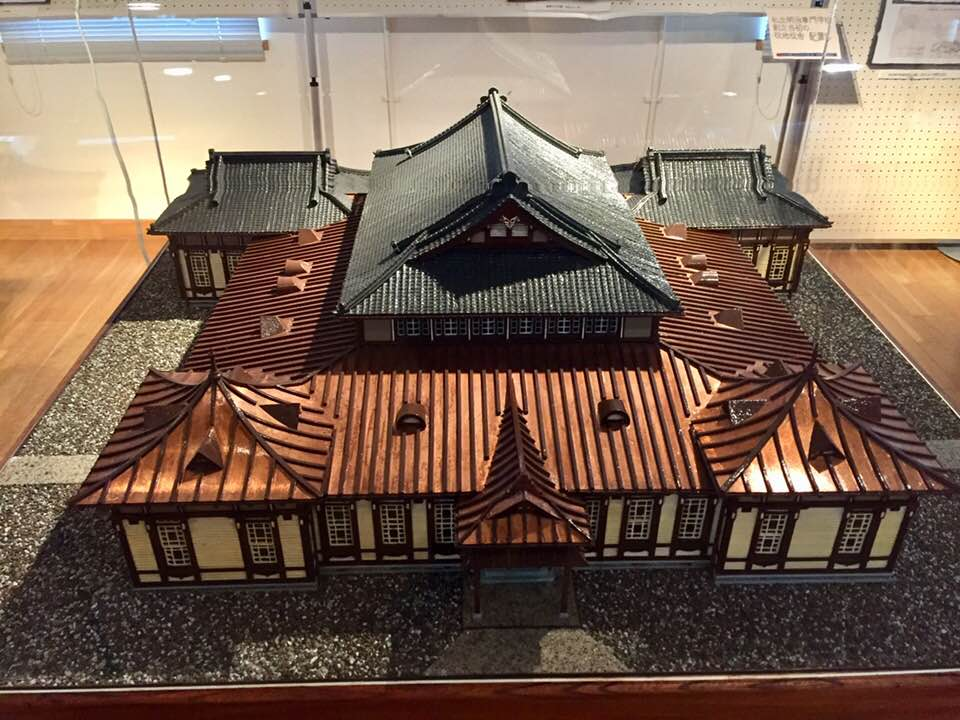
This was the first school building of what is now called Kyushu Institute of Technology. When it was built the school was called Meiji College of Technology (Meiji Senmon Gakko). It was designed by Tatsuno Kingo and the school opened in 1909.

The first school building of Meiji Senmon Gakko was made wholly of wood and designed by Tatsuno Kingo. There is also a 1/50th scale model of the building on display in the university archives on Tobata campus.

== Founding principles ==
The first president of KIT, Yamakawa Kenjiro who studied at Yale University declared that the aim of the school was to produce "gentlemen well versed in technological skills" (gijutsu ni tannō naru shikunshi). Nowadays the university aims to produce both ladies and gentlemen with these skills, and enjoys a high reputation with employers.

Founder's day is May 28. It coincides deliberately with the Battle of Tsushima of May 27 and May 28, 1905, the decisive naval battle in the Russo-Japanese War. Admiral Tōgō Heihachirō once visited KIT, and his visit is commemorated in the school's archives, as is that of Okuma Shigenobu.

== Campuses ==
KIT has three campuses. Two of these are in Kitakyushu and one is in Iizuka. All three are in Fukuoka Prefecture, Kyushu.

University rankings

Regional – Overall
- QS Asia: =362 (2025)

=== Tobata campus (Kitakyushu) ===
Faculty of Engineering, Graduate School of Engineering. This is the oldest campus, opened in 1909. It was designed by Tatsuno Kingo. It originally had three departments: Mining, Metallurgy, and Mechanical Engineering.

=== Iizuka campus ===
Faculty of Computer Science and Systems Engineering, Graduate School of Computer Science and Systems Engineering. This is the second campus, established in 1986. The first students were admitted in 1987.

=== Wakamatsu campus (Kitakyushu) ===
Graduate School of Life Science and Systems Engineering. This is the newest campus, established in April 2001.

== International partnerships ==
KIT has partnership agreements with several overseas universities, including the University of Surrey (UK), Old Dominion University (USA), and the University of Texas at El Paso (USA).

== Notable people ==
=== Alumni ===
- Tetsuya Fujita – severe storm research

=== Faculty ===
- Tatsuo Endo – professor emeritus

== See also ==
- Kagoshima University
- Kyushu Institute of Design
- Kyushu University
- Nagasaki University
- Nagoya Institute of Technology
- Tokyo Institute of Technology
- University of Kitakyushu
- Institute of Technology
