= List of Earth observation satellites =

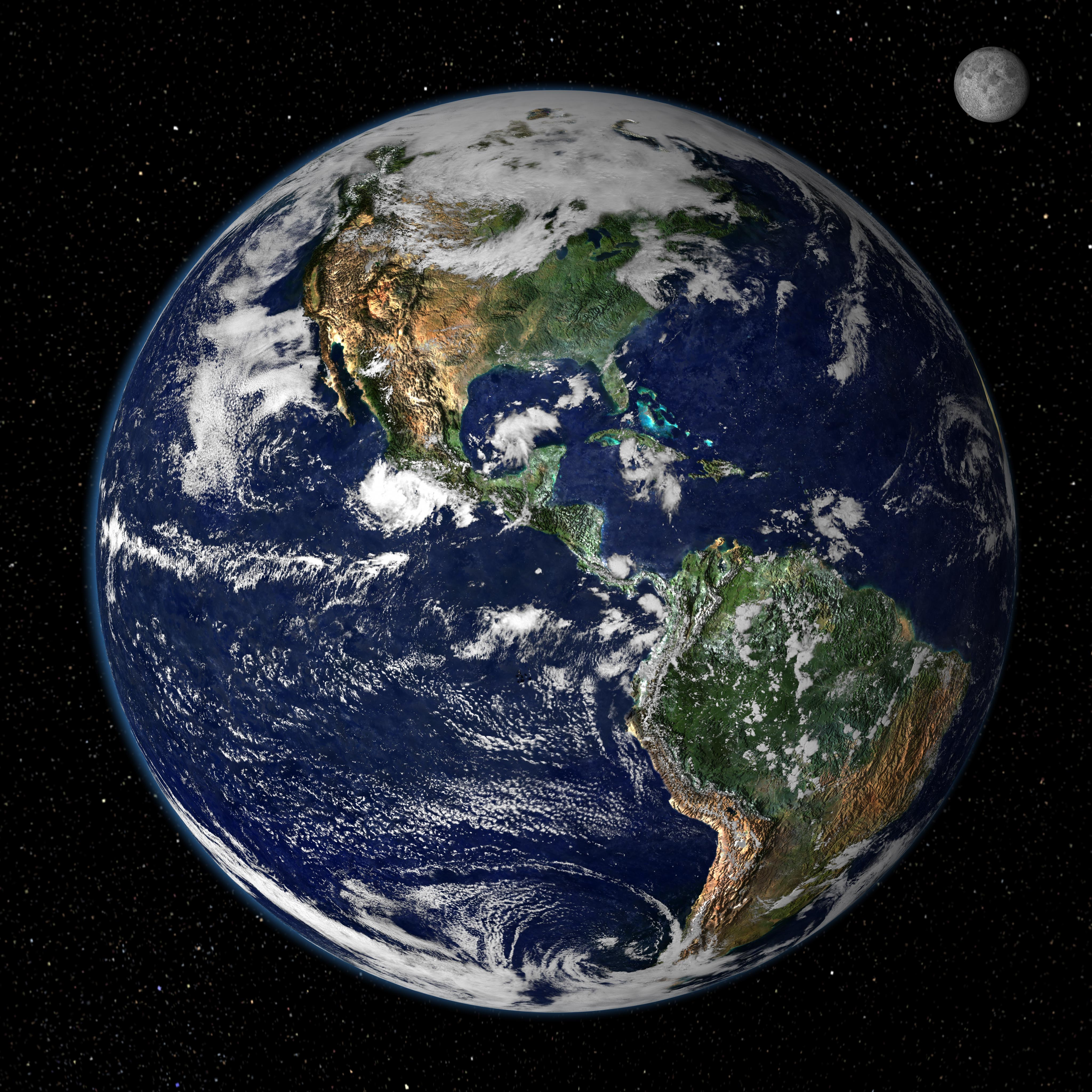
True color image of the Earth from space. This image is a composite image collected over 16 days by the MODIS sensor on NASA’s Terra satellite.

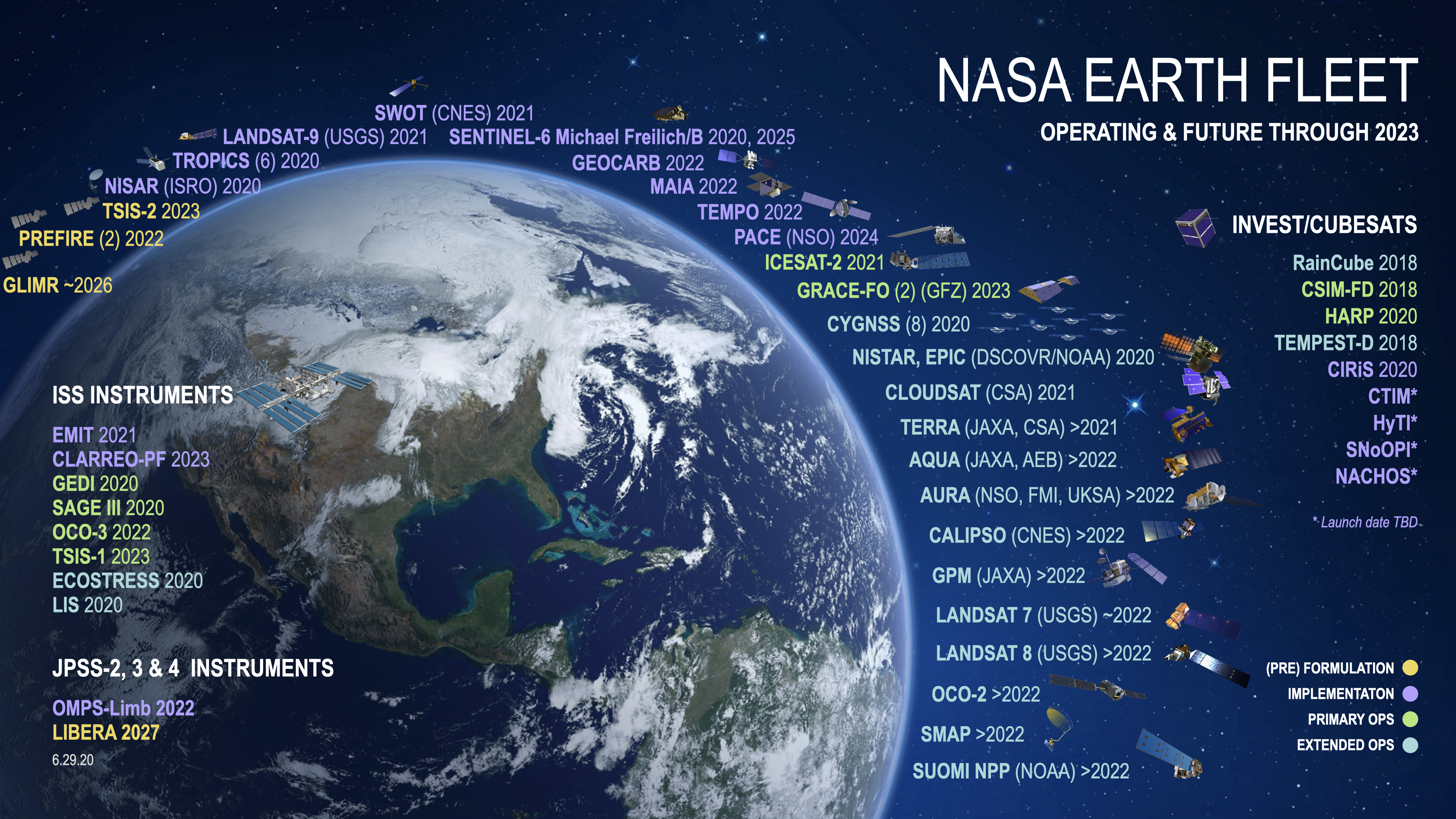
NASA Earth science satellite fleet as of September 2020, planned through 2023.

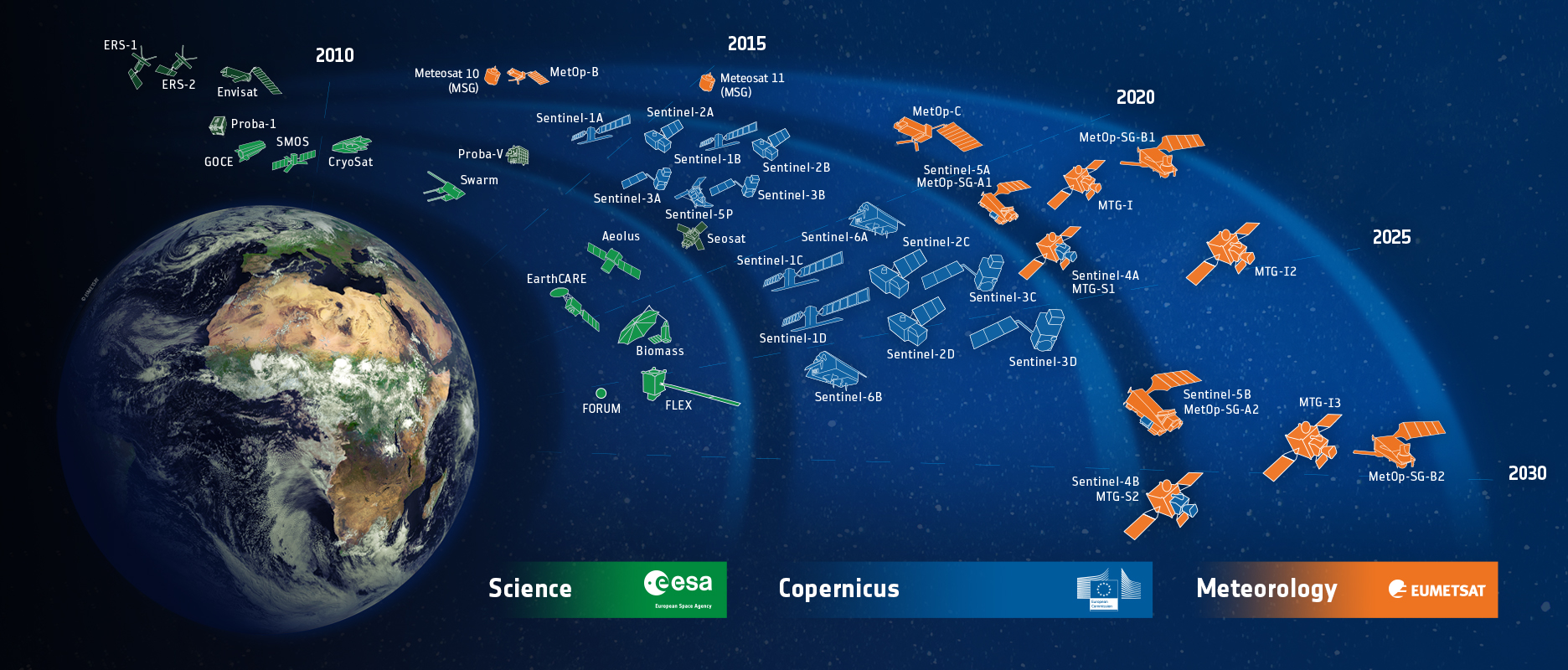
Earth observation satellite missions developed by the ESA as of 2019.

Earth observation satellites are Earth-orbiting spacecraft with sensors used to collect imagery and measurements of the surface of the earth. These satellites are used to monitor short-term weather, long-term climate change, natural disasters. Earth observations satellites provide information for research subjects that benefit from looking at Earth’s surface from above (such as meteorology, oceanography, terrestrial ecology, glaciology, atmospheric science, hydrology, geology, and many more). Types of sensors on these satellites include passive and active remote sensors. Sensors on Earth observation satellites often take measurements of emitted energy over some portion of the electromagnetic spectrum (e.g., UV, visible, infrared, microwave, or radio).

The invention of climate research through the use of satellite remote telemetry began in the 1960s through development of space probes to study other planets. During the U.S. economic decline in 1977, with much of NASA's money going toward the shuttle program, the Reagan Administration proposed to reduce spending on planetary exploration. During this time, new scientific evidence emerged from ice and sediment cores that Earth's climate had experienced rapid changes in temperature, running contrary to the previously held belief that the climate changed on a geological time scale. These changes increased political interest in gathering remote-sensing data on the Earth itself and stimulated the science of climatology.

== Classification ==
The lists below classify Earth observation satellites in two large groups: satellites operated by government agencies of one or more countries (public domain) versus commercial satellites built and maintained by companies (private domain). The satellite lifetime, between launch and reentry, is often called a satellite mission. These lists focus on currently active missions, rather than inactive retired missions or planned future missions. However, some examples of past and future satellites are included. Active, inactive, or planned classifications are relevant as of 2021.

== Satellites launched by governmental agencies ==
=== Active government satellites ===
| Name | Agency | Launch (Note: For constellations of multiple satellites, launch year is listed here as the maiden launch year for the first satellite in the series.) | Description |
|---|---|---|---|
| ALOS-2 | JAXA | 2014 | |
| ALOS-4 | JAXA | 2024 | |
| Alsat-2A and 2B | Algerian Space Agency (ASAL) | 2016 | |
| Amazônia-1 | Brazil’s National Institute for Space Research (INPE) | 2021 | |
| Aqua | NASA | 2002 | Carries six instruments to observe interactions among the four spheres for Earth's systems: oceans, land, atmosphere, and biosphere. |
| ASNARO-2 | JAXA | 2018 | |
| Aura | NASA | 2004 | Studies earth's ozone, air quality, and climate though observation of composition, chemistry, and dynamics of the atmosphere. |
| Badr-B | Pakistan’s Space and Upper Atmosphere Research Commission (SUPARCO) | 2001 | |
| Biomass | ESA | 2025 | Comprehensive measurements of global forest biomass |
| BKA | National Academy of Sciences of Belarus | 2012 | |
| Cartosat-1 | Indian Space Research Organization (ISRO) | 2005 | |
| Cartosat-2A and 2B | ISRO | 2007 | |
| Cartosat-2C, 2D, 2E, and 2F | ISRO | 2016 | |
| Cartosat-3 | ISRO | 2019 | |
| CBERS-4 | Brazil’s National Institute for Space Research (INPE) and China National Space Administration (CNSA) | 2014 | |
| Chollian 1, 2A, and 2B | KARI | 2010 | Also known as Communication, Ocean and Meteorological Satellites (COMS). Used for communication, oceanography, and meteorological observation. |
| CloudSat | NASA | 2006 | Uses radar to measure the altitude and properties of clouds. |
| COSMO-SkyMed 1 to 4 | Italian Space Agency (ASI) | 2007 | Used for defense and security assurance in Italy and other countries, seismic hazard analysis, environmental disaster monitoring, and agricultural mapping. |
| CryoSat-2 | ESA | 2010 | |
| CYGNSS | NASA | 2016 | Cyclone Global Navigation Satellite System. |
| DSCOVR | NASA | 2015 | Deep Space Climate Observatory. Designed to study the Sun-lit side of Earth from the L1 Lagrange point. |
| DubaiSat-1 and 2 | Mohammed bin Rashid Space Centre (MBRSC) | 2009 | |
| EarthCARE | ESA and JAXA | 2024 | Designed to study clouds and aerosols. |
| Elektro-L No. 1, 2, and 3 | Russia's Roscosmos | 2011 | |
| Fengyun 2D to 4A | China Meteorological Administration | 2006 | Translated from Chinese, the word Fengyun means "wind cloud." Series 3 satellites are Sun-synchronous and series 2 and 4 satellites are geosynchronous. |
| Formosat-5 | Taiwan’s National Space Organization (NSPO) | 2017 | |
| Gaofen-2 | CNSA | 2014 | |
| Gaofen-3 | CNSA | 2016 | |
| GOES-16 and 17 | NASA | 2016 | Geostationary Operational Environmental Satellite. Collects weather observations. See also: List of GOES satellites. |
| Gokturk-1 | Turkish Ministry of National Defense | 2016 | Used for mapping and planning, landcover survey, geology, ecosystem monitoring, disaster management, environmental control, coastal zone management, and water resources. |
| Gokturk-2 | Turkish Ministry of National Defense | 2012 | Used for mapping and planning, landcover survey, geology, ecosystem monitoring, disaster management, environmental control, coastal zone management, and water resources. |
| GPM | NASA and JAXA | 2014 | Global Precipitation Measurement (GPM) Core Observatory. Used to study rainfall and snowfall. |
| GRACE-FO | NASA | 2018 | Gravity and climate. The mission will track changes in global sea levels, glaciers, and ice sheets, as well as large lake and river water levels, and soil moisture. |
| GOSAT | JAXA | 2009 | Greenhouse Gases Observing Satellite. The first precise carbon dioxide observing satellite and precursor to OCO-2. |
| Himawari 8 and 9 | Japan Meteorological Agency | 2014 | Similar to NASA's GOES satellites. |
| ICESat-2 | NASA | 2018 | Measures ice sheet height changes for climate change diagnoses. |
| IMS-1 | ISRO | 2008 | |
| ISS | NASA, Roscosmos, JAXA, ESA, and CSA | 1998 | The International Space Station (ISS) has long been used as a central satellite platform for other sensors, including Earth observation sensors. For example: LIS, SAGE III, TSIS-I, ECOSTRESS, GEDI, OCO-3, Diwata-1, and HICO. |
| Jason-3 | NASA and CNES | 2016 | Radar altimeter used to monitor ocean surface height. |
| KhalifaSat | MBRSC | 2018 | Also known as DubaiSat-3. |
| KOMPSAT-2 | KARI | 2006 | Korean Multi-purpose Satellite-2. Also known as Arirang-2. |
| KOMPSAT-3, 3A, and 5 | KARI | 2012 | Korean Multi-purpose Satellite-3, 3A, and 5. Also known as Arirang-3, 3A, and 5. |
| LAGEOS-1 and 2 | NASA | 1976 | LAGEOS 1 launched in 1976 and LAGEOS 2 launched in 1992. Used as an orbiting benchmark for geodynamical studies. |
| Landsat-8 | NASA and USGS | 2013 | Follow on to Landsat-7 with improved imager OLI and thermal sensor TIRS. |
| Landsat-9 | NASA and USGS | 2021 | Follow on to Landsat-8 with OLI sensor and thermal sensor TIRS-2. Landsat-9 will extend the Landsat program to maintain the time series of these types of data. |
| Megha-Tropiques | CNES and ISRO | 2011 | |
| Meteor-M No. 1 and 2 | Roscosmos | 2009 | |
| Meteosat 8 | EUMETSAT | 2002 | Also known as MSG 1. |
| MetOp A, B, and C | NASA, ESA, and NOAA | 2006 | Meteorological Operational satellite. Part of the Polar Operational Environmental Satellites (POES) program. |
| Mohammed VI-A and VI-B | Arianespace and Morocco | 2017 | See also: Vega flight VV11 and Vega flight VV13 |
| NigComSat-1R | NASRDA | 2009 | DFH-4 satellite and replacement for the failed NigComSat-1 |
| NigeriaSat-1 and 2 | NASRDA | 2003 | Part of the worldwide Disaster Monitoring Constellation System |
| NOAA-15, 18, and 19 | NASA, ESA, and NOAA | 1998 | Part of the Polar Operational Environmental Satellites (POES) program. |
| NOAA-20 | NASA and NOAA | 2017 | Part of the Joint Polar Satellite System (JPSS) program. |
| Oceansat-2 | ISRO | 2009 | |
| OCO-2 | NASA | 2014 | Orbiting Carbon Observatory 2. Part of the A-Train. The second precise carbon dioxide observing satellite after GOSAT. |
| PACE | NASA | 2024 | Plankton, Aerosol, Cloud, and ocean Ecosystem measures hyperspectral and polarimetric characteristics of solar radiation reflected off Earth’s surface and atmosphere. |
| PakTES-1A | SUPARCO | 2018 | |
| Paz | Spain's Instituto Nacional de Técnica Aeroespacial | 2018 | |
| Pleiades 1A and 1B | CNES | 2011 | |
| PRISMA | Italian Space Agency (ASI) | 2019 | PRecursore IperSpettrale della Missione Applicativa, in English: Hyperspectral Precursor of the Application Mission. |
| PROBA-V | ESA | 2013 | Continues the traditional Vegetation (the "V" in PROBA-V) products that began with the SPOT satellites. |
| PRSS-1 | SUPARCO | 2018 | Pakistan Remote Sensing Satellite 1. |
| RCM | CSA | 2019 | RADARSAT Constellation Mission. |
| RADARSAT-2 | CSA | 2007 | C-band synthetic aperture radar (SAR-C) satellite. |
| RASAT | TÜBITAK-UZAY | 2011 | |
| Resourcesat-1 and 2 | ISRO | 2003 | |
| Resurs-P No.1 and 2 | Roscosmos | 2013 | |
| SAOCOM | CONAE | 2018 | |
| SARAL | ISRO | 2013 | |
| Sentinel-1A, B, C, and D | ESA | 2014 | Constellation of two, each satellite carries C-SAR sensor. Part of the Copernicus Programme. |
| Sentinel-2A, B, and C | ESA | 2015 | Constellation of three, each satellite carries MSI sensor for high spatial resolution imaging. Part of the Copernicus Programme. |
| Sentinel-3A and B | ESA | 2016 | Constellation of two, each satellite carries sensors OLCI and SLSTR. Slightly coarser spatial resolution and more spectral bands than Sentinel-2. Part of the Copernicus Programme. |
| Sentinel-6A and B | ESA | 2020 | Continuing the legacy of the Jason series missions, Sentinel-6/Jason-CS will extend the records of sea level (sea surface height) and provide information for operational oceanography, marine meteorology, and climate studies. |
| SMAP | NASA | 2015 | Soil Moisture Active Passive. Measures soil moisture and its freeze/thaw state, which enhance understanding of processes that link water, energy, and carbon cycles to extend the capabilities of weather and climate models. Radar payload failed in July 2015, leaving a radiometer as the primary instrument of the mission. |
| Suomi NPP | NASA | 2011 | Part of the Joint Polar Satellite System (JPSS) program. |
| SWOT | CNES and NASA | 2022 | |
| TanDEM-X | DLR | 2010 | |
| Terra | NASA | 1999 | Carries five instruments to observe the state of the atmosphere, land, and oceans, as well as their interactions with solar radiation and with one another. |
| TerraSAR-X | DLR | 2007 | |
| THEOS | GISTDA | 2008 | Also known as Thaichote. |
| TIMED | NASA | 2001 | Thermosphere, Ionosphere, Mesosphere, Energetics, and Dynamics. |
| VNREDSat-1A | VAST | 2013 | The Vietnamese Natural Resources, Environment and Disaster Monitoring Satellite. |
| VRSS-1 and 2 | ABAE | 2012 | The Venezuelan Remote Sensing Satellite. |
| Sentinel-5 Precursor (S5P) | ESA | 2017 | |
| SMOS | ESA | 2009 | |

=== Inactive government satellites ===
| Name | Agency | Launch | Description |
|---|---|---|---|
| ACRIMSAT | NASA | 1999 | Studied sun's UV to infrared energy output. Contact was lost in December 2013. |
| ADEOS-II | NASDA, NASA, and CNES | 2002 | |
| Arirang-1 | KARI | 1999 | |
| BelKA | National Academy of Sciences of Belarus | 2006 | Failed to orbit. |
| BILSAT-1 | TÜBITAK-UZAY | 2003 | Retired 2006 |
| EO-1 | NASA | 2001 | Earth Observing 1. Carried land-imaging technology and demonstrated new instruments and spacecraft systems for future missions. Retired 2017. |
| Envisat | ESA | 2002 | Envisat stands for "Environmental satellite." Carried sensors such as MERIS and SCIAMACHY. Retired 2012. |
| Formosat-2 | NSPO | 2004 | Retired 2016 |
| GLORY | NASA | 2011 | Designed to study aerosols, including black carbon, in addition to solar irradiance. Failed launch. |
| GOES-12 to 15 | NASA | 2001 | Monitored weather for NOAA. |
| GRACE-1 and 2 | NASA and German Space Agency | 2002 | Gravity Recovery And Climate Experiment. Tracked changes in global sea levels, glaciers, and ice sheets, as well as large lake and river water levels, and soil moisture. Retired 2017. |
| ICESat | NASA | 2003 | Measured ice sheet height changes for climate change diagnoses. |
| Jason-1 and 2 | NASA and CNES | 2001 | Radar altimeters used to monitor ocean surface height. |
| Landsat-7 | NASA and USGS | 1999 | Images Earth's land surfaces and coastal areas with global coverage at high spatial resolution. Retired 2025. |
| Lapan-TUBsat | LAPAN | 2007 | Also known as LAPAN A1. Microsatellite based on DLR-Tubsat. Retired 2013. |
| Maya-1 | Philippine Space Agency | 2018 | Retired 2020. |
| Munin | SNSA | 2000 | Retired 2001. |
| OrbView-2 | NASA | 1997 | Also known as Seastar. Carried sensor SeaWiFS. Monitored the color of Earth's oceans. Retired 2010. |
| QuikSCAT | NASA | 1997 | Monitored weather using bursts of microwaves which measure wind speeds. |
| Resurs-DK No.1 | Roscosmos | 2006 | |
| RISAT-1 | ISRO | 2012 | Retired 2016. |
| SAC-D | NASA and CONAE | 2011 | Carried the Aquarius instrument, which measured ocean salinity (salt concentration) which improves knowledge of heat transport and storage in the ocean. Mission ended June 2015 due to satellite power supply failure. |
| TOPEX/Poseidon | NASA and CNES | 1992 | Part of NASA's Earth-Sun System Missions. Retired 2006. |
| TRMM | NASA and JAXA | 1997 | Carried five instruments which uses radar and sensors of visible infrared light to closely monitor precipitation. |
| UARS | NASA | 1991 | Upper Atmosphere Research Satellite. Part of NASA's Earth-Sun System Missions. Retired 2005. |
| Vanguard 2 | NRL | 1959 | Vanguard 2E. The first weather satellite, designed to measure cloud cover. Part of Project Vanguard. |

=== Planned government satellites ===
| Name | Agency | Description | Launch date |
|---|---|---|---|
| Göktürk-3 | Turkish Ministry of National Defense | Planned high resolution SAR satellite. | 2030 |
| SABIA-Mar | AEB and CONAE | The mission objective is to study the oceanic biosphere, its changes over time, and how it is affected by and reacts to human activity. | |
| HydroGNSS | ESA | Two identical satellites sensing Galileo and GPS signals reflected by Earth's surface for improving the knowledge of Earth’s hydrological cycle. | 2025 |
| ALTIUS | ESA | Monitoring the distribution and evolution of stratospheric ozone | 2026 |
| FLEX | ESA | FLuorescence EXplorer mission will globally monitor steady-state chlorophyll fluorescence in terrestrial vegetation. | 2026 |
| FORUM | ESA | Far-infrared Outgoing Radiation Understanding and Monitoring; a mission to measure Earth's outgoing radiation emissions across the entire far-infrared electromagnetic spectrum. | 2027 |
| Harmony | ESA | A pair of synthetic aperture radar satellites that aims to further the study of ocean circulation patterns, glacial dynamics, and changes in land-surface topography. | 2029 |
| Wivern | ESA | The first space mission to measure winds inside clouds. | 2032 |

== Private or commercial satellites ==
=== Active commercial satellites ===
| Name | Owner/Agency | Launch |
|---|---|---|
| Aleph-1/ÑuSat | Satellogic | 2016 |
| CO3D-1 to 4 | Airbus Defence and Space / CNES | 2025 |
| Disaster Monitoring Constellation | DMC International Imaging | 2009 |
| EROS A and B | ImageSat International | 2000 |
| Flock-1 Constellation | Planet | 2014 |
| GeoEye-1 | Vantor | 2008 |
| GRUS-1A to E | Axelspace | 2018 |
| ICEYE | ICEYE | 2018 |
| Jilin-1 (Hyperspectral) | Chang Guang Satellite Technology | 2019 |
| Jilin-1 (Optical | Chang Guang Satellite Technology | 2015 |
| NovaSAR-S1 | UK Space Agency and Surrey Satellite Technology | 2018 |
| PlanetScope-2 | Planet | 2016 |
| Pleiades Neo 3 | Airbus Defence and Space | 2021 |
| Pleiades Neo 4 | Airbus Defence and Space | 2021 |
| SkySat-1 to 3 | Planet | 2013 |
| SkySat-4 to 7 | Planet | 2016 |
| SkySat-8 to 13 | Planet | 2017 |
| SPOT 6 and 7 | EADS Astrium Azercosmos, and CNES | 2012 |
| SuperView-1 | Beijing Space View Technology | 2018 |
| TripleSat (UK-DMC 3) | DMC International Imaging | 2015 |
| Unicorn-2 Constellation | Alba Orbital | 2025 |
| Vivid-i 1 to 5 | Earth-i | 2018 |
| WorldView-1 | Vantor | 2007 |
| WorldView-2 and 3 | Vantor | 2009 |

=== Inactive commercial satellites ===
| Name | Owner/Agency | Launch | End of mission |
|---|---|---|---|
| IKONOS | DigitalGlobe (Maxar) | 1999 | 2015 |
| QuickBird | DigitalGlobe (Maxar) | 2001 | 2015 |
| RapidEye | Planet | 2008 | 2020 |
| WorldView-4 | DigitalGlobe (Maxar) | 2016 | 2019 |

=== Planned commercial satellites ===
| Name | Owner/Agency | Launch | Description |
|---|---|---|---|
| Pléiades Neo Next | Airbus Defence and Space | 2027 | Based on Airbus S950 Optical product |

== See also ==
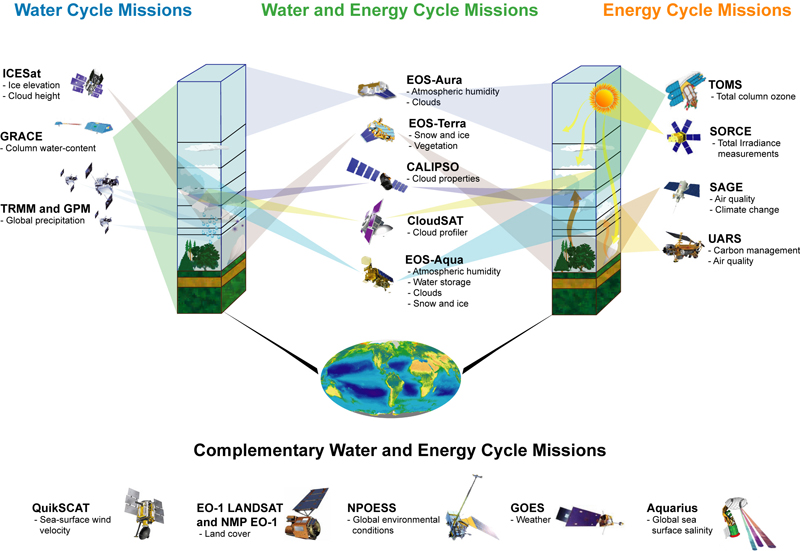
NASA Water and Energy Cycle satellite missions as of 2006.

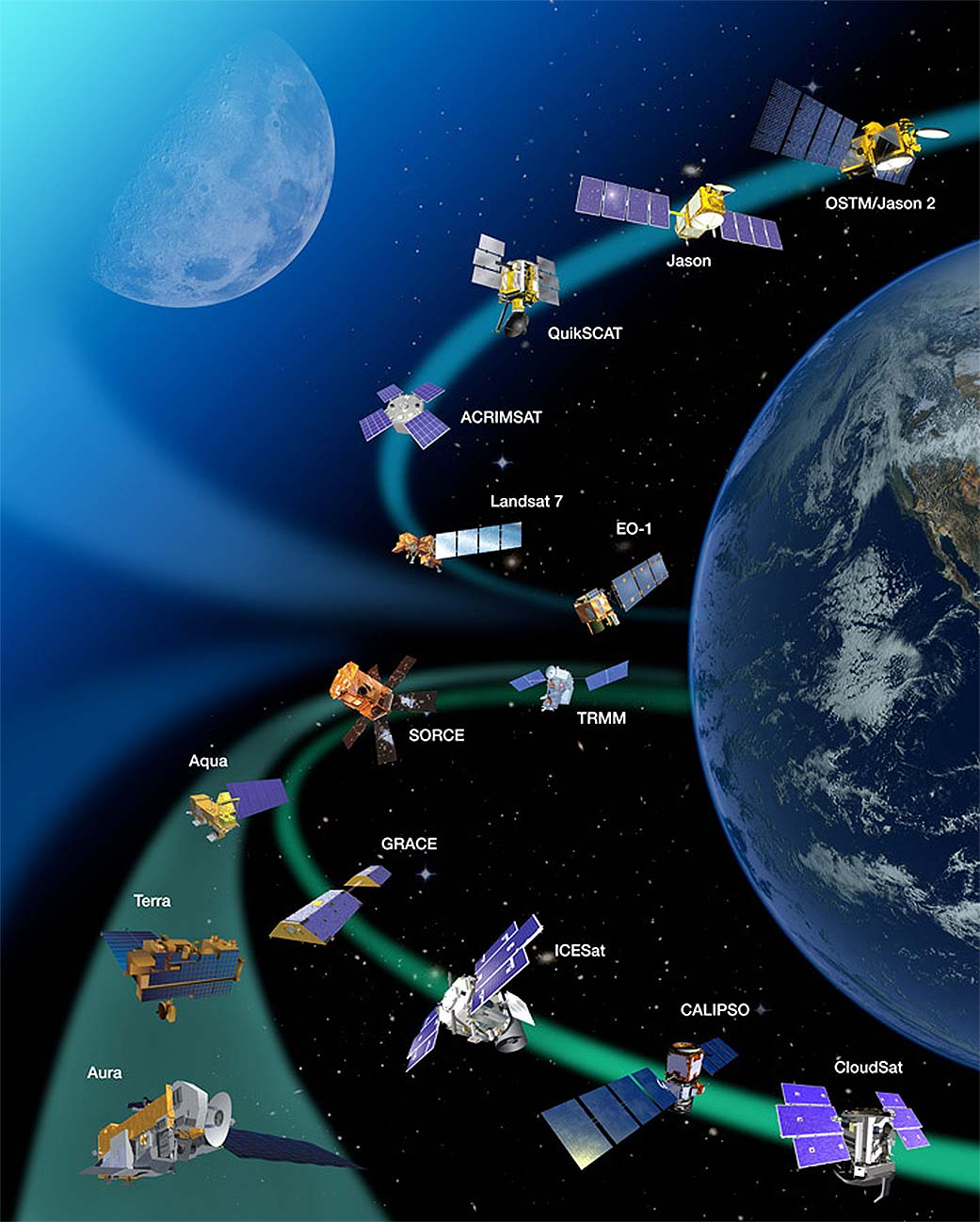
NASA Earth science satellites as of 2017.

- Committee on Earth Observation Satellites
- Earth observation satellite
- First images of Earth from space
- Orbital spaceflight
- Imaging satellites
- Satellite
- Satellite imagery
- Timeline of Earth science satellites
- Uncrewed space mission

Related lists:

- List of government space agencies
- List of orbits
- List of satellites in geosynchronous orbit
- List of uncrewed spacecraft by program
