= Göktürk (disambiguation) =

Göktürks are a branch of Turks who formed an empire between 551 and 744.

Göktürk may also refer to:

== Places ==
- Göktürk, Istanbul a neighborhood within Eyüp district of Istanbul, Turkey
- Göktürk, Gülnar a village in Gülnar district of Mersin Province, Turkey

== Satellites ==
- Göktürk-1
- Göktürk-2
- Göktürk-3

== Other ==
- First and Second Turkic Khaganate (or Göktürk Khaganate) the empire which was founded by the Göktürks
- WASP-52b, an exoplanet named Göktürk
