= GOK =

GOK, Gok, or Gök may refer to:

== People ==
- Abdurrahman Gök (born 1980), Turkish journalist
- Azim Gök (born 1996), Iranian association football player
- Emin Gök (born 1988), Turkish volleyball player
- Levent Gök (born 1959), Turkish politician
- GOK Ajayi (1931–2014), Nigerian lawyer
- Gok Wan (born 1974), British fashion consultant, author, and television presenter

== Geography ==
- Gök River, a river in Turkey
- Gok State (2015–2020), a defunct state in South Sudan

== Other uses ==
- GOK, New York Stock Exchange listing for Geokinetics, a defunct seismic data services company
- GOK, IATA code for Guthrie–Edmond Regional Airport, in Oklahoma, United States
- GoK, common abbreviation for the Government of Kenya
- Gök Medrese (disambiguation), two Islamic educational institutions in Turkey

== See also ==
- Göktürk (disambiguation)
- Gök Nerede, studio album by Turkish pop and rock singer Mabel Matiz
- Yau gok, traditional dumplings in Cantonese cuisine
