= Imece =

Imece can refer to:

- Imece, Turkish communal work
- İMECE, Turkish Earth observation satellite
- International Mechanical Engineering Congress and Exposition (IMECE), the main annual conference and exhibition of the American Society of Mechanical Engineers
