= ABAE =

Abae or ABAE may refer to:

- Abae, an ancient town of Greece
- Amateur Boxing Association of England, now England Boxing
- Bolivarian Agency for Space Activities (Spanish: Agencia Bolivariana para Actividades Espaciales), the space agency of Venezuela
