= İMECE =

Earth observation satellite

- Mission type: Earth observation
- COSPAR ID: 2023-054A
- SATCAT no.: 56178
- Website: https://uzay.tubitak.gov.tr/en/imece/
- Mission duration: 5 years

Spacecraft properties
- Manufacturer: TÜBİTAK Space Technologies Research Institute (TÜBİTAK UZAY)
- Launch mass: 800 kg (1,800 lb)

Start of mission
- Launch date: 15 April 2023, 06:48 UTC

Orbital parameters
- Reference system: Geocentric
- Regime: Sun-synchronous
- Altitude: 680 km (420 mi)

Main Camera
- Collecting area: 13.9 km × 16.2 km (8.6 mi × 10.1 mi)
- Resolution: Panchromatic (PAN): 0.99 m (3 ft 3 in); Multispectral (MSI): 3.96 m (13.0 ft)

İMECE is an Earth observation satellite designed and developed by TÜBİTAK Space Technologies Research Institute (TÜBİTAK UZAY) and produced in Turkey to provide high resolution imagery.

The satellite was launched in April 2023.

== Project ==
The İMECE Satellite Systems Infrastructure Project was included in the 2013 investment program of the Ministry of Development. With the experience of BİLSAT-1, RASAT and Göktürk-2, the investment program supported "İMECE Satellite Subsystems Development Project" was initiated in order to establish the infrastructure required for the domestic development of satellite subsystems that can be used in satellites of submeter-class precision resolution electro-optical satellite camera and communication systems. It aims to develop star tracker, Sun sensor, electric propulsion system, payload data record compression formatting unit and new generation flight computer in high resolution imaging satellites and transform it into economic value.

The İMECE Satellite Project, supported by Scientific and Technological Research Council of Turkey (TÜBİTAK), started in January 2017. In June 2020, the assembly integration activities of the spacecraft's thermal structural efficiency module was completed, and tests for the vibration on the spacecraft started. The assembly activities of the flight module followed those tests.

The satellite has been launched on 15 April 2023 on a SpaceX's Falcon 9 Block 5 rocket as part of the Transporter-7 ridershare mission.

== Characteristics ==
The spacecraft is manufactured by TÜBİTAK Space Technologies Research Institute (TÜBİTAK UZAY) at the Turkish Aerospace Industries (TUSAŞ) facility in Kahramankazan, Ankara.

Projected for a mission duration of five years, the spacecraft has a mass of 800 kg (1,800 lb). It will be at 680 km (420 mi) on a Sun-synchronous geocentric orbit. It will have an image area of 13.9 km × 16.2 km (8.6 mi × 10.1 mi) in one frame with an image resolution of Panchromatic (PAN): 0.99 m (3 ft 3 in), Multispectral (MSI): 3.96 m (13.0 ft).
