= Yaogan =

Chinese military reconnaissance satellite program

- 遥感卫星; Yáogǎn Wèixīng
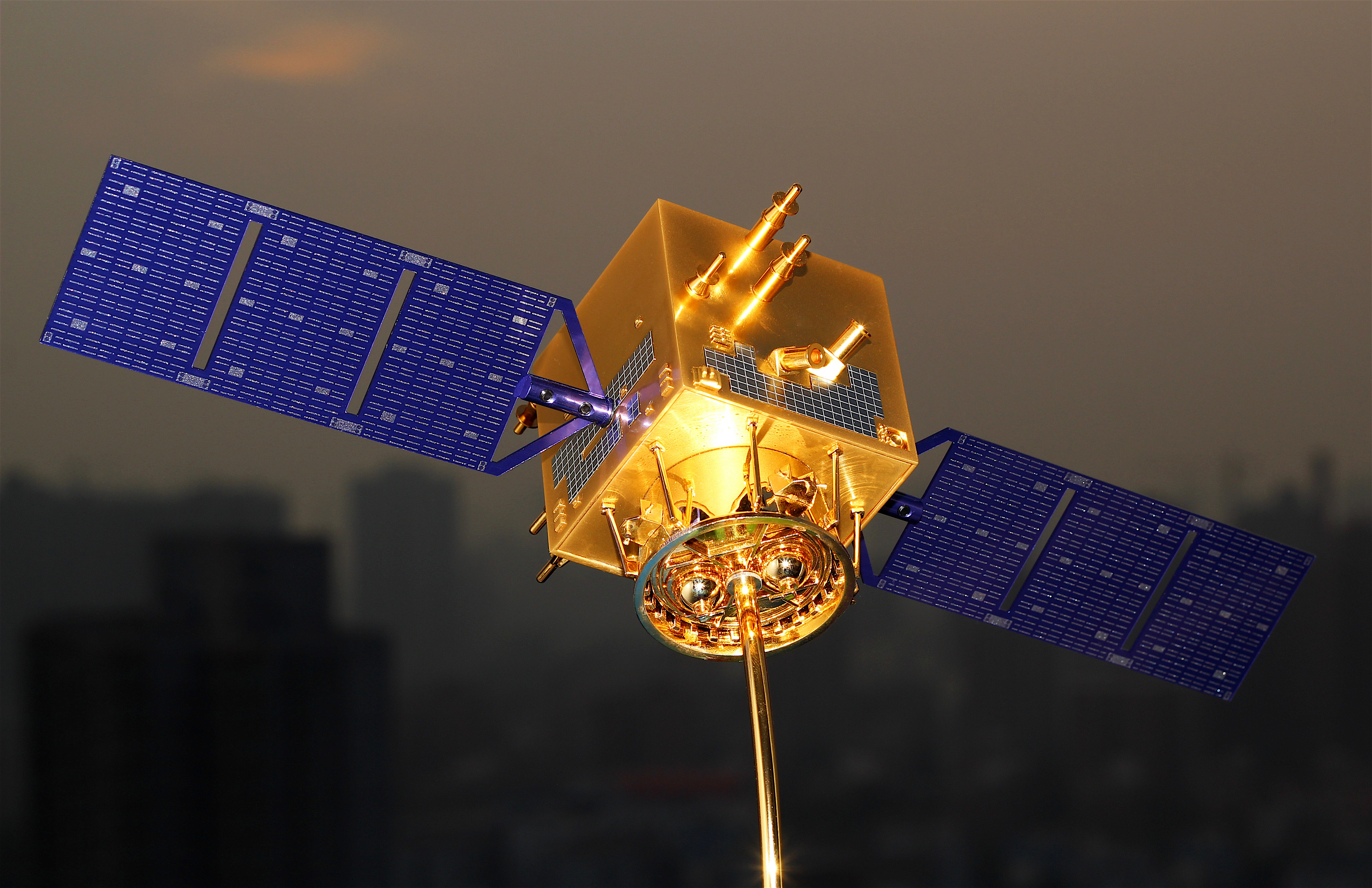
- VRSS-1 satellite based on the Jianbing-6 class of Yaogan satellites

Program overview
- Country: People's Republic of China
- Organization: SAST; CAST
- Purpose: Reconnaissance
- Status: Active

Program history
- First flight: 26 April 2006
- Successes: 149
- Failures: 1
- Launch sites: TSLC; JSLC; XSLC; WSLS

Vehicle information
- Launch vehicles: Long March 2C; Long March 2D; Long March 4B; Long March 4C; Long March 5; Long March 6A; Long March 7A

Yaogan (simplified Chinese: 遥感卫星; traditional Chinese: 遙感衞星; pinyin: Yáogǎn Wèixīng; lit. 'Remote Sensing Satellite') is the designation used by the People's Republic of China to refer to its military reconnaissance satellites. Yaogan satellites are largely known to primarily support the People's Liberation Army's Strategic Support Force (PLASSF), formerly the Aerospace Reconnaissance Bureau of the Second Department of the General Staff. The Yaogan program is the successor to the Fanhui Shi Weixing (FSW) recoverable reconnaissance satellite program but, unlike its predecessor, includes a variety of classes utilizing various means of remote sensing such as optical reconnaissance, synthetic-aperture radar (SAR), and electronic intelligence (ELINT) for maritime surveillance. Yaogan satellites have been launched from the Taiyuan Satellite Launch Center (TSLC) in Shanxi province, the Jiuquan Satellite Launch Center (JSLC) in Inner Mongolia, Xichang Satellite Launch Center (XSLC) in Sichuan province and the Wenchang Space Launch Site (WSLS) in Hainan province.

Although individual Yaogan satellites are often referred to by their number (e.g. Yaogan-18), Chinese military reconnaissance satellites are typically categorized by their military Jianbing designation. Jianbing (尖兵) translates to "point soldier", "vanguard", or "pioneer" and entered use in satellite designations with China's first series of reconnaissance satellites, FSW-0, as the Jianbing-1 series. The first Yaogan satellite, Yaogan 1, is one of three Jianbing-5 (JB-5) series satellites following the final FSW-3 satellites of the Jianbing-4 (JB-4) series. Because Jianbing designations are secret and only Yaogan numbers are officially used, the Jianbing designations for later classes still remains unknown to the public.

== Classes ==
=== Synthetic-aperture radar ===
Chinese synthetic-aperture radar (SAR, Chinese: 合成孔径雷达; pinyin: héchéng kǒngjìng léidá) sensor development began in the late 1970s under the Electronic Research Institute of the Chinese Academy of Sciences (CAS) resulting in the testing of the first airborne X-band mono-polarization SAR collection in 1981. By 1994, CAS had introduced its first operational, real-time airborne SAR system to monitor flooding and transmit collected data to ground stations. Preliminary research and development of China's first-generation, space-based SAR system began sometime in the 1980s with development beginning in full in 1991. High-resolution, space-based SAR collection has been ambitiously pursued by the PLA for its potential contributions to all-weather targeting of naval forces in the Taiwan Strait.

Jianbing-5 series satellites (abbreviated "JB-5") are China's first space-based SAR satellites and the first satellites in the Yaogan program. The development and production of the Jianbing-5 series of satellites have been entirely funded by the People's Liberation Army (PLA) as the ability to penetrate the seemingly constant cloud cover present in the southern provinces of Tibet, Sichuan, Yunnan, Guangxi, Guangdong, and Hainan challenges traditional optical collection in those regions. The PLA also believes that in a potential war SAR collection capabilities will be vital to information dominance by mapping terrain, identifying targets through cloud cover, rain, fog, and dust, and potentially monitoring enemy submarines in shallow waters or targets in subterranean facilities. In May 1995, the finalized designs were approved and development began in earnest with the approval of the State Science & Technology Committee (SSTC) and Commission for Science, Technology, and Industry for National Defense (COSTIND). The CAS Institute of Electronics built the SAR instruments onboard Jianbing-5 satellites, the craft itself designed by the Shanghai Academy of Spaceflight Technology (SAST) which also develops the Long March 4B launch vehicle. Other developers involved in the project are the China Academy of Space Technology (CAST or 5th Space Academy) 501st and 504th Institutes, the China Electronics Technology Group's (CETC) Nanjing Research Institute of Electronics Technology (known also as the 14th Institute), the Southwest Institute of Electronic Equipment (SWIEE or 29th Institute), and the Beijing University of Aeronautics & Astronautics (BUAA). SAST is also the developer of the Feng Yun series of weather satellites.

Jianbing-5 satellites are built by SAST and launched from the Taiyuan Satellite Launch Center (TSLC) and provide military analysts synthetic-radar imagery purportedly at a spatial resolution as sharp as 5 meters over the L-band (1–2 GHz). JB-5 satellites have been confirmed to have an electronic motor-powered solar panel which can be expanded and contracted by the ground control station. Jianbing-5 class satellites have a reported mass of 2,700 kilograms, orbital inclination of approximately 97° in Sun-synchronous orbit, and with two operational satellites enjoys a twice daily revisit rate at a 45° viewing angle. Between April 2006 and August 2010, China launched three Jianbing-5 SAR satellites, the last two of which remain in operation from TSLC. Yaogan 1, launched in April 2006, reportedly broke up around 4 February 2010 almost four years after its launch. Due to the small number of pieces and low orbital speeds, the breakup was likely due to an internal explosion, not a high-speed collision.

Yaogan 29, launched in November 2015 into a similar orbit, appears to be the modernized successor to the Jianbing-5 series of SAR satellites.

The Jianbing-7 class of Yaogan satellites, with military designations beginning with "JB-7", are Chinese military radar reconnaissance satellites built by SAST with an orbital period of 97 minutes and a side-looking radar system designed by the CAS's Institute of Electronics. As of July 2022, China has launched four Jianbing-7 radar satellites with the first launched in April 2009 and the latest in November 2014 with a mass of 1,200 kilograms (2,600 pounds) from TSLC. The third satellite of the Jianbing-7 class, launched in October 2013, had its orbit lowered from April to July 2020 and consequently underwent an uncontrolled decay reentering the atmosphere in 2021.

Although the Jianbing designation is still unknown for the latest class of SAR reconnaissance satellites, China has launched three satellites of a modernized successor class to the Jianbing-5 and Jianbing-7 classes of SAR reconnaissance satellites. This class uses the same orbit as the Jianbing-5 class but likely has a different design according to published illustrations. The second satellite of this class, Yaogan 33, failed to reach orbit in May 2019. Its likely replacement, Yaogan 33R, was launched a year and a half later but used a different launch site (Jiuquan instead of Taiyuan) and was placed into a higher orbit (682 km × 686 km).

=== Electro-optical ===
The Jianbing-6 class of Yaogan satellites, with military designations beginning with "JB-6", provides the Chinese military optical imaging capabilities to complement the Jianbing-5 class's SAR reconnaissance capabilities. It has been reported that satellites of the Jianbing-6 class have a resolution of 0.8 meters. Jianbing-6 satellites were developed by CAST based on the CAST2000 satellites bus originally developed by the China SpaceSat Company Ltd. Jianbing-6 satellites image the Earth with a spatial resolution of approximately 1.5 meters and transmit them via X-band receiving telemetry, tracking, and command signals over the S-band. As of July 2022, China individually launched six Yaogan satellites of the Jianbing-6 class into low Earth orbit (LEO) with the first satellite launched in May 2006 and the latest in May 2016. The Bolivarian Agency for Space Activities signed a US$140 million deal with China Great Wall Industries Co. Ltd. to launch the Venezuelan Remote-Sensing Satellite 1 (VRSS-1) in May 2011 marking China's first export of a reconnaissance satellite. VRSS-1 was based on the design of Jianbing-6 satellites and was launched on 29 September 2012 from JSLC.

The Jianbing-9 class of Yaogan satellites, with military designations beginning with "JB-9" provides the Chinese military with optical imaging capabilities, likely as a successor to the Jianbing-6 class, though it orbits at a much higher altitude of 1,200 km, indicating that satellites of this class are lower-resolution mapping and area surveillance satellites. The optical payload of Yaogan satellites in the Jianbing-9 class was developed by the Changchun Institute of Optics, Fine Mechanics, and Physics. China has launched five individual Yaogan satellites of the Jianbing-9 class with the first launched in December 2009 and the latest in August 2015 from TSLC.

The Jianbing-10 class of Yaogan satellites, with military designations beginning with "JB-10" provides the Chinese military with optical imaging capabilities. Believed to also be based on the CAST2000 satellite bus, like those of the Jianbing-6 class, three Jianbing-10-class satellites built by CAST and carrying an optical imaging system from the Xian Institute of Optics and Precision Mechanics have been individually launched with the first launched in December 2008 and the reported last of the class in September 2014 from TSLC.

The Jianbing-11 class of Yaogan satellites, with military designations beginning with "JB-11" provides the Chinese military with optical imaging capabilities. As of May 2022, China has launched two individually launched Yaogan satellites of the Jianbing-11 class with the first launched in May 2012 and the latest in November 2015.

The Jianbing-12 class of Yaogan satellites, with military designations beginning with "JB-12", are military optical reconnaissance satellites.

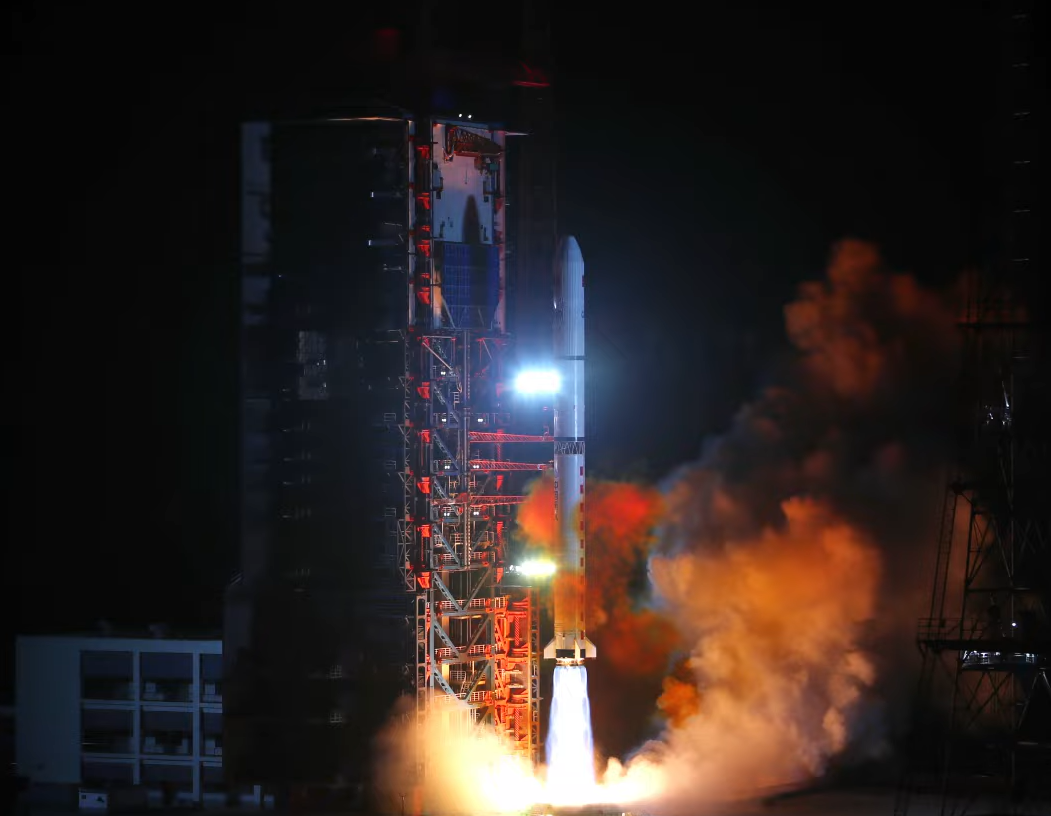
Launch of Yaogan-36 on 27 November 2022

=== Electronic intelligence ===
In response to Taiwanese President Lee Teng-hui's visit to the United States in 1995, the PRC initiated the Third Taiwan Strait Crisis conducting high-profile missile tests, amphibious landing drills, and troop staging in Fujian Province, across the strait from the island of Taiwan. The United States government responded to the PRC's escalation by deploying the largest American show of force since the Vietnam War including sending two American carrier battle groups which effectively forced the PRC to deescalate. Since then, the PLA has committed to design and field advanced anti-ship missile systems including the Dong Feng 21 and has deployed nearly sixty maritime surveillance satellites using electronic intelligence (ELINT) to locate, identify, and track adversarial vessels to support targeting.

The Jianbing-8 class of Yaogan satellites, with military designations beginning with "JB-8", consist of one primary satellite and two sub-satellites launched in triplets. These satellites reportedly perform an ocean or naval surveillance mission similar to those of the United States' Naval Ocean Surveillance System (NOSS or PARCAE) despite the Chinese state-media's insistence they were designed to "conduct electromagnetic environmental monitoring and related technology tests". The triplet groups likely fly in a loose formation to locate radio emitters using the difference in time of arrival of radio signals at the different satellites. Jianbing-8 satellites are based on the CAST2000 satellites bus and have a mass of 200 kilograms (440 pounds) and an orbital period of 107.10 minutes in LEO. As of May 2022, there have been nine launches of Jianbing-8 triplets (twenty-seven total satellites) from JSLC with the first triplet launching in March 2010 and the latest in March 2021.

The CX-5 or Chuangxin-5 (simplified Chinese: 创新; traditional Chinese: 創新; pinyin: Chuàngxīn; lit. 'Innovation') class of satellites, the only known Yaogan satellites to have been launched at Xichang SLC, are still largely shrouded in secrecy and their purpose is only speculated to be ELINT by nature of their triplet launches, similar to satellites of the Jianbing-8 class.

== Satellites ==
Name	Military designation	Launch	Function	Orbit	Orbital Apsis	Inclination	SCN	COSPARID	Contractor	Launcher	Launch site	Status
Yaogan 1	JB-5-1	26 April 2006	SAR	SSO	635 km × 637 km	97.9°	29092	2006-015A	SAST	Long March 4C	TSLC	Decayed
Yaogan 2	JB-6-1	25 May 2007	EO	SSO	639 km × 663 km	97.9°	31490	2007-019A	CAST	Long March 2D	JSLC	Operational
Yaogan 3	JB-5-2	11 November 2007	SAR	SSO	635 km × 637 km	97.8°	32289	2007-055A	SAST	Long March 4C	TSLC	Operational
Yaogan 4	JB-6-2	1 December 2008	EO	SSO	642 km × 660 km	97.9°	33446	2008-061A	CAST	Long March 2D	JSLC	Operational
Yaogan 5	JB-10-1	15 December 2008	EO	SSO	494 km × 501 km	97.3°	33456	2008-064A	CAST	Long March 4B	TSLC	Decayed
Yaogan 6	JB-7-1	22 April 2009	SAR	SSO	518 km × 519 km	97.6°	34839	2009-021A	SAST	Long March 2C	TSLC	Decayed
Yaogan 7	JB-6-3	9 December 2009	EO	SSO	630 km × 666 km	97.8°	36110	2009-069A	CAST	Long March 2D	JSLC	Operational
Yaogan 8	JB-9-1	15 December 2009	EO	SSO	1200 km × 1212 km	100.5°	36121	2009-072A	SAST	Long March 4C	TSLC	Operational
Yaogan 9A	JB-8-1A	5 March 2010	ELINT	LEO	781.2 km × 1412.8 km	63.4°	36413	2010-009A	CAST	Long March 4C	JSLC	Operational
Yaogan 9B	JB-8-1B	5 March 2010	ELINT	LEO	781.2 km × 1412.6 km	63.4°	36414	2010-009B	CAST	Long March 4C	JSLC	Operational
Yaogan 9C	JB-8-1C	5 March 2010	ELINT	LEO	780.6 km × 1413.2 km	63.4°	36415	2010-009C	CAST	Long March 4C	JSLC	Operational
Yaogan 10	JB-5-3	9 August 2010	SAR	SSO	629 km × 627 km	97.8°	36834	2010-038A	SAST	Long March 4C	TSLC	Operational
Yaogan 11	JB-6-4	22 September 2010	EO	SSO	670 km × 625 km	98.0°	37165	2010-047A	CAST	Long March 2D	JSLC	Operational
Yaogan 12	JB-10-2	9 November 2011	EO	SSO	479 km × 495 km	97.3°	37875	2011-066B	CAST	Long March 4B	TSLC	Operational
Yaogan 13	JB-7-2	29 November 2011	SAR	SSO	502 km × 504 km	97.4°	37941	2011-072A	SAST	Long March 2C	TSLC	Decayed
Yaogan 14	JB-11-1	10 May 2012	EO	SSO	471 km × 474 km	97.3°	38257	2012-021A	CAST	Long March 4B	TSLC	Operational
Yaogan 15	JB-9-2	29 May 2012	EO	SSO	1198 km × 1204 km	100.2°	38354	2012-029A	SAST	Long March 4C	TSLC	Operational
Yaogan 16A	JB-8-2A	25 November 2012	ELINT	LEO	855.0 km × 1338.9 Km	63.4°	39011	2012-066A	CAST	Long March 4C	JSLC	Operational
Yaogan 16B	JB-8-2B	25 November 2012	ELINT	LEO	855.1 km × 1338.9 km	63.4°	39012	2012-066B	CAST	Long March 4C	JSLC	Operational
Yaogan 16C	JB-8-2C	25 November 2012	ELINT	LEO	855.1 km × 1338.9 km	63.4°	39013	2012-066C	CAST	Long March 4C	JSLC	Operational
Yaogan 17A	JB-8-3A	1 September 2013	ELINT	LEO	867.2 km × 1326.8 km	63.4°	39239	2013-046A	SAST	Long March 4C	JSLC	Operational
Yaogan 17B	JB-8-3B	1 September 2013	ELINT	LEO	867.3 km × 1326.9 km	63.4°	39240	2013-046B	SAST	Long March 4C	JSLC	Operational
Yaogan 17C	JB-8-3C	1 September 2013	ELINT	LEO	866.6 km × 63.4 km	63.4°	39241	2013-046C	SAST	Long March 4C	JSLC	Operational
Yaogan 18	JB-7-3	29 October 2013	SAR	SSO	509 km × 514 km	97.5°	39363	2013-059A	SAST	Long March 2C	TSLC	Decayed
Yaogan 19	JB-9-3	20 November 2013	EO	SSO	1119 km × 1204 km	100.4°	39410	2013-065A	SAST	Long March 4C	TSLC	Operational
Yaogan 20A	JB-8-4A	9 August 2014	ELINT	LEO	893.5 km × 1300.5 km	63.4°	40109	2014-047A	CAST	Long March 4C	JSLC	Operational
Yaogan 20B	JB-8-4B	9 August 2014	ELINT	LEO	893.5 km × 1300.5 km	63.4°	40110	2014-047B	CAST	Long March 4C	JSLC	Operational
Yaogan 20C	JB-8-4C	9 August 2014	ELINT	LEO	893.4 km × 1300.6 km	63.4°	40111	2014-047C	CAST	Long March 4C	JSLC	Operational
Yaogan 21	JB-10-3	8 September 2014	EO	SSO	481 km × 492 km	97.4°	40143	2014-053A	CAST	Long March 4B	TSLC	Operational
Yaogan 22	JB-9-4	20 October 2014	EO	SSO	1198 km × 1207 km	100.3°	40275	2014-063A	SAST	Long March 4C	TSLC	Operational
Yaogan 23	JB-7-4	14 November 2014	SAR	SSO	511 km × 513 km	97.3°	40305	2014-071A	SAST	Long March 2C	TSLC	Decayed
Yaogan 24	JB 6-5	20 November 2014	EO	SSO	629 km × 654 km	97.9°	40310	2014-072A	CAST	Long March 2D	JSLC	Operational
Yaogan 25A	JB-8-5A	10 December 2014	ELINT	LEO	912.0 km × 1282.0 km	63.4°	40338	2014-080A	CAST	Long March 4C	JSLC	Operational
Yaogan 25B	JB-8-5B	10 December 2014	ELINT	LEO	912.0 km × 1282.0 km	63.4°	40339	2014-080B	CAST	Long March 4C	JSLC	Operational
Yaogan 25C	JB-8-5C	10 December 2014	ELINT	LEO	912.0 km × 1282.1 km	63.4°	40340	2014-080C	CAST	Long March 4C	JSLC	Operational
Yaogan 26	JB-12-1	27 December 2014	EO	SSO	482 km × 488 km	97.4°	40362	2014-088A	CAST	Long March 4B	TSLC	Operational
Yaogan 27	JB-9-5	27 August 2015	EO	SSO	1201 km × 1214 km	100.4°	40878	2015-040A	SAST	Long March 4C	TSLC	Operational
Yaogan 28	JB-11-2	8 November 2015	EO	SSO	476 km × 490 km	97.3°	41026	2015-064A	CAST	Long March 4B	TSLC	Operational
Yaogan 29	JB-?-1	26 November 2015	SAR	SSO	635 km × 636 km	97.9°	41038	2015-069A	SAST	Long March 4C	TSLC	Operational
Yaogan 30	JB-6-6	15 May 2016	EO	SSO	634 km × 664 km	98.0°	41473	2016-029A	CAST	Long March 2D	JSLC	Operational
Yaogan 30-1A	CX-5	29 September 2017	ELINT	LEO	600.9 km × 603.7 km	35.0°	42945	2017-058A	IAMCAS	Long March 2C	XSLC	Operational
Yaogan 30-1B	CX-5	29 September 2017	ELINT	LEO	599.8 km × 604.8 km	35.0°	42946	2017-058B	IAMCAS	Long March 2C	XSLC	Operational
Yaogan 30-1C	CX-5	29 September 2017	ELINT	LEO	598.0 km × 606.4 km	35.0°	42947	2017-058C	IAMCAS	Long March 2C	XSLC	Operational
Yaogan 30-2A	CX-5	24 November 2017	ELINT	LEO	600.3 km × 604.2 km	35.0°	43028	2017-075A	IAMCAS	Long March 2D	XSLC	Operational
Yaogan 30-2B	CX-5	24 November 2017	ELINT	LEO	598.9 km × 605.6 km	35.0°	43029	2017-075B	IAMCAS	Long March 2D	XSLC	Operational
Yaogan 30-2C	CX-5	24 November 2017	ELINT	LEO	599.8 km × 604.9 km	35.0°	43030	2017-075C	IAMCAS	Long March 2D	XSLC	Operational
Yaogan 30-3A	CX-5	25 December 2017	ELINT	LEO	599.4 km × 605.1 km	35.0°	43081	2017-085A	IAMCAS	Long March 2C	XSLC	Operational
Yaogan 30-3B	CX-5	25 December 2017	ELINT	LEO	598.2 km × 606.0 km	35.0°	43082	2017-085B	IAMCAS	Long March 2C	XSLC	Operational
Yaogan 30-3C	CX-5	25 December 2017	ELINT	LEO	598.6 km × 605.9 km	35.0°	43083	2017-085C	IAMCAS	Long March 2C	XSLC	Operational
Yaogan 30-4A	CX-5	25 January 2018	ELINT	LEO	597.7 km × 606.9 km	35.0°	43170	2018-011A	IAMCAS	Long March 2C	XSLC	Operational
Yaogan 30-4B	CX-5	25 January 2018	ELINT	LEO	600.3 km × 604.3 km	35.0°	43171	2018-011B	IAMCAS	Long March 2C	XSLC	Operational
Yaogan 30-4C	CX-5	25 January 2018	ELINT	LEO	600.3 km × 604.3 km	35.0°	43172	2018-011C	IAMCAS	Long March 2C	XSLC	Operational
Yaogan 30-5A	CX-5	25 July 2019	ELINT	LEO	598.7 km × 606.0 km	35.0°	44449	2019-045A	IAMCAS	Long March 2C	XSLC	Operational
Yaogan 30-5B	CX-5	25 July 2019	ELINT	LEO	595.8 km × 608.7 km	35.0°	44450	2019-045B	IAMCAS	Long March 2C	XSLC	Operational
Yaogan 30-5C	CX-5	25 July 2019	ELINT	LEO	601.5 km × 603.1 km	35.0°	44451	2019-045C	IAMCAS	Long March 2C	XSLC	Operational
Yaogan 30-6A	CX-5	24 March 2020	ELINT	LEO	598.7 km × 605.7 km	35.0°	45460	2020-021A	IAMCAS	Long March 2C	XSLC	Operational
Yaogan 30-6B	CX-5	24 March 2020	ELINT	LEO	600.0 km × 604.6	35.0°	45461	2020-021B	IAMCAS	Long March 2C	XSLC	Operational
Yaogan 30-6C	CX-5	24 March 2020	ELINT	LEO	601.0 km × 603.5 km	35.0°	45462	2020-021C	IAMCAS	Long March 2C	XSLC	Operational
Yaogan 30-7A	CX-5	26 October 2020	ELINT	LEO	602.0 km × 602.6 km	35.0°	46807	2020-076A	IAMCAS	Long March 2C	XSLC	Operational
Yaogan 30-7B	CX-5	26 October 2020	ELINT	LEO	600.2 km × 604.3 km	35.0°	46808	2020-076B	IAMCAS	Long March 2C	XSLC	Operational
Yaogan 30-7C	CX-5	26 October 2020	ELINT	LEO	597.9 km × 606.6 km	35.0°	46809	2020-076C	IAMCAS	Long March 2C	XSLC	Operational
Yaogan 30-8A	CX-5	6 May 2021	ELINT	LEO	599.1 km × 605.5 km	35.0°	48423	2021-039A	IAMCAS	Long March 2C	XSLC	Operational
Yaogan 30-8B	CX-5	6 May 2021	ELINT	LEO	598.9 km × 605.7 km	35.0°	48424	2021-039B	IAMCAS	Long March 2C	XSLC	Operational
Yaogan 30-8C	CX-5	6 May 2021	ELINT	LEO	600.8 km × 603.8 km	35.0°	48425	2021-039C	IAMCAS	Long March 2C	XSLC	Operational
Yaogan 30-9A	CX-5	18 June 2021	ELINT	LEO	598.9 km × 605.6 km	35.0°	48860	2021-055A	IAMCAS	Long March 2C	XSLC	Operational
Yaogan 30-9B	CX-5	18 June 2021	ELINT	LEO	599.0 km × 605.5 km	35.0°	48861	2021-055B	IAMCAS	Long March 2C	XSLC	Operational
Yaogan 30-9C	CX-5	18 June 2021	ELINT	LEO	598.6 km × 605.9 km	35.0°	48863	2021-055D	IAMCAS	Long March 2C	XSLC	Operational
Yaogan 30-10A	CX-5	19 July 2021	ELINT	LEO	598.7 km × 606.0 km	35.0°	49026	2021-065A	IAMCAS	Long March 2C	XSLC	Operational
Yaogan 30-10B	CX-5	19 July 2021	ELINT	LEO	591.8 km × 604.1 km	35.0°	49027	2021-065B	IAMCAS	Long March 2C	XSLC	Operational
Yaogan 30-10C	CX-5	19 July 2021	ELINT	LEO	601.7 km × 603.0 km	35.0°	49028	2021-065C	IAMCAS	Long March 2C	XSLC	Operational
Yaogan 31A	JB-8 6A	10 April 2018	ELINT	LEO	980.4 km × 1213.5 km	63.4°	43275	2018-034A	CAST	Long March 4C	JSLC	Operational
Yaogan 31B	JB-8 6B	10 April 2018	ELINT	LEO	980.4 km × 1213.5 km	63.4°	43276	2018-034B	CAST	Long March 4C	JSLC	Operational
Yaogan 31C	JB-8 6C	10 April 2018	ELINT	LEO	980.4 km × 1213.5 km	63.4°	43277	2018-034C	CAST	Long March 4C	JSLC	Operational
Yaogan 31D	JB-8 6D	29 January 2021	ELINT	LEO	1054.6 km × 1139.3 km	63.4°	47532	2021-007A	CAST	Long March 4C	JSLC	Operational
Yaogan 31E	JB-8 6E	29 January 2021	ELINT	LEO	1054.4 km × 1139.6 km	63.4°	47533	2021-007B	CAST	Long March 4C	JSLC	Operational
Yaogan 31F	JB-8 6F	29 January 2021	ELINT	LEO	1058.4 km × 1142.6 km	63.4°	47536	2021-007C	CAST	Long March 4C	JSLC	Operational
Yaogan 31G	JB-8 6G	24 February 2021	ELINT	LEO	1053.9 km × 1140.1 km	63.4°	47691	2021-014A	CAST	Long March 4C	JSLC	Operational
Yaogan 31H	JB-8 6H	24 February 2021	ELINT	LEO	1063.3 km	63.4°	47692	2021-014B	CAST	Long March 4C	JSLC	Operational
Yaogan 31J	JB-8 6J	24 February 2021	ELINT	LEO	1053.7 km × 1140.2 km	63.4°	47695	2021-014C	CAST	Long March 4C	JSLC	Operational
Yaogan 31K	JB-8 6K	13 March 2021	ELINT	LEO	1063.2 km × 1140.9 km	63.4°	47855	2021-020B	CAST	Long March 4C	JSLC	Operational
Yaogan 31L	JB-8 6L	13 March 2021	ELINT	LEO	1063.2 km × 1140.9 km	63.4°	47855	2021-020C	CAST	Long March 4C	JSLC	Operational
Yaogan 31M	JB-8 6M	13 March 2021	ELINT	LEO	1055.5 km × 1138.4 km	63.4°	47857	2021-020D	CAST	Long March 4C	JSLC	Operational
Yaogan 32A	Unknown	9 October 2018	EO	SSO	700.2 km × 702.3 km	98.1°	43642	2018-077A	CAST	Long March 2C/YZ-1S	JSLC	Operational
Yaogan 32B	Unknown	9 October 2018	EO	SSO	700.3 km × 702.1 km	98.1°	43643	2018-077B	CAST	Long March 2C/YZ-1S	JSLC	Operational
Yaogan 32-2A	Unknown	3 November 2021	SIGINT	SSO	700.6 km × 702.8 km	98.1°	49383	2021-099A	Unknown	Long March 2C/YZ-1S	JSLC	Operational
Yaogan 32-2B	Unknown	3 November 2021	SIGINT	SSO	700.8 km × 702.7 km	98.1°	49384	2021-099B	Unknown	Long March 2C/YZ-1S	JSLC	Operational
Yaogan 33	JB-?-2	22 May 2019	SAR	(Launch Failure)					SAST	Long March 4C	TSLC	Failed
Yaogan 33R	JB-?-3	27 December 2020	SAR	SSO	683 km × 686 km	98.3°	47302	2020-103A	SAST	Long March 4C	JSLC	Operational
Yaogan 33-02	Unknown	2 September 2022	SAR	SSO	688 km × 680 km	98.18°	53698	2022-106A	SAST	Long March 4C	JSLC	Operational
Yaogan 33-03	Unknown	6 September 2023	SAR	SSO	703.2km×701.9km	98.2°	57797	2023-136A	SAST	Long March 4C	JSLC	Operational
Yaogan 33-04	Unknown	26 September 2023	SAR	SSO	695.6km×692.3km	98.1°	57958	2023-149A	SAST	Long March 4C	JSLC	Operational
Yaogan 34	Unknown	30 April 2021	EO	LEO	1083 km × 1105 km	63.4°	48340	2021-037A	SAST	Long March 4C	JSLC	Operational
Yaogan 34-2	Unknown	17 March 2022	EO	LEO	1083 km × 1105 km	63.38°	52084	2022-027A	SAST	Long March 4C	JSLC	Operational
Yaogan 34-3	Unknown	15 November 2022	Unknown	LEO	1,080.2 km × 1,103.6 km	63.4°	54249	2022-154A	SAST	Long March 4C	JSLC	Operational
Yaogan 34-4	Unknown	31 March 2023	Unknown	LEO	1088.4 km × 105.3 km	63.4°	56157	2023-048A	SAST	Long March 4C	JSLC	Operational
Yaogan 35A	Unknown	6 November 2021	Unknown	LEO	501.2 km × 506.4 km	35.0°	49390	2021-101A	CAST; SAST	Long March 2D	XSLC	Operational
Yaogan 35B	Unknown	6 November 2021	Unknown	LEO	499.8 km × 507.8 km	35.0°	49391	2021-101B	CAST; SAST	Long March 2D	XSLC	Operational
Yaogan 35C	Unknown	6 November 2021	Unknown	LEO	459.3 km × 463.5 km	35.0°	49392	2021-101C	CAST; SAST	Long March 2D	XSLC	Operational
Yaogan 35 02-A	Unknown	23 June 2022	ELINT	LEO	499 km × 508 km	35.0°	52907	2022-068A	CAST; SAST	Long March 2D	XSLC	Operational
Yaogan 35 02-B	Unknown	23 June 2022	ELINT	LEO	498 km × 509 km	35.0°	52908	2022-068B	CAST; SAST	Long March 2D	XSLC	Operational
Yaogan 35 02-C	Unknown	23 June 2022	ELINT	LEO	496 km × 506 km	35.0°	52909	2022-068C	CAST; SAST	Long March 2D	XSLC	Operational
Yaogan 35 03-A	Unknown	29 July 2022	ELINT	LEO	499 km × 508.6 km	35.0°	53316	2022-088A	CAST; SAST	Long March 2D	XSLC	Operational
Yaogan 35 03-B	Unknown	29 July 2022	ELINT	LEO	496.6 km × 511.2 km	35.0°	53317	2022-088B	CAST; SAST	Long March 2D	XSLC	Operational
Yaogan 35 03-C	Unknown	29 July 2022	ELINT	LEO	497.5 km × 510.4 km	35.0°	53318	2022-088C	CAST; SAST	Long March 2D	XSLC	Operational
Yaogan 35 04-A	Unknown	19 August 2022	ELINT	LEO	491 km × 502 km	35.0°	53522	2022-100A	CAST; SAST	Long March 2D	XSLC	Operational
Yaogan 35 04-B	Unknown	19 August 2022	ELINT	LEO	490 km × 502 km	35.0°	53523	2022-100B	CAST; SAST	Long March 2D	XSLC	Operational
Yaogan 35 04-C	Unknown	19 August 2022	ELINT	LEO	488 km × 500 km	35.0°	53524	2022-100C	CAST; SAST	Long March 2D	XSLC	Operational
Yaogan 35 05-A	Unknown	6 September 2022	ELINT	LEO	502 km × 491 km	35.0°	53760	2022-109A	CAST; SAST	Long March 2D	XSLC	Operational
Yaogan 35 05-B	Unknown	6 September 2022	ELINT	LEO	501 km × 488 km	35.0°	53761	2022-109B	CAST; SAST	Long March 2D	XSLC	Operational
Yaogan 35 05-C	Unknown	6 September 2022	ELINT	LEO	501 km × 489 km	35.0°	53762	2022-109C	CAST; SAST	Long March 2D	XSLC	Operational
Yaogan 36A	Unknown	26 September 2022	Unknown	LEO	499 km × 486 km	35.0°	53943	2022-120A	CAST; SAST	Long March 2D	XSLC	Operational
Yaogan 36B	Unknown	26 September 2022	Unknown	LEO	499 km × 488 km	35.0°	53946	2022-120B	CAST; SAST	Long March 2D	XSLC	Operational
Yaogan 36C	Unknown	26 September 2022	Unknown	LEO	498 km × 485 km	35.0°	53947	2022-120C	CAST; SAST	Long March 2D	XSLC	Operational
Yaogan 36 02-A	Unknown	14 October 2022	ELINT	LEO	499 km × 487 km	35.0°	54042	2022-133A	CAST; SAST	Long March 2D	XSLC	Operational
Yaogan 36 02-B	Unknown	14 October 2022	ELINT	LEO	498 km × 486 km	35.0°	54043	2022-133B	CAST; SAST	Long March 2D	XSLC	Operational
Yaogan 36 02-C	Unknown	14 October 2022	ELINT	LEO	498 km × 485 km	35.0°	54044	2022-133C	CAST; SAST	Long March 2D	XSLC	Operational
Yaogan 36 03-A	Unknown	27 November 2022	ELINT	LEO	501.3 km 511.2 km	35.0°	54372	2022-160A	CAST; SAST	Long March 2D	XSLC	Operational
Yaogan 36 03-B	Unknown	27 November 2022	ELINT	LEO	493.6 km × 505.5 km	35.0°	54373	2022-160B	CAST; SAST	Long March 2D	XSLC	Operational
Yaogan 36 03-C	Unknown	27 November 2022	ELINT	LEO	500.9 km 509.7 km	35.0°	54374	2022-160C	CAST; SAST	Long March 2D	XSLC	Operational
Yaogan 36 04-A	Unknown	14 December 2022	ELINT	LEO	500.3 km × 511.2 km	35.0°	54746	2022-171A	CAST; SAST	Long March 2D	XSLC	Operational
Yaogan 36 04-B	Unknown	14 December 2022	ELINT	LEO	495.8 km × 507.0 km	35.0°	54747	2022-171B	CAST; SAST	Long March 2D	XSLC	Operational
Yaogan 36 04-C	Unknown	14 December 2022	ELINT	LEO	502.2 km × 510.3 km	35.0°	54748	2022-171C	CAST; SAST	Long March 2D	XSLC	Operational
Yaogan 36 05-A	Unknown	26 July 2023	ELINT	LEO	508.7 km × 498.6 km	35.0°	57452	2023-106A	CAST; SAST	Long March 2D	XSLC	Operational
Yaogan 36 05-B	Unknown	26 July 2023	ELINT	LEO	508.2 km × 498.0 km	35.0°	57454	2023-106C	CAST; SAST	Long March 2D	XSLC	Operational
Yaogan 36 05-C	Unknown	26 July 2023	ELINT	LEO	507.2 km × 495.0 km	35.0°	57456	2023-106E	CAST; SAST	Long March 2D	XSLC	Operational
Yaogan 37	Unknown	13 January 2023	Unknown	LEO	518.6 km × 526.3 km	43.2°	55244	2023-006C	SAST	Long March 2D	JSLC	Operational
Yaogan 39-01A	Unknown	31 August 2023	ELINT	LEO	496.4km×510.3km	35.0 °	57727	2023-130A	CAST; SAST	Long March 2D	XSLC	Operational
Yaogan 39-01B	Unknown	31 August 2023	ELINT	LEO	496.5km×508.8km	35.0 °	57728	2023-130B	CAST; SAST	Long March 2D	XSLC	Operational
Yaogan 39-01C	Unknown	31 August 2023	ELINT	LEO	491.2km×512.4km	35.0 °	57731	2023-130E	CAST; SAST	Long March 2D	XSLC	Operational
Yaogan 39-02A	Unknown	17 September 2023	ELINT	LEO	500km×491km	35.0°	57886	2023-145A	CAST; SAST	Long March 2D	XSLC	Operational
Yaogan 39-02B	Unknown	17 September 2023	ELINT	LEO	497km×485km	35.0°	57887	2023-145B	CAST; SAST	Long March 2D	XSLC	Operational
Yaogan 39-02C	Unknown	17 September 2023	ELINT	LEO	496km×483km	35.0°	57888	2023-145C	CAST; SAST	Long March 2D	XSLC	Operational
Yaogan 39-03A	Unknown	5 October 2023	ELINT	LEO	501km×491km	35.0°	57986	2023-152A	CAST; SAST	Long March 2D	XSLC	Operational
Yaogan 39-03B	Unknown	5 October 2023	ELINT	LEO	502km×489km	35.0°	57987	2023-152B	CAST; SAST	Long March 2D	XSLC	Operational
Yaogan 39-03C	Unknown	5 October 2023	ELINT	LEO	501km×490km	35.0°	57988	2023-152C	CAST; SAST	Long March 2D	XSLC	Operational
Yaogan 39-04A	Unknown	23 October 2023	ELINT	LEO	502km×491km	35.0°	58141	2023-163A	CAST; SAST	Long March 2D	XSLC	Operational
Yaogan 39-04B	Unknown	23 October 2023	ELINT	LEO	502km×489km	35.0°	58143	2023-163C	CAST; SAST	Long March 2D	XSLC	Operational
Yaogan 39-04C	Unknown	23 October 2023	ELINT	LEO	501km×489km	35.0°	58145	2023-163E	CAST; SAST	Long March 2D	XSLC	Operational
Yaogan 39-05A	Unknown	10 December 2023	ELINT	LEO	502km×491km	35.0°	58557	2023-194A	CAST; SAST	Long March 2D	XSLC	Operational
Yaogan 39-05B	Unknown	10 December 2023	ELINT	LEO	500km×489km	35.0°	58558	2023-194B	CAST; SAST	Long March 2D	XSLC	Operational
Yaogan 39-05C	Unknown	10 December 2023	ELINT	LEO	501km×489km	35.0°	58559	2023-194C	CAST; SAST	Long March 2D	XSLC	Operational
Yaogan 40-01A	Unknown	10 September 2023	ELINT	LEO	803.1km×818.1km	86.0°	57830	2023-139A	CAST	Long March 6A	TSLC	Operational
Yaogan 40-01B	Unknown	10 September 2023	ELINT	LEO	801.9km×821.2km	86.0°	57832	2023-139C	CAST	Long March 6A	TSLC	Operational
Yaogan 40-01C	Unknown	10 September 2023	ELINT	LEO	774.9km×813.2km	86.0°	57833	2023-139D	CAST	Long March 6A	TSLC	Operational
Yaogan 40-02A	Unknown	11 May 2025	ELINT	LEO	859.77km×856.42km	85.9959°	63918	2025-096A	CAST	Long March 6A	TSLC	Operational
Yaogan 40-02B	Unknown	11 May 2025	ELINT	LEO	859.36km×856.82km	85.9950°	63919	2025-096B	CAST	Long March 6A	TSLC	Operational
Yaogan 40-02C	Unknown	11 May 2025	ELINT	LEO	859.62km×856.56km	85.9957°	63920	2025-096C	CAST	Long March 6A	TSLC	Operational
Yaogan 40-03A	Unknown	6 September 2025	ELINT	LEO	821.78km×799.17km	85.9941°	65544	2025-199A	CAST	Long March 6A	TSLC	Operational
Yaogan 40-03B	Unknown	6 September 2025	ELINT	LEO	859.70km×856.47km	85.9969°	65545	2025-199B	CAST	Long March 6A	TSLC	Operational
Yaogan 40-03C	Unknown	6 September 2025	ELINT	LEO	859.70km×856.47km	85.9968°	65546	2025-199C	CAST	Long March 6A	TSLC	Operational
Yaogan 40-04A	Unknown	24 September 2026	ELINT	LEO	817.11km×801.20km	85.9975°	A0823	2026-222A	CAST	Long March 6A	TSLC	Operational
Yaogan 40-04B	Unknown	24 September 2026	ELINT	LEO	818.38km×802.33km	85.9972°	A0824	2026-222B	CAST	Long March 6A	TSLC	Operational
Yaogan 40-04C	Unknown	24 September 2026	ELINT	LEO	817.67km×801.98km	85.9974°	A0825	2026-222C	CAST	Long March 6A	TSLC	Operational
Yaogan 41	Unknown	15 December 2023	EO	GSO	35839 km × 35732 km	4.97°	58582	2023-197A	CAST	Long March 5	WSLS	Operational
Yaogan 42-01	Unknown	2 April 2024	Unknown	LEO	502km×491km	35.0°	59395	2024-063A	SAST	Long March 2D	XSLC	Operational
Yaogan 42-02	Unknown	20 April 2024	Unknown	LEO	502km×490km	35.0°	59557	2024-075A	SAST	Long March 2D	XSLC	Operational
Yaogan 43-01A	Unknown	16 August 2024	Unknown	LEO	500km×493km	35.0°	60458	2024-148A	CAST; SAST; IAMCAS et al.	Long March 4B	XSLC	Operational
Yaogan 43-01B	Unknown	16 August 2024	Unknown	LEO	501km×492km	35.01°	60459	2024-148B	CAST; SAST; IAMCAS et al.	Long March 4B	XSLC	Operational
Yaogan 43-01C	Unknown	16 August 2024	Unknown	LEO	500km×494km	35.01°	60460	2024-148C	CAST; SAST; IAMCAS et al.	Long March 4B	XSLC	Operational
Yaogan 43-01D	Unknown	16 August 2024	Unknown	LEO	500km×494km	35.01°	60461	2024-148D	CAST; SAST; IAMCAS et al.	Long March 4B	XSLC	Operational
Yaogan 43-01E	Unknown	16 August 2024	Unknown	LEO	500km×494km	35.01°	60462	2024-148E	CAST; SAST; IAMCAS et al.	Long March 4B	XSLC	Operational
Yaogan 43-01F	Unknown	16 August 2024	Unknown	LEO	500km×494km	35.01°	60463	2024-148F	CAST; SAST; IAMCAS et al.	Long March 4B	XSLC	Operational
Yaogan 43-01G	Unknown	16 August 2024	Unknown	LEO	500km×494km	35.01°	60464	2024-148G	CAST; SAST; IAMCAS et al.	Long March 4B	XSLC	Operational
Yaogan 43-01H	Unknown	16 August 2024	Unknown	LEO	500km×494km	35.01°	60465	2024-148H	CAST; SAST; IAMCAS et al.	Long March 4B	XSLC	Operational
Yaogan 43-01J	Unknown	16 August 2024	Unknown	LEO	500km×494km	35.01°	60466	2024-148J	CAST; SAST; IAMCAS et al.	Long March 4B	XSLC	Operational
Yaogan 43-02A	Unknown	3 September 2024	Unknown	LEO	502km×490km (median)	35.0°	60945	2024-156A -	SAST; IAMCAS et al.	Long March 4B	XSLC	Operational
Yaogan 43-02B	Unknown	3 September 2024	Unknown	LEO	500km×494km	35.01°	60946	2024-156B	SAST; IAMCAS et al.	Long March 4B	XSLC	Operational
Yaogan 43-02C	Unknown	3 September 2024	Unknown	LEO	500km×494km	35.01°	60947	2024-156C	SAST; IAMCAS et al.	Long March 4B	XSLC	Operational
Yaogan 43-02D	Unknown	3 September 2024	Unknown	LEO	500km×494km	35.01°	60948	2024-156D	SAST; IAMCAS et al.	Long March 4B	XSLC	Operational
Yaogan 43-02E	Unknown	3 September 2024	Unknown	LEO	500km×494km	35.01°	60949	2024-156E	SAST; IAMCAS et al.	Long March 4B	XSLC	Operational
Yaogan 43-02F	Unknown	3 September 2024	Unknown	LEO	500km×494km	35.01°	60950	2024-156F	SAST; IAMCAS et al.	Long March 4B	XSLC	Operational
Yaogan 43-03A	Unknown	23 October 2024	ELINT	LEO	501km×493km	35.0°	61617	2024-190A	CAST; SAST	Long March 2C	XSLC	Operational
Yaogan 43-03B	Unknown	23 October 2024	ELINT	LEO	502km×490km	35.0°	61618	2024-190B	CAST; SAST	Long March 2C	XSLC	Operational
Yaogan 43-03C	Unknown	23 October 2024	ELINT	LEO	501km×491km	35.0°	61619	2024-190C	CAST; SAST	Long March 2C	XSLC	Operational
Yaogan 45	Unknown	9 September 2025	Unknown	MEO	7506km×7487km	20.0°	65563	2025-202A	SAST	Long March 7A	WSLS	Operational
Yaogan 46	Unknown	3 November 2025	Unknown	MEO	7497km×7361km	20.0°	66313	2025-250A	SAST	Long March 7A	WSLS	Operational
Yaogan 47	Unknown	9 December 2025	SAR (presumed)	LEO	297km×492km	97.52°	66988	2025-289A	SAST	Long March 4B	XSLC	Operational
Yaogan 50-01	Unknown	13 January 2026	SAR (presumed)	LEO	938km×700km	142.0°	67433	2026-006A	SAST	Long March 6A	TSLC	Operational
Yaogan 50-02	Unknown	15 March 2026	SAR (presumed)	LEO	947km×769km	142.0°	68196	2026-051A	SAST	Long March 6A	TSLC	Fragmented
Yaogan 50-03	Unknown	23 October 2026	SAR (presumed)	LEO	953.0km×951.8km	142.0295°	A1149	2026-240A	SAST	Long March 6A	TSLC	Operational
Yaogan 53-01	Unknown	10 September 2026	Unknown	LEO	522.42km×530.00km	44.9989°	A0651	2026-205A	CAST	Long March 4B	JSLC	Operational
Yaogan 53-02	Unknown	10 September 2026	Unknown	LEO	532.21km×526.29km	44.9973°	A0652	2026-205B	CAST	Long March 4B	JSLC	Operational
Yaogan 53-03	Unknown	10 September 2026	Unknown	LEO	529.92km×521.17km	44.9981°	A0653	2026-205C	CAST	Long March 4B	JSLC	Operational
Yaogan 53-07	Unknown	24 October 2026	Unknown	LEO	522.3km×513.9km	44.9974°	A1151	2026-241A	CAST	Long March 4B	JSLC	Operational
Yaogan 53-08	Unknown	24 October 2026	Unknown	LEO	522.2km×514.1km	44.9992°	A1152	2026-241B	CAST	Long March 4B	JSLC	Operational
Yaogan 53-09	Unknown	24 October 2026	Unknown	LEO	523.0km×513.2km	44.9964°	A1153	2026-241C	CAST	Long March 4B	JSLC	Operational
Yaogan 56-01	Unknown	10 September 2026	Unknown	LEO	530.07km×521.81km	44.9974°	A0654	2026-205D	CAST	Long March 4B	JSLC	Operational
Yaogan 56-02	Unknown	10 September 2026	Unknown	LEO	526.43km×519.84km	44.9947°	A0655	2026-205E	CAST	Long March 4B	JSLC	Operational
Yaogan 56-03	Unknown	10 September 2026	Unknown	LEO	528.97km×520.91km	44.9952°	A0656	2026-205F	CAST	Long March 4B	JSLC	Operational
Yaogan 56-19	Unknown	24 October 2026	Unknown	LEO	523.1km×512.9km	44.9957°	A1154	2026-241D	CAST	Long March 4B	JSLC	Operational
Yaogan 56-20	Unknown	24 October 2026	Unknown	LEO	522.7km×516.1km	44.9939°	A1155	2026-241E	CAST	Long March 4B	JSLC	Operational
Yaogan 56-21	Unknown	24 October 2026	Unknown	LEO	522.5km×512.5km	44.9938°	A1157	2026-241G	CAST	Long March 4B	JSLC	Operational
Table data sourced from previously cited references, "CalSky". calsky.com. CalSky. and "Real Time Satellite Tracking". n2yo.com. N2YO."Yaogan 30-01, ..., 30-07 (CX 5)". Gunter's Space Page. 30 May 2020.

== See also ==
- USSR / Russia - Kosmos (satellite)
- United States - NOSS
- France - CERES (satellite)
