= Göktürk-3 =

Turkish satellite

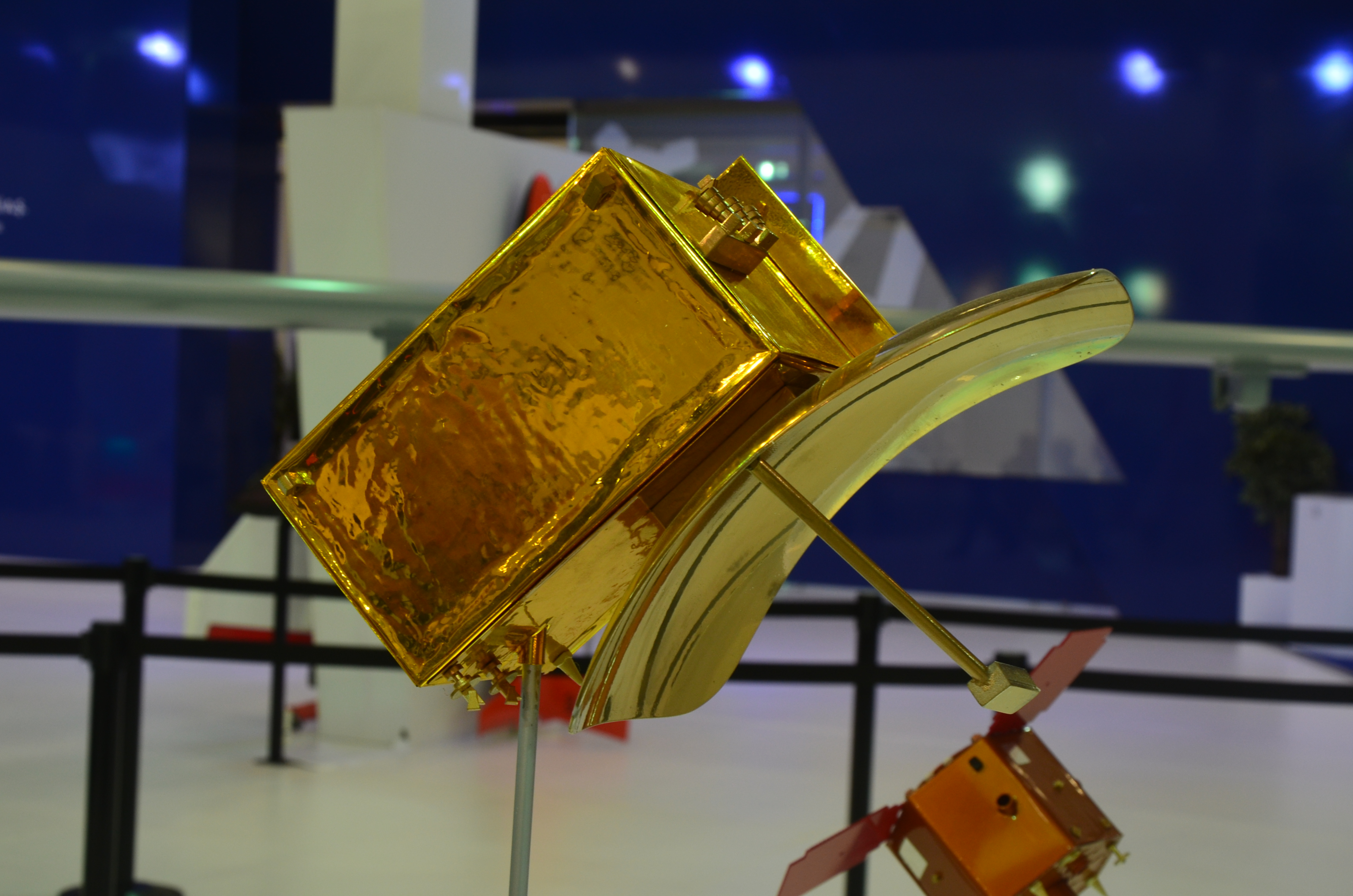
- Model of Göktürk-3 displayed at the stand of TAI during the IDEF'15
- Mission type: SAR Earth observation satellite
- Operator: Turkish Ministry of National Defence

Spacecraft properties
- Manufacturer: TAI; ASELSAN; TÜBİTAK UZAY

Start of mission
- Launch date: 2030 (planned)

Göktürk-3 is a synthetic aperture radar (SAR) Earth observation satellite that will be designed and developed under prime contractorship of Turkish Aerospace Industries (TAI) with support of Military Electronic Industries (ASELSAN) and TÜBİTAK Space Technologies Research Institute (TÜBİTAK UZAY) for the Turkish Ministry of National Defence.

== Project ==
The project is to provide high-resolution images from any location in the world in day and night, and in any weather condition without territorial waters and aerial domain restrictions to meet the requirements of the Turkish military. After the contract signed between Turkish Aerospace Industries (TAI) and Undersecretariat for Defence Industries (SSM) on 8 May 2013, the parties have started to work on the indigenous design of the satellite and ground stations. According to the announcement of the Undersecretariate of Ministry of National Defence, the launch of Göktürk-3 was planned by end 2019.

== See also ==
- Göktürk-1
- Göktürk-2
- List of Earth observation satellites
