= Venesat-1 =

Venezuelan communications satellite

VeneSat-1
- Names: Simón Bolívar
- Mission type: Communication
- Operator: ABAE
- COSPAR ID: 2008-055A
- SATCAT no.: 33414
- Mission duration: Planned: 15 years Final: 11 years, 4 months, 24 days

Spacecraft properties
- Bus: DFH-4
- Manufacturer: China Academy of Space Technology
- Launch mass: 5,049 kg (11,131 lb)
- Dimensions: 2.36 × 2.1 × 4 m (7.7 × 6.9 × 13.1 ft)
- Power: 7.75 kW

Start of mission
- Launch date: 29 October 2008, 16:53 UTC
- Rocket: Long March 3B/E
- Launch site: Xichang, LC-2
- Entered service: January 2009

End of mission
- Disposal: Loss of spacecraft
- Declared: 25 March 2020

Orbital parameters
- Reference system: Geocentric
- Regime: Geostationary
- Longitude: 78° West
- Semi-major axis: 42,448.3 km (26,376.2 mi)
- Eccentricity: 0.0056487
- Perigee altitude: 35,830.4 km (22,264.0 mi)
- Apogee altitude: 36,309.9 km (22,561.9 mi)
- Inclination: 0.0472°
- Epoch: 24 March 2020, 05:04:06 UTC

Transponders
- Band: 14 × C band 12 × K_{u} band 2 × K_{a} band
- Coverage area: South America (C band); Venezuela region (K_{u} and K_{a})

VeneSat-1, also known as Simón Bolívar (named after Venezuelan independence fighter Simón Bolívar), was the first Venezuelan satellite. It was designed, built and launched by the CGWIC subsidiary of the China Aerospace Science and Technology Corporation. It was a communications satellite operating from a geosynchronous orbit. The satellite was launched on a Chinese Long March 3B carrier rocket from Xichang Satellite Launch Center Launch Complex 2 on 29 October 2008 at 16:53 UTC.

== Overview ==
VeneSat-1, operated by Venezuela's Bolivarian Agency for Space Activities (ABAE), was built on the Chinese DFH-4 satellite bus. It had a mass of 5,049 kilograms (11,131 lb) and an expected service life of 15 years. The satellite featured a payload of 14 C-band, 12 K_{u}-band, and 2 K_{a}-band transponders. Occupying an orbital slot of 78° West, designated for Uruguay and ceded to Venezuela by mutual accord, it provided television broadcasting and broadband connectivity services.

However, since 13 March 2020, VeneSat-1 has been out of service due to a series of maneuvers that left it tumbling and drifting away from its assigned orbital position. Seradata reported that the satellite lost both of its solar array drives between February and March 2020, resulting in a loss of power for the spacecraft. The operator attempted to perform an emergency move of the spacecraft to a graveyard orbit, but evidently, only the apogee engine burn was successful while the perigee burn failed. It is suggested that the spacecraft may have run out of power during the perigee attempt, or exhausted its fuel supply. As of 23 March 2020, VeneSat-1 was in an elliptical orbit of approximately 36,300 by 35,800 kilometres (22,600 by 22,200 mi), with its perigee approximately 50 kilometres (31 mi) above the normal geosynchronous orbit. It had also drifted west by 30°.

On 24 March 2020, the Venezuelan government transferred the majority of VeneSat-1's functions to the American Intelsat 14. The following day, Venezuela's Ministry of Science and Technology officially declared the satellite lost, marking the end of its mission. VeneSat-1 failed three years prior to its expected end of life.

== Significance ==
Venezuela's work on Venesat-1 was conducted in part to amplify regional network Telesur's programming by enabling it to avoid geo-blocking efforts by DirecTV, an American company.

== See also ==
- VRSS-1
- VRSS-2
- Media of Venezuela
