= Göktürk-2 =

Turkish Earth observation satellite

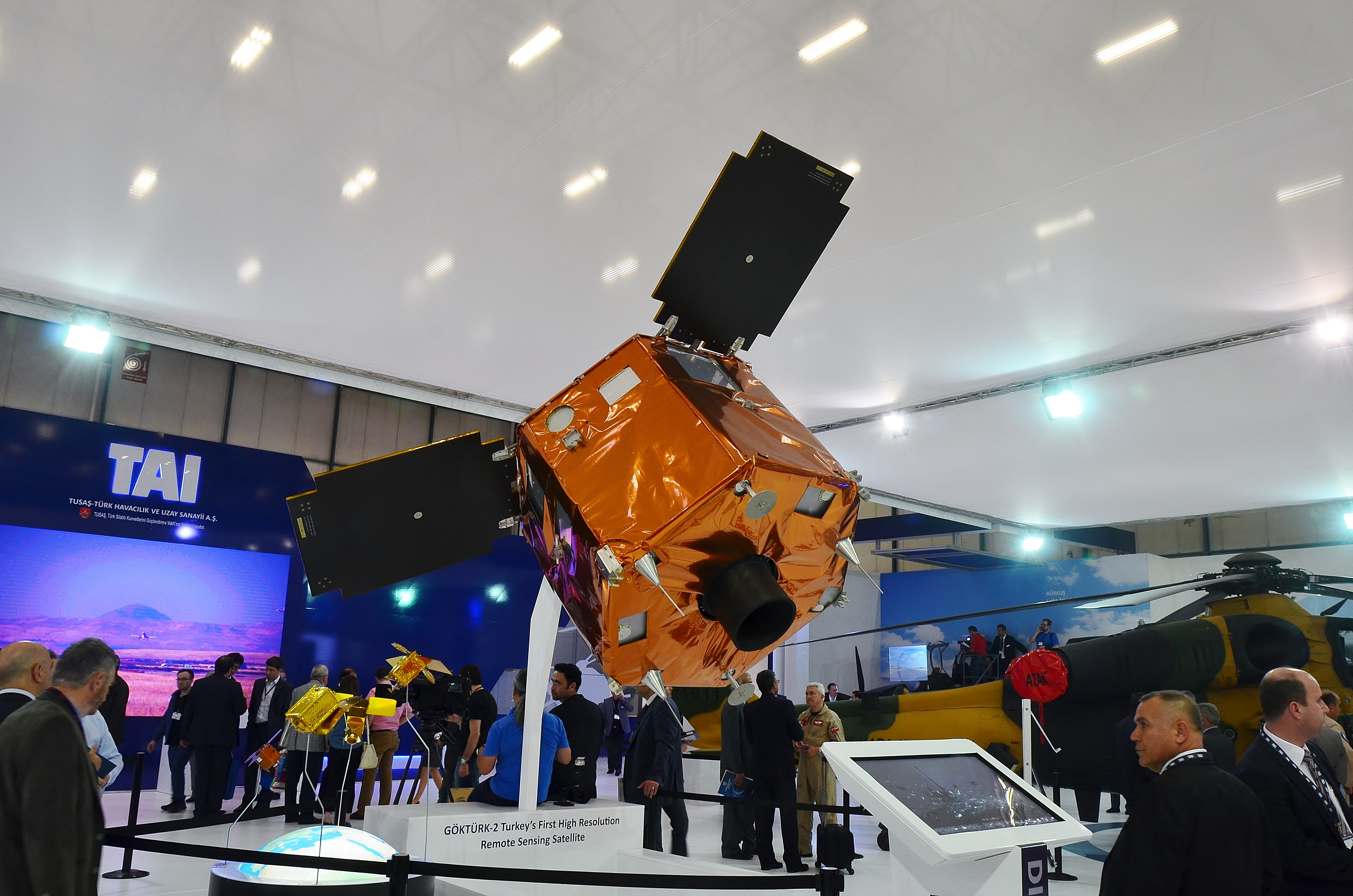
- Model of Göktürk-2 displayed at the stand of TAI during the IDEF'15
- Mission type: Earth observation
- Operator: Turkish Ministry of National Defence
- COSPAR ID: 2012-073A
- SATCAT no.: 39030

Spacecraft properties
- Manufacturer: Scientific and Technological Research Council of Turkey (TÜBİTAK); TÜBİTAK Space Technologies Research Institute (TÜBİTAK UZAY); Turkish Aerospace Industries (TUSAŞ)
- Launch mass: 400 kilograms (880 lb)

Start of mission
- Launch date: December 18, 2012, 16:12:52 UTC
- Rocket: Chang Zheng 2D
- Launch site: Jiuquan LA-4/SLS-2

Orbital parameters
- Reference system: Geocentric
- Regime: Sun-synchronous
- Inclination: 98 degrees
- Period: 98 minutes

Göktürk-2 is an Earth observation satellite designed and developed by the Scientific and Technological Research Council of Turkey (TÜBİTAK) and built by TÜBİTAK Space Technologies Research Institute (TÜBİTAK UZAY) and Turkish Aerospace Industries (TUSAŞ) for the Turkish Ministry of National Defence.

Göktürk-2 was launched from Jiuquan Launch Area 4 / SLS-2 in China by a Long March 2D space launch vehicle at 16:12:52 UTC on December 18, 2012, one day before the initial schedule due to poor weather conditions in the region. Equipped with state of the art advanced technology developed by Turkey and a series of new enhancements to provide improved high resolution imagery, it was placed at 16:26 UTC into a low Earth orbit of 686 km (426 mi). The first signal from Göktürk-2 was received at 17:39 UTC in the Tromsø Satellite Station, northern Norway.

Produced with 80 per cent indigenously developed technology and 100% domestically developed software, the satellite offers high-resolution imagery of 2.5 m (8.2 ft) resolution at panchromatic, 10 m (33 ft) at multispectral (VNIR) and 20 m (66 ft) at SWIR band. It is Turkey's second national satellite following RASAT, which was launched from Russia on August 17 the same year. For the telecommunication, it has three S band receivers and transmitters. Göktürk-2 later put its solar panels into service, and began the week after the launch to send data and its first images, which were from the United States, Brazil, India as well as Turkey's western city of İzmir.

== Resolution and payload ==
Rahmi Güçlü of Yıldız Technical University in Istanbul, an engineer appointed by the Government of Turkey to audit and report on the Göktürk-2 program, has claimed that the imagery obtained from space by Göktürk-2 satellite can be used to identify even individuals, due to the state-of-the-art software filters they have developed and that the Turkish Government has already begun using the technology for obtaining intelligence on the military operations of several countries in the region.

In addition to its primary military reconnaissance mission, Göktürk-2 will carry out various civil applications on mapping and planning, landcover survey, geology, ecosystem monitoring, disaster management, environmental control, coastal zone management, and water resources.

The satellite is part of a family of Göktürk earth observations satellites, which Turkey is developing in order to increase its intelligence resources. As of December 2012, Göktürk-1 is in production and Göktürk-3 in project phase.

== Foreign input ==
SpaceTech GmbH Immenstaad has supplied the solar generator system, which consists of the following:

- three solar panels (including photovoltaic assembly),
- panel deployment mechanisms,
- the pyro drive module (PDM) electronics executing the deployment sequence of the mechanism.

== Israeli objections ==
Israel had repeatedly voiced its objection to the launch of the Göktürk family of satellites by Turkey, stating that it would be used to obtain high resolution imagery of Israel, which could eventually fall into the wrong hands.

Turkish Prime Minister Recep Tayyip Erdogan rejected Israeli objections, stating that Turkey is a sovereign nation and as such it would not allow any Israeli interference with Turkey's decision to design, develop, manufacture and launch high resolution intelligence satellites.

== See also ==
- Göktürk-1
- Göktürk-3
- List of Earth observation satellites
