= VRSS-1 =

Venezuelan remote sensing satellite

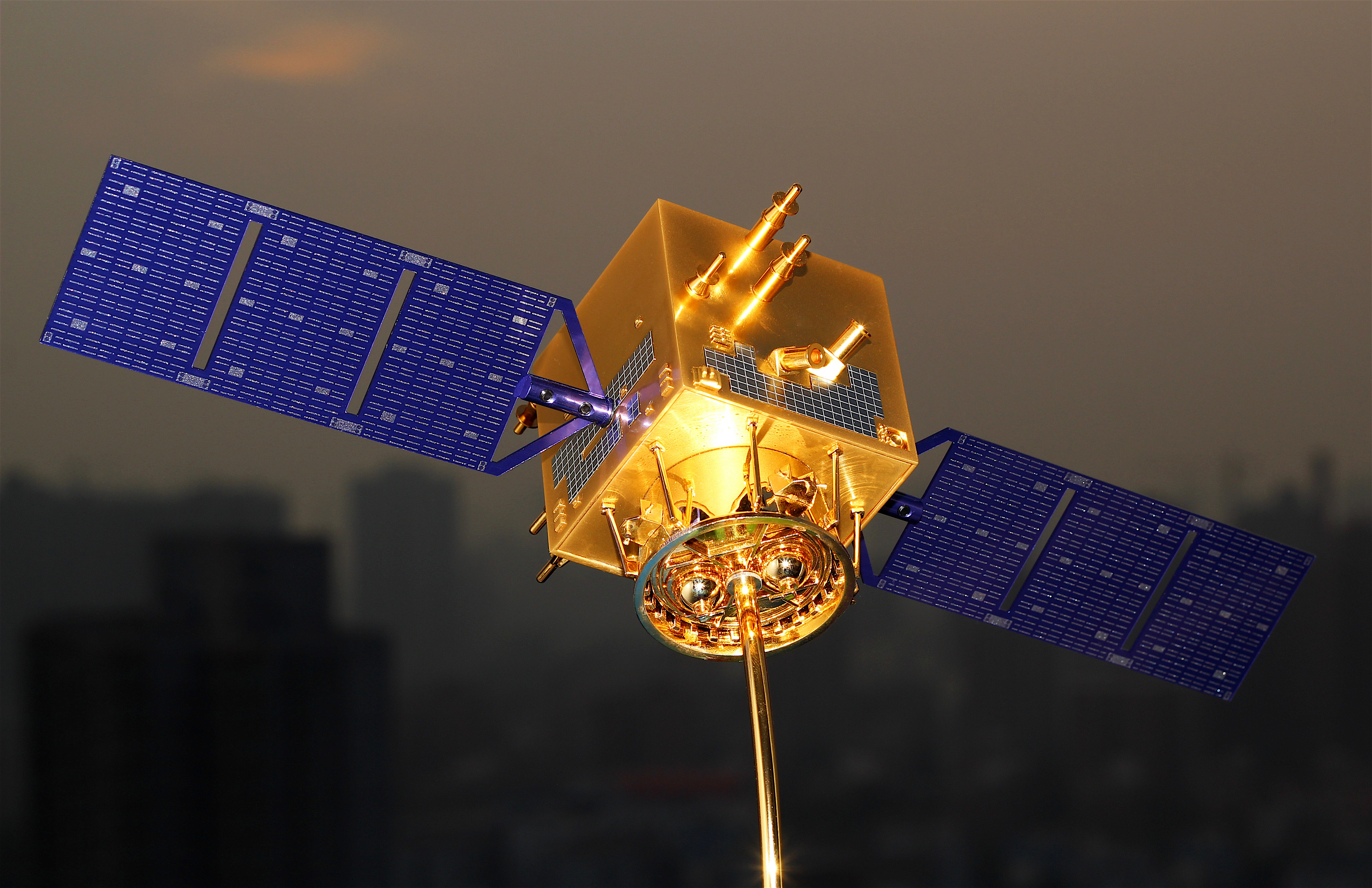
- 1:25 scale replica of VRSS-1
- Mission type: earth observation satellite
- Operator: Bolivarian Agency for Space Activities
- COSPAR ID: 2012-052A
- SATCAT no.: 38782
- Mission duration: 5 years

Spacecraft properties
- Bus: CAST 2000
- Manufacturer: China Great Wall Industry Corporation; China Academy of Space Technology
- Launch mass: 880 kilograms (1,940 lb) at launch

Start of mission
- Launch date: 29 September 2012, 04:12 UTC
- Rocket: Chang Zheng 2D
- Launch site: Jiuquan LA-4/SLS-2

Orbital parameters
- Reference system: Geocentric
- Regime: low Earth orbit
- Eccentricity: 0.0023
- Perigee altitude: 622 kilometres (386 mi)
- Apogee altitude: 654 kilometres (406 mi)
- Inclination: 98.04
- Period: 97.48
- Epoch: 29 September 2012, 08:57:00 UTC

VRSS-1 (Venezuelan Remote Sensing Satellite-1), also known as (Satellite) Francisco Miranda, is the first Venezuelan remote sensing satellite, and the second Venezuelan satellite after VENESAT-1. It will be used to study the territory of Venezuela and help with planning, agriculture and disaster recovery. It was built and launched by the Chinese and has been named after Venezuelan revolutionary Francisco de Miranda. It reached end of life in 2022.

== Satellite ==
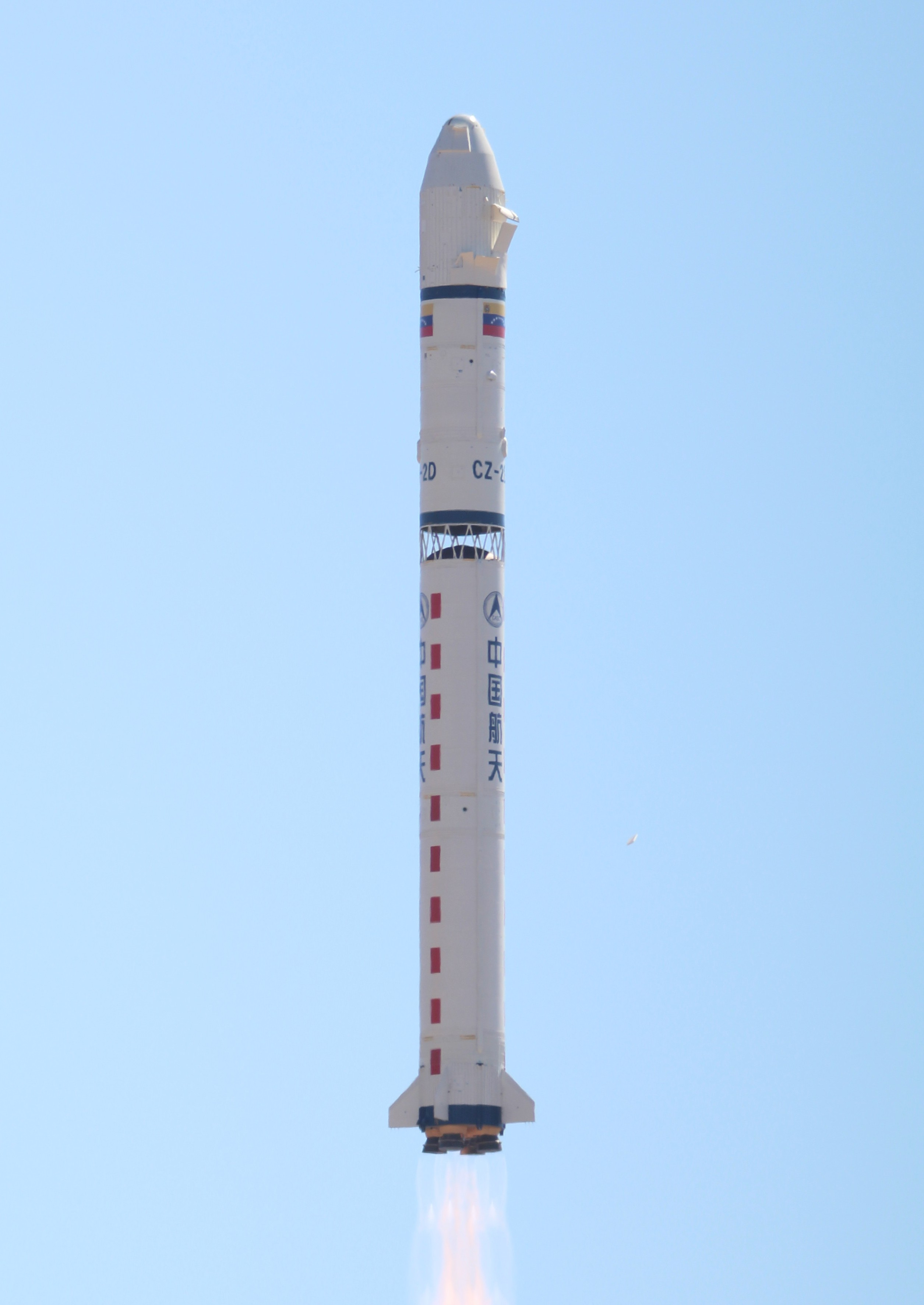
A Long March 2D launching VRSS-1 on 29 September 2012

The satellite was built after a contract between Venezuela and China was signed in Caracas on 26 May 2011, and follows from their previous collaboration on VENESAT-1. The contract, worth $144.8 million USD, included $67.8 million for the satellite, $22m for the launch, $16m for the ground station in Venezuela and $22m for software. The main contractor is China Aerospace Science and Technology Corporation and the satellite is based on the CAST 2000 bus developed by the China Academy of Space Technology. One source posits that VRSS-1 is based upon the Chinese Yaogan-2 reconnaissance satellite.

The satellite contains two different resolution cameras. The highest resolution ones have a resolution of 2.5 metres (8 ft 2 in) in panchromatic mode, and 10 metres (33 ft) in multispectral mode. The lower resolution cameras have a resolution of 16 metres (52 ft). It will provide 350 images a day, with the first one on or about 10 October.

The satellite will pass over Venezuela three or four times every 24 hours and will cover the same area of Venezuela every 57 days. It is controlled from the Base Aeroespacial Capitán Manuel Ríos in El Sombrero, Guárico and managed by Venezuela's Bolivarian Agency for Space Activities. It has an estimated life of 5 years.

== Launch ==
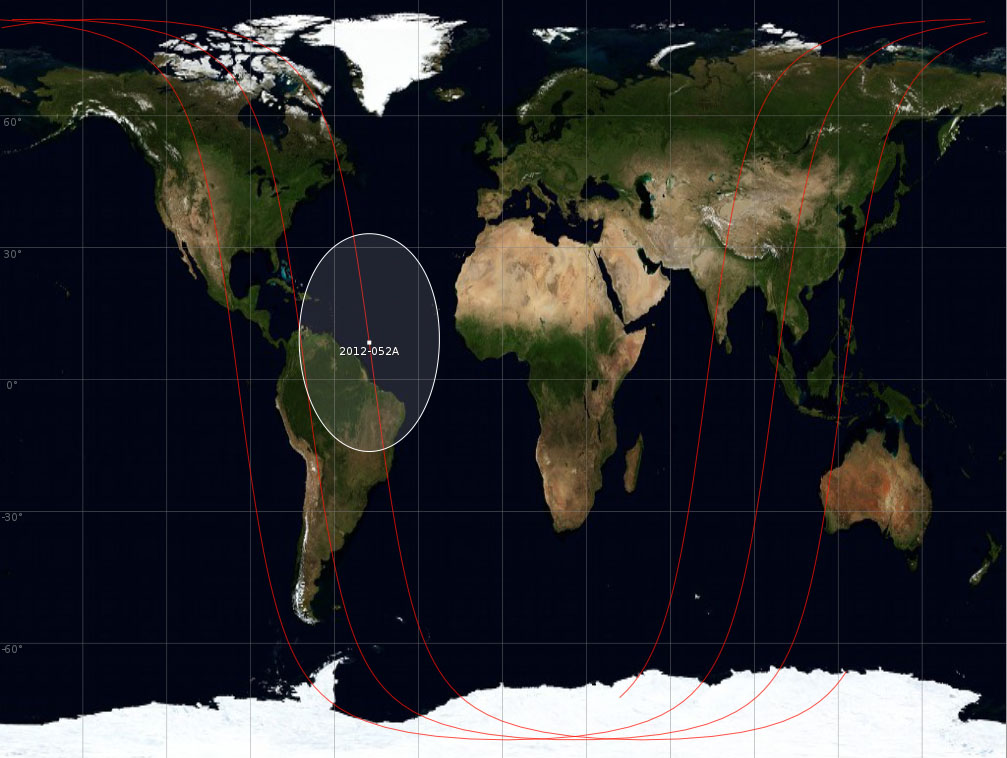
Ground track of VRSS

The satellite was launched on 29 September 2012 at 4:12 UTC from pad 603 at launch complex 43 at Jiuquan Launch Centre in China. It was launched by a Long March 2D rocket which put the satellite into low Earth orbit. It was given the international designator 2012-052A and the United States Space Command assigned it the Satellite Catalog Number 38782.

== See also ==
- Venesat-1
- VRSS-2
