= Committee on Earth Observation Satellites =

International organization

The Committee on Earth Observation Satellites (CEOS) is an international coordination body established in 1984 to facilitate cooperation among space agencies operating Earth observation satellite systems. CEOS consists of 35 member organisations (operating or planning Earth observation satellites) alongside 32 associate organisations. Membership across both categories spans over 35 countries, as well as numerous intergovernmental organisations. While membership is restricted to national or international organisations; non-members may participate in thematic and technical activities. Commercial, academic and non-governmental organisations participate in Working Groups and Virtual Constellations.

== Background ==
CEOS was established in September 1984 in response to a recommendation from a Panel of Experts on Remote Sensing from Space and set up under the aegis of the G7 Economic Summit of Industrial Nations Working Group on Growth, Technology, and Employment. This Panel recognized the multidisciplinary nature of space-based Earth observations and the value of coordinating international Earth observation efforts to benefit society.

== Mission ==
The stated mission of CEOS is to coordinate civil space-based Earth observation programmes internationally and to promote the exchange of data in support of societal and environmental decision-making.

In October 2024, during its 40th anniversary plenary in Montreal, CEOS adopted the Montreal Statement, reaffirming organisational priorities and reflecting on four decades of activity.

== Organisational Structure ==
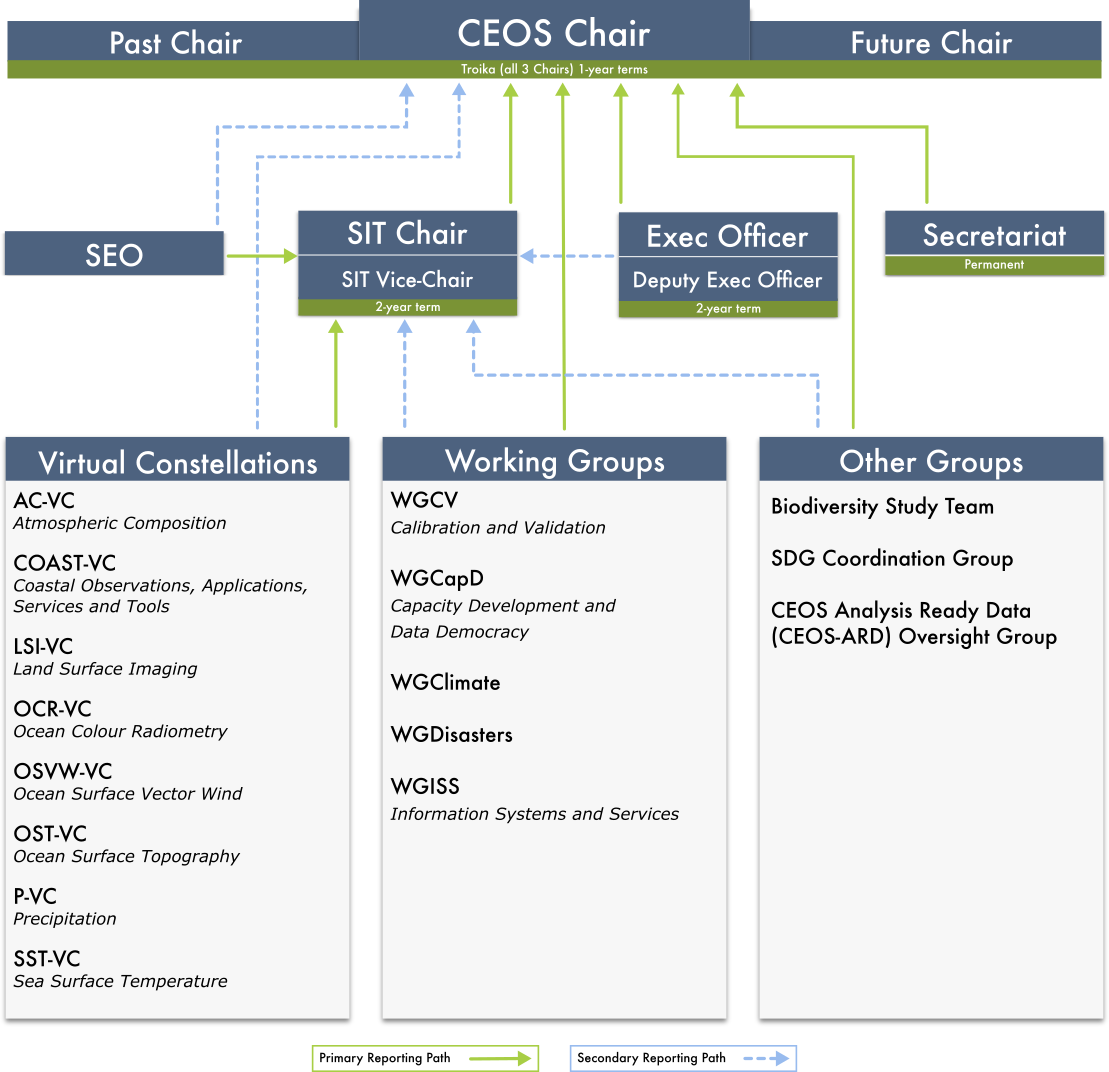
Organisational Chart for the Committee on Earth Observation Satellites (CEOS)

CEOS leadership roles are supported by members on a rotating basis.

=== CEOS Chair and CEOS Plenary ===
The CEOS Chair is a senior space agency official who serves a one-year term, and hosts the annual CEOS Plenary.

=== Strategic Implementation Team (SIT) ===
The Strategic Implementation Team (SIT) is formed of all CEOS Members and Associates, and focuses on strategic guidance with regard to governance, stakeholders, and the accomplishment of the CEOS Work Plan. The SIT is led by the SIT Chair, who serves a two-year term, and hosts the annual SIT meeting and SIT Technical Workshop.

==== The CEOS Executive Officer ====
The CEOS Executive Officer serves a two-year term, and supports the Chair and SIT Chair in coordinating CEOS activities, via management of the CEOS Work Plan.

=== The Systems Engineering Office (SEO) ===
The System Engineering Office (SEO) provides systems engineering leadership to the Virtual Constellations, Working Groups, and other ad hoc CEOS activities. The SEO facilitates the use of systems engineering methodologies and tools to strengthen plans and improve CEOS collaboration.

=== Working Groups ===
CEOS Working Groups address topics that are cross discipline, as well as thematic topics which are shared across a wide range of Earth observation domains. Working Groups are led by a Chair and Vice Chair, who are nominated representatives from CEOS Members or Associates.

The five CEOS Working Groups are:

- Working Group on Capacity Building & Data Democracy (WGCapD)
- CEOS/CGMS Joint Working Group on Climate (WGClimate)
- Working Group on Calibration & Validation (WGCV)
- Working Group on Disasters (WGDisasters)
- Working Group on Information Systems & Services (WGISS)

=== Virtual Constellations ===
A CEOS Virtual Constellation is a set of space and ground segment capabilities operating together in a coordinated manner, in effect a virtual system that overlaps in coverage in order to meet a combined and common set of Earth observation requirements.

The eight CEOS Virtual Constellations are:

- Atmospheric Composition (AC-VC)
- Coastal Observations Applications Services and Tools (COAST-VC)
- Land Surface Imaging (LSI-VC)
- Ocean Colour Radiometry (OCR-VC)
- Ocean Surface Topography (OST-VC)
- Ocean Surface Vector Wind (OSVW-VC)
- Precipitation (P-VC)
- Sea Surface Temperature (SST-VC)

== See also ==
- Group on Earth Observations
- List of Earth observation satellites
