= Gök Medrese =

Gök Medrese may refer to:

- Gök Medrese, Sivas, an Islamic educational institution in Sivas, Turkey
- Gök Medrese, Tokat, an Islamic educational institution in Tokat, Turkey
