= VRSS-2 =

Venezuelan remote sensing satellite

- Mission type: Earth observation
- Operator: Bolivarian Agency for Space Activities
- COSPAR ID: 2017-060A
- SATCAT no.: 42954
- Mission duration: 5 years

Spacecraft properties
- Bus: CAST 2000
- Manufacturer: China Great Wall Industry Corporation; China Academy of Space Technology
- Launch mass: 975 kilograms (2,150 lb) at launch
- Power: @1700Kw

Start of mission
- Launch date: 9 October 2017, 04:12 UTC
- Rocket: Chang Zheng 2D
- Launch site: Jiuquan LA-4/SLS-2
- Contractor: SAS

Orbital parameters
- Reference system: Geocentric
- Regime: low Earth orbit
- Eccentricity: 0.0023
- Perigee altitude: 634.6 kilometres (394.3 mi)
- Apogee altitude: 663.7 kilometres (412.4 mi)
- Inclination: 98.00
- Period: 97.6
- Epoch: 17350.82709734

VRSS-2 (Venezuelan Remote Sensing Satellite-2), also known as (Satellite) Antonio José de Sucre, is the second Venezuelan remote sensing satellite, and the third Venezuelan satellite after VRSS-1. It will be used to study Venezuelan territory and support planning, agriculture and disaster recovery. It was built and launched by the Chinese and has been named after Venezuelan revolutionary Antonio José de Sucre.

== Satellite ==
The satellite was built after a contract between Venezuela and China was signed in Caracas on 5 Oct 2014, and follows from their previous collaboration on VRSS-1 Miranda Remote Sensing Satellite. The contract, worth 170 million USD, The main contractor is China Great Wall Industry Corporation and the satellite is based on the CAST 2000 bus developed by the China Academy of Space Technology.

The satellite contains two different cameras, High Resolution Camera (HRC) and Infrared Camera (IRC). The highest resolution band 0.98 metres (3 ft 3 in) GSD in panchromatic, and 4 metres (13 ft) GSD in multispectral. The Infrared cameras have a resolution of (Long Wave) 60 metres (200 ft) and (Short Wave) 30 metres (98 ft) GSD, totaling 10 spectral bands.

The satellite passes over Venezuela three or four times every 24 hours, covering the same area in 101 days at Nadir. Is operated from the Base Aeroespacial Capitán Manuel Ríos in El Sombrero, Guárico state by Venezuela's Bolivarian Agency for Space Activities, design life span (5 years)

== Launch ==
The satellite was launched 9 October 2017 at 4:12 UTC from Jiuquan Launch Centre in P.R China by a Long March 2D rocket, into a Sun Synchronous Descending Orbital node at 10:30am low Earth orbit. It was given the international designator 2017-060A and United States Space Command Satellite Catalog Number 42954.

== Funding ==
- BANDES

== See also ==
- Venesat-1
- VRSS-1
