= Göktürk-1 =

Turkish earth observation satellite

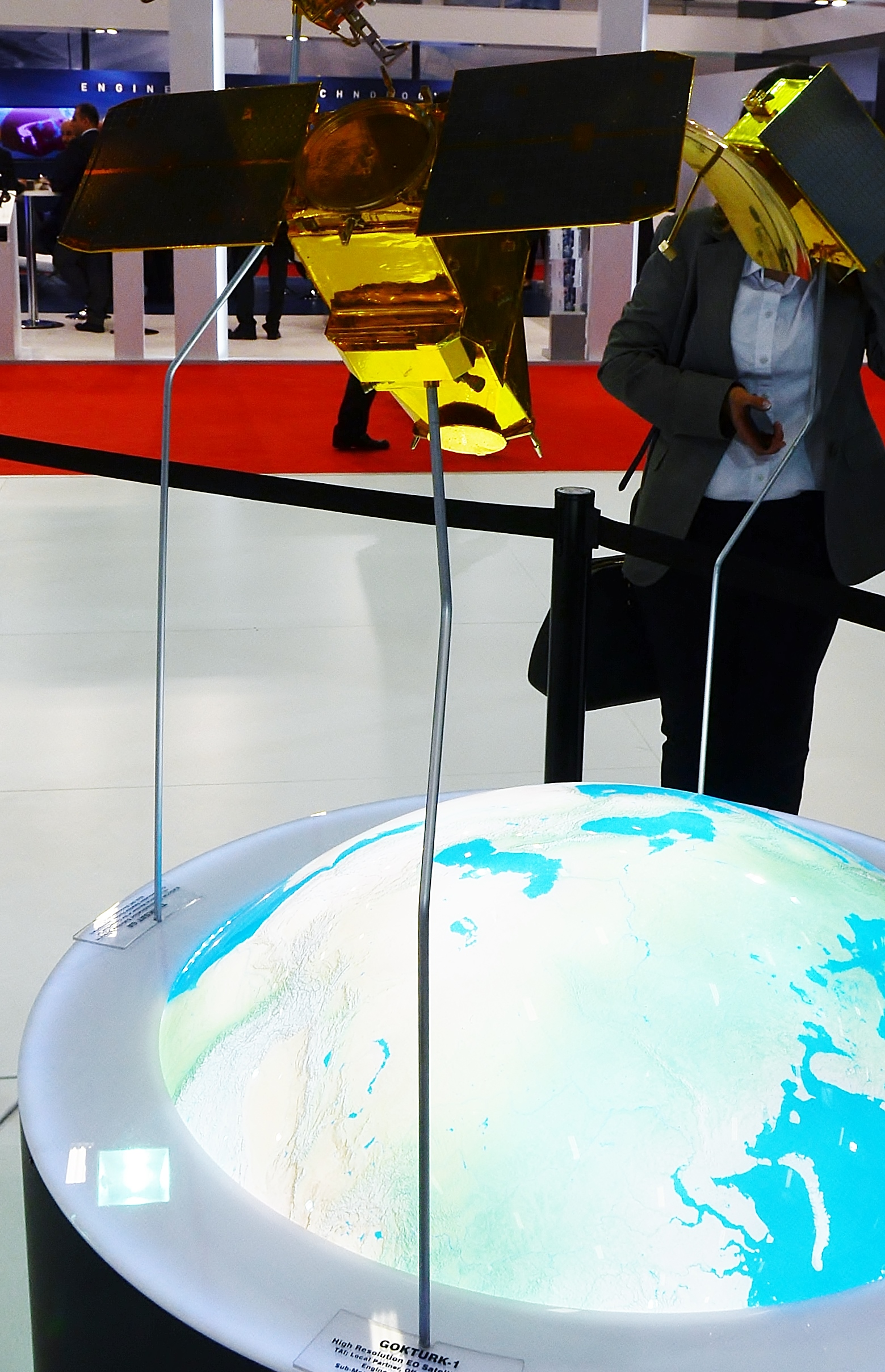
- Model of Göktürk-1 displayed at the stand of TAI during the IDEF'15
- Mission type: Earth observation
- Operator: Turkish Ministry of National Defence
- COSPAR ID: 2016-073A
- SATCAT no.: 41875

Spacecraft properties
- Manufacturer: Telespazio; Thales Alenia Space; Turkish Aerospace Industries (TUSAŞ)

Start of mission
- Launch date: 5 December 2016
- Rocket: Vega flight VV08
- Launch site: Kourou ELV
- Contractor: Arianespace

Orbital parameters
- Reference system: Geocentric
- Regime: Sun-synchronous
- Epoch: Planned

Göktürk-1 (also Göktürk-1A) is a high resolution Earth observation satellite (greater than 50 cm) designed and developed for the Turkish Ministry of National Defence by the Italian space service company Telespazio with technological input from Turkish Aerospace Industries (TUSAŞ) and ASELSAN of Turkey.

The agreement to build Göktürk-1 was signed on July 13, 2009 between the Ministry of National Defence and Telespazio, a Finmeccanica/Thales Group joint venture company, taking effect on July 19, 2009. Thales Alenia Space is in charge of supplying the satellite bus. Within the framework of the project, a facility for assembly, integration and testing of spacecraft (UMET) up to 5,000 kg (11,000 lb) mass will be established in Turkey, which is considered as a critical infrastructure. The project is valued at more than € 250m.

The satellite with 0.80 m (2 ft 7 in) resolution is intended for use of reconnaissance over any location on Earth without geographical restriction. Additionally, it will carry out various civil applications on mapping and planning, landcover survey, geology, ecosystem monitoring, disaster management, environmental control, coastal zone management, and water resources. On March 18, 2025, a satellite photo of the Çanakkale Martyrs' Memorial was shared as the 100,000th image taken by the satellite.

== Dispute with Israel ==
Israel started a pressure campaign on the French company Thales Group, which is one of the shareholders of Telespazio. Israel expressed its fear that the high resolution imagery taken by Göktürk-1 over its territory could eventually fall into the wrong hands. Israel, which supplies some of the critical electro-optical parts of the satellite's high-technology camera system to Thales Group, stipulated that Göktürk-1 should be made incapable of taking imagery as long as it is over Israel.

Turkey, after having received such information, demanded from the contractor Thales Group that it has to prove the satellite can take imagery from any location desired. The French producer initially rejected this demand, but later decided to accept it, after the Turkish government responded by stopping the payments.

Turkish bureaucrats also requested the launch of the satellite to be made by an experienced and well-known space company. Thales Group, on the other hand, originally proposed to commission a launch company without too much experience in order to cut the costs.

== Launch ==
After numerous delays due to political and business disputes, which were finally solved, the satellite was launched from the Guiana Space Center at 13:51:44 UTC, on 5 December 2016, on flight VV08 of the European Space Agency's Vega rocket.

Four years earlier, Göktürk-2, another Earth observation satellite of the Göktürk series (however with lower resolution compared to Göktürk-1) was successfully placed in orbit on December 18, 2012.

== See also ==
- Göktürk-2
- Göktürk-3
- List of Earth observation satellites
