= Bolivarian Agency for Space Activities =

Space Agency in Venezuela

Agencia Bolivariana para Actividades Espaciales
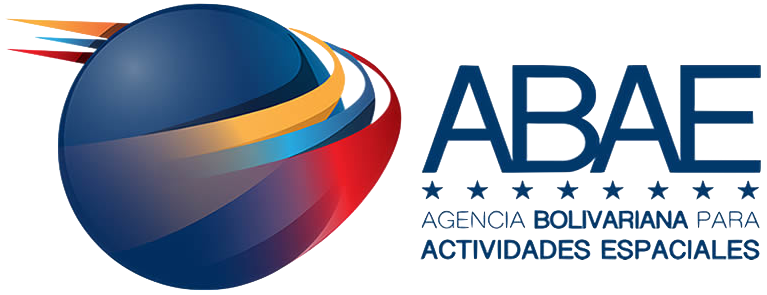
- ABAE

Agency overview
- Formed: October 25, 2007; 18 years ago
- Preceding agency: CEV (2005–2007)
- Headquarters: Caracas, Venezuela
- Employees: 270
- Agency executive: Adolfo José Godoy Pernía, President
- Website: www.abae.gob.ve

The Bolivarian Agency for Space Activities (ABAE; Spanish: Agencia Boliviariana para Actividades Espaciales) is an agency of the Ministry of Science of Venezuela, responsible for developing and carrying out policies of the National Executive Venezuela regarding the use of the outer space.

== History ==
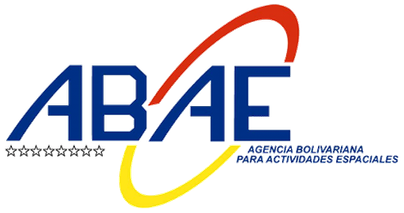
ABAE logo (2007 to 2017)

Originally designated Venezuelan Space Center (CEV), created on November 28, 2005. Then, the requirements grew up and the body was renamed as Bolivarian Agency for Space Activities (ABAE). The purpose of this agency is to design, coordinate and implement and operate the policies of the Venezuelan National Executive, related to the peaceful use of outer space, and act as a decentralized entity specialized in aerospace. Since its creation, it has been working on the launch of the first artificial satellite of Venezuela, the Satellite Simon Bolivar (Venesat-1), operational on October 29, 2008, Satellite Miranda (VRSS-1) on September 29, 2012, Satellite Sucre (VRSS-2) Oct 2017, operates the Ground Receiving Stations and Ground Application Center for the country's remote sensing satellites.

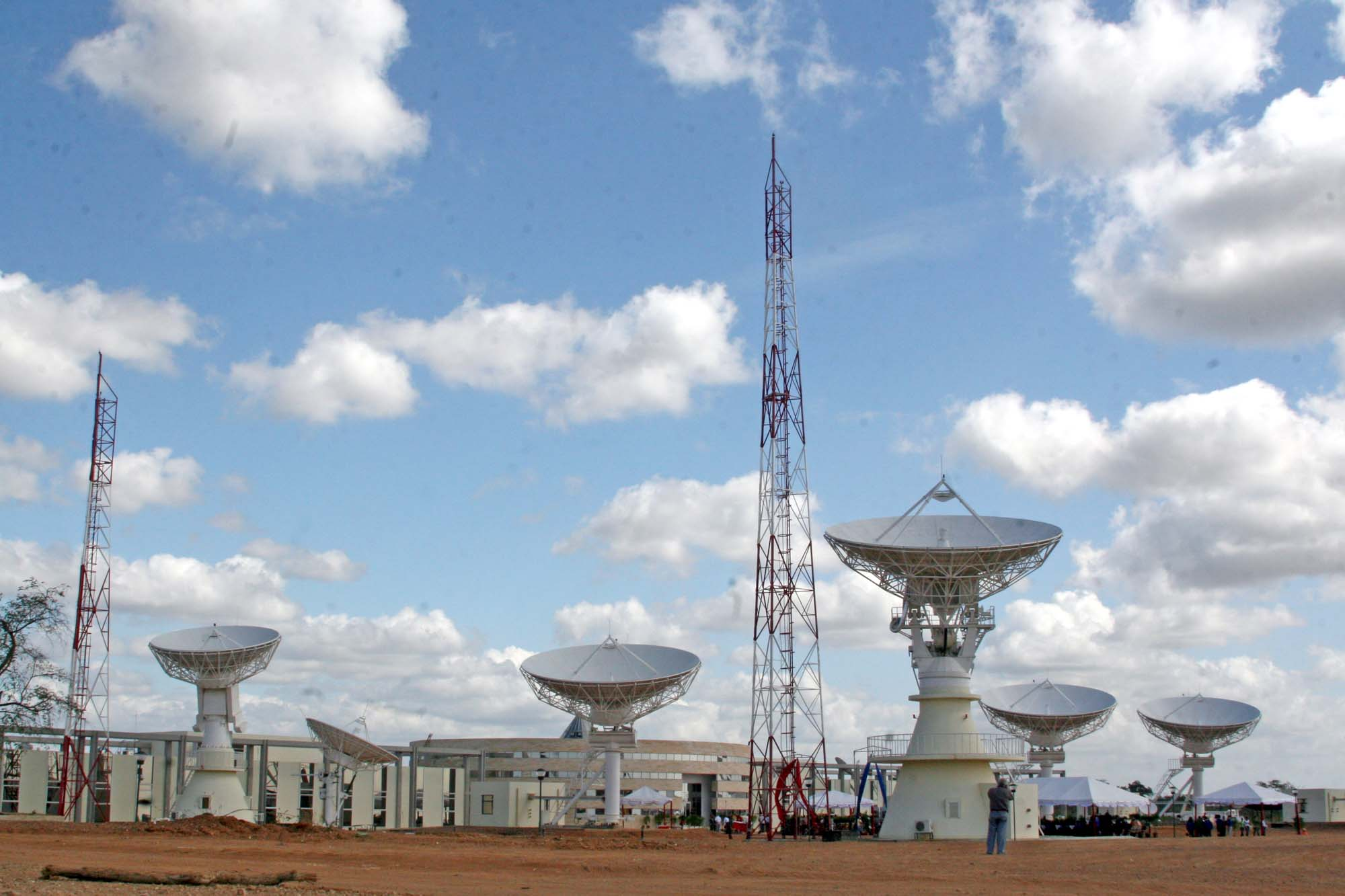
ABAE's space centre

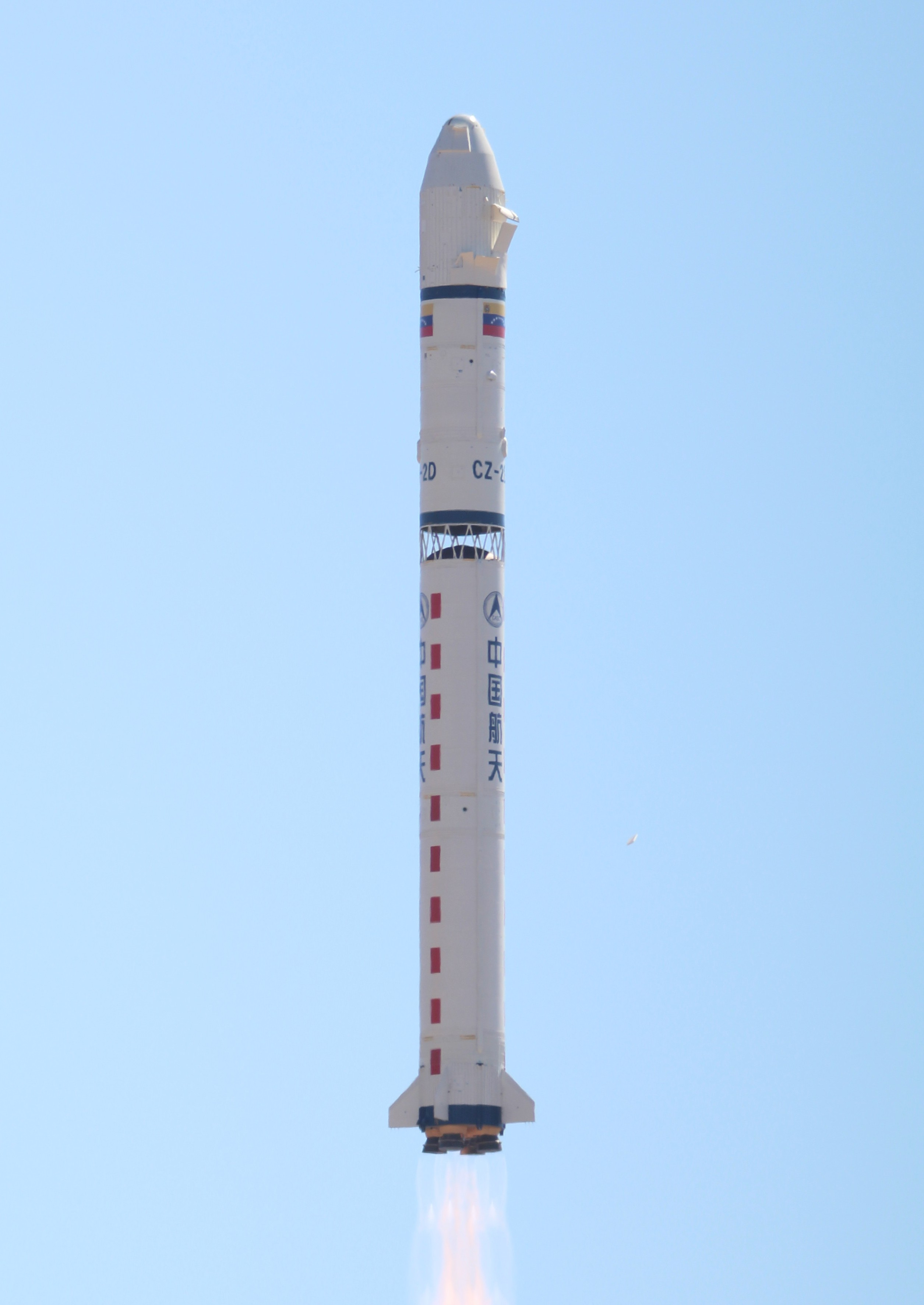
A Long March 2D launching VRSS-1 on 29 September 2012

== Governance ==
The institution is governed and administered by a board of directors composed of a chairman and four members and their alternates. The President is appointed by the head of state, the four members and their alternates shall be officials of appointment and removal of the Minister of Science (MPPEUCT)

== See also ==
- List of government space agencies
- Venesat-1
- VRSS-1
- VRSS-2
- Communications satellite

== Member of ==
- International Charter 'Space and Major Disasters'
