= TÜBİTAK Space Technologies Research Institute =

Turkish space technology institution

TÜBİTAK Space Technologies Research Institute TÜBİTAK Uzay Teknolojileri Araştırma Enstitüsü
- Abbreviation: TÜBİTAK UZAY
- Predecessor: Ankara Electronics Research and Development Institute
- Formation: 1985
- Type: GO
- Purpose: Space technology
- Location: Ankara, Turkey
- Director: M. Mehmet Nefes
- Parent organization: Scientific and Technological Research Council of Turkey (TÜBİTAK)
- Affiliations: European Space Agency (ESA); Asia-Pacific Space Technology Cooperation (APSCO); International Society for Photogrammetry and Remote Sensing (ISPRS); Disaster Monitoring Constellation (DMC); Committee on Earth Observation Satellites (CEOS); Consultative Committee for Space Data Systems (CCSDS); EUROPRACTICE IC Service
- Staff: 269
- Website: uzay.tubitak.gov.tr
- Formerly called: Ankara Electronics Research and Development Institute; Ankara Elektronik Araştırma Geliştirme Enstitüsü

TÜBİTAK Space Technologies Research Institute (Turkish: TÜBİTAK Uzay Teknolojileri Araştırma Enstitüsü) or TÜBİTAK UZAY for short, is a Turkish institution carrying out research and development projects on space technology, electronics, information technology, and related fields. It was established in 1985, under the name "Ankara Electronics Research and Development Institute" within the campus of Middle East Technical University (ODTÜ) in cooperation with the Scientific and Technological Research Council of Turkey (Turkish: Türkiye Bilimsel ve Teknolojik Araştırma Kurumu, TÜBİTAK) and the university in Ankara. In 1995, the organization was renamed. Since 1998, the institute has been a new building on the campus.

TÜBİTAK UZAY specializes in space technologies, electronics, information technologies, and related fields. The institute takes part in R&D projects and assists the aerospace industry in solving technical problems encountered during system design, selection and uses, product development, and manufacturing in above mentioned specialization areas.

TÜBİTAK UZAY focuses on the manufacturing and testing of small space satellites.

== Research areas ==
TÜBİTAK UZAY conducts its research and development activities in the following areas with a total of 235 staff members, out of which 151 are researchers and technical support personnel.

- Space Technologies: Satellite systems, satellite sub-systems, satellite ground station sub-systems, satellite test and integration systems.
- Electronics: Communication systems, electronics system design, electro-optic mission payload, high-speed digital design, IC design.
- Software: Computer vision, speech processing, pattern recognition, remote sensing, multimedia technologies, data mining, machine learning, natural language processing, artificial intelligence.
- Power Electronics: Power quality, compensation systems, electrical motor drives, switched-mode power supplies, renewable energy resources.
- Power Distribution Systems: Analysis of electric production and transmission systems, strategic research and development in distribution automation, Supervisory Control, and Data Acquisition (SCADA) Systems, criteria setting for planning, design, and operation of distribution systems.

== Affiliations ==
TÜBİTAK UZAY is a member of the following institutions:

- Asia-Pacific Space Cooperation Organization (APSCO)
- International Society for Photogrammetry and Remote Sensing (ISPRS)
- Disaster Monitoring Constellation (DMC)
- Committee on Earth Observation Satellites (CEOS)
- Consultative Committee for Space Data Systems (CCSDS)
- EUROPRACTICE IC Service
- Co-operation agreement with European Space Agency

== Uzay in numbers ==
Professional background of personnel at TÜBİTAK UZAY
Electrical and Electronic Engineer	133
Computer Engineer	22
Industrial Engineer	7
Other Researchers	34
Technicians	37
Support Staff	43
Part-Time Employee	13
TOTAL	269

Educational Background of Researchers

Undergraduate	54
Graduate	91
Ph.D.	27
