= Ziyuan (satellite) =

Chinese remote sensing satellites

- Country of origin: China, Brazil
- Operator: CRESDA / INPE; People's Liberation Army
- Applications: Remote sensing Reconnaissance

Specifications
- Bus: Phoenix-Eye
- Regime: Sun-synchronous
- Design life: 2-4 years

Production
- Status: Operational
- On order: 1
- Built: 17
- Launched: 17
- Retired: 5
- Failed: 1
- Lost: 1
- Maiden launch: Ziyuan I-01; 14 October 1999
- Last launch: Ziyuan III-04; 16 December 2025

Related spacecraft
- Derivatives: CBERS

Ziyuan (simplified Chinese: 资源; traditional Chinese: 資源; pinyin: Zī Yuán; lit. 'resources') is a series of remote sensing satellites operated by the People's Republic of China. Several Ziyuan satellites are operated jointly with Brazil's National Institute for Space Research under the China–Brazil Earth Resources Satellite program.

Ziyuan satellites are based on the Phoenix-Eye-1 or Phoenix-Eye-2 satellite buses - the Phoenix-Eye-1 is used for CBERS missions while the Phoenix-Eye-2 is used for the remaining satellites. The Ziyuan-II series satellites are operated by the Chinese military. The Ziyuan-III series satellites are operated by the Ministry of Natural Resources.

== Satellites ==
Satellite	COSPAR ID	SATCAT	Launch date	Rocket	Launch site	Status	Remarks
Ziyuan I series
Ziyuan I-01 (CBERS-1)	1999-057A	25940	14 October 1999, 03:15 UTC	CZ-4B	Taiyuan, LC-7	Retired 2003	
Ziyuan I-02 (CBERS-2)	2003-049A	28057	21 October 2003, 03:16 UTC	CZ-4B	Taiyuan, LC-7	Retired 2007	
Ziyuan I-02B (CBERS-2B)	2007-042A	32062	19 September 2007, 03:26 UTC	CZ-4B	Taiyuan, LC-7	Failed 2010	
Ziyuan I-02C	2011-079A	38038	22 December 2011, 03:26 UTC	CZ-4B	Taiyuan, LC-9	Operational	
Ziyuan I-03 (CBERS-3)	—		9 December 2013, 03:26 UTC	CZ-4B	Taiyuan, LC-9	Launch failure	
Ziyuan I-04 (CBERS-4)	2014-079A	40336	7 December 2014, 03:26 UTC	CZ-4B	Taiyuan, LC-9	Operational	
Ziyuan I-04B (CBERS-4B)			2018	CZ-4B	Taiyuan	On order	
Ziyuan I-02D	2019-059A	44528	12 September 2019, 03:26 UTC	CZ-4B	Taiyuan	Launched	
Ziyuan I-04A (CBERS-4A)	2019-093E	44883	20 December 2019, 03:22 UTC	CZ-4B	Taiyuan LC-9	Launched	
Ziyuan I-02E	2021-131A	50465	26 December 2021, 03:11 UTC	CZ-4C	Taiyuan LC-9	Launched	
Ziyuan II series
Ziyuan II-01	2000-050A	26481	1 September 2000, 03:25 UTC	CZ-4B	Taiyuan, LC-7	De-orbited 3 November 2016	
Ziyuan II-02	2002-049A	27550	27 October 2002, 03:17 UTC	CZ-4B	Taiyuan, LC-7	De-orbited 22 January 2015	
Ziyuan II-03	2004-044A	28470	6 November 2004, 03:10 UTC	CZ-4B	Taiyuan, LC-7	Presumed retired	
Ziyuan III series
Ziyuan III-01	2012-001A	38046	9 January 2012, 03:17 UTC	CZ-4B	Taiyuan, LC-9	Operational	
Ziyuan III-02	2016-033A	41556	30 May 2016, 03:17 UTC	CZ-4B	Taiyuan, LC-9	Launched	
Ziyuan III-03	2020-051A	45939	25 July 2020, 03:13 UTC	CZ-4B	Taiyuan, LC-9		
Ziyuan III-04				CZ-4B	Taiyuan, LC-9		
