= China–Brazil Earth Resources Satellite program =

Satellite cooperation program between China and Brazil

CBERS
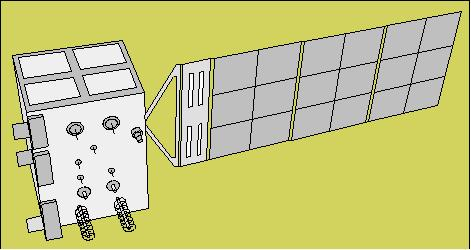
- Line drawing of the CBERS/ZY-1 spacecraft
- Country of origin: China / Brazil
- Operator: CNSA / INPE
- Applications: Remote sensing

Specifications
- Bus: Phoenix-Eye 1
- Regime: Sun-synchronous orbit
- Design life: 2-3 years

Production
- Status: Operational
- On order: 1
- Built: 6
- Launched: 6
- Operational: 2
- Retired: 3
- Failed: 0
- Lost: 1
- Maiden launch: CBERS-1; 14 October 1999
- Last launch: CBERS-4A; 20 December 2019

Related spacecraft
- Derived from: Ziyuan

The China–Brazil Earth Resources Satellite program (CBERS) is a technological cooperation program between Brazil and China which develops and operates Earth observation satellites.

== History ==
The basis for the space cooperation between China and Brazil was established in May 1984, when both countries signed a complementary agreement to the cooperation framework agreement in science and technology. In July 1988, China and Brazil signed the protocol establishing the joint research and production of the China-Brazil Earth Resources Satellites (CBERS). Brazil, emerging from a long military regime, sought to abandon the Cold War logic and establish new international partnerships. China was dedicated to its great internal reform, but was also seeking international partnerships to develop advanced technologies. The agreement was advantageous for both countries. Brazil had the chance to develop medium-size satellites at a time when it was only capable of building small ones (100 kg size). China had an international partner that posed no military threats and that was receptive of foreigners.

Brazil and China negotiated the CBERS project during two years (1986–1988), exchanging important technical information and visiting each other's facilities, and they concluded that both sides had all the human, technical and material conditions to jointly develop an Earth resource observation satellite program. The Complementary Protocol on Cooperation on Space Technology was renewed in 1994 and again in 2004.

== Responsible agencies ==
In Brazil, the Instituto Nacional de Pesquisas Espaciais (INPE or National Institute for Space Research) and the Brazilian Space Agency (Portuguese: Agência Espacial Brasileira; AEB) are involved with the program, as is the Brazilian industrial sector. In China, organizations involved include the China Academy of Space Technology (CAST) (a sub-entity of the China Aerospace Science and Technology Corporation) (CASC), the China National Space Administration (CNSA) and various other organizations.

== Satellites ==
Initially the program included development and deployment of two satellites, CBERS-1 and CBERS-2. A third satellite of the same type, which was named CBERS-2B, was later added to the program. Subsequently, agreement was reached to build and launch three additional satellites, CBERS-3, 4 and 4A.

=== CBERS-1 and CBERS-2 ===
The first satellite of the series, CBERS-1, was successfully launched on 14 October 1999 on a Long March 4B. In China, it is sometimes also called ZY 1. It remained functional until August 2003.

The second satellite, CBERS-2, was successfully launched on October 21, 2003 by a Long March 4B rocket from China. It was retired from service in January 2009, after the launch of CBERS-2B.

==== Configuration ====
CBERS-1 and 2 are almost identical satellites. They have three remote sensing multispectral cameras:

- Wide Field Imager Camera. This camera records images in two spectral bands: 0.63 – 0.69 μm (red) and 0.77 – 0.89 μm (infrared), with 260 m spatial resolution and 890 km of ground swath. About five days are necessary for a whole coverage of the Earth surface.
- Medium Resolution Camera. This camera records images in five spectral bands: 0.51 – 0.73 μm (panchromatic); 0.45 – 0.52 μm (blue); 0.52 – 0.59 μm (green); 0.63 – 0.69 μm (red); 0.77 – 0.89 μm (near infrared), with 20 m spatial resolution and 120 km of ground swath. It is possible to operate this camera both on nadir and off-nadir. This last capability allows the system to reduce the temporal resolution from 26 days (nadir operation mode) to three days (off-nadir operation mode).
- Infrared Multispectral Scanner Camera. This camera records images in four spectral bands: 0.50 – 1.10 μm (panchromatic); 1.55 – 1.75 μm (infrared); 2.08 – 2.35 μm (infrared) and 10.40 – 12.50 μm (thermal infrared), with 80 m spatial resolution on the three infrared reflected bands and 120 m in the thermal infrared one. Ground swath is 120 km for all the bands of this camera and 26 days are required to obtain a full coverage of the Earth by this camera.

=== CBERS-2B ===
CBERS-2B was launched on 19 September 2007 by a Long-March 4B rocket from the Taiyuan base in China. The satellite operated until June 2010. Sample images from CBERS-2B were made available on January 10, 2007.

CBERS-2B is similar to the two previous members of the series, but a new camera was added to this last satellite: High Resolution Panchromatic Camera (HRC). This camera records images in one single panchromatic band 0.50 – 0.80 μm which comprises part of the visible and of the near infrared portion of electromagnetic spectrum. The images recorded by this camera are 27 km width and have 2.7 m spatial resolution. 130 days are required to obtain a full coverage of the Earth by this camera.

=== CBERS-3 and CBERS-4 ===
CBERS-3 was launched in December 2013, but it was lost after the Chang Zheng 4B rocket carrying it malfunctioned. The identical CBERS-4 satellite was successfully launched in December 2014. Both satellites carry four cameras:

- Advanced Wide Field Imager Camera. This camera records images in four spectral bands: 0.45 – 0.52 μm (blue); 0.52 – 0.59 μm (green); 0.63 – 0.69 μm (red); 0.77 – 0.89 μm (near infrared), with 60 m spatial resolution and 720 km of ground swath. About five days are necessary for a whole coverage of the Earth surface.
- Infrared Multispectral Scanner Camera. This camera records images in four spectral bands: 0.50 – 1.10 μm (panchromatic); 1.55 – 1.75 μm (infrared); 2.08 – 2.35 μm (infrared) and 10.40 – 12.50 μm (thermal infrared), with 40 m spatial resolution on the three infrared reflected bands and 80 m in the thermal infrared one. Ground swath is 120 km for all the bands of this camera and 26 days are required to obtain a full coverage of the Earth by this camera.
- Panchromatic and Multispectral Camera. This camera records images in four spectral bands: 0.51 – 0.73 μm (panchromatic); 0.45 – 0.52 μm (blue); 0.52 – 0.59 μm (green); 0.63 – 0.69 μm (red); 0.77 – 0.89 μm (near infrared), with 5 m spatial resolution for the panchromatic band and 10 m spatial resolution in the other bands. It has 60 km of ground swath. It is possible to operate this camera both on nadir and off-nadir.

=== CBERS-4A ===
CBERS-4A was launched 20 December 2019 on board a Long March 4B rocket from Taiyuan Satellite Launch Center.

== See also ==
- Chinese space program
- Brazilian space program
- Ziyuan 3

== Addition reading ==
- Fabíola de Oliveira (2009). Brasil-China: 20 Anos de Cooperação Espacial [Brazil-China: 20 Years of Cooperation in Space] (in Portuguese and English). Cubo. p. 97. ISBN 978-85-60064-18-2.
