= Haiyang (satellite) =

Chinese ocean observation satellite

Animation of Haiyang - Polar view, Earth is not shown · Haiyang-1A · Haiyang-1B · Haiyang-1C · Haiyang-1D · Haiyang-2A · Haiyang-2B

Haiyang (HY, Chinese: 海洋; pinyin: Hǎiyáng; lit. 'ocean') is a series of marine remote sensing satellites developed and operated by the People's Republic of China since 2002. The name "Haiyang" translates to "ocean" in English. As of October 2022, eight satellites have been launched with ten more planned. Built by the state-owned aerospace contractor China Academy of Space Technology (CAST), Haiyang satellites carry a variety of ocean-imaging sensor payloads and are operated by the National Satellite Ocean Application Service (NSOAS), a subordinate agency of the State Oceanic Administration (SOA). Haiyang satellites are launched from Taiyuan Satellite Launch Center (TSLC) into Sun-synchronous orbit (SSO) aboard Long March-series rockets.

China's National Satellite Ocean Application Service owns three series of Haiyang-series satellites, Haiyang-1 (HY-1) are designed to measure ocean color, Haiyang-2 (HY-2) to study maritime environment dynamics, and Haiyang-3 (HY-3) to conduct ocean surveillance.

== Spacecraft ==
=== Satellite bus ===
The first three of a total four Haiyang 1-series satellites are based on the CAST968 minisatellite bus, the same used three years prior for the Shijian 5 and carry multiple payloads. First launched aboard a Long March 4B rocket with Fengyun-1D in May 2002 into sun-synchronous orbit, the 367 kg HY-1A measures 1.2m × 1.1m × 0.94m reaching a total length of 7.5 meters with its solar panels extended. These satellites uses three magnetorquers and liquid hydrazine monopropellant for attitude control and to conduct on-orbit station-keeping. The spacecraft maintain attitude to approximately a half-degree using a Sun sensor and infrared Earth sensor. The spacecraft's imaging, transmission, and thermal heating systems are powered by two extended solar arrays providing 405 Watts (320 by end of life) and two packs of nickel-cadmium batteries that produce 23 ampere hours of DC power when the satellites' solar panels are not exposed to the sun. Launched in June 2020, Haiyang 1D was the only satellite of the HY-1 series to be based on the CAST2000 bus instead of the CAST968 bus.

For telemetry, tracking, and command (TT&C) communication, the HY-1A uses the S-band with an uplink data-rate of 2 kilobits per second (kbps) and a downlink rate of 4 kbit/s. HY-1A stores up to 80 megabits of gathered payload data from the onboard COCTS and CZI instruments until it establishes communications with the Beijing, Hangzhou, and Sanya ground station to downlink the payload data over X-band with quadrature phase shift keying (QPSK) at a rate of 5.32 megabits per second.

=== Sensor payloads ===
All four Haiyang 1 satellites (HY-1A through HY-1D) bear two maritime imaging sensors, the Chinese Ocean Color and Temperature Scanner (COCTS) and the Coastal Zone Imagery (CZI). Developed by the Shanghai Institute of Technical Physics (SITP), a subcomponent of the China Academy of Sciences (CAS), COCTS comprises a focal plane array (FPA), scanner, an electronics box, and a series of optics. The 50 kg sensor system collects 1.1 km spatial resolution maritime imagery within ten bands (eight in visible near infrared, VNIR, and two in thermal infrared, TIR) through a 200 mm aperture. COCTS rotates its imager ±35.2º, approximately 1400 km per swath.

Chinese Ocean Color and Temperature Scanner (COCTS) Bands
| Band | IR | Spectral range | S/N | Observation function |
|---|---|---|---|---|
| 1 | VNIR | 0.402 – 0.422 μm | 440 | Yellow substance, water pollution |
| 2 | VNIR | 0.433 – 0.453 μm | 600 | Chlorophyll absorption |
| 3 | VNIR | 0.480 – 0.500 μm | 590 | Chlorophyll, sea ice, pollutants, shallow topography |
| 4 | VNIR | 0.510 – 0.530 μm | 560 | Chlorophyll, water depth, low-concentration sediment |
| 5 | VNIR | 0.555 – 0.575 μm | 525 | Chlorophyll, low-concentration sediment |
| 6 | VNIR | 0.660 – 0.680 μm | 390 | Fluorescence, high-concentration sediment, aerosols, pollutants, atmospheric correction |
| 7 | VNIR | 0.745 – 0.785 μm | 400 | High-concentration sediments, atmospheric correction |
| 8 | VNIR | 0.845 – 0.885 μm | 415 | Atmospheric correction, water vapor |
| 9 | TIR | 10.30 – 11.40 μm | N/A | Sea surface temperature (SST), sea ice, cloud top temperature |
| 10 | TIR | 11.40 – 12.50 μm | N/A | SST, sea ice, cloud top temperature |

Also aboard all four HY-1 satellites is a Coastal Zone Imagery (CZI), developed by the Beijing Institute of Space Mechanics and Electricity (BISME, Chinese: 北京空间机电一体化研究所) under CAST. CZI is a four-band charge-coupled device (CCD), pushbroom multispectral imager (MSI). Sometimes referred to as the satellites' four-band CCD imager", CZI is intended to provide 250 m spatial resolution imagery over coastal regions in 36° (500 km) swaths. These bands are:

- 0.42 – 0.50 μm to observe pollutants, vegetation growth, ocean color, and sea ice
- 0.52 – 0.60 μm to observe suspended sediments, pollutants, vegetation, sea ice, and wetlands
- 0.61 – 0.69 μm to observe suspended sediments, soil, and water vapor
- 0.76 – 0.89 μm to observe soil and water vapor with atmospheric correction

Due to power issues, the CZI sensor aboard Haiyang-1A lost functionality seventeen months after launch on 1 December 2003.

Haiyang 1C and Haiyang 1D both carried an ultraviolet imager, abbreviated UVI, providing twice-daily global coverage. Used in conjunction with COCTS and CZI, HY-1C and HY-1D have been used to identify harmful algae blooms such as cyanobacteria in Lake Tai, detect marine oil spills near Indonesia, and measure nearshore turbidity with atmospheric correction. HY-1C and HY-1D's UVI images in two ultraviolet bands, 0.345 – 0.365 μm and 0.375 – 0.395 μm, both in the UV-A range.

Both HY-1C and HY-1D are equipped with a satellite calibration spectrometer (SCS) which provides on-orbit radiometric calibration for COCTS and UVI sensor systems.

Haiyang 1C and Haiyang 1D also maintain an automatic identification system (AIS) payload, used to track and identify ship locations, to collect, store, and relay AIS messages globally. HY-1C and HY-1D's AIS system simultaneously operates on four bands: 161.975 MHz, 162.025 MHz, 156.775 MHz, and 156.825 MHz with a swath width of over 950 kilometers.

== Satellites ==
| Name | Launch | Payloads | Orbit | Orbital apsis | Inclination | SCN | COSPAR ID | Launcher | Launch site | Status |
|---|---|---|---|---|---|---|---|---|---|---|
| Haiyang 1A | 15 May 2002 | COCTS, CZI | SSO | 787.7 km × 801.4 km | 98.6° | 27430 | 2002-024A | Long March 4B | TSLC | Decayed |
| Haiyang 1B | 11 April 2007 | COCTS, CZI | SSO | 787.7 km × 807.7 km | 98.3° | 31113 | 2007-010A | Long March 2C | TSLC | Decayed |
| Haiyang 1C | 7 September 2018 | COCTS, CZI, UVI, SCS, AIS | SSO | 776.2 km × 793.5 km | 98.4° | 43609 | 2018-068A | Long March 2C | TSLC | Operational |
| Haiyang 1D | 10 June 2020 | COCTS, CZI, UVI, SCS, AIS | SSO | 782.6 km × 787.1 km | 98.5° | 45721 | 2020-036A | Long March 2C | TSLC | Operational |
| Haiyang 1E | (TBD 2022) | Unknown | SSO | (Planned: Not yet launched) | | | | Long March 2C | TSLC | Planned |
| Haiyang 1F | (TBD 2024) | Unknown | SSO | (Planned: Not yet launched) | | | | Unknown | TSLC | Planned |
| Haiyang 2A | 15 August 2011 | ALT, CMR, DORIS, LRA, MWRI, SCAT | SSO | 975.0 km × 976.0 km | 99.3° | 37781 | 2011-043A | Long March 4B | TSLC | Operational |
| Haiyang 2B | 24 October 2018 | ALT, CMR, DORIS, LRA, MWRI, SCAT | SSO | 972.5 km × 974.5 km | 99.3° | 43655 | 2018-081A | Long March 4B | TSLC | Operational |
| Haiyang 2C | 21 September 2020 | ALT, CMR, DORIS, LRA, MWRI, SCAT | SSO | 953.6 km × 964.6 km | 66.0° | 46469 | 2020-066A | Long March 4B | TSLC | Operational |
| Haiyang 2D | 19 May 2021 | ALT, CMR, DORIS, LRA, MWRI, SCAT | SSO | 950.7 km × 967.4 km | 66.0° | 48621 | 2021-043A | Long March 4B | TSLC | Operational |
| Haiyang 2E | 1 July 2026 | ALT, CMR, DORIS, LRA, MWRI, SCAT | SSO | 929 km × 949 km | 99.3° | 69738 | 2021-043A | Long March 4B | JSLC | Operational |
| Haiyang 2F | (TBD 2024–2029) | ALT, CMR, DORIS, LRA, MWRI, SCAT | SSO | (Planned: Not yet launched) | | | | Unknown | TSLC | Planned |
| Haiyang 2G | (TBD 2025–2030) | ALT, CMR, DORIS, LRA, MWRI, SCAT | SSO | (Planned: Not yet launched) | | | | Unknown | TSLC | Planned |
| Haiyang 2H | (TBD 2023–2028) | ALT, CMR, DORIS, LRA, MWRI, SCAT | SSO | (Planned: Not yet launched) | | | | Unknown | TSLC | Planned |
| Haiyang 3A | 16 November 2023 | SAR | SSO | | | | | Long March 2C / YZ-1S | JSLC | Operational |
| Haiyang 3B | (TBD 2024) | SAR | SSO | (Planned: Not yet launched) | | | | Long March 2C / YZ-1S | JSLC | Planned |
| Haiyang 3C | (TBD 2022) | Unknown | SSO | (Planned: Not yet launched) | | | | Unknown | TSLC | Planned |
| Haiyang 3D | (TBD 2025–2033) | Unknown | SSO | (Planned: Not yet launched) | | | | Unknown | TSLC | Planned |
| Haiyang 4A | 14 November 2024 | SAR | SSO | | | | | Long March 4B | TSLC | Operational |
Sources: NASA, US Space Force, CelesTrak, World Meteorological Organization

== See also ==
- Gaofen
- Fengyun
- Chinese State Oceanic Administration
