= SACI-1 =

Brazilian satellite

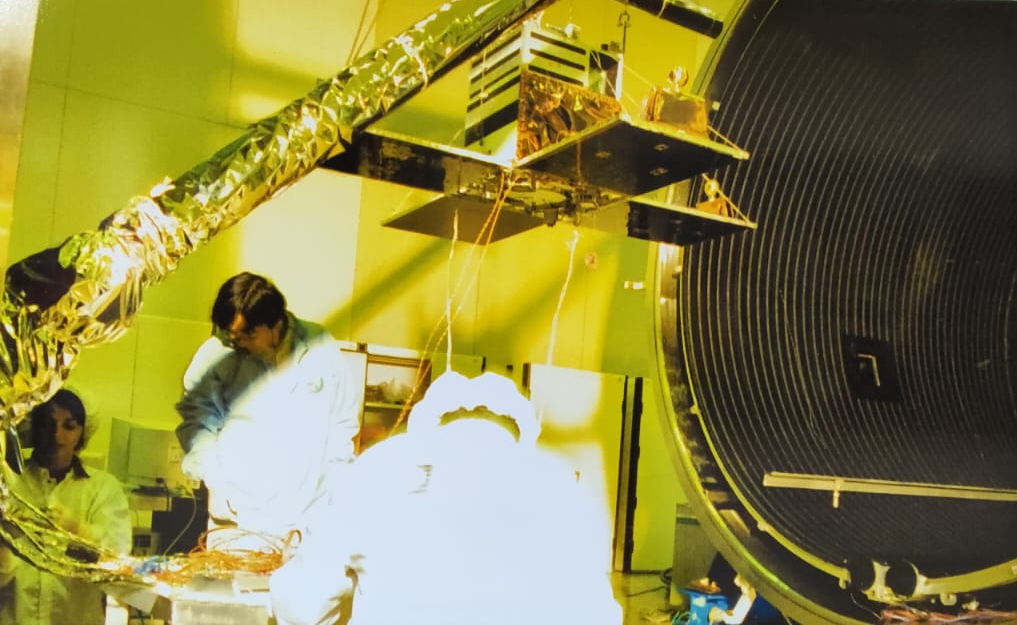
- SACI satellite being tested
- Mission type: Earth orbiter
- Operator: INPE
- COSPAR ID: 1999-057B
- SATCAT no.: 25941

Spacecraft properties
- Manufacturer: INPE
- Launch mass: 60 kilograms (130 lb)
- Power: 150 watts

Start of mission
- Launch date: October 14, 1999
- Rocket: Long March 4B
- Launch site: Taiyuan LC-7

Orbital parameters
- Reference system: Geocentric
- Regime: Sun-synchronous
- Semi-major axis: 7,098 kilometres (4,410 mi)
- Eccentricity: 0.00084
- Perigee altitude: 733 kilometres (455 mi)
- Apogee altitude: 745 kilometres (463 mi)
- Inclination: 98.6°
- Period: 99.6 minutes
- Epoch: Planned

The SACI-1 was a microsatellite of scientific applications, designed, developed, constructed and tested by Brazilian technicians, engineers and scientists working in INPE (National Institute of Space Research). SACI-1 was launched on October 14, 1999, from the Taiyuan Satellite Launch Center, China, by means of a Long March 4B rocket, as a secondary payload at the CBERS-1 launch.

== Features ==
The "SACI" satellites are composed of a multi-mission platform and a set of experiments that constitute the payload. These satellites had the cooperation of several Brazilian and foreign institutions.

The SACI-1 scientific satellite has the following characteristics:

- Format: parallelepiped with 60 cm x 40 cm x 40 cm
- Mass: 60 kg
- Orbit: heliosynchronous
- Stabilization: by rotation (6 rpm)
- Precision: 1 degree

=== Energy supply ===
- Solar Cells: Gallium Arsenide (AsGa)
- Dimensions: 3 panels of 57 x 44 cm
- Efficiency: 19%
- Power output: 150W
- Nickel Cadmium (NiCd) Battery Cells
- Voltage: 1.4 V
- Capacity: 4.5 Ah
- Remote control rate: 19.2 kbit/s
- Transmission rate: 500 kbit/s
- Antennas of edge: 2 of transmission and 2 of reception, type Microstrip
- Operating frequency telemetry / remote control: 2,250 GHz / 2,028 GHz
- Receiving antenna in Soil: 3.4 m in diameter

== Mission ==
Although the launch went smoothly, and the intended orbit reached, SACI-1 did not come into operation, probably due to a failure in the solar panel control system.
