= Gaofen =

Chinese earth imaging satellites

Gaofen Weixing
- 高分; Gāo Fēn
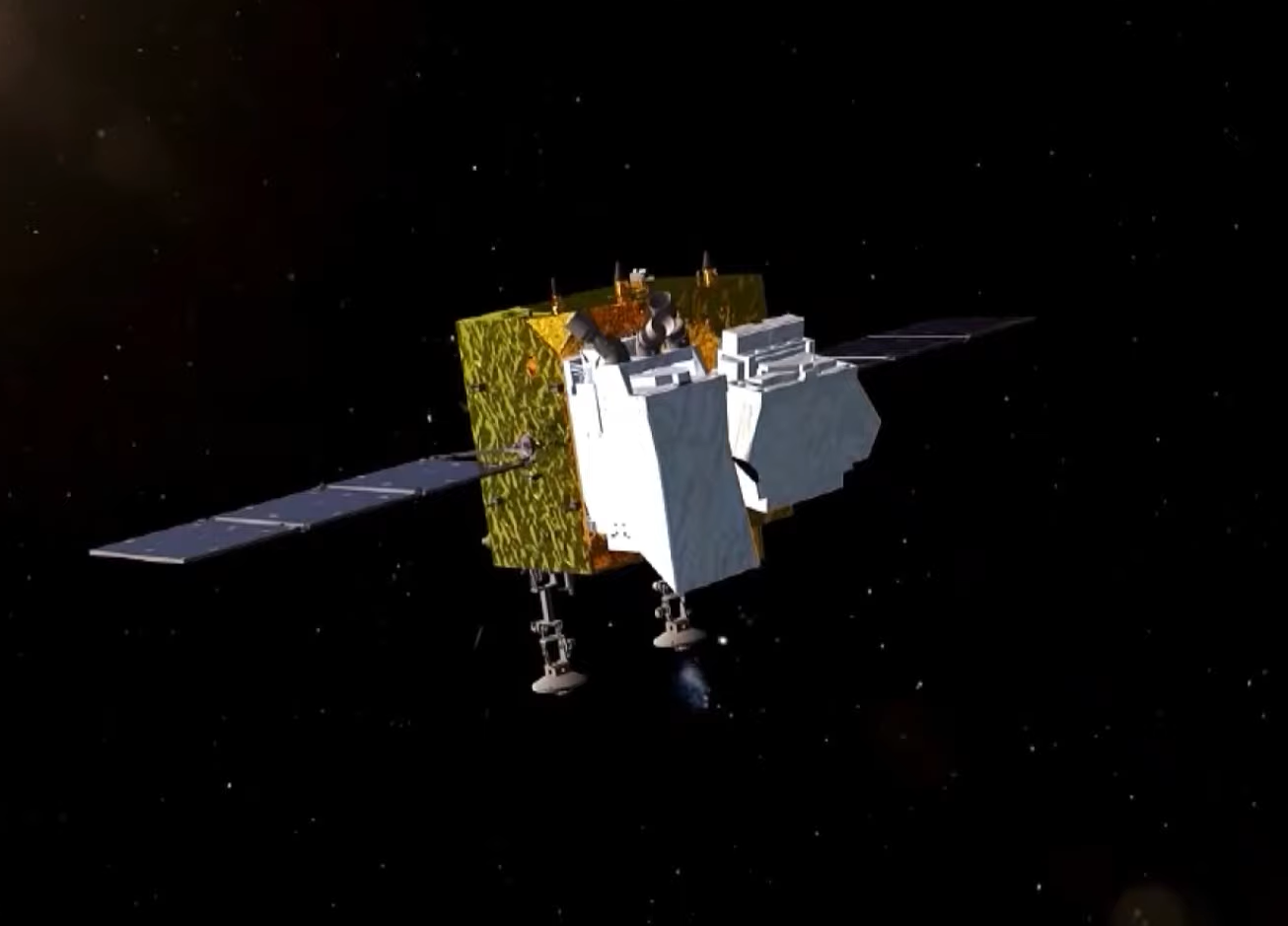

Program overview
- Country: China
- Status: Active

Program history
- First flight: 26 April 2013
- Last flight: 15 October 2024
- Successes: 34
- Failures: 1
- Launch sites: TSLC; JSLC; XSLC

Vehicle information
- Launch vehicles: Long March 2D; Long March 3B; Long March 4B; Long March 4C; Kuaizhou-1A; Long March 11H

Gaofen (Chinese: 高分; pinyin: Gāofēn; lit. 'high resolution') is a series of Chinese high-resolution Earth imaging satellites launched as part of the China High-resolution Earth Observation System (CHEOS) program. CHEOS is a state-sponsored, civilian Earth-observation program used for agricultural, disaster, resource, and environmental monitoring. Proposed in 2006 and approved in 2010, the CHEOS program consists of the Gaofen series of space-based satellites, near-space and airborne systems such as airships and UAVs, ground systems that conduct data receipt, processing, calibration, and taskings, and a system of applications that fuse observation data with other sources to produce usable information and knowledge.

Although the first seven Gaofen satellites and their payloads have been heavily detailed, little to no details on Gaofen 8 and later satellites have been revealed prompting suggestions that Gaofen satellites may be dual purpose supporting both civilian and military missions.

In 2003, the China National Space Administration (CNSA) agreed with Roscosmos to share Gaofen data for data from Russia's Earth observation satellites of similar capability. This agreement was expanded in August 2021 when leaders from BRICS space agencies agreed to share space-based remote sensing data.

== Notable satellites ==
=== Gaofen-5 ===
Gaofen-5 has been lauded as the "flagship of the environment and atmosphere observation satellite in the CHEOS program". Launched on 8 May 2018 from Taiyuan Satellite Launch Center (TSLC) into Sun-synchronous orbit, Gaofen-5 carries six payloads: an Advanced Hyperspectral Imagery sensor (AHSI), Atmospheric Infrared Ultraspectral Sensor (AIUS), Directional Polarization Camera (DPC), Environment Monitoring Instrument (EMI), Greenhouse-gases Monitoring Instrument (GMI), and Visual and Infrared Multispectral Sensor (VIMS).

The Advanced Hyperspectral Imagery (AHSI) sensor payload aboard Gaofen-5 claims to be the first space-based hyperspectral imaging sensor utilizing both convex grating spectrophotometry and a three concentric-mirror (Offner) configuration. The AHSI uses spectrophotometry to measure the light spectra reflected, transmitted, or emitted by an imaged object to detect or identify objects on the ground. In civilian applications, the AHSI allows analysts to conduct environmental monitoring and resource discovery while in a military application would allow analysts to detect and identify an adversary's equipment or spot non-multi-spectral camouflage. AHSI has a 30 meter spatial resolution and 5 nanometer spectral resolution in the visible, near-infrared (NIR), and short-wave infrared (SWIR) wavelength ranges.

The Atmospheric Infrared Ultraspectral Sensor (AIUS) payload aboard Gaofen-5 is China's first hyperspectral occultation spectrometer meaning it measures the spectra of imaged atmospheric particles between the sensor and the Sun. AIUS allows scientists to monitor atmospheric circulation by tracing H_{2}O (water vapor), temperature, pressure, and various carbon and halogen-containing gas pollutants such as chlorofluorocarbons (CFCs), dinitrogen pentoxide, and chlorine nitrate. A Michelson interferometer, AIUS images wavelengths between 2.4 and 13.3 micrometers (near to mid-wave infrared) at a 0.3 centimeter resolution and a ±10° field of view.

Gaofen-5's Directional Polarimetric Camera (DPC) is China's first space-based multi-angle polarimetric camera. Prior to GF-5's launch, in September 2016, China had experimented with polarimetric imaging in 2016 aboard the Tiangong-2 space laboratory and launched its Cloud and Aerosol Polarimetric Imager (CAPI) aboard TanSat in December of that year. CAPI imaged clouds within 670 and 1640 nanometer channels but was restricted to fixed-angle imaging. The DPC aboard Gaofen-5 enables atmospheric spectroscopy in three polarized bands (90, 670, and 865 nm; polarized at 0°, 60°, and 120°) and five non-polarized bands (443, 565, 763, 765, and 910 nm), all wavelengths from green to near-infrared (NIR). A step motor rotates the 512 × 512 pixel charge-coupled device (CCD) imager ±50° providing a 1,850 km swath of imagery at 3.3 km resolution.

== Satellites ==
Since the program's start in 2013, the People's Republic of China has launched 32 Gaofen-series satellites with only one launch failure. Jilin-1 satellites described as 'Gaofen' are not part of the government's Gaofen series, rather are described as having high resolution (Chinese: 高分; pinyin: Gāofēn).

Designation	Launch date (UTC)	Payloads	Orbit	Orbital apsis	Inclination	SCN	COSPAR ID	Launch vehicle	Launch site	Status
Gaofen 1	26 April 2013	2m PAN, 8m MSI, 4x 16m WFV MSI	SSO	632.8 km × 662.7 km	98.1°	39150	2013-018A	Long March 2D	Jiuquan SLC	Operational
Gaofen 2	19 August 2014	0.8m PAN, 3.2m MSI	SSO	630.5 km × 638.0 km	97.7°	40118	2014-049A	Long March 4B	Taiyuan SLC	Operational
Gaofen 8	26 June 2015	EO	SSO	501.7 km × 504.5 km	97.6°	40701	2015-030A	Long March 4B	Taiyuan SLC	Operational
Gaofen 9-01	14 September 2015	EO	SSO	624.5 km × 671.3 km	97.8°	40894	2015-047A	Long March 2D	Jiuquan SLC	Operational
Gaofen 4	28 December 2015	50m VIS, 400m MWIR	GEO	35,782.4 km × 35,806.4 km	0.1°	41194	2015-083A	Long March 3B	Xichang SLC	Operational
Gaofen 3	9 August 2016	C-band SAR	SSO	757.9 km × 758.8 km	98.4°	41727	2016-049A	Long March 4C	Taiyuan SLC	Operational
Gaofen 10	31 August 2016	Unknown	SSO (planned)	N/A	N/A	N/A	2016-F01	Long March 4C	Taiyuan SLC	Launch failure
Gaofen 1-02	31 March 2018	2m PAN, 8m MSI, 4x 16m WFV MSI	SSO	645.4 km × 649.0 km	97.9°	43259	2018-031A	Long March 4C	Taiyuan SLC	Operational
Gaofen 1-03	31 March 2018	2m PAN, 8m MSI, 4x 16m WFV MSI	SSO	642.9 km × 651.9 km	97.9°	43260	2018-031B	Long March 4C	Taiyuan SLC	Operational
Gaofen 1-04	31 March 2018	2m PAN, 8m MSI, 4x 16m WFV MSI	SSO	644.3 km × 650.5 km	97.9°	43262	2018-031D	Long March 4C	Taiyuan SLC	Operational
Gaofen 5	8 May 2018	303km POL MSI, 0.3cm HSI, 30m HSI	SSO	706.2 km × 707.0 km	98.3°	43461	2018-043A	Long March 4C	Taiyuan SLC	Operational
Gaofen 6	2 June 2018	MSI	SSO	641.0 km × 654.3 km	97.9°	43484	2018-048A	Long March 2D	Jiuquan SLC	Operational
Gaofen 11-01	31 July 2018	EO	SSO	493.1 km × 512.5 km	97.6°	43585	2018-063A	Long March 4B	Taiyuan SLC	Operational
Gaofen 10R	4 October 2019	Unknown	SSO	632.0 km × 634.4 km	97.9°	44622	2019-066A	Long March 4C	Taiyuan SLC	Operational
Gaofen 7	3 November 2019	2x 0.8m PAN, 2.5m MSI	SSO	500.7 km × 517.9 km	97.4°	44703	2019-072A	Long March 4B	Taiyuan SLC	Operational
Gaofen 12	27 November 2019	SAR	SSO	634.4 km × 636.5 km	97.9°	44819	2019-082A	Long March 4C	Taiyuan SLC	Operational
Gaofen 9-02	31 May 2020	EO	SSO	493.9 km × 511.3 km	97.4°	45625	2020-034B	Long March 2D	Jiuquan SLC	Operational
Gaofen 9-03	17 June 2020	EO	SSO	491.5 km × 513.9 km	97.4°	45794	2020-039A	Long March 2D	Jiuquan SLC	Operational
Gaofen DUOMO	3 July 2020	EO	SSO	635.5 km × 657.6 km	97.9°	45856	2020-042A	Long March 4B	Taiyuan SLC	Operational
Gaofen 9-04	6 August 2020	EO	SSO	497.9 km × 506.4 km	94.4°	46025	2020-054A	Long March 2D	Jiuquan SLC	Operational
Gaofen 9-05	23 August 2020	EO	SSO	493.5 km × 511.9 km	97.4°	46232	2020-058A	Long March 2D	Jiuquan SLC	Operational
Gaofen 11-02	7 September 2020	EO	SSO	500.7 km × 505.2 km	97.4°	46396	2020-064A	Long March 4B	Taiyuan SLC	Operational
Gaofen 13	11 October 2020	50m VIS, 400m MWIR	GEO	35,782.5 km × 35,806.1 km	0.2°	46610	2020-071A	Long March 3B	Xichang SLC	Operational
Gaofen 14	6 December 2020	EO	SSO	492.9 km × 198.4 km	97.4°	47231	2020-092A	Long March 3B/G5	Xichang SLC	Operational
Gaofen 12-02	30 March 2021	SAR	SSO	634.7 km × 636.6 km	97.9°	48079	2021-026A	Long March 4C	Jiuquan SLC	Operational
Gaofen 5-02	7 September 2021	303km POL MSI, 0.3cm HSI, 30m HSI	SSO	705.4 km × 710.2 km	98.2°	49122	2021-079A	Long March 4C	Taiyuan SLC	Operational
Gaofen 11-03	20 November 2021	EO	SSO	498.6 km × 504.8 km	97.4°	49492	2021-107A	Long March 4B	Taiyuan SLC	Operational
Gaofen 3-02	22 November 2021	C-band SAR	SSO	757.5 km × 759.2 km	98.4°	49495	2021-109A	Long March 4C	Jiuquan SLC	Operational
Gaofen 3-03	6 April 2022	C-band SAR	SSO	757.8 km × 758.9 km	98.4°	52200	2022-035A	Long March 4C	Jiuquan SLC	Operational
Gaofen 12-03	27 June 2022	SAR	SSO	633.3 km × 367.1 km	98.0°	52912	2022-069A	Long March 4C	Jiuquan SLC	Operational
Gaofen 5-01A	8 December 2022	HSI	SSO	706.1 km × 709.0 km	98.1°	54640	2022-165A	Long March 2D	Taiyuan SLC	Operational
Gaofen 11-04	27 December 2022	EO	SSO	498.6 km × 504.8 km	97.4°	54818	2022-176A	Long March 4B	Taiyuan SLC	Operational
Gaofen 13-02	17 March 2023	Unknown	GTO	35,788.4 km × 35,802.1 km	3.0°	55912	2023-036A	Long March 3B/E	Xichang SLC	Operational
Gaofen 12-04	20 August 2023	SAR	SSO	626 km × 630 km	97.9°	57654	2023-132A	Long March 4C	Jiuquan SLC	Operational
Gaofen 11-05	19 July 2024	EO	SSO					Long March 4B	Taiyuan SLC	Operational
Gaofen 12-05	15 October 2024	SAR	SSO					Long March 4C	Jiuquan SLC	Operational
Table data sourced from previously cited references, CelesTrak, N2YO, NASA, and the U.S. Space Force

== See also ==
- Yaogan
- Jilin-1
- Shijian
- China Siwei
- Fengyun
