= CBERS-4 =

Chinese-Brazilian remote sensing satellite

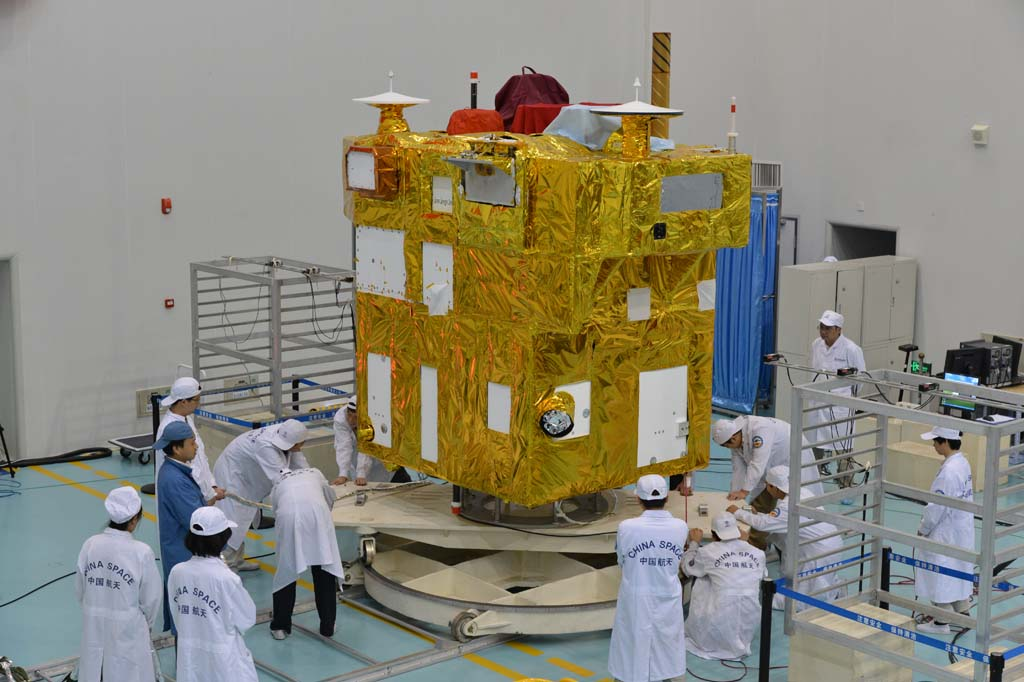
- Mission type: Remote sensing
- Operator: CNSA / INPE
- COSPAR ID: 2014-079A
- SATCAT no.: 40336
- Website: CBERS-4
- Mission duration: 3 years planned

Spacecraft properties
- Spacecraft type: CBERS
- Bus: Phoenix-Eye 1
- Launch mass: 1,980 kilograms (4,370 pounds)
- Power: 2,300 watts

Start of mission
- Launch date: 7 December 2014, 03:26 UTC
- Rocket: Chang Zheng 4B
- Launch site: Taiyuan Satellite Launch Center LC-9

Orbital parameters
- Reference system: Geocentric
- Regime: Sun-synchronous
- Semi-major axis: 7,151.60 kilometers (4,443.80 miles)
- Eccentricity: 0.0001633
- Perigee altitude: 779 kilometers (484 miles)
- Apogee altitude: 781 kilometers (485 miles)
- Inclination: 98.54 degrees
- Period: 100.32 minutes
- Epoch: 25 January 2015, 09:18:29 UTC
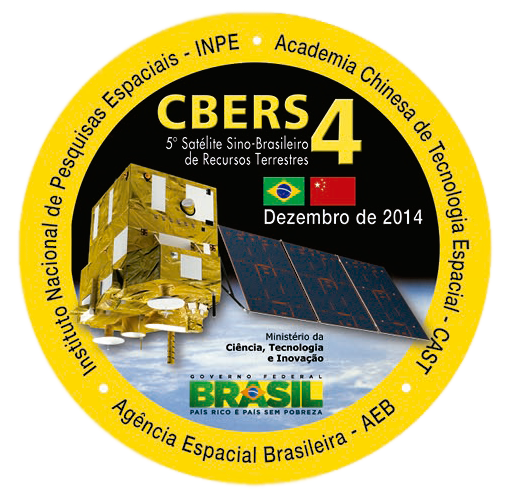

China–Brazil Earth Resources Satellite 4 (CBERS-4), also known as Ziyuan I-04 or Ziyuan 1E, is a remote sensing satellite intended for operation as part of the China–Brazil Earth Resources Satellite program between the Chinese Center for Resources Satellite Data and Application and Brazilian National Institute for Space Research. The fifth CBERS satellite to fly, it was successfully launched on 7 December 2014. It replaces CBERS-3 which was lost in a launch failure in December 2013.

== Spacecraft ==
CBERS-4 is a 1,980-kilogram (4,370 lb) spacecraft based on the Phoenix-Eye 1 satellite bus. It was developed by the China Academy of Space Technology, in partnership with Brazil, at a cost of US$125 million for each party. The spacecraft have a single solar array which provides power to its systems, generating 2,300 watts of electrical power, and have a design life of three years.

The CBERS-4 spacecraft carries four instruments: MUXCam, a multispectral camera; PanMUX, a panchromatic imager; the Infrared Medium Resolution Scanner, or IRSCAM, and WFICAM, a wide-field imaging camera. These cameras will be used to observe a swath of 120 kilometres (75 mi) of landmass at a time, enabling the satellite to scan the entire surface of the planet every 26 days, with a spatial resolution of up to 20 metres (66 ft).

CBERS-4 was initially scheduled to be launched in 2015, however after the loss of CBERS-3 at launch in December 2013, China and Brazil agreed to accelerate the production of CBERS-4 by 1 year. The satellite will restore the Brazilian government's ability to observe its own territory following a 4.5-year gap caused by the failure of CBERS-2B and CBERS-3.

== Launch ==
A Chang Zheng 4B carrier rocket was used to launch CBERS-4. The launch took place at 03:26 UTC on 7 December 2014, using Launch Complex 9 at the Taiyuan Satellite Launch Center. The satellite was successfully placed into a Sun-synchronous orbit.

== Gallery ==
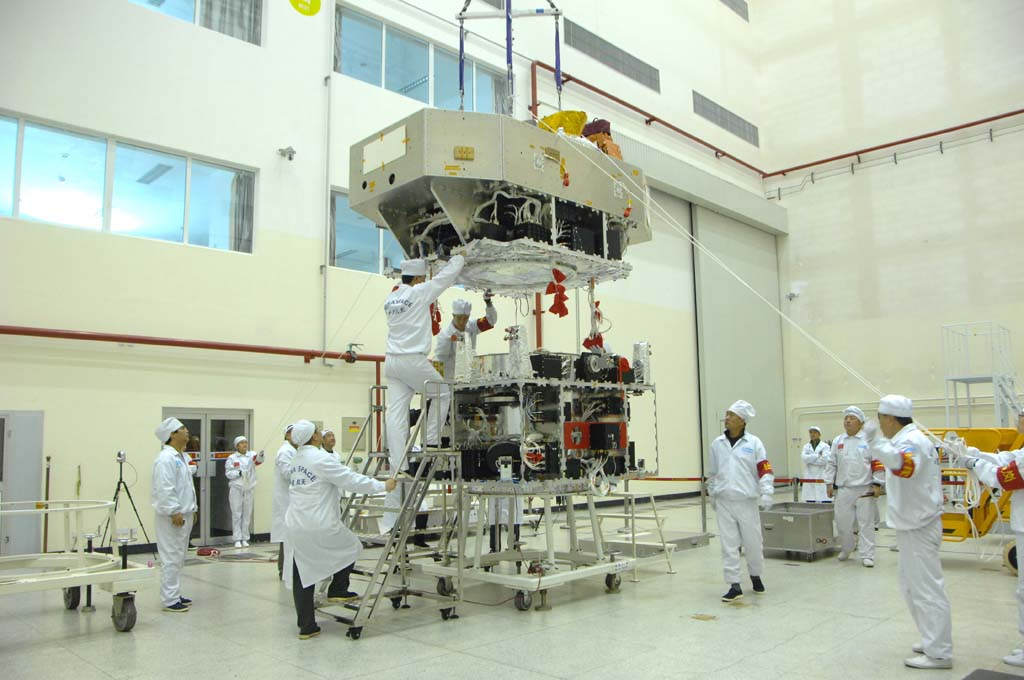

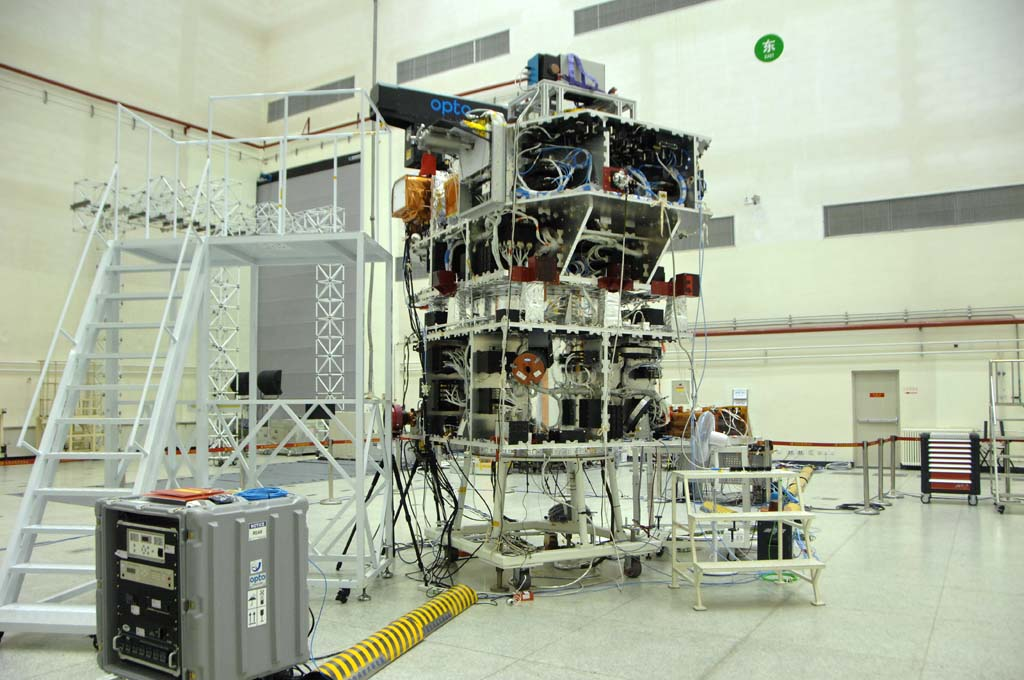

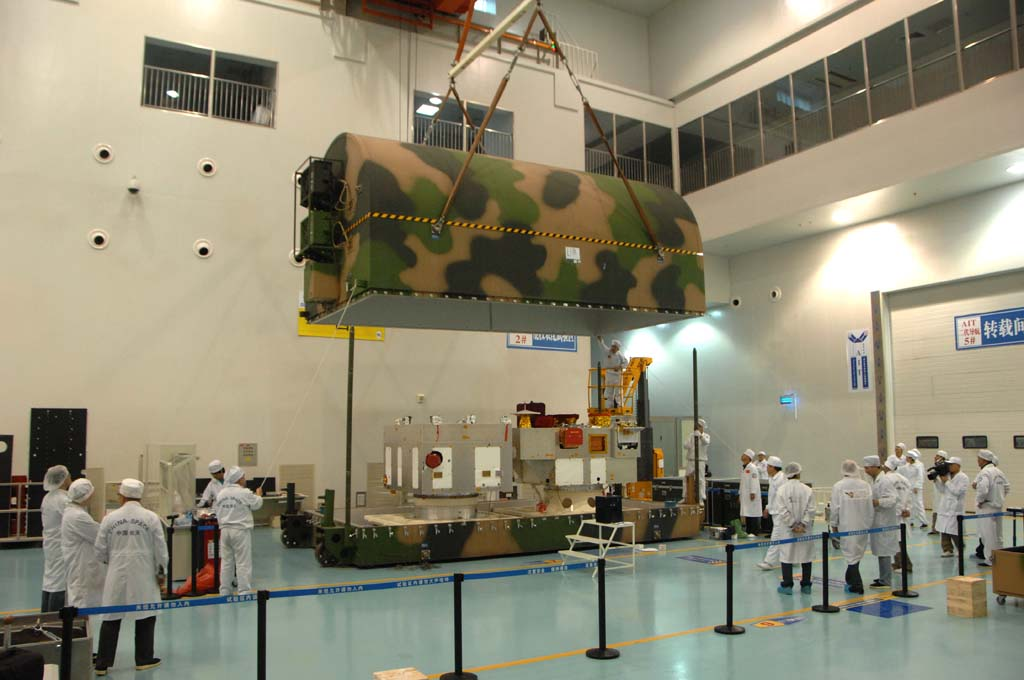

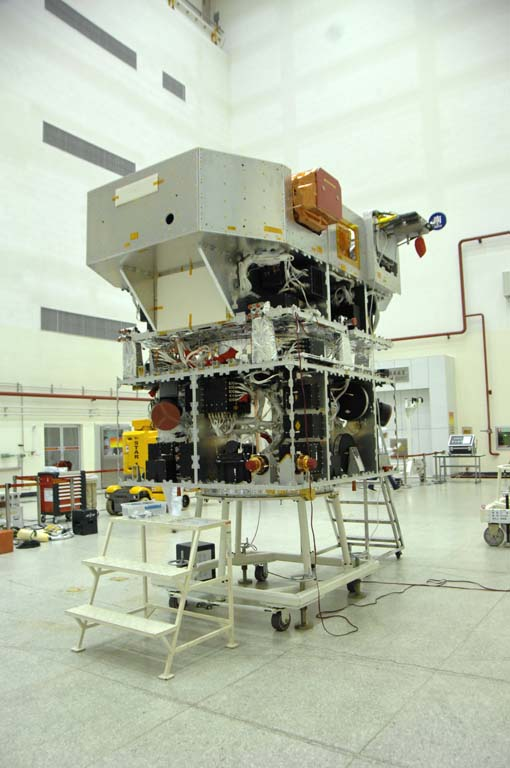

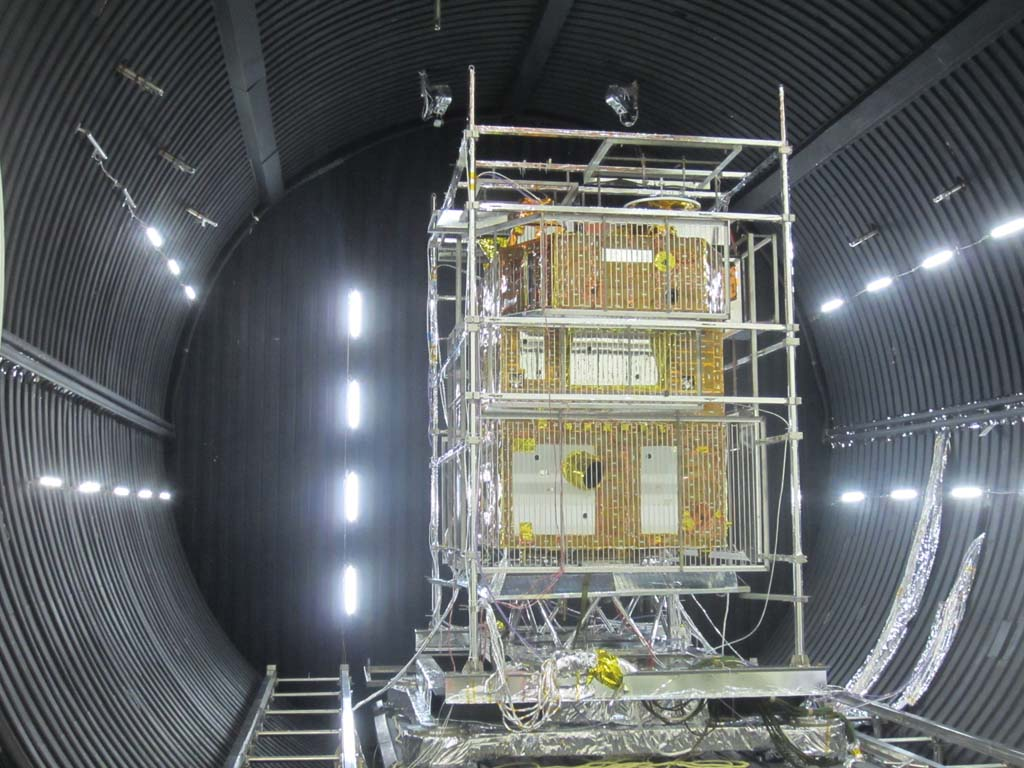

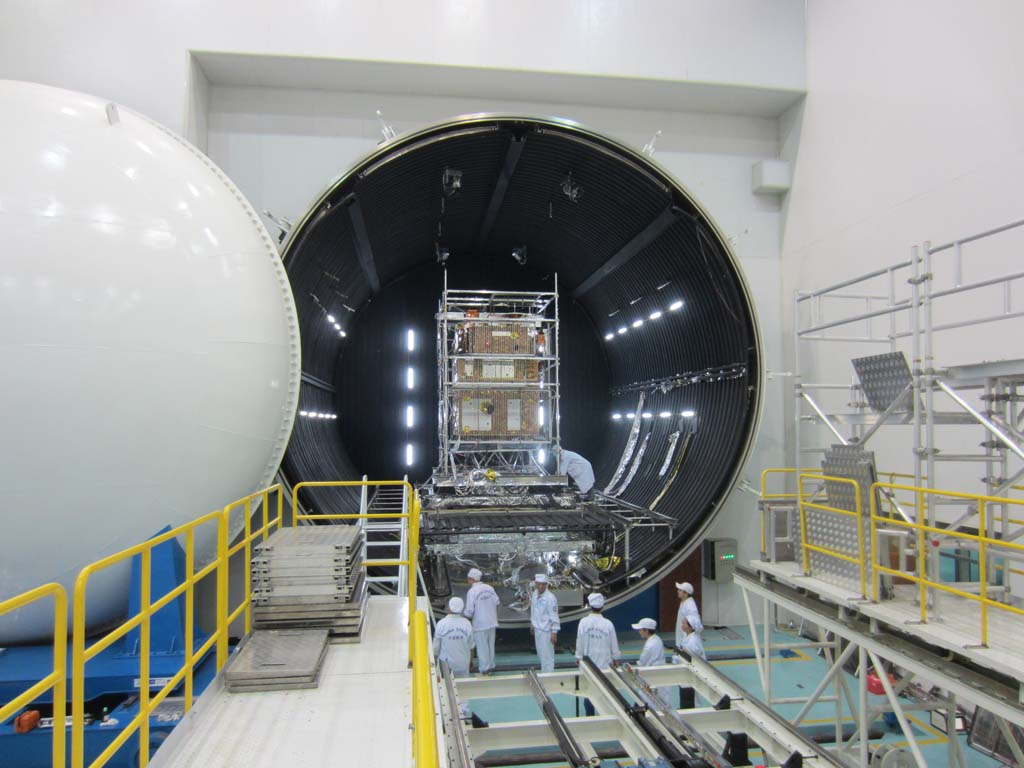

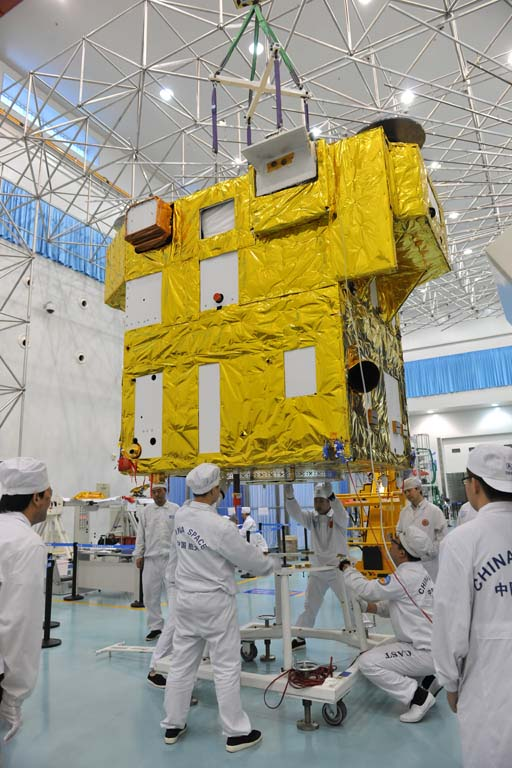

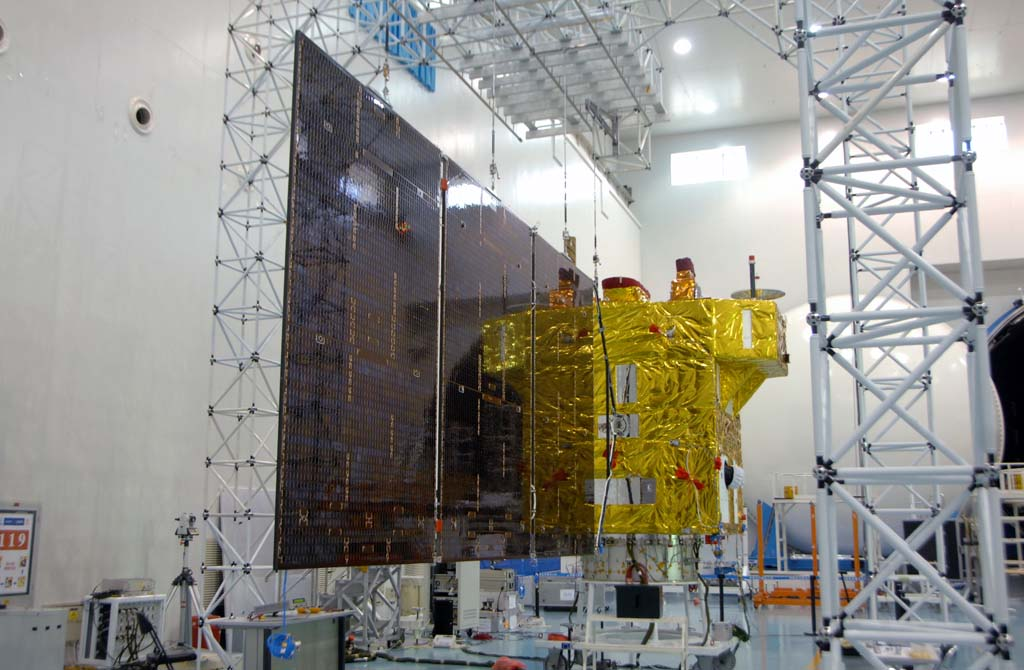

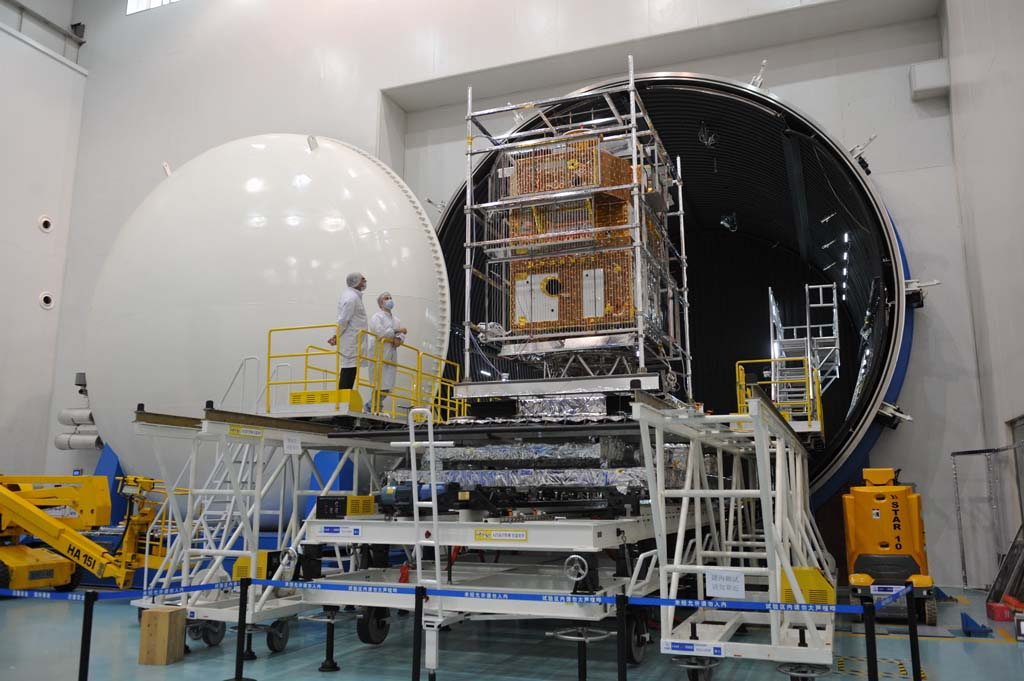

== See also ==
- 2014 in spaceflight
