= CBERS-3 =

Chinese-Brazilian remote sensing satellite

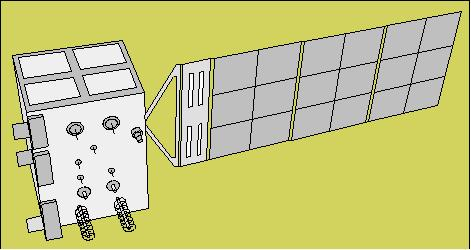
- Mission type: Remote sensing
- Operator: CNSA / INPE
- Website: China–Brazil Earth Resources Satellite program
- Mission duration: 3 years planned Launch failure

Spacecraft properties
- Spacecraft type: CBERS
- Bus: Phoenix-Eye 1
- Launch mass: 1,980 kilograms (4,370 pounds)
- Power: 2,300 watts

Start of mission
- Launch date: 9 December 2013, 03:26 UTC
- Rocket: Chang Zheng 4B
- Launch site: Taiyuan Satellite Launch Center LC-9

Orbital parameters
- Reference system: Geocentric
- Regime: Sun-synchronous
- Eccentricity: 0.0
- Perigee altitude: 1,252 kilometers (778 miles)
- Apogee altitude: 1,252 km (778 mi)
- Inclination: 98.5 degrees
- Period: 100.0 minutes
- Epoch: Planned
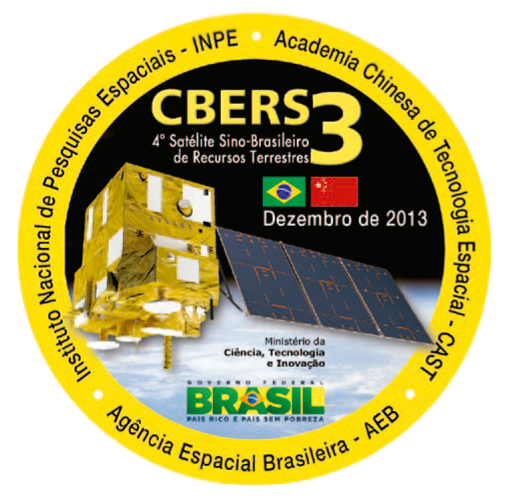

China–Brazil Earth Resources Satellite 3 (CBERS-3), also known as Ziyuan I-03 or Ziyuan 1D, was a remote sensing satellite intended for operation as part of the China–Brazil Earth Resources Satellite program between the Chinese Center for Resources Satellite Data and Application and Brazilian National Institute for Space Research. The fourth CBERS satellite to fly, it was lost in a launch failure in December 2013.

== Spacecraft ==
CBERS-3 was a 1,980-kilogram (4,370 lb) spacecraft based on the Phoenix-Eye 1 satellite bus. It was developed by the China Academy of Space Technology, in partnership with Brazil, at a cost of US$125 million for each party. The spacecraft had a single solar array which would have provided power to its systems, generating 2,300 watts of electrical power, and had a design life of three years.

The CBERS-3 spacecraft carried four instruments: MUXCam, a multispectral camera; PanMUX, a panchromatic imager; the Infrared Medium Resolution Scanner, or IRSCAM, and WFICAM, a wide-field imaging camera. These cameras were to have been used to observe a swath of 120 kilometers (75 miles) of landmass at a time, enabling the satellite to scan the entire surface of the planet every 26 days, with a spatial resolution of up to 20 meters (66 feet).

CBERS-3 was initially scheduled to be launched in 2010, however delays in its deployment, including failures in the electric conversion system, caused it to slip to 2013. The satellite would have restored the Brazilian government's ability to observe its own territory following a three-and-a-half-year gap caused by the failure of CBERS-2B. One of the objectives of the CBERS-3 satellite's mission was to help monitor the process of deforestation of the Amazon Rainforest.

== Launch failure ==
A Chang Zheng 4B carrier rocket was used to launch CBERS-3. The launch took place at 03:26 UTC on 9 December 2013, using Launch Complex 9 at the Taiyuan Satellite Launch Center. The satellite was intended to be placed into a Sun-synchronous orbit, however the rocket malfunctioned, resulting in the loss of the satellite. China has begun an investigation into the causes of the failure.

In response to the failure, China and Brazil have called for an extraordinary committee meeting to discuss the causes for the accident, next steps to be taken in the program and the acceleration the development and deployment of the CBERS-4 satellite, which had originally been scheduled for launch in 2015.
