= Ziyuan 3-01 =

Chinese Earth observation satellite

- Mission type: Earth observation
- Operator: Ministry of Natural Resources
- COSPAR ID: 2012-001A
- SATCAT no.: 38046
- Mission duration: 4-5 years

Spacecraft properties
- Manufacturer: CAST (spacecraft); CIOMP (payload)
- Launch mass: 2630 kg

Start of mission
- Launch date: 9 January 2012, 03:17:00 UTC
- Rocket: Chang Zheng 4B Y26
- Launch site: Taiyuan, LC-9
- Contractor: SAST

Orbital parameters
- Reference system: Geocentric orbit
- Regime: Sun-synchronous orbit
- Perigee altitude: 505 km
- Apogee altitude: 512 km
- Inclination: 97.4°
- Period: 94.65 minutes
- Epoch: 9 January 2012

Ziyuan 3-01 or ZY 3-01 (Chinese: 资源三号 meaning Resources 3) is a Chinese Earth observation satellite launched in January 2012. It is a high-resolution imaging satellite operated by the Ministry of Land and Resources of the People's Republic of China.

== Spacecraft ==
The Ziyuan 3 satellite was constructed by the China's China Academy of Space Technology (CAST), and carries three cameras produced by the Changchun Institute of Optics, Fine Machinery and Physics. A camera aligned normal to the Earth's surface will produce images with a spatial resolution of 2.5 metres (8 ft 2 in), whilst the other two, offset at 22° forward and aft, have spatial resolutions of 4.0 metres (13.1 ft). In addition to the three cameras, Ziyuan-3 carries an infrared multispectral spectrometer, with a spectral resolution of 6.0 metres (19.7 ft). The satellite is used to provide imagery to monitor resources, land use and ecology, and for use in urban planning and disaster management. It had a mass at launch of 2,630 kilograms (5,800 lb). The satellite has a planned operational lifetime of 4 years with a possible extension to 5 years.

Ziyuan 3-01 was China's first independent civilian high-resolution 3D mapping satellite, and it is used mainly for 1:50,000-scale stereo mapping and for updating some elements of 1:25,000-scale topographic maps. Its three-line camera array consists of three telescopic cameras, one pointing at nadir and two offset 22° forward and backward along the flight path. The forward and backward views form a stereo pair 52 km wide, with a baseline-to-height ratio of 0.85–0.95, which meets the requirements for 1:50,000-scale stereo mapping. According to the figures quoted by ScienceDirect, the nadir camera has a ground sample distance of 2.1 m and the two offset cameras 3.5 m. The satellite also carries a four-band multispectral imager for vegetation and environmental monitoring with a ground resolution of 5.8 m, built around a three-mirror telescope and a cooled detector system.

== Launch ==
Ziyuan 3 was launched by a Long March 4B carrier rocket, flying from Launch Complex 9 at the Taiyuan Satellite Launch Center. The launch occurred at 03:17:00 UTC on 9 January 2012, and was the first orbital launch of the year. VesselSat-2 was launched as a secondary payload on the same rocket.
