= CBERS-2 =

Second satellite cooperation program between China and Brazil

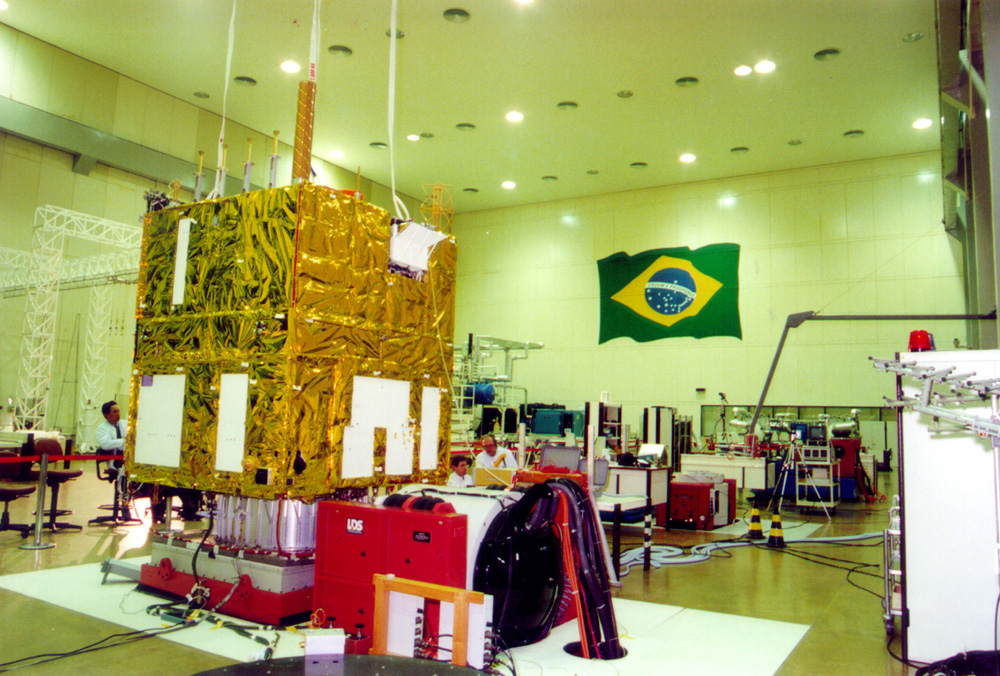
- Mission type: Remote sensing
- Operator: CNSA / INPE
- COSPAR ID: 2003-049A
- SATCAT no.: 28057
- Mission duration: 2 years

Spacecraft properties
- Spacecraft type: CBERS
- Bus: Phoenix-Eye 1
- Launch mass: 1,450 kg (3,200 lb)
- Power: 1,100 watts

Start of mission
- Launch date: 21 October 2003, 03:16 UTC
- Rocket: Chang Zheng 4B
- Launch site: Taiyuan Satellite Launch Center LC-7

End of mission
- Disposal: Decommissioned
- Deactivated: Late 2007

Orbital parameters
- Reference system: Geocentric
- Regime: Sun-synchronous
- Semi-major axis: 7,152.64 km (4,444.44 mi)
- Eccentricity: 0.0001886
- Perigee altitude: 780 kilometres (480 miles)
- Apogee altitude: 782 km (486 mi)
- Inclination: 98.17 degrees
- Period: 100.33 minutes
- Epoch: 1 December 2013, 03:03:10 UTC
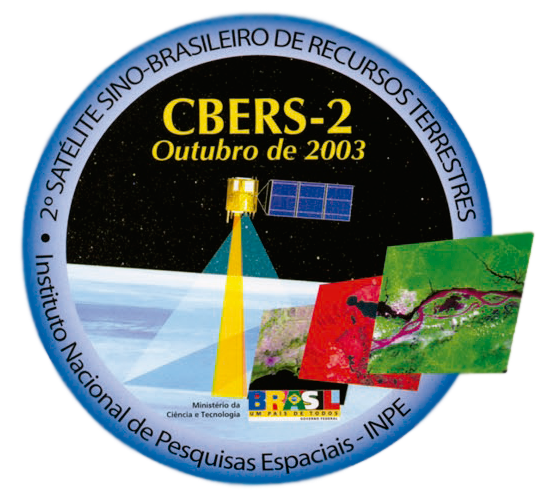

China–Brazil Earth Resources Satellite 2 (CBERS-2), also known as Ziyuan I-02 or Ziyuan 1B, was a remote sensing satellite operated as part of the China–Brazil Earth Resources Satellite program between the Chinese Center for Resources Satellite Data and Application and Brazilian National Institute for Space Research. The second CBERS satellite to fly, it was launched by China in 2003 to replace CBERS-1.

CBERS-2 was a 1,450 kg (3,200 lb) spacecraft built by the China Academy of Space Technology and based on the Phoenix-Eye 1 satellite bus. The spacecraft was powered by a single solar array, which provided 1,100 watts of electricity for the satellite's systems. The instrument suite aboard the CBERS-2 spacecraft consisted of three systems: the Wide Field Imager (WFI) produced visible-light to near-infrared images with a resolution of 260 m (850 ft) and a swath width of 890 km (550 mi); a high-resolution CCD camera was used for multispectral imaging at a resolution of 20 m (66 ft) with a swath width of 113 km (70 mi); the third instrument, the Infrared Multispectral Scanner (IMS), had a resolution of 80 metres (260 ft) and a swath width of 120 km (75 mi).

A Chang Zheng 4B carrier rocket, operated by the China Academy of Launch Vehicle Technology, was used to launch CBERS-2. The launch took place at 03:16 UTC on 21 October 2003, using Launch Complex 7 at the Taiyuan Satellite Launch Center. The satellite was successfully placed into a Sun-synchronous orbit.

Following the launch of CBERS-2B in 2007, CBERS-2 was retired from service. As of 1 December 2013, the dericict satellite remains in orbit, with a perigee of 780 km (480 mi), an apogee of 782 km (486 mi), 98.17 degrees inclination and a period of 100.33 minutes. Its orbit has a semimajor axis of 7,152.64 km (4,444.44 mi), and eccentricity of 0.0001886.
