= Long March 4C =

Chinese orbital launch vehicle

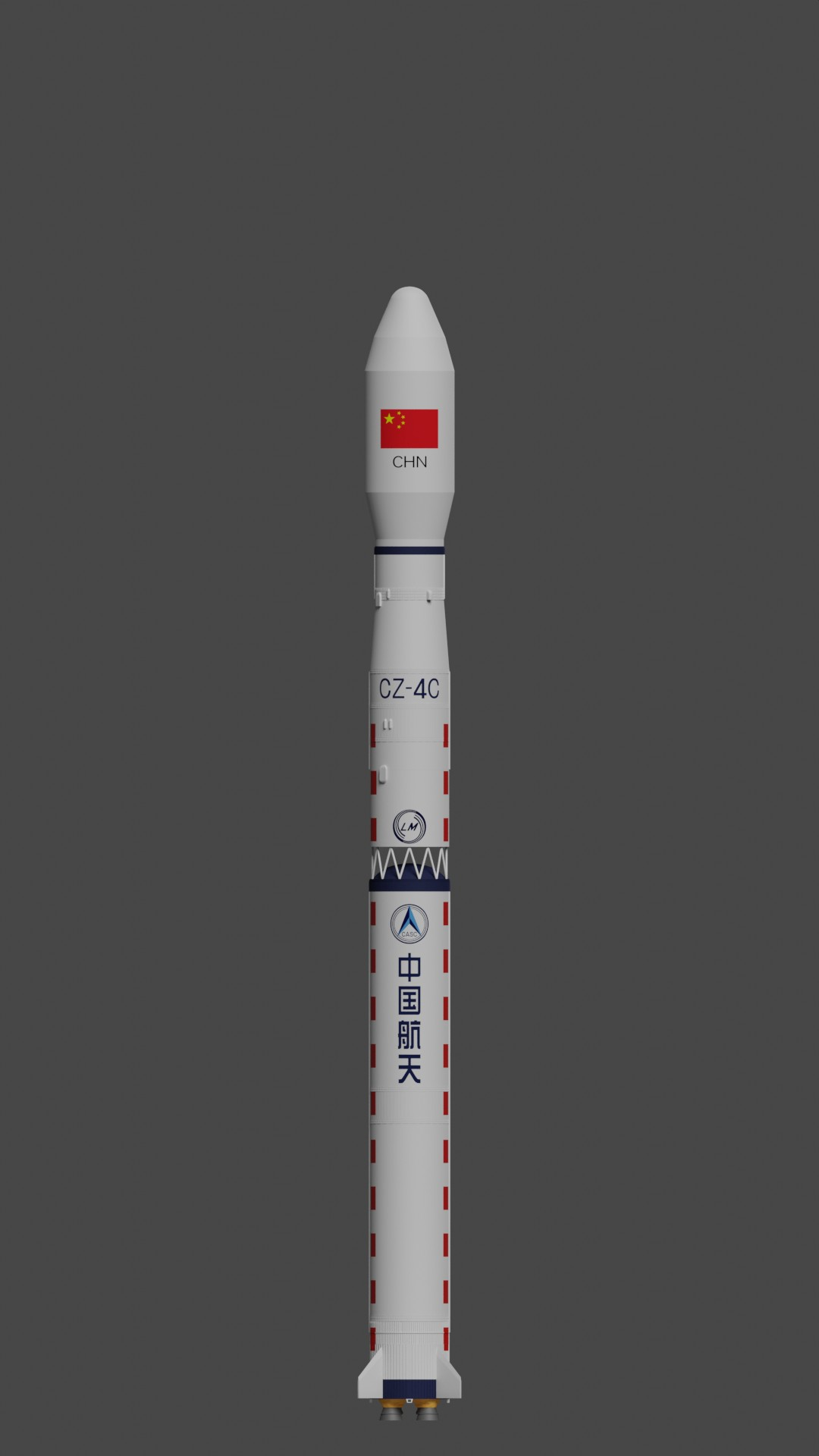
- Rendering of Long March 4C
- Function: Medium-lift launch vehicle
- Manufacturer: Shanghai Academy of Spaceflight Technology
- Country of origin: China

Size
- Height: 45.8 m (150 ft)
- Diameter: 3.35 m (11.0 ft)
- Mass: 250,000 kg (550,000 lb)
- Stages: 3

Capacity

Payload to LEO
- Mass: 4,200 kg (9,300 lb)

Payload to SSO
- Mass: 2,800 kg (6,200 lb)

Payload to GTO
- Mass: 1,500 kg (3,300 lb)

Associated rockets
- Family: Long March

Launch history
- Status: Active
- Launch sites: TSLC, LA-7, LA-9; JSLC, LA-4/SLS-2; XSLC, LA-3
- Total launches: 59
- Success(es): 57
- Failure: 2
- First flight: 26 April 2006
- Last flight: 17 April 2026 (most recent)

First stage
- Height: 27.91 m
- Diameter: 3.35 m
- Propellant mass: 182,000 kg (401,000 lb)
- Powered by: 4 YF-21C
- Maximum thrust: 2,961.6 kN (665,800 lb_{f})
- Specific impulse: 2,550 m/s (8,400 ft/s)
- Propellant: N_{2}O_{4} / UDMH

Second stage
- Height: 10.9 m
- Diameter: 3.35 m
- Propellant mass: 52,700 kg (116,200 lb)
- Powered by: 1 YF-24C (1 x YF-22C (Main)) (4 x YF-23C (Vernier))
- Maximum thrust: 742.04 kN (166,820 lb_{f}) (Main); 47.1 kN (10,600 lb_{f}) (Vernier)
- Specific impulse: 2,942 m/s (9,650 ft/s) (Main); 2,834 m/s (9,300 ft/s) (Vernier)
- Propellant: N_{2}O_{4} / UDMH

Third stage
- Height: 14.79 m
- Diameter: 2.9 m
- Propellant mass: 14,000 kg (31,000 lb)
- Powered by: 2 YF-40A
- Maximum thrust: 100.85 kN (22,670 lb_{f})
- Specific impulse: 2,971 m/s (9,750 ft/s)
- Propellant: N_{2}O_{4} / UDMH

The Long March 4C, also known as the Chang Zheng 4C, CZ-4C and LM-4C, previously designated Long March 4B-II, is a Chinese orbital launch vehicle. It is launched from the Jiuquan, Taiyuan, and Xichang Satellite Launch Centers, and consists of 3 stages. All stages use storable (rather than cryogenic) propellants.

The Long March 4C is derived from the 3 stage Long March 4B, but features a restartable third stage, and a larger payload fairing.

== Launch summary ==
Long March 4C vehicles have been used to launch the Yaogan-1, Yaogan-3 synthetic-aperture radar (SAR) satellites and the Fengyun-3A polar orbiting meteorological satellite. On 15 December 2009, a Long March 4C was used to launch Yaogan-8.

Because it was still designated as Long March 4B-II at the time of its maiden flight, the first launch is often mistaken for a Long March 4B.

On 1 September 2016, the Long March 4C failed for reasons not yet known. A Long March 4C rocket blasted off from the Taiyuan Satellite Launch Center in Shanxi but failed to insert its payload, the Gaofen 10 satellite, into its designated orbit.

== Launch statistics ==
- Failure
- Partial failure
- Success
- Planned

== List of launches ==
Flight number	Serial number	Date (UTC)	Launch site	Payload	Orbit	Result
1	Y1	26 April 2006; 22:48	TSLC, LA-7	Yaogan 1	SSO	Success
2	Y3	11 November 2007; 22:48	TSLC, LA-7	Yaogan 3	SSO	Success
3	Y2	27 May 2008; 03:02	TSLC, LA-7	Fengyun 3A	SSO	Success
4	Y4	15 December 2009; 02:31	TSLC, LA-9	Yaogan 8 Xiwang 1	SSO	Success
5	Y5	5 March 2010; 04:55	JSLC, SLS-2	Yaogan 9A; Yaogan 9B; Yaogan 9C	LEO	Success
6	Y6	9 August 2010; 22:49	TSLC, LA-9	Yaogan 10	SSO	Success
7	Y7	4 November 2010; 18:37	TSLC, LA-9	Fengyun 3B	SSO	Success
8	Y10	29 May 2012; 07:31	TSLC, LA-9	Yaogan 15	SSO	Success
9	Y9	25 November 2012; 04:06	JSLC, SLS-2	Yaogan 16A; Yaogan 16B; Yaogan 16C	LEO	Success
10	Y11	19 July 2013; 23:37	TSLC, LA-9	Shijian 15; Shiyan 7 Chuangxin-3	SSO	Success
11	Y13	1 September 2013; 19:16	JSLC, SLS-2	Yaogan 17A; Yaogan 17B; Yaogan 17C	LEO	Success
12	Y12	23 September 2013; 03:07	TSLC, LA-9	Fengyun 3C	SSO	Success
13	Y14	20 November 2013; 03:31	TSLC, LA-9	Yaogan 19	SSO	Success
14	Y15	9 August 2014; 05:45	JSLC, SLS-2	Yaogan 20A; Yaogan 20B; Yaogan 20C	LEO	Success
15	Y16	20 October 2014; 06:31	TSLC, LA-9	Yaogan 22	SSO	Success
16	Y17	10 December 2014; 19:33	JSLC, SLS-2	Yaogan 25A; Yaogan 25B; Yaogan 25C	LEO	Success
17	Y18	27 August 2015; 02:31	TSLC, LA-9	Yaogan 27	SSO	Success
18	Y8	26 November 2015; 21:24	TSLC, LA-9	Yaogan 29	SSO	Success
19	Y19	9 August 2016; 22:55	TSLC, LA-9	Gaofen 3	SSO	Success
20	Y22	31 August 2016; 18:50	TSLC, LA-9	Gaofen 10	SSO	Failure
21	Y21	14 November 2017; 18:35	TSLC, LA-9	Fengyun 3D; HEAD-1	SSO	Success
22	Y26	31 March 2018; 03:22	TSLC, LA-9	Gaofen-1 02; Gaofen-1 03; Gaofen-1 04	SSO	Success
23	Y25	10 April 2018; 04:25	JSLC, SLS-2	Yaogan 31-01A; Yaogan 31-01B; Yaogan 31-01C	LEO	Success
24	Y20	8 May 2018; 18:28	TSLC, LA-9	Gaofen 5	SSO	Success
25	Y27	20 May 2018; 21:28	XSLC, LA-3	Queqiao; Longjiang-1; Longjiang-2	Earth–Moon L2	Success
26	Y23	22 May 2019; 22:49	TSLC, LA-9	Yaogan 33	SSO	Failure
27	Y33	4 October 2019; 18:51	TSLC, LA-9	Gaofen 10(R)	SSO	Success
28	Y24	27 November 2019; 23:52	TSLC, LA-9	Gaofen 12	SSO	Success
29	Y35	27 December 2020; 15:44	JSLC, SLS-2	Yaogan 33(R)	SSO	Success
30	Y31	29 January 2021; 04:47	JSLC, SLS-2	Yaogan 31-02A; Yaogan 31-02B; Yaogan 31-02C	LEO	Success
31	Y32	24 February 2021; 02:22	JSLC, SLS-2	Yaogan 31-03A; Yaogan 31-03B; Yaogan 31-03C	LEO	Success
32	Y42	13 March 2021; 02:19	JSLC, SLS-2	Yaogan 31-04A; Yaogan 31-04B; Yaogan 31-04C	LEO	Success
33	Y36	30 March 2021; 22:45	JSLC, SLS-2	Gaofen 12-02	SSO	Success
34	Y34	30 April 2021; 07:27	JSLC, SLS-2	Yaogan 34	LEO	Success
35	Y43	4 July 2021; 23:28	JSLC, SLS-2	Fengyun 3E	SSO	Success
36	Y40	7 September 2021; 03:01	TSLC, LA-9	Gaofen 5-02	SSO	Success
37	Y37	22 November 2021; 23:45	JSLC, SLS-2	Gaofen 3-02	SSO	Success
38	Y39	26 December 2021; 03:11	TSLC, LA-9	Ziyuan I-02E; XW-3 (CAS-9)	SSO	Success
39	Y29	25 January 2022; 23:44	JSLC, SLS-2	Ludi Tance-1 01A	SSO	Success
40	Y30	26 February 2022; 23:44	JSLC, SLS-2	Ludi Tance-1 01B	SSO	Success
41	Y47	17 March 2022; 07:09	JSLC, SLS-2	Yaogan 34-02	LEO	Success
42	Y38	6 April 2022; 23:47	JSLC, SLS-2	Gaofen 3-03	SSO	Success
43	Y28	15 April 2022; 18:16	TSLC, LA-9	Daqi-1 (AEMS)	SSO	Success
44	Y46	27 June 2022; 15:46	JSLC, SLS-2	Gaofen 12-03	SSO	Success
45	Y52	2 September 2022; 23:44	JSLC, SLS-2	Yaogan 33-02	SSO	Success
46	Y48	15 November 2022; 01:38	JSLC, SLS-2	Yaogan 34-03	LEO	Success
47	Y57	12 December 2022; 08:22	JSLC, SLS-2	Shiyan-20A; Shiyan-20B	LEO	Success
48	Y51	9 March 2023; 22:41	TSLC, LA-9	Tianhui-6A; Tianhui-6B	SSO	Success
49	Y49	31 March 2023; 06:27	JSLC, SLS-2	Yaogan 34-04	LEO	Success
50	Y44	3 August 2023; 03:47	JSLC, SLS-2	Fengyun 3F	SSO	Success
51	Y56	20 August 2023; 17:45	JSLC, SLS-2	Gaofen 12-04	SSO	Success
52	Y53	6 September 2023; 18:14	JSLC, SLS-2	Yaogan 33-03	SSO	Success
53	Y54	26 September 2023; 20:15	JSLC, SLS-2	Yaogan 33-04	SSO	Success
54	Y50	11 May 2024; 23:43	JSLC, SLS-2	Shiyan-23	SSO	Success
55	Y59	15 October 2024; 23:45	JSLC, SLS-2	Gaofen 12-05	SSO	Success
56	Y63	3 July 2025; 09:35	XSLC, LA-3	Shiyan-28B 01	LEO	Success
57	Y64	17 August 2025; 08:55	XSLC, LA-3	Shiyan-28B 02	LEO	Success
58	Y45	26 September 2025; 19:28	JSLC, SLS-2	Fengyun 3H	SSO	Success
59	Y41	17 April 2026; 04:10	JSLC, SLS-2	Daqi-2 (High-Precision Greenhouse Gas Detection)	SSO	Success

== See also ==
- Long March 4B
- Long March (rocket family)
- Medium-lift launch vehicle
