= Huanjing (satellite) =

Chinese environmental monitoring satellites

China plans to launch eleven Huanjing (Chinese: 环境) satellites for disaster and environmental monitoring ("huanjing" is Chinese for "environment"). The satellites will be capable of visible, infrared, multi-spectral and synthetic-aperture radar imaging.

The first two satellites, Huanjing-1A and Huanjing-1B, were launched on 6 September 2008 on a Long March 2C rocket from the Taiyuan Satellite Launch Center. In a report dated 3 September 2008, the Associated Press of Pakistan indicated the launch would be conducted 5 September 2008 using a Long March 2C launch vehicle. On 5 September 2008, Aviation Week reported the first launch would be of optical imaging satellites.

Huanjing-1C was launched on 16 November 2012 on a Long March 2C rocket from the Taiyuan Satellite Launch Center. It is the first civilian Chinese remote sensing satellite to use a synthetic-aperture radar as imaging instrument. This S-band synthetic-aperture radar (SAR) was manufactured in Russia by NPO Mashinostroyeniya.

The two satellites, Huanjing-2A and Huanjing-2B, were launched on 27 September 2020 at 03:23 UTC on a Long March 4B launch vehicle from the Taiyuan Satellite Launch Center. The satellites "provide services concerning environmental protection, natural resources, water conservancy, agriculture and forestry", Xinhua said.

== Launches ==
Date (UTC)	COSPAR ID	SCN	Launch vehicle	Launch site	Payload	Outcome	Comments
6 September 2008, 03:25	2008-041A; 2008-041B	33320; 33321	Long March 2C	Taiyuan Satellite Launch Center	Huanjing 1A and 1B	Success	
19 November 2012, 22:53	2012-064A	38997	Long March 2C	Taiyuan Satellite Launch Center	Huanjing 1C	Success	Decayed
27 September 2020, 03:23	2020-067A; 2020-067B	46478; 46479	Long March 4B	Taiyuan Satellite Launch Center	Huanjing 2A and 2B	Success	
12 October 2022, 22:53	2022-132A	54035	Long March 2C	Taiyuan Satellite Launch Center	Huanjing 2E	Success	
8 August 2023, 22:53	2023-116A	57519	Long March 2C	Taiyuan Satellite Launch Center	Huanjing 2F	Success	
