= Hard X-ray Modulation Telescope =

X-ray space observatory

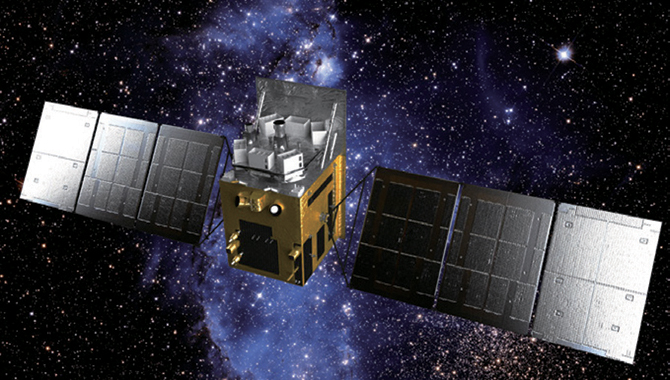
- Rendering of HXMT
- Mission type: Astronomy
- Operator: CAS / IHEP
- COSPAR ID: 2017-034A
- SATCAT no.: 42758
- Website: http://www.hxmt.org/
- Mission duration: Elapsed: 8 years, 11 months, 17 days

Spacecraft properties
- Launch mass: 2,800 kg (6,200 lb)
- Dimensions: 2.0 × 2.0 × 2.8 m (6.6 × 6.6 × 9.2 ft)

Start of mission
- Launch date: June 14, 2017, 03:00:00 UTC
- Rocket: Long March 4B
- Launch site: 603 Launch Pad of the LC43 Launch Complex, Jiuquan Satellite Launch Center

Orbital parameters
- Reference system: Geocentric
- Regime: Low Earth
- Semi-major axis: 6,920 km (4,300 mi)
- Eccentricity: 0.0006597
- Perigee altitude: 545 km (339 mi)
- Apogee altitude: 554.1 km (344.3 mi)
- Inclination: 43.0°
- Period: 95.5 minutes
- Mean motion: 15.079 rev/day
- Epoch: 2017-06-22 11:32:39 UTC

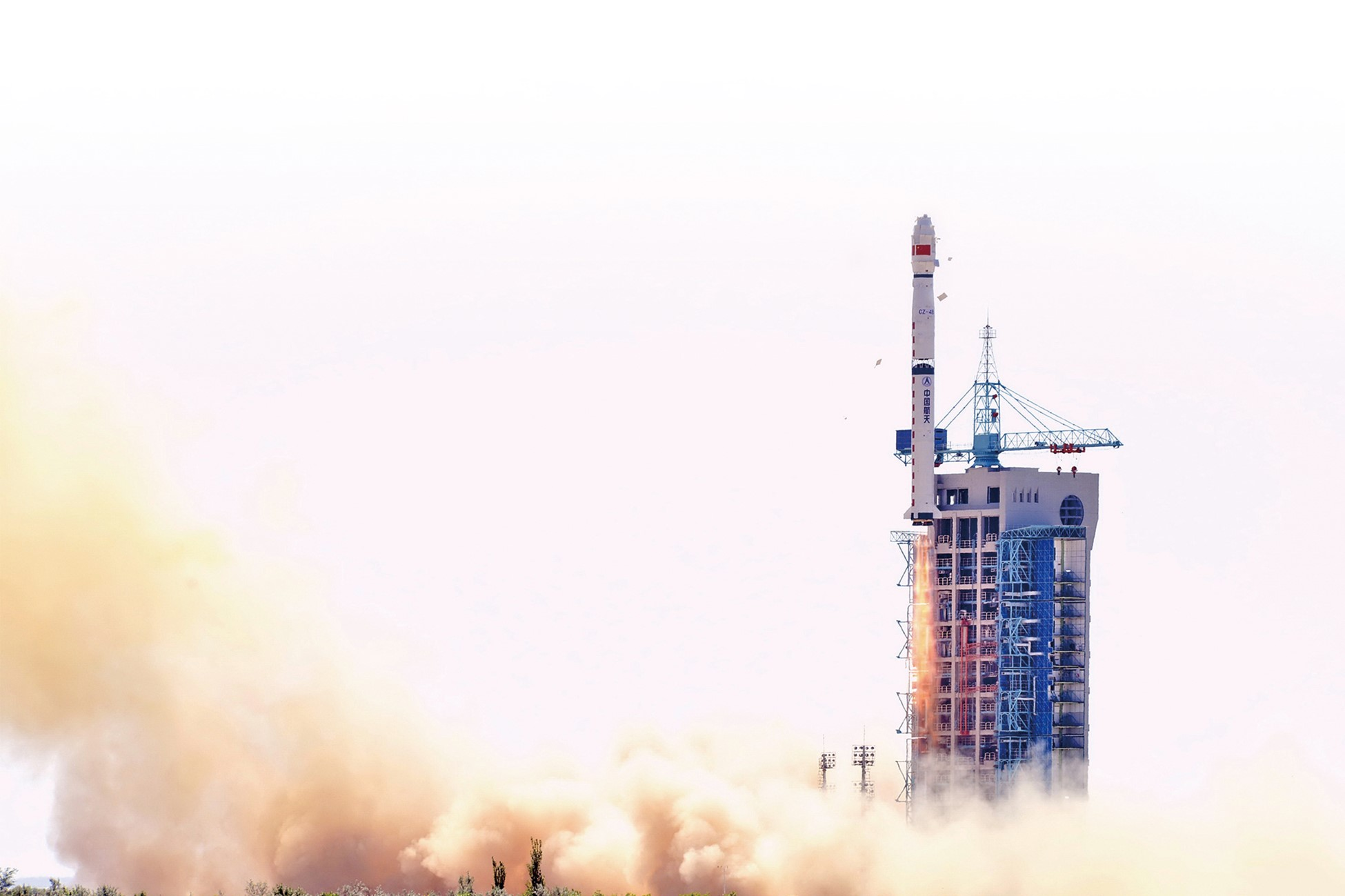
The Hard X-ray Modulation Telescope (HXMT) launch by CZ-4B rocket

Hard X-ray Modulation Telescope (HXMT) also known as Insight (Chinese: 慧眼) is a Chinese X-ray space observatory, launched on June 15, 2017 to observe black holes, neutron stars, active galactic nuclei and other phenomena based on their X-ray and gamma-ray emissions. It is based on the JianBing 3 imagery reconnaissance satellite series platform.

The project, a joint collaboration of the Ministry of Science and Technology of China, the Chinese Academy of Sciences, and Tsinghua University, has been under development since 2000.

== Payload ==
The main scientific instrument is an array of 18 NaI(Tl)/CsI(na) slat-collimated "phoswich" scintillation detectors, collimated to 5.7°×1° overlapping fields of view. The main NaI detectors have an area of 286 cm^{2} each, and cover the 20–200 keV energy range. Data analysis is planned to be by a direct algebraic method, "direct demodulation", which has shown promise in de-convolving the raw data into images while preserving excellent angular and energy resolution.

The satellite has three payloads, the high energy X-ray Telescope (20–250 keV), the medium energy X-ray telescope (5–30 keV), and the low energy X-ray telescope (1–15 keV)

== See also ==
- X-ray astronomy
- X-ray astronomy satellite
