= Electro-optical sensor =

Electronic sensors that convert light into electrical signals

Electro-optical sensors are electronic detectors that convert light, or a change in light, into an electronic signal. These sensors are able to detect electromagnetic radiation from the infrared down to the ultraviolet wavelengths. They are used in many industrial and consumer applications, for example:

- Lamps that turn on automatically in response to darkness
- Position sensors that activate when an object interrupts a light beam
- Flash detection, to synchronize one photographic flash to another
- Photoelectric sensors that detect the distance, absence, or presence of an object

== Function ==
An optical sensor converts light rays into electronic signals. It measures the physical quantity of light and then translates it into a form readable by an instrument. An optical sensor is generally part of a larger system that integrates a source of light, a measuring device, and the optical sensor. This is often connected to an electrical trigger. The trigger reacts to a change in the signal within the light sensor. An optical sensor can measure the changes from one or several light beams. When a change occurs, the light sensor operates as a photoelectric trigger and therefore either increases or decreases the electrical output. An optical switch enables signals in optical fibers or integrated optical circuits to be switched selectively between circuits. An optical switch can operate by mechanical means or by electro-optic effects, magneto-optic effects, and other methods.

== Types of optical sensors and switches ==
There are many different kinds of optical sensors, the most common types are:

- Photoconductive devices convert a change of incident light into a change of resistance.
- Photovoltaics, commonly known as solar cells, convert an amount of incident light into an output voltage.
- Photodiodes convert an amount of incident light into an output current.
- Phototransistors are a type of bipolar transistor where the base-collector junction is exposed to light. This results in the same behaviour of a photodiode, but with an internal gain.

Optical Switches are usually used in optical fibers, where the electro-optic effect is used to switch one circuit to another. These switches can be implemented with, for example, microelectromechanical systems or piezoelectric systems.

== Applications ==
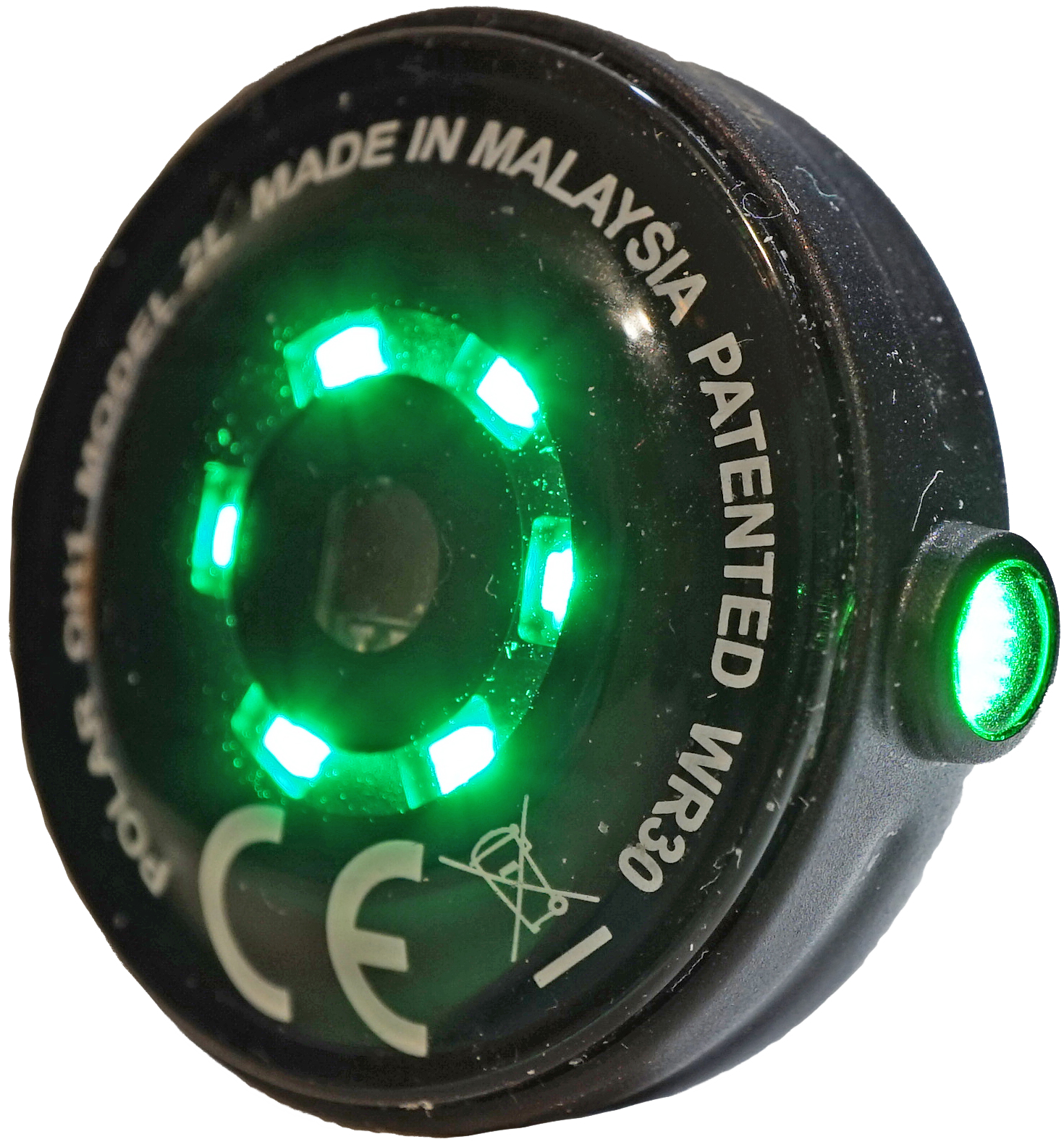
Optical heart-rate sensor

Electro-optical sensors are used whenever light needs to be converted to energy. Because of this, electro-optical sensors can be seen almost anywhere. Common applications are smartphones where sensors are used to adjust screen brightness, and smartwatches in which sensors are used to measure the wearer's heartbeat.

Optical sensors can be found in the energy field to monitor structures that generate, produce, distribute, and convert electrical power. The distributed and nonconductive nature of optical fibres makes optical sensors perfect for oil and gas applications, including pipeline monitoring. They can also be found in wind turbine blade monitoring, offshore platform monitoring, power line monitoring and downhole monitoring. Other applications include the civil and transportation fields such as bridge, airport landing strip, dam, railway, airplane, wing, fuel tank and ship hull monitoring.

Among other applications, optical switches can be found in thermal methods which vary the refraction index in one leg of an interferometer in order to switch the signal, MEMS approaches involving arrays of micromirrors that can deflect an optical signal to the appropriate receiver, piezoelectric beam steering liquid crystals which rotate polarized light depending on the applied electric field and acousto-optic methods which change the refraction index as a result of strain induced by an acoustic field to deflect light.

Another important application of optical sensor is to measure the concentration of different compounds by both visible and infrared spectroscopy.

== See also ==
- Imaging sensor
