= CBERS-2B =

Chinese-Brazilian remote sensing satellite

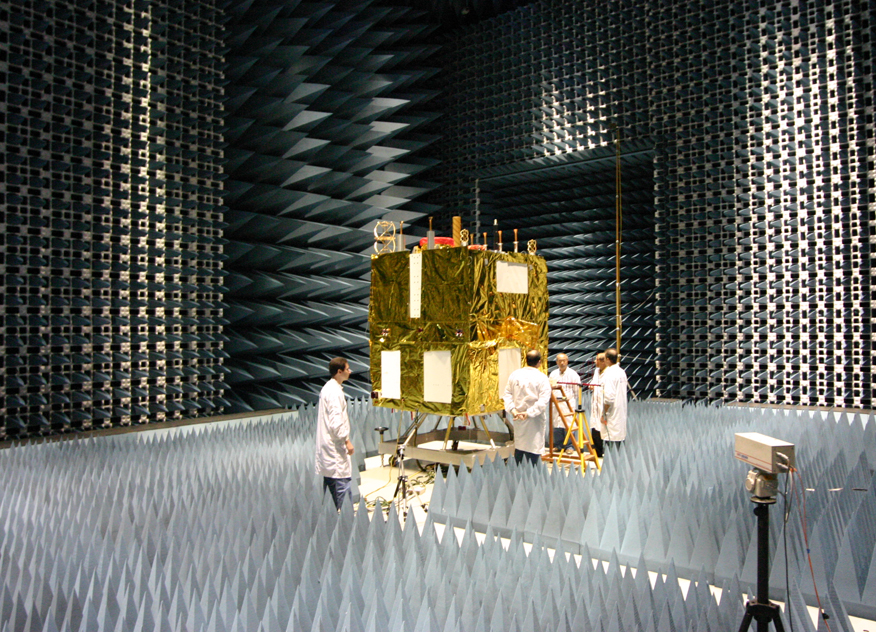
- Mission type: Remote sensing
- Operator: CNSA / INPE
- COSPAR ID: 2007-042A
- SATCAT no.: 32062
- Mission duration: 2 years (planned); 2 years, 7 months and 20 days (achieved)

Spacecraft properties
- Spacecraft type: CBERS
- Bus: Phoenix-Eye 1
- Manufacturer: CAST
- Launch mass: 1450 kg
- Dimensions: 1.8 x 2.0 x 2.2 m
- Power: 1100 watts

Start of mission
- Launch date: 19 September 2007, 03:26:13 UTC
- Rocket: Long March 4B
- Launch site: Taiyuan Satellite Launch Center, LC-7
- Contractor: SAST

End of mission
- Last contact: 10 May 2010

Orbital parameters
- Reference system: Geocentric orbit
- Regime: Sun-synchronous orbit
- Perigee altitude: 773 km
- Apogee altitude: 774 km
- Inclination: 98.60°
- Period: 100.30 minutes
- Epoch: 19 September 2007
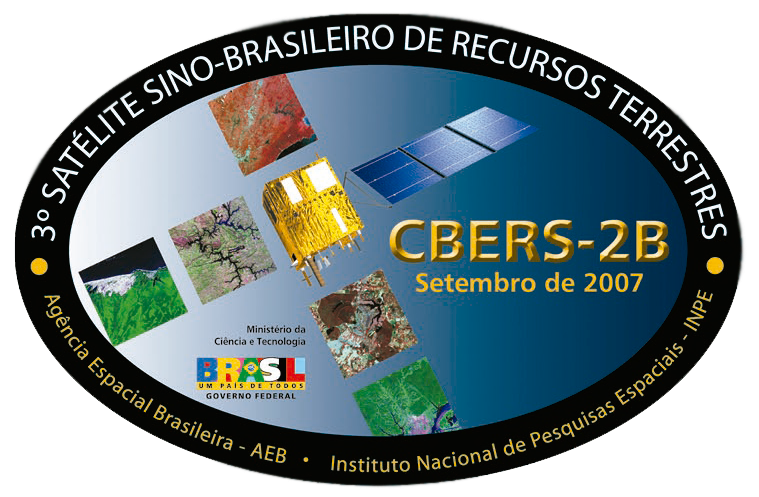

China–Brazil Earth Resources Satellite 2B (CBERS-2B), also known as Ziyuan 1-2B, was a remote sensing satellite operated as part of the China–Brazil Earth Resources Satellite program between the Chinese Center for Resources Satellite Data and Application and Brazilian National Institute for Space Research. The third CBERS satellite to fly, it was launched by China in 2007 to replace CBERS-2.

== Spacecraft ==
CBERS-2B was a 1,450-kilogram (3,200-pound) spacecraft built by the China Academy of Space Technology and based on the Phoenix-Eye 1 satellite bus. The spacecraft was powered by a single solar array, which provided 1100 watts of electricity for the satellite's systems. The 1.8 m x 2.0 m x 2.2 m, triaxially-stabilized spacecraft carries a low 20 m resolution, and a higher 2.5 m resolution camera. The data help in crop estimation, urban planning, water resource management, and military intelligence.

The instrument suite aboard the CBERS-2B spacecraft consisted of three systems:

- Wide Field Imager (WFI) produced visible-light to near-infrared images with a resolution of 260 meters (850 feet) and a swath width of 890 kilometers (550 miles).
- High-resolution CCD camera was used for multispectral imaging at a resolution of 20 m (66 ft) with a swath width of 113 km (70 mi).
- High Resolution Camera (HRC) was a panchromatic imager with a resolution of 2.5 m (8 ft 2 in) and a swath width of 27 km (17 mi).

The HRC replaced the lower-resolution Infrared Multispectral Scanner instrument flown on earlier CBERS satellites.

== Launch ==
A Long March 4B carrier rocket, operated by the China Academy of Launch Vehicle Technology (CALT), was used to launch CBERS-2B. The launch took place at 03:26:13 UTC on 19 September 2007, using Launch Complex 7 at the Taiyuan Satellite Launch Center (TLSC). The satellite was successfully placed into a Sun-synchronous orbit.

== Last contact ==
The CBERS-2B spacecraft suffered a power system failure on 10 May 2010, leaving it unable to continue operations. It remains in orbit.
