= Long March 4B =

Chinese orbital launch vehicle

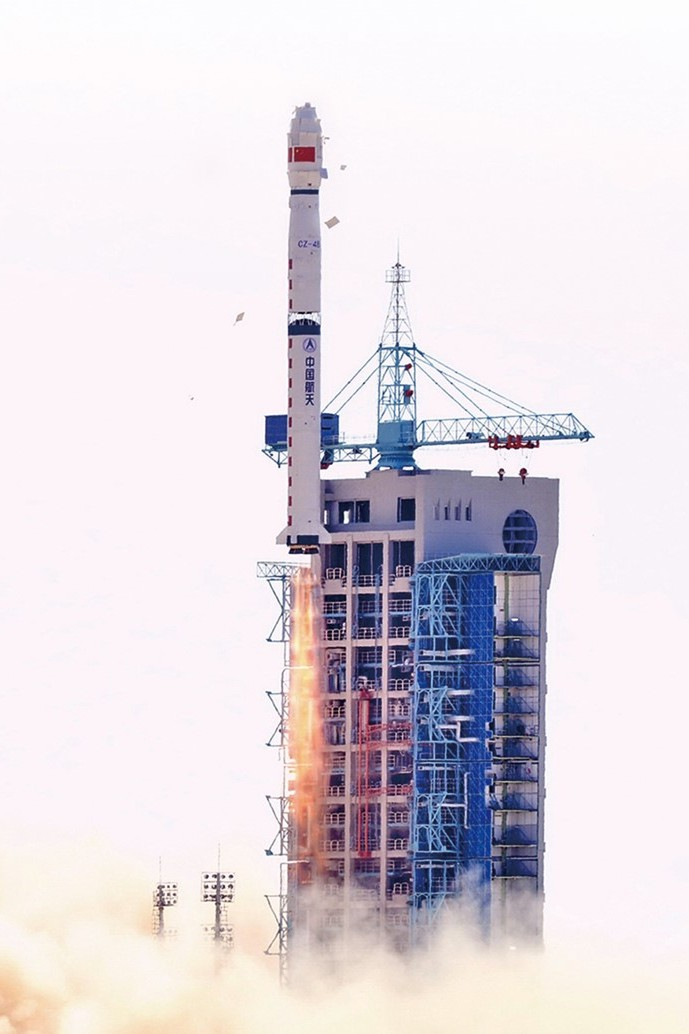
- Long March 4B launching HXMT
- Function: Medium-lift launch vehicle
- Manufacturer: Shanghai Academy of Spaceflight Technology
- Country of origin: China
- Cost per launch: US$50 million (2006)

Size
- Height: 44.1 m (145 ft)
- Diameter: 3.35 m (11.0 ft)
- Mass: 249,200 kg (549,400 lb)
- Stages: 3

Capacity

Payload to LEO
- Mass: 4,200 kg (9,300 lb)

Payload to SSO
- Mass: 2,800 kg (6,200 lb)

Payload to GTO
- Mass: 1,500 kg (3,300 lb)

Associated rockets
- Family: Long March
- Derivative work: Long March 4C

Launch history
- Status: Active
- Launch sites: Taiyuan, LA-7 and LA-9; Jiuquan, LA-4/SLS-2; Xichang, LA-3
- Total launches: 59
- Success(es): 58
- Failure: 1
- First flight: 10 May 1999
- Last flight: 23 October 2026 (most recent)

First stage
- Height: 27.91 m (91.6 ft)
- Diameter: 3.35 m (11.0 ft)
- Propellant mass: 182,000 kg (401,000 lb)
- Powered by: 4 YF-21C
- Maximum thrust: 2,961.6 kN (665,800 lb_{f})
- Specific impulse: 2,550 m/s (8,400 ft/s)
- Propellant: N_{2}O_{4} / UDMH

Second stage
- Height: 10.9 m (36 ft)
- Diameter: 3.35 m (11.0 ft)
- Propellant mass: 52,700 kg (116,200 lb)
- Powered by: 1 YF-24C (1 x YF-22C (Main)) (4 x YF-23C (Vernier))
- Maximum thrust: 742.04 kN (166,820 lb_{f}) (Main); 47.1 kN (10,600 lb_{f}) (Vernier)
- Specific impulse: 2,942 m/s (9,650 ft/s) (Main); 2,834 m/s (9,300 ft/s) (Vernier)
- Propellant: N_{2}O_{4} / UDMH

Third stage
- Height: 14.79 m (48.5 ft)
- Diameter: 2.9 m (9 ft 6 in)
- Propellant mass: 14,000 kg (31,000 lb)
- Powered by: 2 YF-40
- Maximum thrust: 100.85 kN (22,670 lb_{f})
- Specific impulse: 2,971 m/s (9,750 ft/s)
- Propellant: N_{2}O_{4} / UDMH

The Long March 4B (Chinese: 长征四号乙火箭), also known as the Chang Zheng 4B, CZ-4B, and LM-4B, is a Chinese expendable orbital launch vehicle. Launched from Launch Complex 1 at the Taiyuan Satellite Launch Center, it is a 3-stage launch vehicle, used mostly to place satellites into low Earth orbit and Sun-synchronous orbits. It was first launched on 10 May 1999, with the FY-1C weather satellite, which would later be the target in the 2007 Chinese anti-satellite missile test.

The Chang Zheng 4B experienced its only launch failure on 9 December 2013, with the loss of the CBERS-3 satellite.

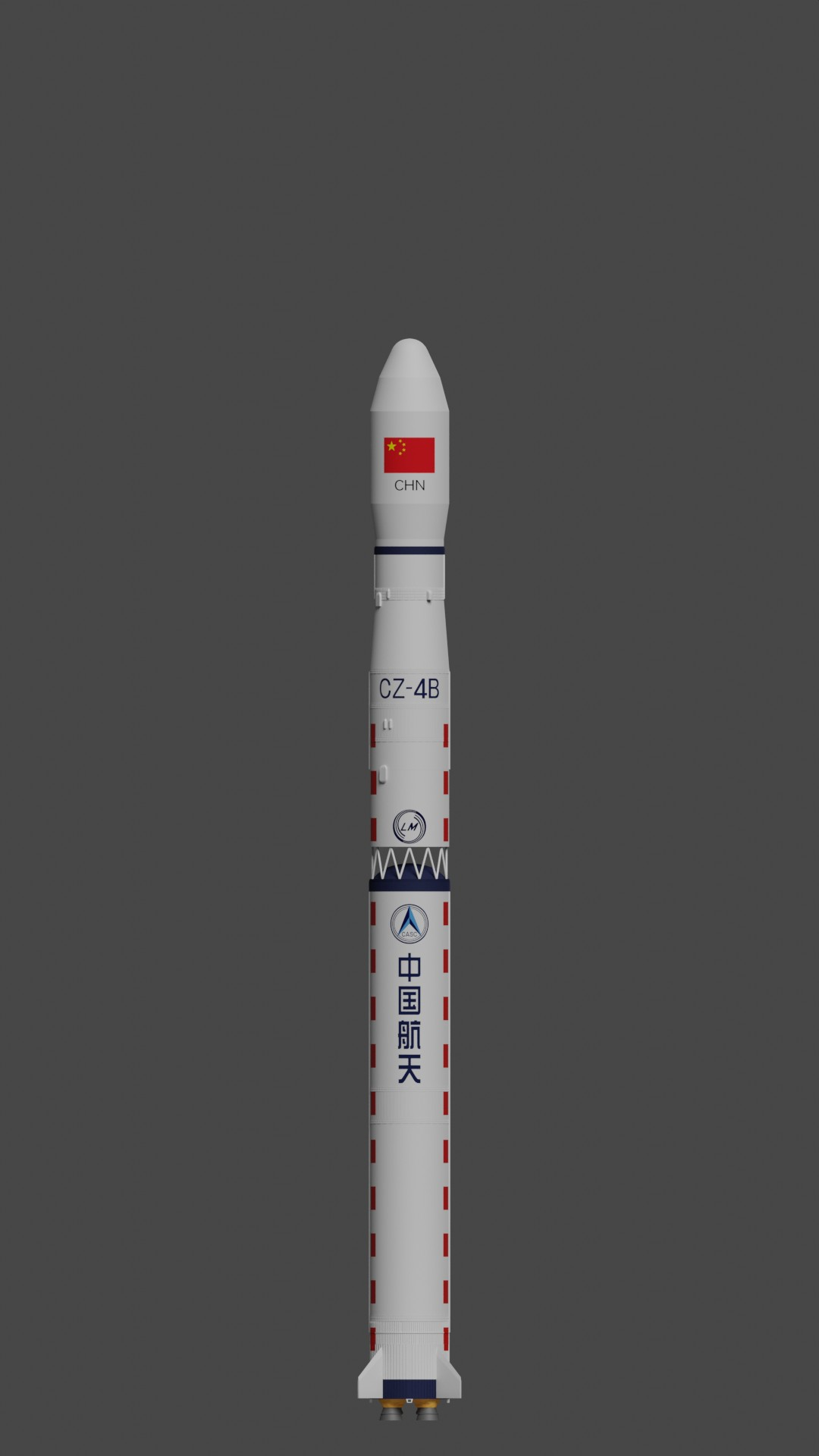
Rendering of Long March 4B

== Launch statistics ==
Number of launches, by year.

- Failure
- Partial failure
- Success
- Planned

== List of launches ==
Flight number	Serial number	Date and time (UTC)	Launch site	Payload	Orbit	Result
1	Y2	10 May 1999; 01:33	Taiyuan; LA-7	Fengyun 1C; Shijian 5	SSO	Success
2	Y1	14 October 1999; 03:15	Taiyuan; LA-7	CBERS-1; SACI-1	SSO	Success
3	Y3	1 September 2000; 03:25	Taiyuan; LA-7	Ziyuan II-01	SSO	Success
4	Y5	15 May 2002; 01:50	Taiyuan; LA-7	Fengyun 1D; HaiYang-1A	SSO	Success
5	Y6	27 October 2002; 03:17	Taiyuan; LA-7	Ziyuan II-02	SSO	Success
6	Y4	21 October 2003; 03:16	Taiyuan; LA-7	CBERS-2; Chuangxin 1-01	SSO	Success
7	Y7	8 September 2004; 23:14	Taiyuan; LA-7	Shijian 6-01A; Shijian 6-01B	SSO	Success
8	Y8	6 November 2004; 03:10	Taiyuan; LA-7	Ziyuan II-03	SSO	Success
9	Y16	23 October 2006; 23:34	Taiyuan; LA-7	Shijian 6-02A; Shijian 6-02B	SSO	Success
10	Y17	19 September 2007; 03:26	Taiyuan; LA-7	CBERS-2B	SSO	Success
11	Y22	25 October 2008; 01:15	Taiyuan; LA-9	Shijian 6-03A; Shijian 6-03B	SSO	Success
12	Y20	15 December 2008; 03:22	Taiyuan; LA-9	Yaogan 5	SSO	Success
13	Y23	6 October 2010; 00:49	Taiyuan; LA-9	Shijian 6-04A; Shijian 6-04B	SSO	Success
14	Y14	15 August 2011; 22:57	Taiyuan; LA-9	HaiYang-2A	SSO	Success
15	Y21	9 November 2011; 03:21	Taiyuan; LA-9	Yaogan 12; Tianxun 1	SSO	Success
16	Y15	22 December 2011; 03:26	Taiyuan; LA-9	Ziyuan I-02C	SSO	Success
17	Y26	9 January 2012; 03:17	Taiyuan; LA-9	Ziyuan 3-01; VesselSat-2	SSO	Success
18	Y12	10 May 2012; 07:06	Taiyuan; LA-9	Yaogan 14; Tiantuo 1	SSO	Success
19	Y25	25 October 2013; 03:50	Jiuquan; LA-4/SLS-2	Shijian 16-01	LEO	Success
20	Y10	9 December 2013; 03:26	Taiyuan; LA-9	CBERS-3	SSO	Failure
20	One of the two third-stage engines shut down prematurely, so that the satellite failed to reach orbit. The cause was traced to foreign debris that blocked the engine's fuel intake.					
21	Y27	19 August 2014; 03:15	Taiyuan; LA-9	Gaofen 2 BRITE-PL2 (Heweliusz)	SSO	Success
22	Y28	8 September 2014; 03:22	Taiyuan; LA-9	Yaogan 21; Tiantuo 2	SSO	Success
23	Y32	7 December 2014; 03:26	Taiyuan; LA-9	CBERS-4	SSO	Success
24	Y29	27 December 2014; 03:22	Taiyuan; LA-9	Yaogan 26	SSO	Success
25	Y30	26 June 2015; 06:22	Taiyuan; LA-9	Gaofen 8	SSO	Success
26	Y24	8 November 2015; 07:06	Taiyuan; LA-9	Yaogan 28	SSO	Success
27	Y33	30 May 2016; 03:17	Taiyuan; LA-9	Ziyuan 3-02; ÑuSat-1/-2	SSO	Success
28	Y35	29 June 2016; 03:21	Jiuquan; LA-4/SLS-2	Shijian 16-02	LEO	Success
29	Y31	15 June 2017; 03:00	Jiuquan; LA-4/SLS-2	HXMT; ÑuSat-3; Zhuhai-1	LEO	Success
30	Y37	31 July 2018; 03:00	Taiyuan; LA-9	Gaofen 11-01	SSO	Success
31	Y34	24 October 2018; 22:57	Taiyuan; LA-9	Haiyang-2B	SSO	Success
32	Y36	29 April 2019; 22:52	Taiyuan; LA-9	Tianhui-2-01 A/B	SSO	Success
33	Y39	12 September 2019; 03:26	Taiyuan; LA-9	Ziyuan I-02D	SSO	Success
34	Y38	3 November 2019; 03:22	Taiyuan; LA-9	Gaofen 7 Xiaoxiang 1-08	SSO	Success
35	Y44	20 December 2019; 03:22	Taiyuan; LA-9	CBERS-4A; ETRSS-1	SSO	Success
36	Y43	3 July 2020; 03:10	Taiyuan; LA-9	Gaofen Multi-Mode; BY-70-2	SSO	Success
37	Y45	25 July 2020; 03:13	Taiyuan; LA-9	Ziyuan 3-03; Tianqi 10; NJU-HKU 1	SSO	Success
38	Y46	7 September 2020; 05:57	Taiyuan; LA-9	Gaofen 11-02	SSO	Success
38	A booster presumably coming from this launch fell near populated areas.					
39	Y41	21 September 2020; 05:40	Jiuquan; LA-4/SLS-2	Haiyang-2C	LEO	Success
40	Y42	27 September 2020; 03:23	Taiyuan; LA-9	Huanjing-2A; Huanjing-2B	SSO	Success
41	Y49	8 April 2021; 23:01	Taiyuan; LA-9	Shiyan 6-03	SSO	Success
42	Y48	19 May 2021; 04:03	Jiuquan; LA-4/SLS-2	Haiyang-2D	LEO	Success
43	Y50	18 August 2021; 22:32	Taiyuan; LA-9	Tianhui-2 02A; Tianhui-2 02B	SSO	Success
44	Y52	20 November 2021; 01:51	Taiyuan; LA-9	Gaofen 11-03	SSO	Success
45	Y47	10 December 2021; 00:11	Jiuquan; LA-4/SLS-2	Shijian-6 05A; Shijian-6 05B	SSO	Success
46	Y40	4 August 2022; 03:08	Taiyuan; LA-9	TECIS; Minxing Shaonian; Jiaotong-4	SSO	Success
47	Y55	27 December 2022; 07:37	Taiyuan; LA-9	Gaofen 11-04	SSO	Success
48	Y51	16 April 2023; 01:36	Jiuquan; LA-4/SLS-2	Fengyun 3G	LEO	Success
49	Y58	19 July 2024; 03:03	Taiyuan; LA-9	Gaofen 11-05	SSO	Success
50	Y72	16 August 2024; 07:35	Xichang; LA-3	Yaogan 43-01A/B/C/D/E/F/G/H/I	LEO	Success
51	Y73	3 September 2024; 01:22	Xichang; LA-3	Yaogan 43-02A/B/C/D/E/F	LEO	Success
52	Y53	13 November 2024; 22:42	Taiyuan; LA-9	Haiyang 4A	SSO	Success
53	Y62	29 May 2025; 04:12	Jiuquan; SLS-2	Shijian-26	SSO	Success
54	Y64	9 December 2025; 03:41	Jiuquan; SLS-2	Yaogan 47	SSO	Success
55	Y61	16 December 2025; 03:17	Taiyuan; LA-9	Ziyuan 3-04	SSO	Success
56	Y69	30 December 2025; 04:12	Jiuquan; SLS-2	Tianhui 7	SSO	Success
57	Y?	1 July 2026; 23:46	Jiuquan; LA-4/SLS-2	Haiyang-2E	SSO	Success
58	Y?	10 September 2026; 09:00	Jiuquan; SLS-2	Yaogan 53-01 to 03; Yaogan 56-01 to 03	LEO	Success
59	Y81	23 October 2026; 19:25	Jiuquan; SLS-2	Yaogan 53-07 to 09; Yaogan 56-19 to 21	LEO	Success
Source: Gunter's Space Page

== See also ==
- Long March 4C, Very similar to 4B, but modified 3rd stage engine and payload fairing
- Long March (rocket family)
- Medium-lift launch vehicle
