= VNIR =

Portion of the electromagnetic spectrum between 400–1100 nm

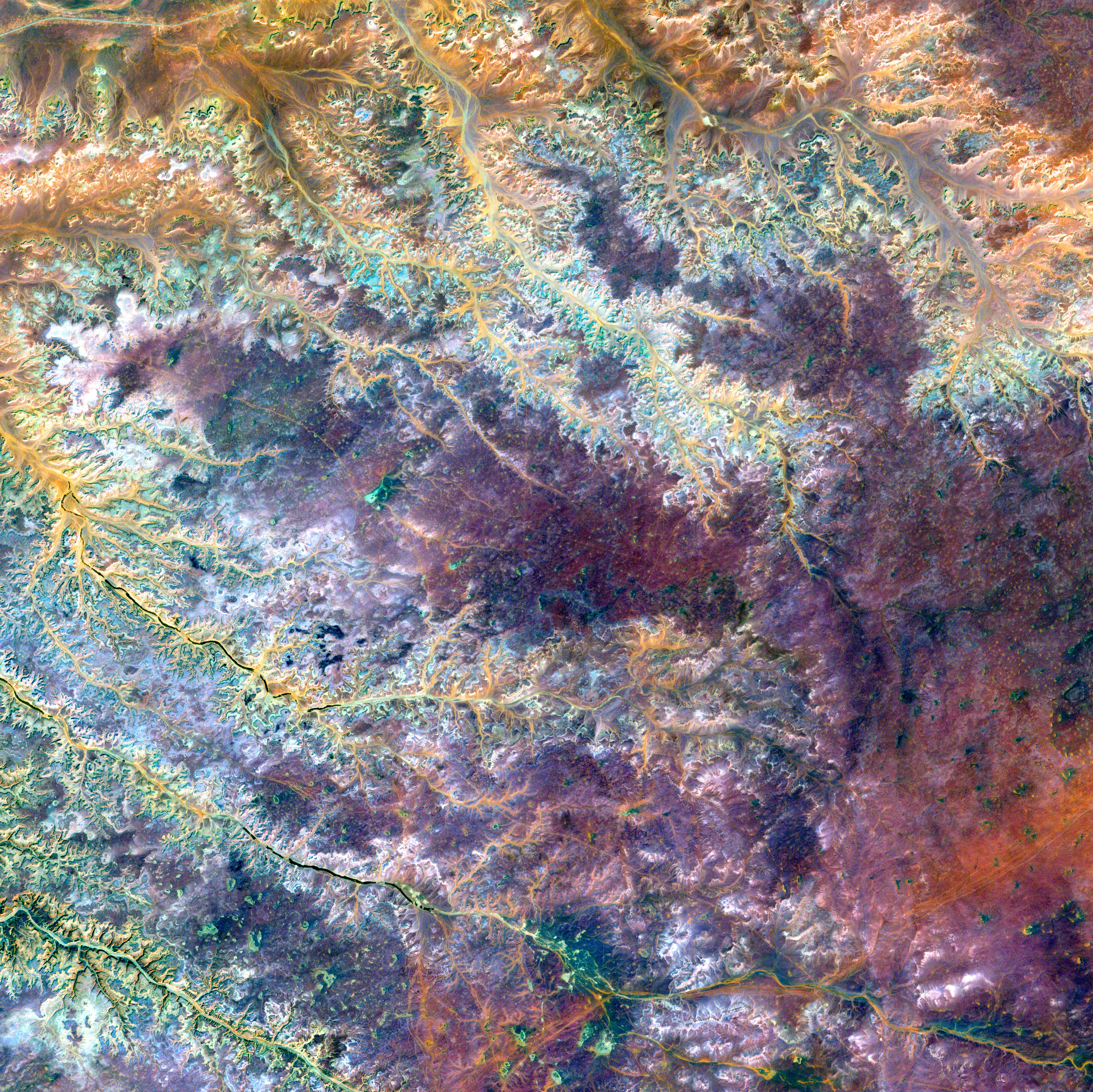
A VNIR image of the Ghadamis River in Libya. This is a false-color composite image made using near-infrared, green, and blue wavelengths.

The visible and near-infrared (VNIR) portion of the electromagnetic spectrum has wavelengths between approximately 400 and 1100 nanometers (nm). It combines the full visible spectrum with an adjacent portion of the infrared spectrum up to the water absorption band between 1400 and 1500 nm. Some definitions also include the short-wavelength infrared band from 1400 nm up to the water absorption band at 2500 nm. VNIR multi-spectral image cameras have wide applications in remote sensing and imaging spectroscopy. Hyperspectral Imaging Satellite carried two payloads, of which one was working on the spectral range of VNIR.

== See also ==
- Advanced Spaceborne Thermal Emission and Reflection Radiometer
- Airborne Real-time Cueing Hyperspectral Enhanced Reconnaissance
- Mars Reconnaissance Orbiter
- Near infrared spectroscopy
