= CBERS-1 =

First satellite cooperation program between China and Brazil

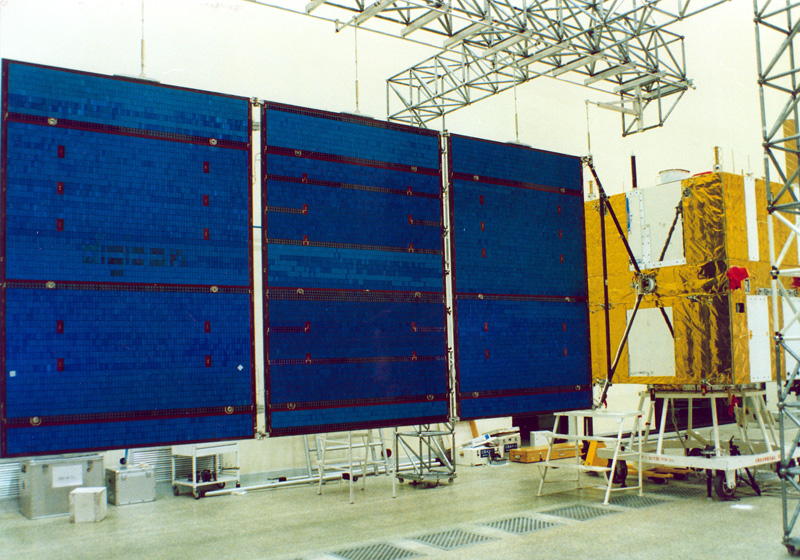
- View of CBERS-1
- Mission type: Remote sensing
- Operator: CNSA / INPE
- COSPAR ID: 1999-057A
- SATCAT no.: 25940
- Website: CBERS
- Mission duration: 2 years

Spacecraft properties
- Spacecraft type: CBERS
- Bus: Phoenix-Eye 1
- Launch mass: 1,450 kg (3,200 lb)
- Power: 1,100 watts

Start of mission
- Launch date: 14 October 1999, 03:15 UTC
- Rocket: Chang Zheng 4B
- Launch site: Taiyuan LC-7

End of mission
- Disposal: Decommissioned
- Deactivated: September 2003

Orbital parameters
- Reference system: Geocentric
- Regime: Sun-synchronous
- Semi-major axis: 7,153.45 km (4,444.95 mi)
- Eccentricity: 0.0004025
- Perigee altitude: 779 km (484 mi)
- Apogee altitude: 785 km (488 mi)
- Inclination: 98.34 degrees
- Period: 100.35 minutes
- Epoch: 30 November 2013, 20:57:46 UTC
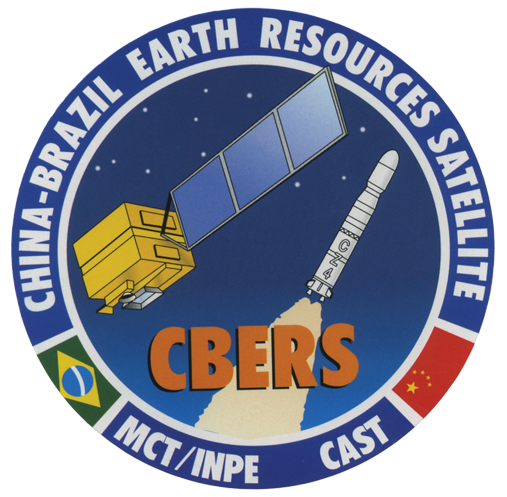

China–Brazil Earth Resources Satellite 1 (CBERS-1), also known as Ziyuan I-01 or Ziyuan 1A (ZY 1, ZY 1A), is a remote sensing satellite which was operated as part of the China–Brazil Earth Resources Satellite program between the China National Space Administration and Brazil's National Institute for Space Research. The first CBERS satellite to fly, it was launched by China in 1999.

CBERS-1 was a 1,450 kg (3,200 lb) spacecraft built by the China Academy of Space Technology and based on the Phoenix-Eye 1 satellite bus. The spacecraft was powered by a single solar array, providing 1,100 watts of electricity for the satellite's systems. The instrument suite aboard the CBERS-1 spacecraft consisted of three systems: the Wide Field Imager (WFI) produced visible-light to near-infrared images with a resolution of 260 metres (850 ft) and a swath width of 890 km (550 mi); a high-resolution CCD camera was used for multispectral imaging at a resolution of 20 metres (66 ft) with a swath width of 113 km (70 mi); the third instrument, the Infrared Multispectral Scanner (IMS), had a resolution of 80 metres (260 ft) and a swath width of 120 kilometres (75 mi).

A Chang Zheng 4B carrier rocket, operated by the China Academy of Launch Vehicle Technology, was used to launch CBERS-1. The launch took place at 03:15 UTC on 14 October 1999, using Launch Complex 7 at the Taiyuan Satellite Launch Centre. The satellite was successfully placed into a Sun-synchronous orbit.

CBERS-1 was decommissioned in September 2003, almost four years after launch. The derelict satellite remains in orbit; as of 30 November 2013 it is in an orbit with a perigee of 779 km (484 mi), an apogee of 785 km (488 mi), 98.34 degrees inclination and a period of 100.35 minutes. The orbit has a semimajor axis of 7,153.45 km (4,444.95 mi), and eccentricity of 0.0004025.
