= Taiyuan Satellite Launch Center =

Launch site in Shanxi, China

- Long March 6 on Launch Pad 16
- Interactive map of Taiyuan Satellite Launch Center
- Location: Kelan, Xinzhou, Shanxi
- Coordinates: 38°50′56.71″N 111°36′30.59″E
- Short name: TSLC
- Operator: CASC
- Total launches: 160 (Note: In addition to the flights that took place in the mentioned launch pads, two Kuaizhou-1A launches that took place in an unidentified location within the launch complex are included in the count.)
- Launch pad(s): Five (four active, one retired)

Launch history
- Status: Active
LA-7 launch history
- Status: Retired
- Launches: 26
- First launch: 6 September 1988; Long March 4A / Fengyun 1A
- Last launch: 21 April 2009; Long March 2C / Yaogan 6
- Associated rockets: Long March 4A; Long March 2C; Long March 4B; Long March 4C
LA-9 launch history
- Status: Active
- Launches: 86
- First launch: 24 October 2008; Long March 4B / Shijian-6E & 6F
- Last launch: 18 November 2026; Long March 2D / Shijian-24
- Associated rockets: Long March 4B; Long March 4C; Long March 2C; Long March 2D
LA-16 launch history
- Status: Active
- Launches: 16
- First launch: 19 September 2015; Long March 6 / XY 2
- Last launch: 25 April 2026; Long March 6 / PRSC-EO3
- Associated rockets: Long March 6 Kuaizhou-1A
LA-9A launch history
- Status: Active
- Launches: 30
- First launch: 29 March 2022; Long March 6A / Pujiang-2 & Tiankun-2
- Last launch: 23 October 2026; Long March 6A / Yaogan 50-03
- Associated rockets: Long March 6A; Long March 6C
Mobile launcher pad launch history
- Status: Active
- Launches: 2
- First launch: 7 December 2019; Kuaizhou 1A / Jilin-1 Gaofen-02B
- Last launch: 25 September 2022; Kuaizhou 1A / Shiyan-14; Shiyan-15
- Associated rockets: Kuaizhou 1A

The Taiyuan Satellite Launch Center (TSLC), also known as Base 25 (Chinese: 二十五基地), is a Chinese space and defense launch facility (spaceport) situated in Kelan County, Xinzhou, Shanxi Province. It is the second of four launch sites, having been founded in March 1966 and coming into full operation in 1968.

== History ==
The facility was built as part of China's Third Front campaign to develop basic industry and national security in China's rugged interior in case of invasion by the Soviet Union or the United States.

Taiyuan sits at an altitude of 1,500 meters, and its dry climate makes it an ideal launch site. The site is primarily used to launch meteorological satellites, Earth resource satellites, and scientific satellites on Long March launch vehicles into Sun-synchronous orbits. TSLC is also a major launch site for intercontinental ballistic missiles and overland submarine-launched ballistic missile tests.

The site has a sophisticated technical center and mission command and control center. It is served by two feeder railways that connect with the Ningwu–Kelan railway.

== Launch pads ==
- Launch Site 7: CZ-1D, CZ-2C/SD, CZ-4A, CZ-4B and CZ-4C vehicles. Entered operations in 1979 and was remodeled in 2008. Located at 38.848737°N 111.607970°E.
- Launch Site 9: CZ-2C, CZ-2D, CZ-4B and CZ-4C. First use on 25 October 2008. Located at 38.863200°N 111.589639°E.
- Launch Site 16: CZ-6 and Kuaizhou-1A. The CZ-6 Launch Pad was completed in 2014. Located at 38.868223°N 111.580264°E.
- Launch Site 9A: CZ-6A and CZ-6C Vehicle. Located at 38.858654°N 111.584808°E.
- Mobile Launcher Pad: Kuaizhou-1A.

== Launches ==
=== Previous launches ===
Date	Vehicle	Serial number	Launch Pad	Payload	Outcome	Notes
6 September 1988 20:30 UTC	Long March 4A	4A-Y1	LA-7	Fengyun 1A	Success	
9 September 1990 00:53 UTC	Long March 4A	4A-Y2	LA-7	Fengyun 1B; QQW-1,2	Success	
1 September 1997 14:00 UTC	Long March 2C/SD	2CFP-Y1	LA-7	Iridium mass simulator A Iridium mass simulator B	Success	
8 December 1997	Long March 2C/SD		LA-7	Iridium 42; Iridium 44	Success	
25 March 1998	Long March 2C/SD		LA-7	Iridium 51; Iridium 61	Success	
2 May 1998	Long March 2C/SD		LA-7	Iridium 69; Iridium 71	Success	
20 August 1998	Long March 2C/SD		LA-7	Iridium 76; Iridium 78	Success	
19 December 1998	Long March 2C/SD		LA-7	Iridium 88; Iridium 89	Success	
10 May 1999	Long March 4B		LA-7	Fengyun 1C; Shijian 5	Success	
11 June 1999	Long March 2C/SD		LA-7	Iridium 92; Iridium 93	Success	
14 October 1999	Long March 4B		LA-7	CBERS-1; SACI 1	Success	
1 September 2000	Long March 4B		LA-7	Ziyuan-2 01	Success	
15 May 2002	Long March 4B		LA-7	Fengyun 1D; HaiYang 1A	Success	
15 September 2002	Kaituozhe 1		KLP	PS-1	Failed	
27 October 2002	Long March 4B		LA-7	Ziyuan-2 02	Success	
16 September 2003	Kaituozhe 1		KLP	PS-2	Failed	
21 October 2003	Long March 4B		LA-7	CBERS-2; Chuangxin-1 01	Success	
25 July 2004	Long March 2C/SM		LA-7	Double Star P	Success	
9 September 2004	Long March 4B		LA-7	Shijian 6A; Shijian 6B	Success	
6 November 2004	Long March 4B		LA-7	Ziyuan-2 03	Success	
9 June 2005	Kaituozhe 1		KLP	PS-2	Failed	
27 April 2006	Long March 4C		LA-7	Yaogan 1	Success	
6 November 2020 03:19 UTC	Long March 6	Y3	LA-16	ÑuSat 9-18 (10 Sats)	Success	
29 March 2022 09:50 UTC	Long March 6A	6A-Y1	LA-9A	Pujiang-2; Tiankun-2	Success	First flight at the "smart" launch pad, and the maiden flight of Long March 6A.
11 November 2022 22:52 UTC	Long March 6A	6A-Y2	LA-9A	Yunhai-3-01	Success	
20 June 2023 03:18 UTC	Long March 6	Y12	LA-16	Shiyan 25	Success	
8 August 2023 UTC	Long March 2C	2C-Y46	LA-9	S-SAR 02 (Huanjing 2F)	Success	
10 September 2023 04:30 UTC	Long March 6A	6A-Y5	LA-9A	Yaogan 40A; Yaogan 40B; Yaogan 40C	Success	
26 March 2024 22:51 UTC	Long March 6A	6A-Y3	LA-9A	Yunhai-3-02	Success	
7 May 2024 UTC	Long March 6C	6C-Y2	LA-9A	Haiwangxing 01; Zhixing-1C; KuanfuGuangxue; Gaofen Shipin	Success	
13 January 2026 14:16 UTC	Long March 6A	6A-Y4	LA-9A	Tianhui-5A; Tianhui-5B	Success	
25 August 2026 03:21 UTC	Long March 6C	6C-Y1	LA-9A	BaYi-04; JingAn MengXiang-01; Zhongke-14; Zhongke-15; Lingzhi-09; Two other satellites	Success	

Taiyuan Satellite Launch Center was to launch a satellite coded as the 03 Group of the Shijian-6 serial research satellites sometime on 24 October 2008. The rocket carrier was to be a Long March 4B, noting both the satellite and the rocket were in good condition and all the preparations for the launch had been completed.

== The DongFang Spaceport ==
The DongFang Spaceport (东方航天港) is a maritime launch center under the jurisdiction of Taiyuan Satellite Launch Center. Its home port is in Haiyang, Yantai. It uses sea-launch platforms to perform launch missions in the exclusive economic zone outside China's territorial waters or in coastal waters. It can accept launch missions from private commercial rockets.

The first launch mission was serial number HY1 mission of Long March 11 on 04:06, 5 June 2019, which was successful in the Yellow Sea. The recent launch was the first launch of Gravity-1 on 13:30, 11 January 2024, which was successful in the Yellow Sea.

== See also ==
- Space program of China
- Jiuquan Satellite Launch Center
- Xichang Satellite Launch Center
- Wenchang Satellite Launch Center
