= China Academy of Space Technology =

Chinese research institute

- 中国空间技术研究院

Agency overview
- Abbreviation: CAST
- Formed: 20 February 1968; 58 years ago
- Type: Space agency
- Headquarters: Haidian District, Beijing, China
- Official language: Mandarin Chinese
- Owner: China Aerospace Science and Technology Corporation
- Employees: 10,000+
- Website: cast.cn

The China Academy of Space Technology (CAST; 中国空间技术研究院) is a research institute affiliated with the China Aerospace Science and Technology Corporation (CASC), located in Haidian, Beijing, China. The institute was founded on 20 February 1968, and is a major spacecraft development and production facility in China. On 24 April 1970, CAST successfully launched China's first artificial satellite Dong Fang Hong I.

== Space flight programmes ==
CAST designs and manufactures the Dong Fang Hong satellites.

== U.S. sanctions ==
CAST is the majority shareholder of listed company China Spacesat. On 30 June 2020, CAST owns 51.46% of China Spacesat Co. In August 2020, the United States Department of Defense published the names of companies linked to the People's Liberation Army operating directly or indirectly in the United States. China Spacesat Co. was included on the list. In November 2020, Donald Trump issued an executive order prohibiting any American company or individual from owning shares in companies that the United States Department of Defense has listed as having links to the People's Liberation Army, which included China Spacesat.

In August 2022, CAST's 502 and 513 Research Institutes were added to the United States Department of Commerce's Entity List.
