= Carlos Cesnik =

Brazilian-American aerospace engineer

Carlos E. S. Cesnik
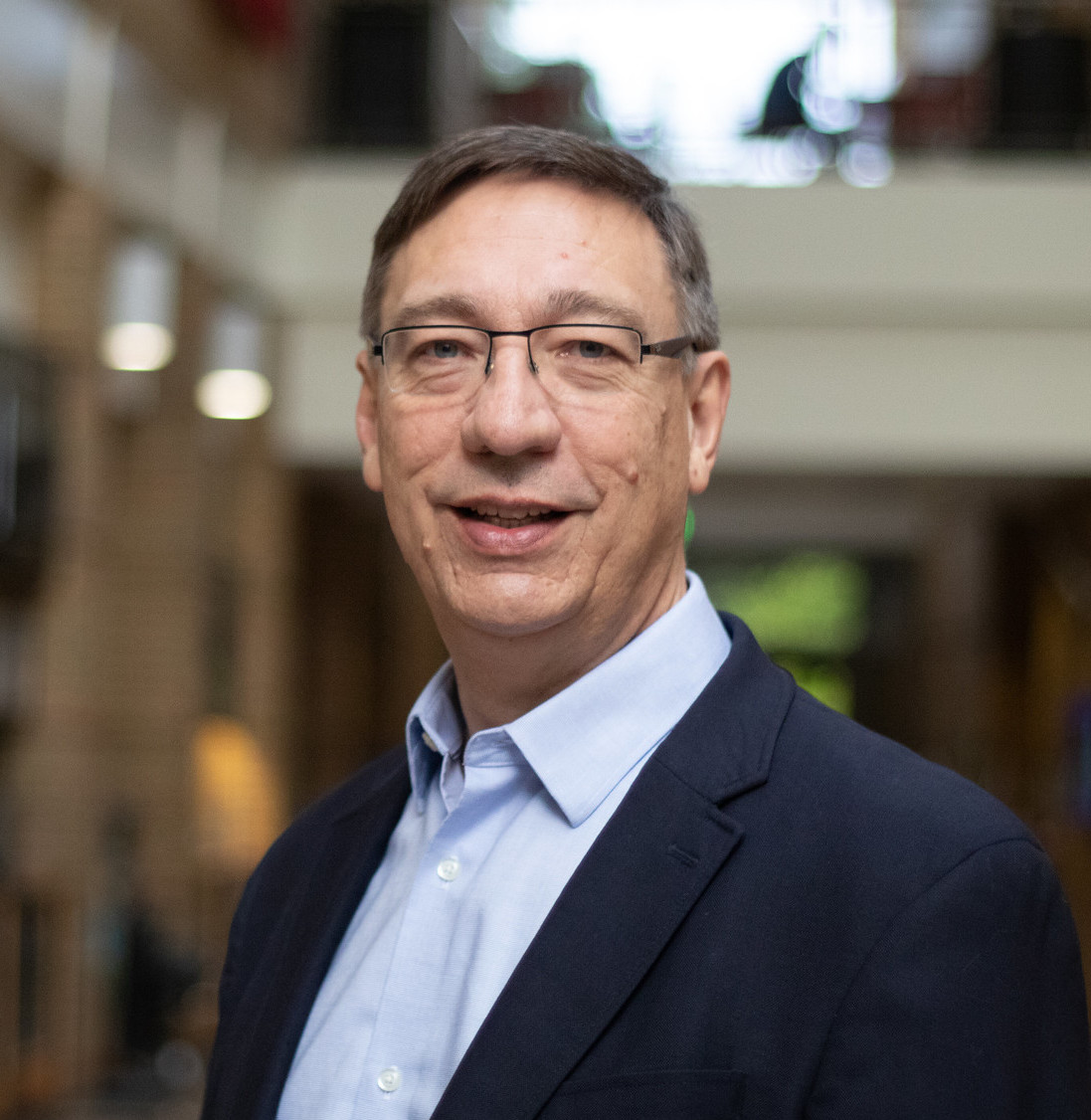
- Occupations: Aerospace engineer, academic, and author
- Title: Chair and Professor
- Awards: Fellow, American Institute of Aeronautics and Astronautics (AIAA); Fellow, Royal Aeronautical Society (RAeS); Fellow, Vertical Flight Society (VFS); Scientific Achievement Award, NATO Science and Technology Organization; AIAA Sustained Service Award

Academic background
- Education: B.S., Aeronautical Engineering; M.S., Aeronautical Engineering; M.S., Aerospace Engineering; Ph.D., Aerospace Engineering
- Alma mater: Instituto Tecnológico de Aeronáutica; Georgia Institute of Technology

Carlos E. S. Cesnik is a Brazilian-American aerospace engineer, academic, and author. He is the Richard A. Auhll Department Chair of Aerospace Engineering and the François-Xavier Bagnoud Endowed Professor of Aerospace Engineering at the University of Michigan. He was previously the Clarence L. (Kelly) Johnson Collegiate Professor of Aerospace Engineering. He is the founding director of the Active Aeroelasticity and Structures Research Laboratory at the University of Michigan. He was the director for the Airbus-Michigan Center for Aero-Servo-Elasticity of Very Flexible Aircraft (CASE-VFA) until 2022.

Cesnik has authored over 350 publications on computational and experimental aeroelasticity of very flexible aircraft, vibration and noise reductions of helicopter rotor systems, and nonlinear active aeroelastic modeling. He is the co-author of a book entitled Dynamics of Flexible Aircraft: Coupled Flight Dynamics, Aeroelasticity and Control.

Cesnik is a Fellow of American Institute of Aeronautics and Astronautics (AIAA), Royal Aeronautical Society (RAeS), and Vertical Flight Society (VFS). He has served as AIAA’s director for the Aerospace Design and Structures Group and as a member of AIAA’s Council of Directors until 2020.

== Education ==
Cesnik was born and initially educated in Brazil. He enrolled at the Instituto Tecnológico de Aeronáutica and received his bachelor’s and master's degrees in aeronautical engineering in 1987 and 1989, respectively. Following this, he moved to the United States, earning a master's degree in aerospace engineering in 1991 and his doctoral degree in aerospace engineering from Georgia Institute of Technology in 1994.

From 1994 to 1996, Cesnik was a postdoctoral fellow in the School of Aerospace Engineering at Georgia Institute of Technology.

== Career ==
Following his postdoctoral fellowship, Cesnik held an appointment as the Boeing Assistant Professor of Aeronautics and Astronautics at the Massachusetts Institute of Technology (MIT) and was later promoted to associate professor. In 2001, he joined the University of Michigan as an associate professor of aerospace engineering and was promoted to full professor in 2008. He is the founding director of U-M’s Active Aeroelasticity and Structures Research Laboratory (A^{2}SRL). Since 2019, he holds the Clarence L. (Kelly) Johnson Collegiate Professor of aerospace engineering. In 2014, he also held the Benjamin Meaker Visiting Professor of aerospace engineering at the University of Bristol. At the Instituto Tecnológico de Aeronáutica (ITA), Brazil, he was the inaugural holder of the EMBRAER–Guido Pessotti Chair Professorship of Engineering from 2015 until 2017.

During his tenure at the University of Michigan, Cesnik also held administrative positions. He was appointed as program advisor for aerospace engineering from 2003 to 2005 and chair of the Aerospace Graduate Program from 2008 to 2012. In 2017, he became the director of the Airbus-Michigan Center for Aero-Servo-Elasticity of Very Flexible Aircraft (CASE-VFA). He is currently the chair of the Aerospace Department at the University of Michigan.

In 2015 he worked as a visiting research fellow at Boeing Research and Technology (BR&T), Huntington Beach, California.

== Research ==
Cesnik is most known for his research on the multi-fidelity, multi-physics modeling, design, simulation, and experimentation of various aircraft concepts, spanning fundamental and applied research. He has also focused his research on the aero-servo-elastic behavior of very flexible aircraft. Among his experimental work, the X-HALE unmanned flying testbed is the most known. The University of Michigan’s Nonlinear Aeroelastic Simulation Toolbox (UM/NAST) is a reference software for the modeling, analysis, and simulation of (very) flexible aircraft, combining aeroelasticity with flight dynamics and controls.

Cesnik has also been working on the problem of aero-thermo-elastic modeling and simulation of hypersonic vehicles. Another successful product resulting from his group’s research is the University of Michigan’s High-Speed Vehicle (UM/HSV) framework, a software for comprehensive analysis and simulation of coupled aero-thermo-elastic-propulsive free-flight simulation of hypersonic vehicles.

Cesnik is the author of the original software VABS (Variational Asymptotic Beam Section) for modeling composite rotor blades. The original version was when he was a PhD student under Dewey Hodges at Georgia Tech. The software can provide an accurate beam representation of the blade cross-sectional structure while allowing a designer to take advantage of composite materials when designing rotor blades. While focusing on Timoshenko-like modeling of initially curved and twisted composite beams, he and his co-authors addressed the trends of the various classical (extension-twist, bending-twist, and extension-bending) and nonclassical couplings that can be used in such advanced designs. The formulation was later extended to piezoelectric materials and arbitrary cross-sectional deformation modes in the UM/VABS releases. He and his students used the code to design the Army/NASA/MIT Active Twist Rotor (ATR) that was tested at NASA Langley’s Transonic Dynamics Tunnel (TDT). It was the first successful closed-loop vibration reduction of an integrally actuated rotor system. Several studies on vibration reduction and the design of ATR systems marked the first 15 years of Cesnik’s academic career.

Cesnik also has contributions made to the field of guided-wave structural health monitoring (SHM). In 2007, he assessed its state of the art and proposed several developments for further advancement of this field. In his survey of candidate methods for the in-situ detection of damage in composite materials, he discussed the applicability of frequency response method in this regard and also highlighted its constraints in terms of providing potentially important information about the damage.

== Awards and honors ==
- 2002 — Georgia Tech Council of Outstanding Young Engineering Alumni Award
- 2007, 2008, 2009 & 2010 — Industrial Associates Program Award, Northrop Grumman Co.
- 2010, 2013 — Aerospace Department Award for Outstanding Accomplishment
- 2011 — Scientific Achievement Award, NATO Research and Technology Organization
- 2018 — Monroe-Brown Foundation Research Excellence Award, College of Engineering
- 2002, 2010 & 2019 - ASME/Boeing Structures and Materials Award
- 2012 — Fellow, American Institute of Aeronautics and Astronautics (AIAA)
- 2014 — Fellow, Royal Aeronautical Society (RAeS)
- 2020 — Fellow, Vertical Flight Society (VFS)
- 2021 — AIAA Sustained Service Award

== Bibliography ==
=== Selected articles ===
- Cesnik, C. E. S., & Hodges, D. H. (1997). VABS: a new concept for composite rotor blade cross-sectional modeling. Journal of the American helicopter society, 42(1), 27-38.
- Kessler, S. S., Spearing, S. M., Atalla, M. J., Cesnik, C. E. S., & Soutis, C. (2002). Damage detection in composite materials using frequency response methods. Composites Part B: Engineering, 33(1), 87-95.
- Yu, W., Hodges, D. H., Volovoi, V., & Cesnik, C. E. S. (2002). On Timoshenko-like modeling of initially curved and twisted composite beams. International Journal of Solids and Structures, 39(19), 5101-5121.
- Raghavan, A. & Cesnik, C. E. S., (2007). A Review of Guided-Wave Structural Health Monitoring. The Shock and Vibration Digest, 39(2), 91-114.
- Shyy, W., Aono, H., Chimakurthi, S. K., Trizila, P., Kang, C. K., Cesnik, C. E. S., & Liu, H. (2010). Recent progress in flapping wing aerodynamics and aeroelasticity. Progress in Aerospace Sciences, 46(7), 284-327.
