= Amazônia-1 =

Brazilian earth observation satellite

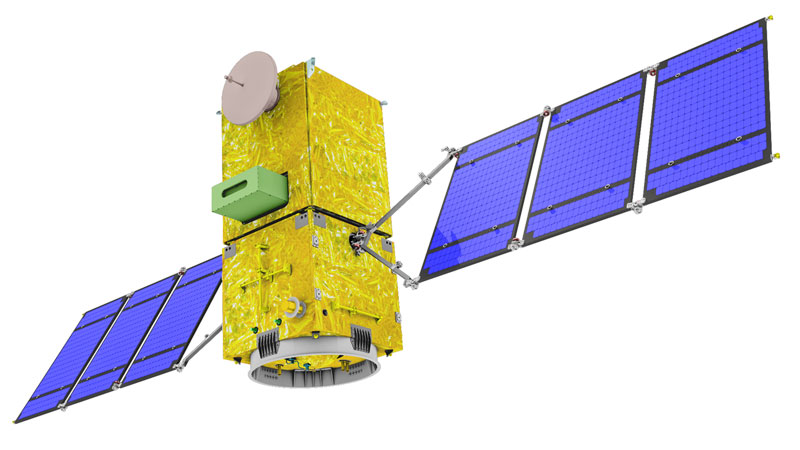
- Amazônia-1 coupled with Payload Module.
- Names: SSR-1; Satélite de Sensoriamento Remoto-1
- Mission type: Earth observation
- Operator: INPE
- COSPAR ID: 2021-015A
- SATCAT no.: 47699
- Website: Amazon Mission
- Mission duration: 5 years, 8 months and 12 days (elapsed); 4 years (planned)

Spacecraft properties
- Bus: MMP
- Manufacturer: INPE
- Launch mass: 637 kg (1,404 lb)

Start of mission
- Launch date: 28 February 2021, 04:54 UTC
- Rocket: PSLV-C51
- Launch site: First Launch Pad, Satish Dhawan Space Centre
- Contractor: NewSpace India Limited

Orbital parameters
- Reference system: Geocentric orbit
- Regime: Sun-synchronous orbit
- Semi-major axis: 7,127 km (4,429 mi)
- Eccentricity: 0.011083
- Perigee altitude: 748.6 km (465.2 mi)
- Apogee altitude: 764.4 km (475.0 mi)
- Inclination: 98.5089°
- Period: 99.8 minutes
- RAAN: 135.0747°
- Argument of perigee: 261.1190°
- Mean anomaly: 98.8578°
- Epoch: 28 February 2021

Main camera
- Name: Advanced Wide Field Imager (AWFI)
- Collecting area: 850 km (530 mi)
- Wavelengths: VIS-NIR band
- Resolution: 60 m (200 ft)
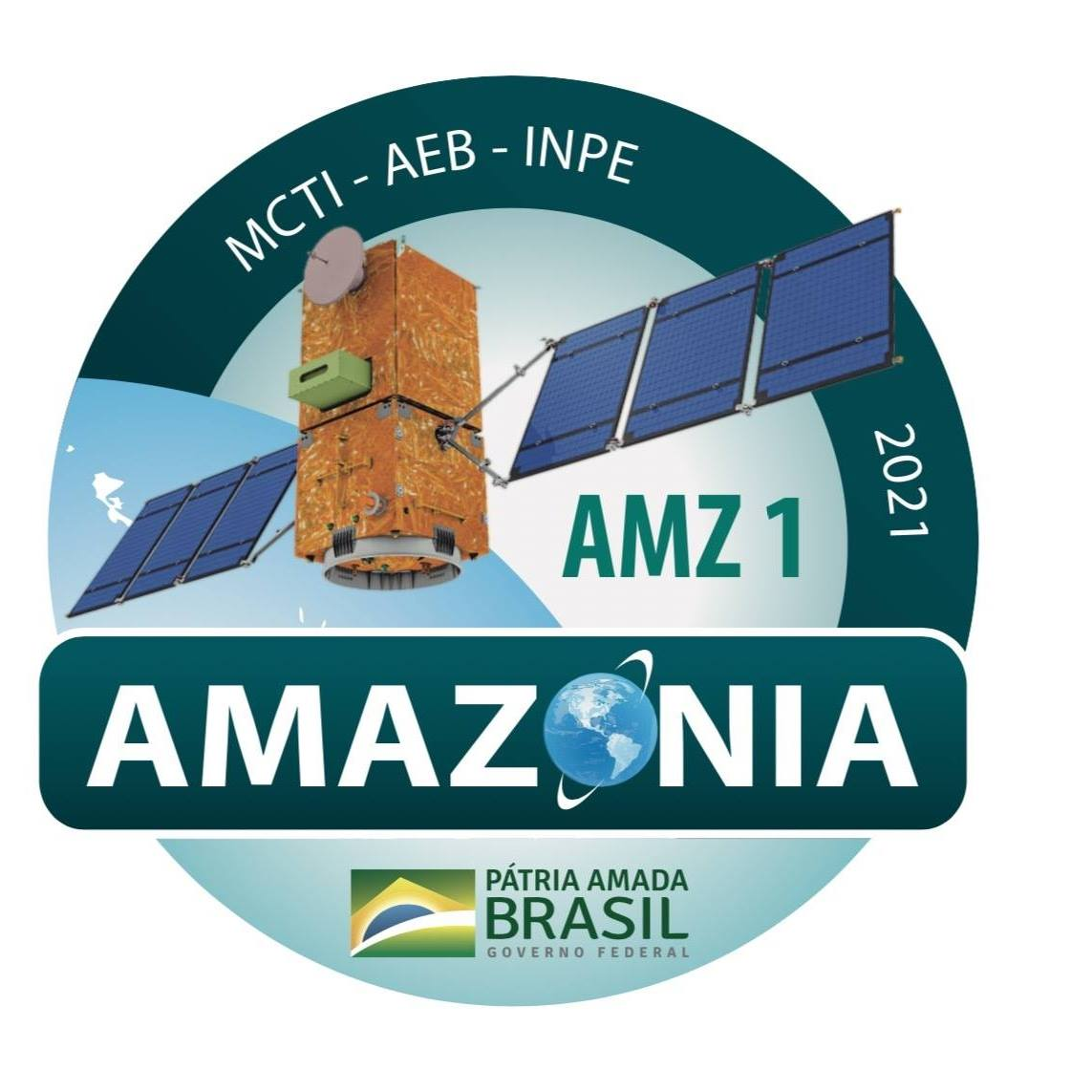
- Amazônia-1 patch satellite

The Amazônia-1 or SSR-1 (in Portuguese: Satélite de Sensoriamento Remoto-1), is the second Earth observation satellite developed entirely in Brazil, the first being the SCD series of earth orbiters launched in 1993 which are still in operation. Argentinian company INVAP supplied some components like the main computer, attitude controls and sensors. Brazilian scientists also exchanged information and gave inputs to the Argentine team in the development of such equipment to better suit their needs, and also received training on how to operate it.

The satellite was launched at 04:54:00 UTC (10:24:00 IST) on 28 February 2021. Operations will be joint with the China–Brazil Earth Resources Satellite program (CBERS-4) satellite.

== Background ==
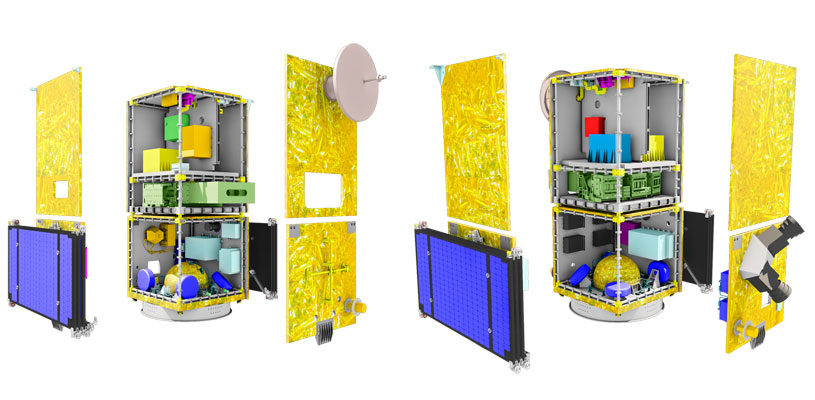
Amazonia 1 assembled

In the early 1990s, the design of SSR (Satélite de Sensoriamento Remoto) satellites, Amazônia-1 precursor, was revised and Instituto Nacional de Pesquisas Espaciais (INPE) technicians proposed replacing the polar orbit by an equatorial orbit, and this proposal was accepted. That made sense at that time as Brazil already had polar orbit coverage with the CBERS satellites. SSR-1 suffered several delays, either by lack of resources, or bid disputes. The effective start only occurred in 2001, when a contract was signed for the development of a multi-mission platform specifically, at the time, for this purpose.

In 2001, a joint study between the INPE and German Aerospace Center (DLR) was published, found that most of the SSR-1 requirements can be met by two sensors: the Camera VIS / NIR and other MIR. However, with the publication PNAE=(?) review in 2005, the SSR-1 ceased to be a priority.

== Update ==
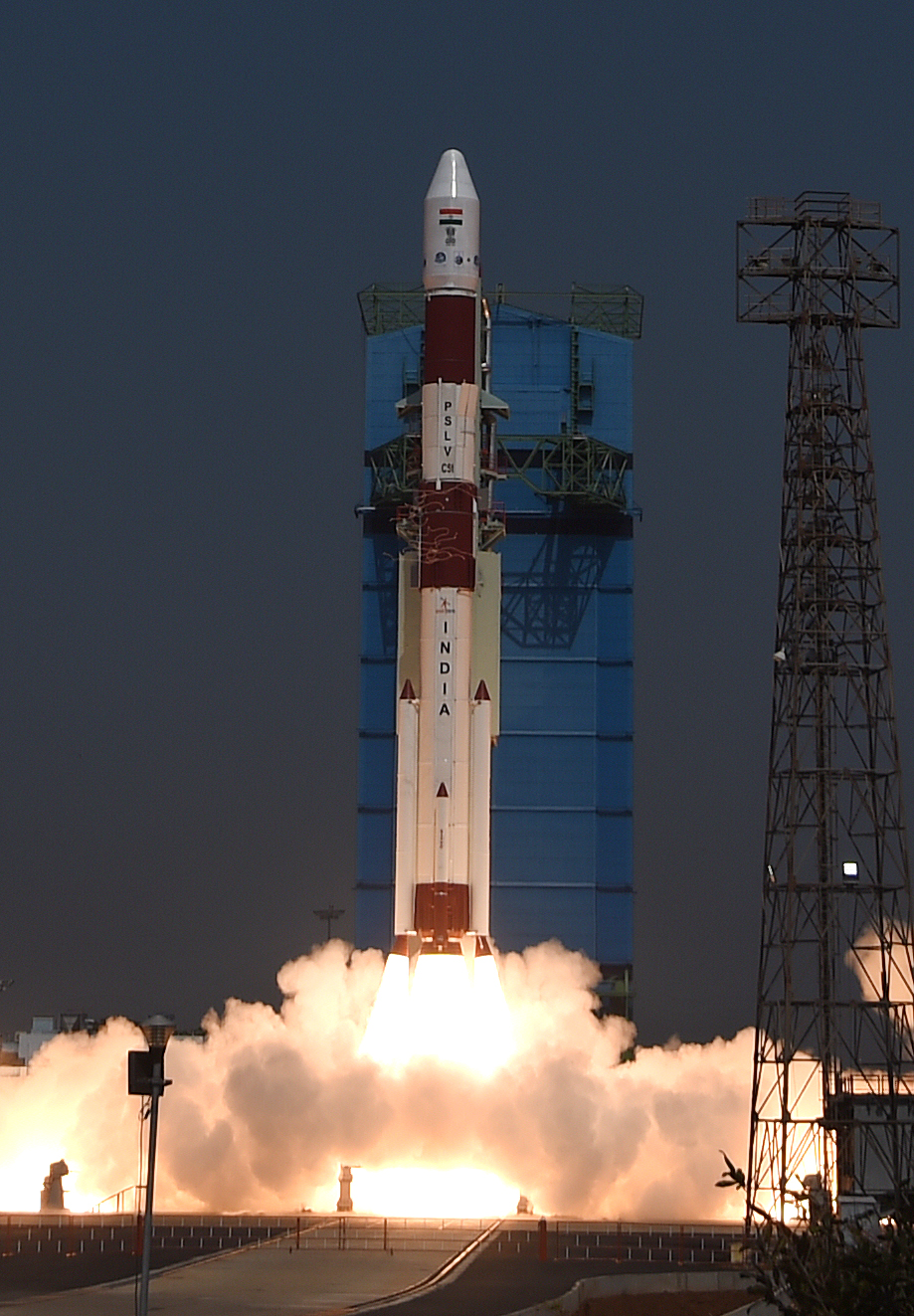
Launch of Amazônia-1

Between September and October 2012, a structural model of the Amazônia-1 satellite was subjected to a series of vibration test.

In the latest review of the PNAE, published in January 2013, the Amazônia-1 resurfaced with the same name, and even successors were planned (Amazon-1B in 2017 and Amazon-2 in 2018). However, with polar orbit as a design feature, the release dates of these satellites can not be met. The Amazônia-1 schedule is already delayed by two years.

The satellite was originally supposed to launch on a Brazilian VLS-1 rocket, but the program was cancelled.

The satellite was successfully launched on 28 February 2021 aboard ISRO's Polar Satellite Launch Vehicle (PSLV-C51) from the First Launch Pad of Satish Dhawan Space Centre. The cost of launch was nearly USD 26 million.

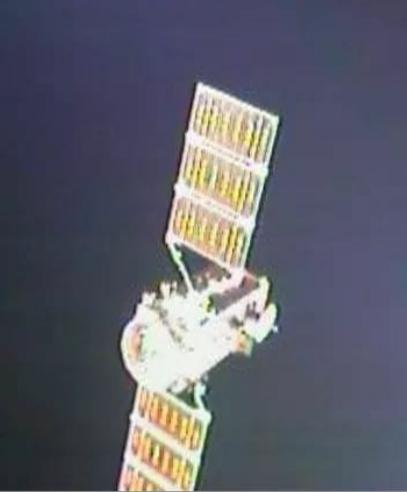
Amazônia 1 in orbit with its solar panels deployed.

=== Post-launch ===
On March 2, 2021, journalist and science communicator Salvador Nogueira reported that according to trackers in the United States, the satellite may be tipping over in its orbit, but that the situation wasn't irreversible. This occurred after the satellite was put into "mission mode," which triggered a safety program where the satellite was in an attitude that ensured its solar panels were exposed to the Sun. The journalist later posted on Twitter that the situation may be due to the satellite's release and that it had already been resolved, but is awaiting word from INPE. Later Clezio di Nardin, INPE's director, confirmed that the satellite operates normally and is going through the qualification phase, which will last until March 15. The position of Clezio di Nardin and of Marcos Pontes, Minister of Science, was that nothing unusual had happened. In a 2026 interview, Marco Antonio Chamon, president of the Brazilian Space Agency, reported that Amazônia 1 was struck by space debris, losing a small portion of its solar panel but remaining operational.

== Features ==
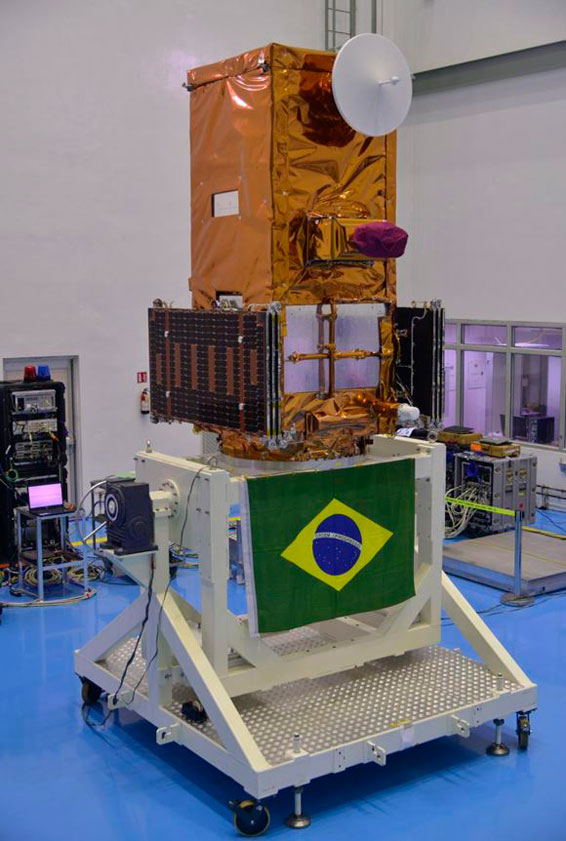
Amazonia 1 with MLI installed

The current design features are as follows:

- Orbit: Sun-synchronous orbit
- Period of Earth imaging: 4 days
- Optical sighting wide imaging (camera with 3 bands in the visible (VIS) and 1 band in the near-infrared (NIR))
- Observation range: 850 km (530 mi) with 60 m (200 ft) resolution.
- Platform: Multi-Mission Platform (MMP)
- Weight: 637 kg (1,404 lb)

== Instruments ==
- Advanced Wide Field Imager (AWFI), is a 60 m (200 ft) resolution camera.

== Amazônia-2 ==
The Amazônia-2 satellite was planned for launch in 2022 to replace its predecessor.

== Gallery ==
Images by Wide Field Imager
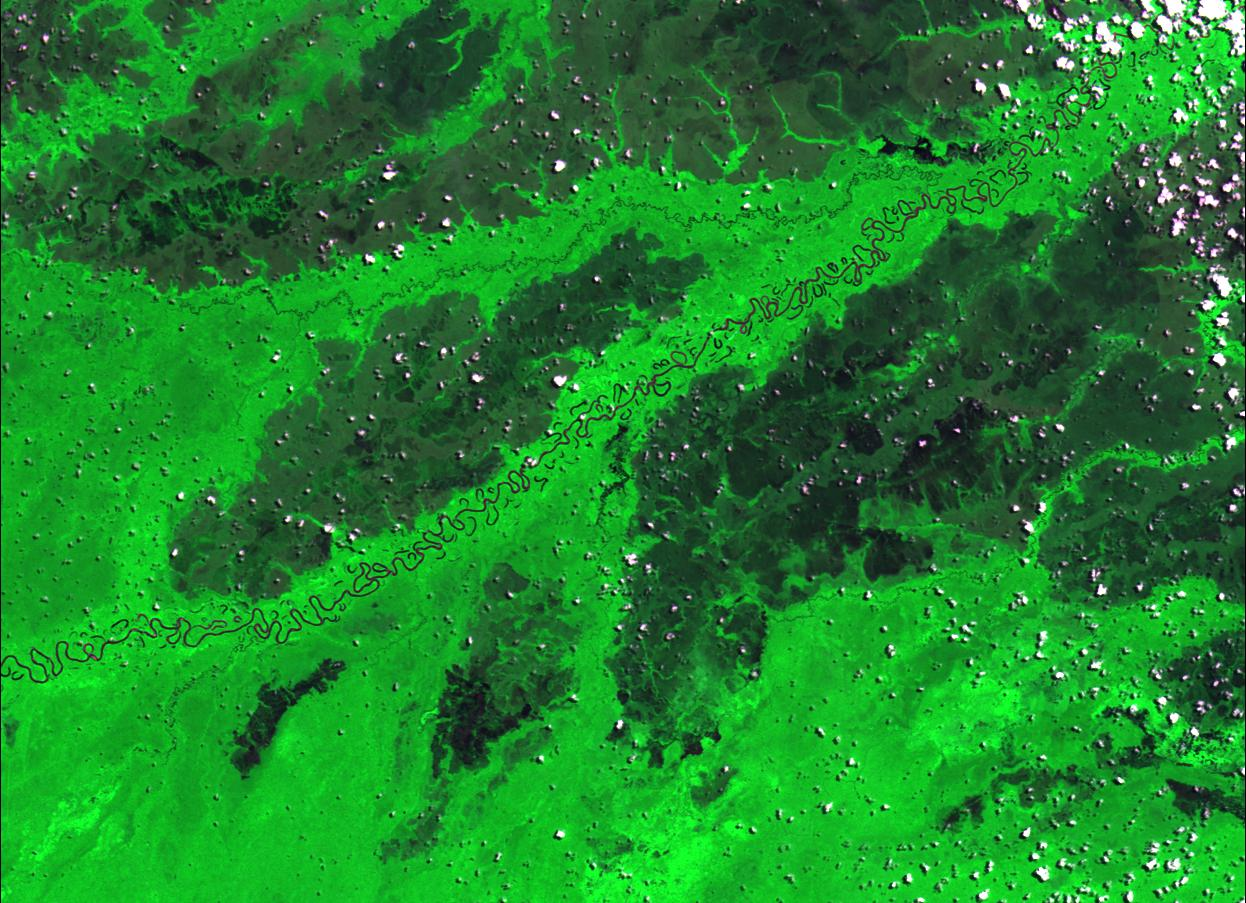
Colored composition showing the Manuripi-Heath Amazon National Wildlife Reserve, in Bolivia.

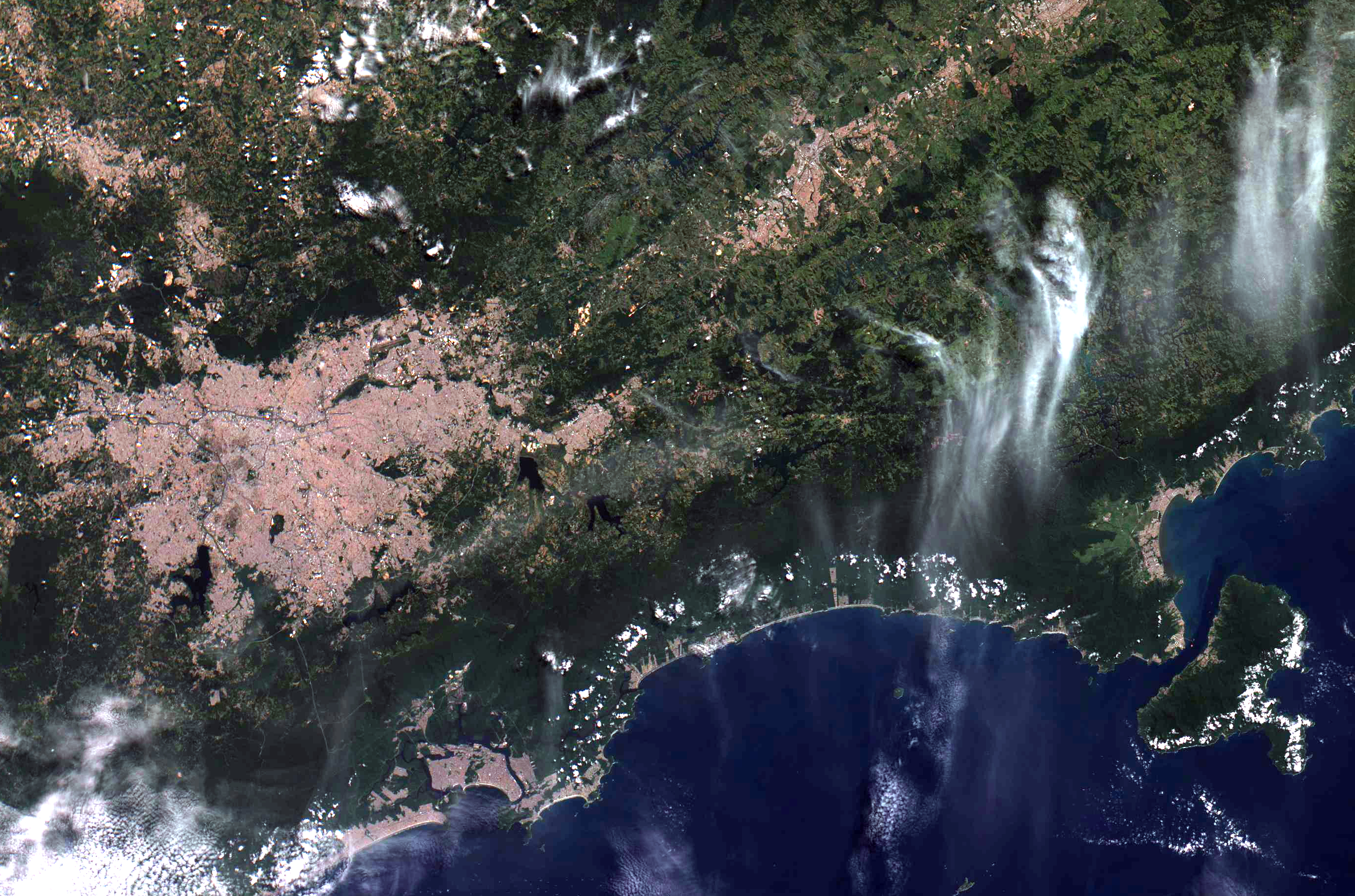
Real color image showing the metropolitan region of São Paulo and its surroundings.

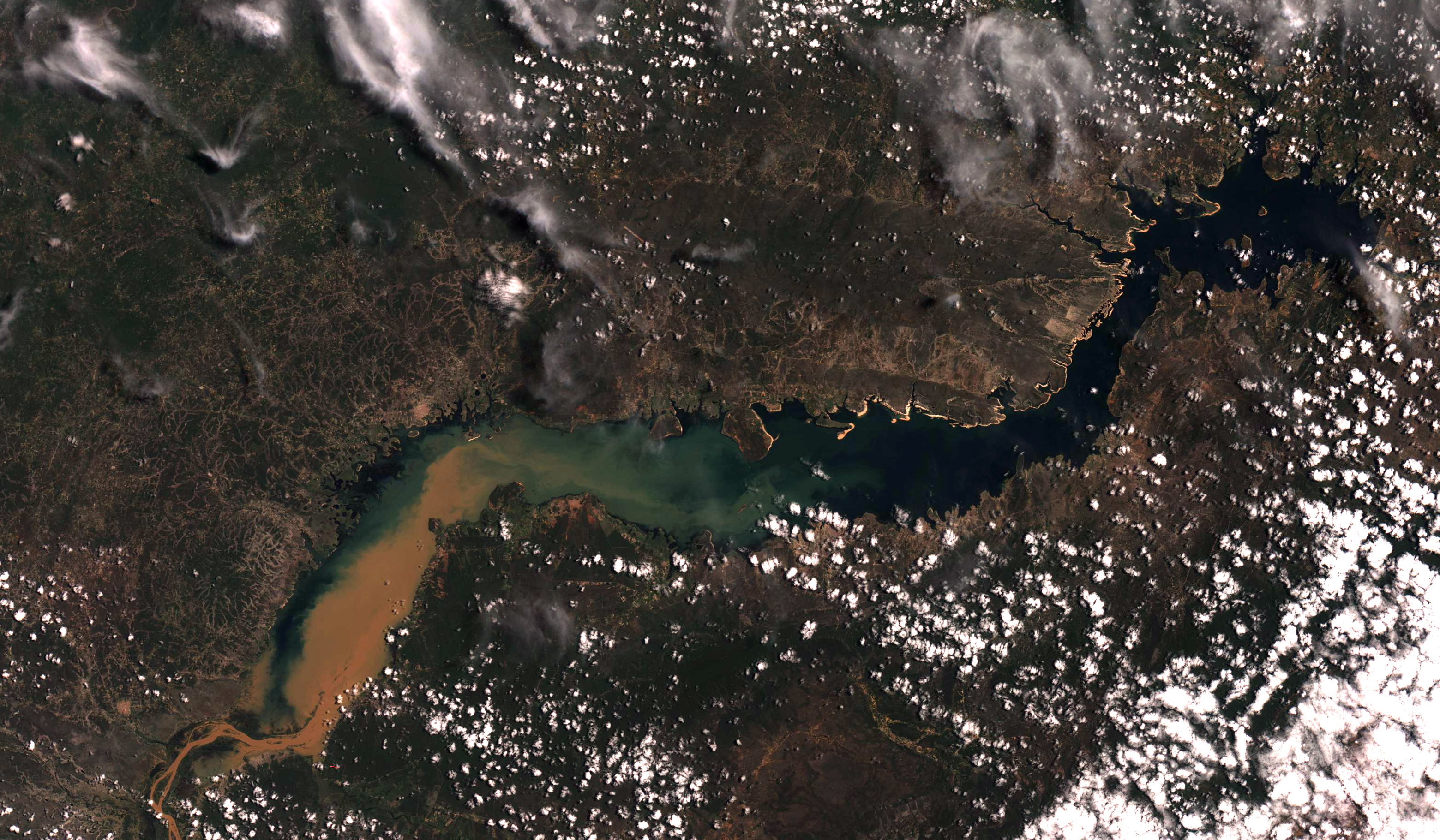
True color image showing the Sobradinho reservoir, Rio São Francisco, and its surroundings.

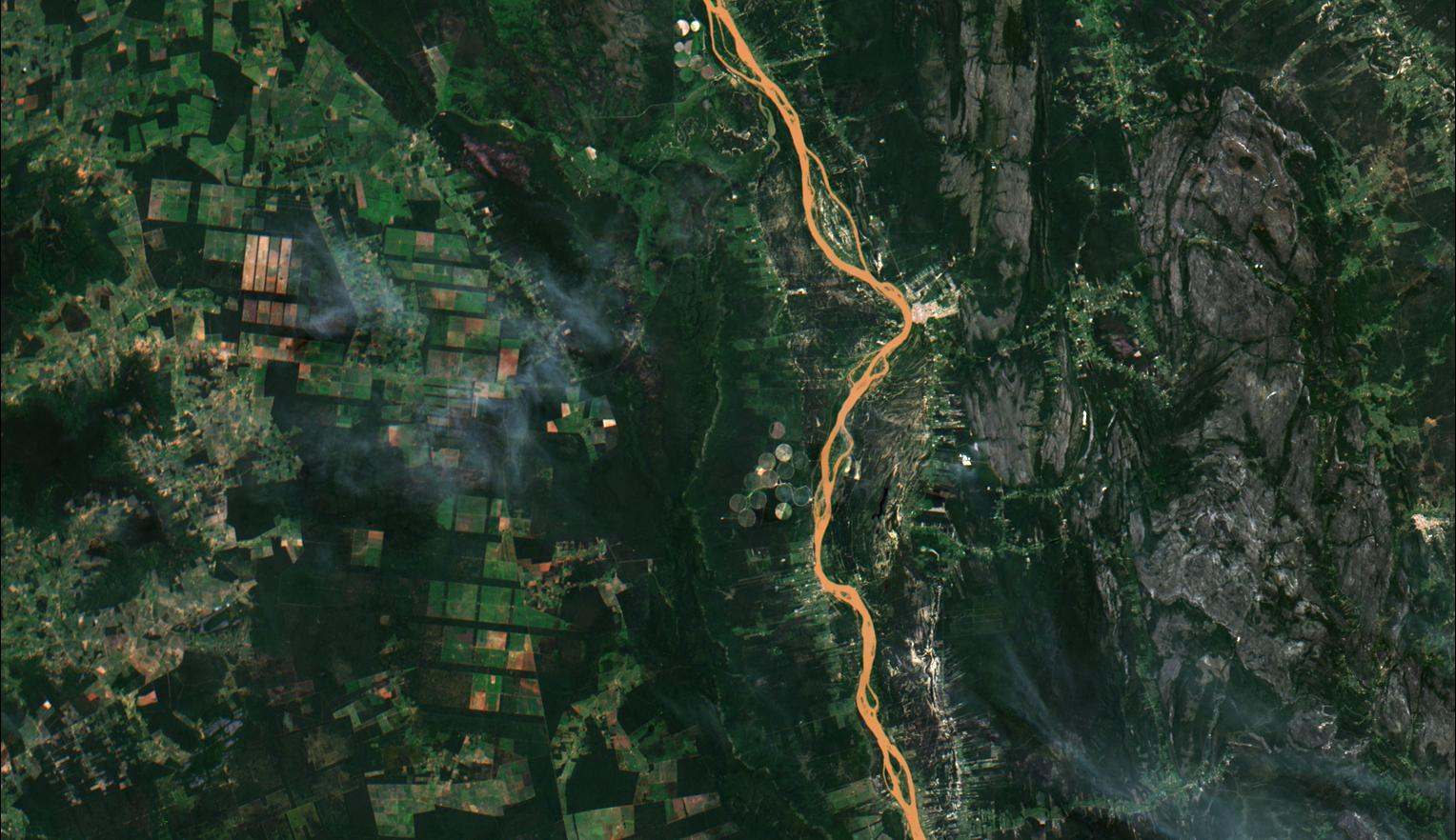
True color image of the city of Ibotirama, BA, the São Francisco River, and surroundings.

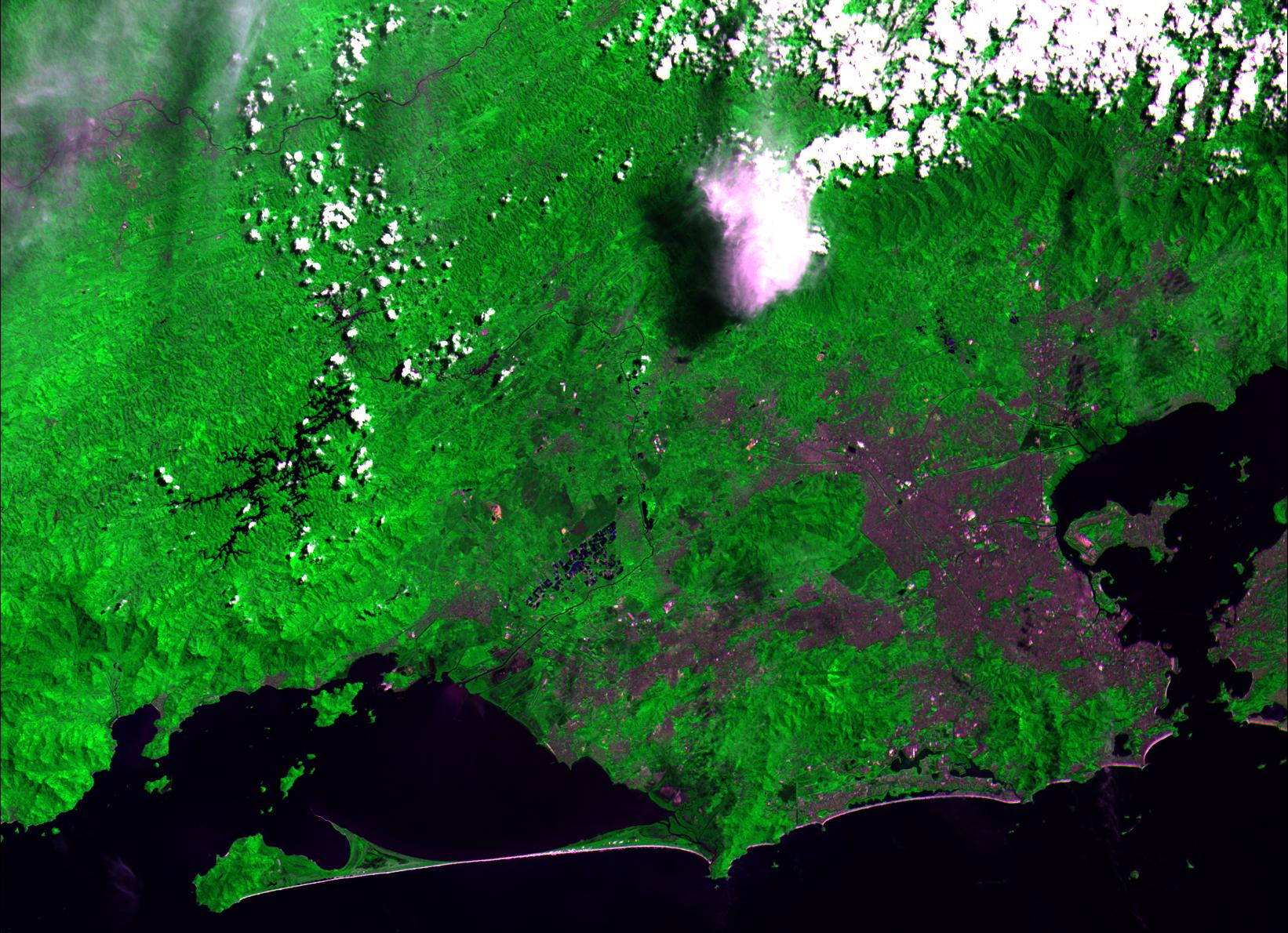
Colored composition showing the metropolitan region of Rio de Janeiro and its surroundings

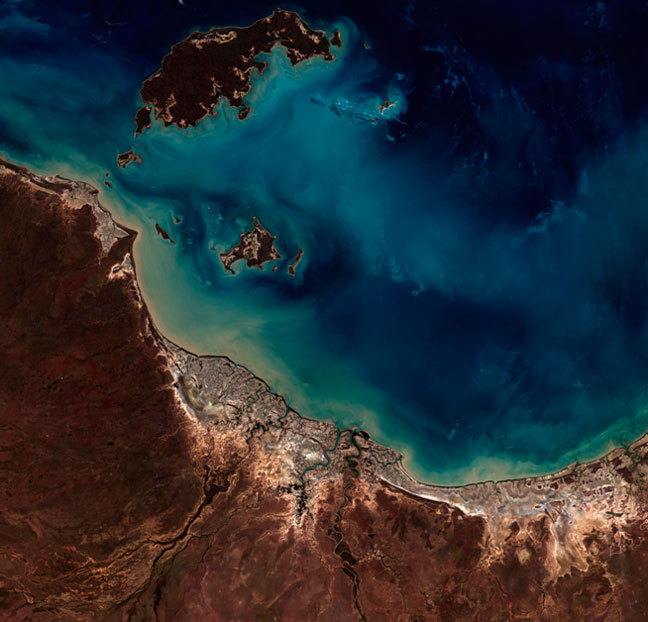
Burketown, Australia on 12 May 2021

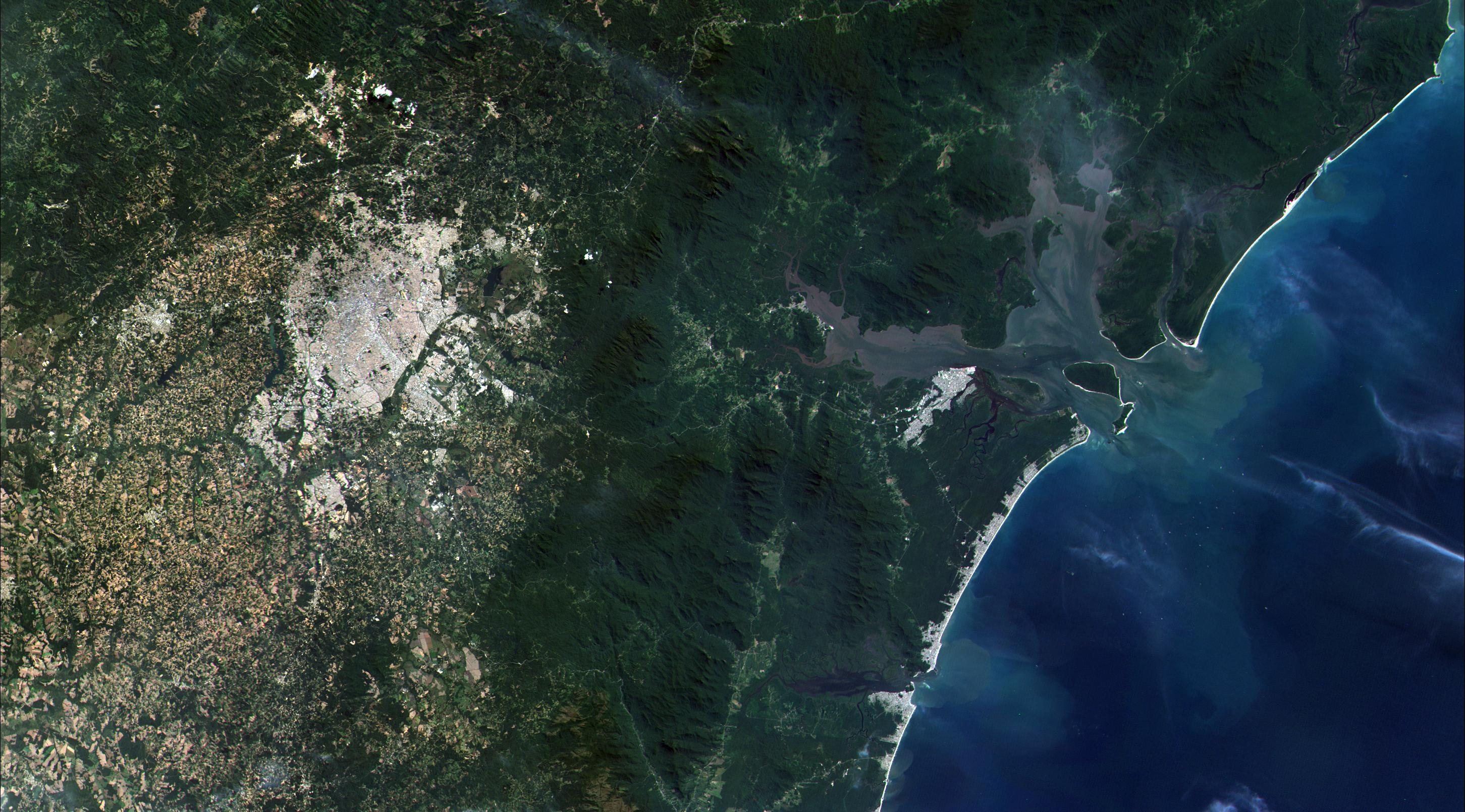
Ilha do Mel and Curitiba on 11 April 2021

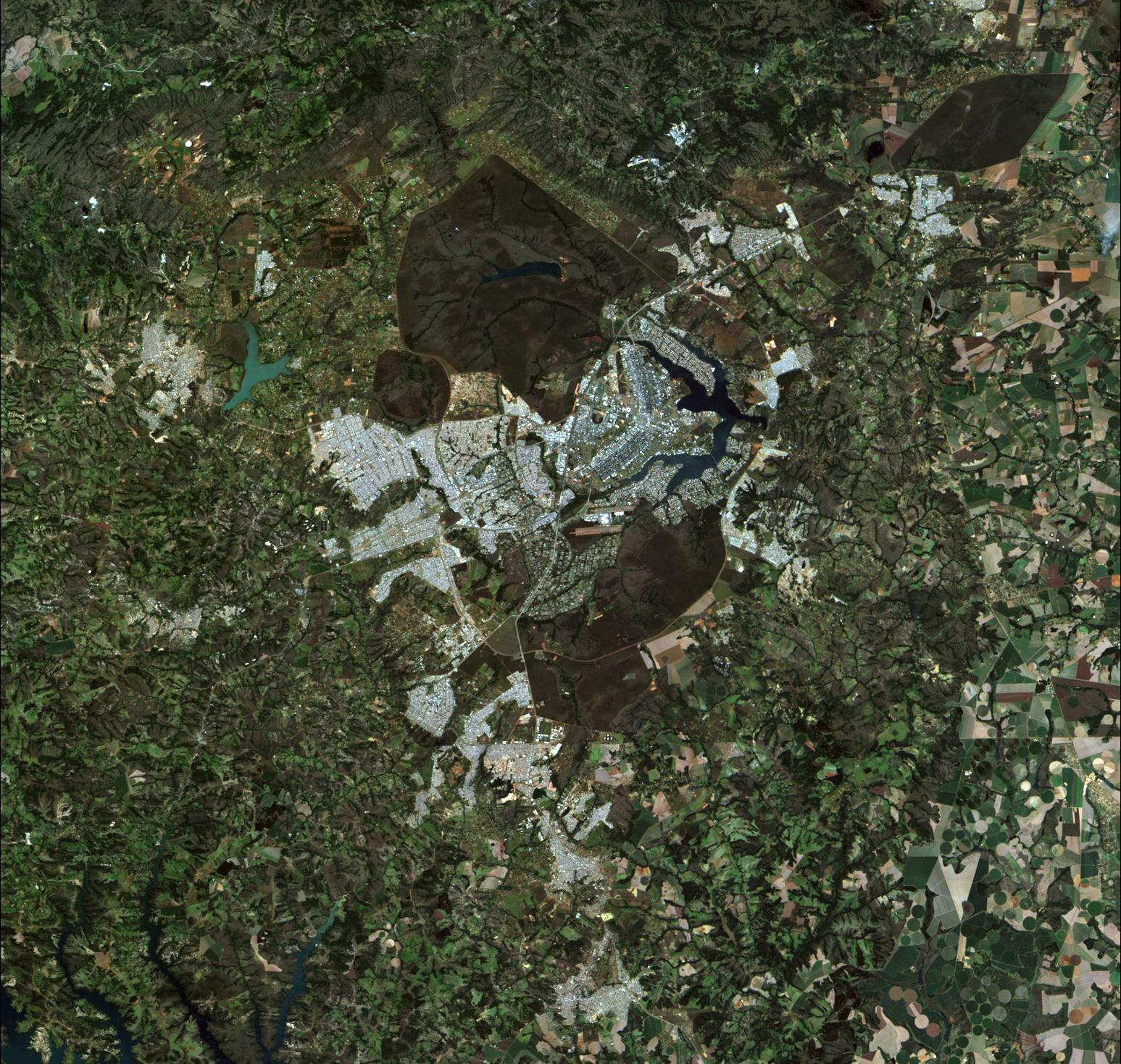
Brasília on 11 April 2021

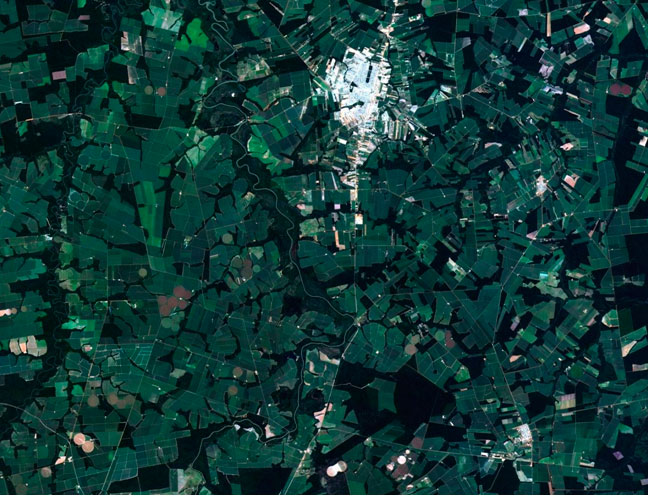
Sinop on 5 May 2021
via INPE

== See also ==
- Brazilian space program
