= PSLV-C51 =

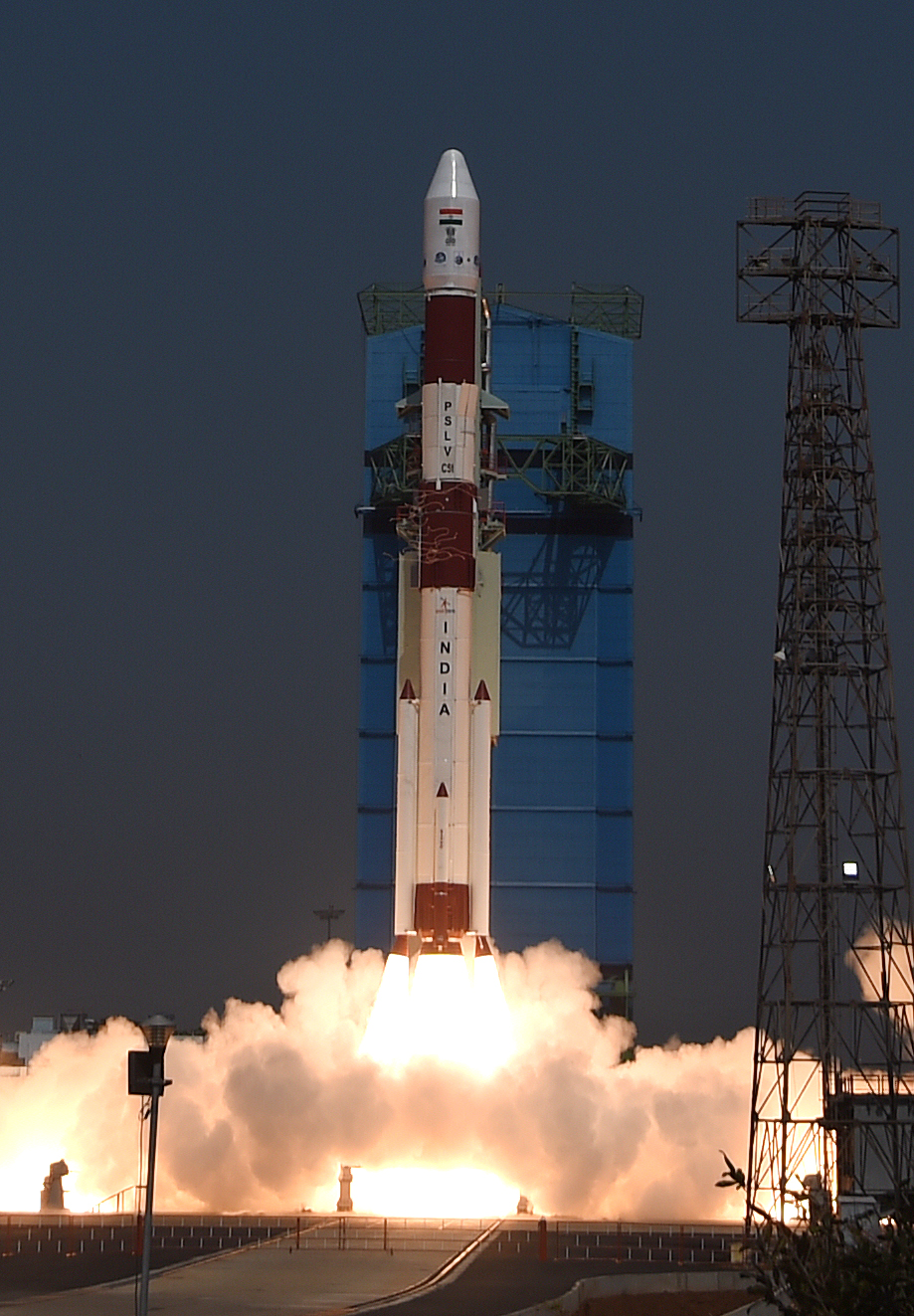
- PSLV-DL C51 lifting off from First launch pad

PSLV-DL launch
- Launch: 28 February 2021, 03:54:00 UTC
- Pad: Sriharikota First
- Payload: (Brazil) Amazônia-1 (India) Satish Dhawan Sat (India) JITsat (India) GHRCEsat (India) Sri Shakthi Sat (United States) SpaceBEE (×12) (Mexico) SAI-I - Nanoconnect-2 (India) SindhuNetra
- Launch of the PSLV-C51, with onboard footage

PSLV launches

The PSLV-C51 is the 53rd mission of the Indian Polar Satellite Launch Vehicle (PSLV) program. The Polar Satellite Launch Vehicle (PSLV)-C51 was launched at 04:54 (UTC) / 10:24 (IST) on 28 February 2021 with the main payload from Brazil, INPE's Amazônia-1 and 18 other ride-sharing small satellites.

It was the first dedicated commercial launch executed by NSIL.

== Details ==
The PSLV-C51 was launched from the First Launch Pad of the Satish Dhawan Space Centre in Sriharikota, Andhra Pradesh, India. The PSLV C51 rocket carried primary payload, Amazônia-1 and 18 secondary payloads like SDSat and three UnitySats(JITsat, GHRCEsat, Sri Shakthi Sat) etc.

It was the third flight of PSLV-DL, having 2 strap-on boosters and placed the payloads in Sun-synchronous orbits.

Private sector company Ananth Technologies worked with ISRO on the PSLV-C51 mission. The company conducted stage integration and checkout on the mission, marking the first time that ISRO had contracted a private sector company to undertake the task.

== Launch schedule ==
The launch was originally scheduled for 22 February 2021, but was delayed to 28 February owing to delays in assembly of the rocket.

== Mission overview ==
- Propellant:
  - Stage 1: Composite Solid
  - Stage 2: Earth Storable Liquid
  - Stage 3: Composite Solid
  - Stage 4: Earth Storable Liquid
- Altitude: 752 kilometres (467 mi)

The PSLV C51 rocket has four stages; each one was self-contained, with its own propulsion system, thereby capable of functioning independently. The first and third stages used composite solid propellants, while the second and fourth stage use earth-storable liquid propellant.
