= Ete =

Ete, Été or ETE may refer to:

== People ==
- Erik Zabel (born 1970), German cyclist known by the nickname "Ete"
- Douglas Ete (born 1964), Solomon Islands politician
- Eteuati Ete, New Zealand actor

== Other uses ==
- ETE (tokamak) at the National Institute for Space Research in Brazil
- Ete, Hungary
- National Bank of Greece, a commercial bank
- Été, French word for Summer
