= Sonia Guimarães =

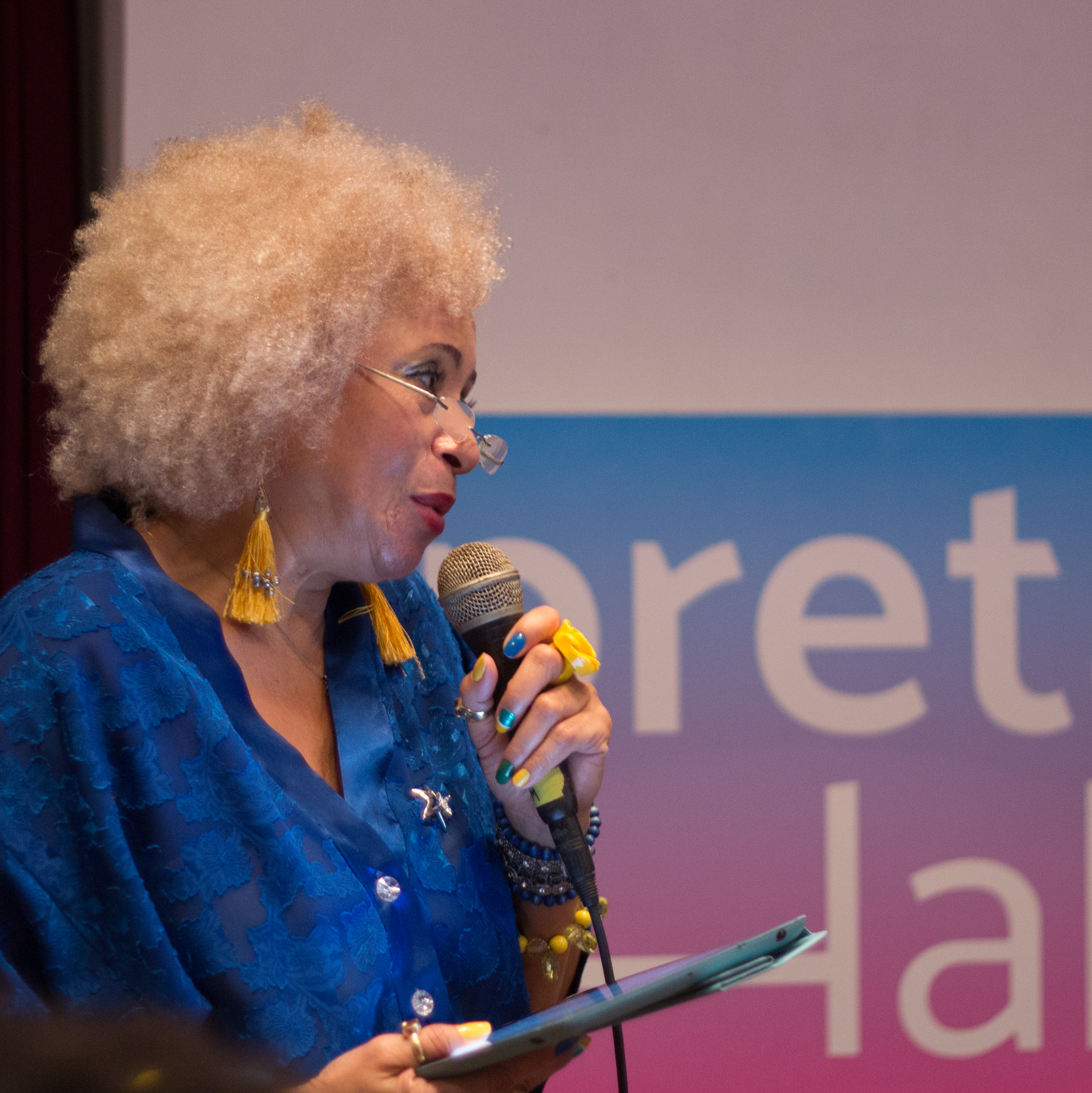
- in 2018 by Safira Moreira
- Born: 20 June 1956 (age 70); São Paulo, Brazil
- Education: Federal University of São Carlos; University of Manchester Institute of Science and Technology
- Scientific career
- Workplaces: Instituto Tecnológico de Aeronáutica; University of Bologna

Sonia Guimarães (born 20 June 1956) is a Brazilian physicist. She is a Professor of Physics at the Instituto Tecnológico de Aeronáutica. She was the first black Brazilian woman to earn a doctorate in physics and has dedicated her career to improving the representation of black Brazilians in academia.

== Early life and education ==
Guimarães was born in São Paulo. Her father worked on tapestries and her mother was a merchant. At primary school and secondary school Guimarães was always the top of the class, but she experienced racism as a child. She worked part-time during school and used the money that she earned to pay for college. Whilst at high school Guimarães wanted to become an engineer, and sat the Mapofei entrance exam that was a requirement for entry to the University of São Paulo. In 1976 she became the first member of her family to attend university when she joined the Federal University of São Carlos. During her first year she encountered physics for the first time; and during her course on solid state physics decided that she loved the subject. She remained there for her master's degree, where she worked on ellipsometry. After completing her undergraduate degree Guimarães moved to Italy where she joined the University of Bologna and worked on microelectronics. In 1986 Guimarães moved to the United Kingdom. Guimarães joined the University of Manchester Institute of Science and Technology as a doctoral student, where she worked alongside Anthony Peaker. In 1989 she became the first black woman in Brazil to earn a doctorate in physics. Guimarães has said that she was not aware of this until her story was featured on the website Black Women of Brazil.

== Research and career ==
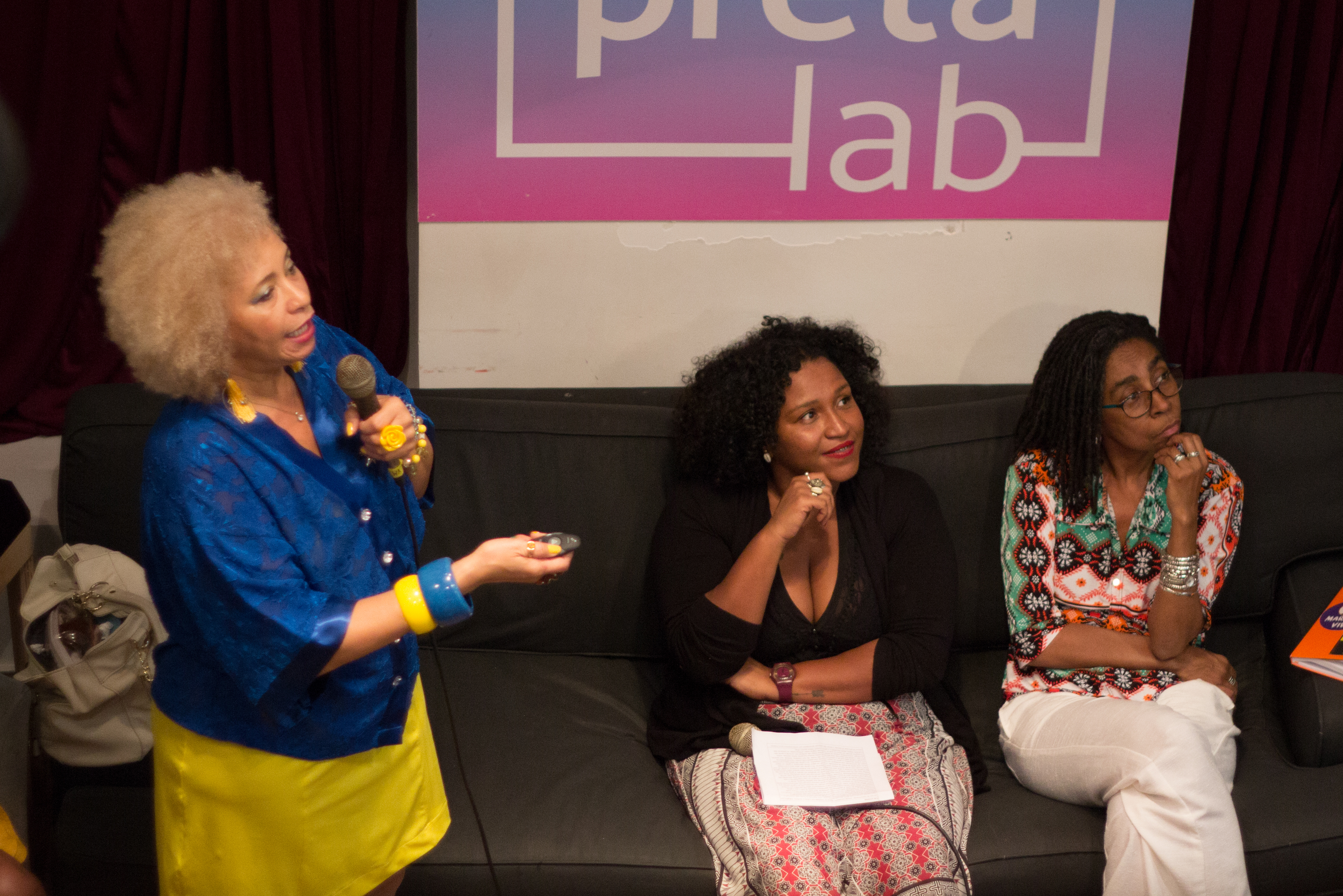
Guimarães advocating for black women in 2018 with Silvana Bahia and Jurema Werneck of Amnesty International.

Guimarães joined the Instituto Tecnológico de Aeronáutica in São José dos Campos in 1993. She was the first black woman to do so, and joined at a time that women were not allowed to enter the ITA. Whilst women were allowed to enter the university toward the end of 1995, they are still underrepresented to this day – from 2013 to 2018 less than 10% of the students who entered the Instituto Tecnológico de Aeronáutica were women. Her research considers electron transport in epitaxially grown semiconductor alloys and the development of novel materials for sensing applications. In 2014 Guimarães delivered a TED talk "Educação é a única solução" (Education is the only solution).

Alongside her academic research Guimarães has worked to improve diversity in Brazilian research. In particular, she has looked to support women and black people, who make up over half of the Brazilian population but are severely underrepresented in universities. She has given a series of academic lectures about her experiences of racism in academia and the impact of affirmative action programmes. She was awarded the Black Race Trophy in recognition of her advocacy work. In 2019 the Instituto Tecnológico de Aeronáutica announced that it would join the quota system for black students. Whilst Guimarães had considered retiring, she wants to stay there for the first year of quota students.
