= Fernando de Mendonça =

Brazilian electronic engineer (born 1975)

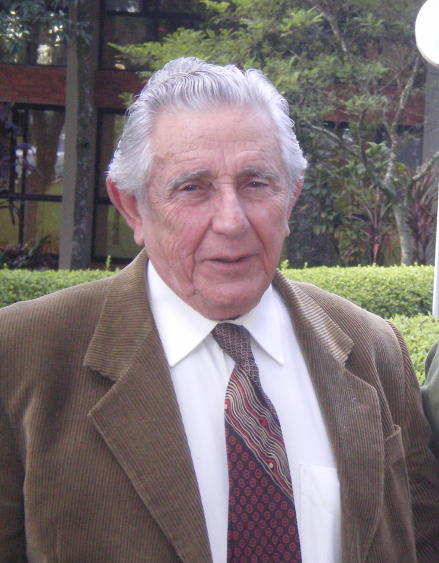
Fernando de Mendonça.

Fernando de Mendonça (born December 2, 1924, in Guaramiranga, Ceará) is a Brazilian electronic engineer and researcher, founder and first director of Brazil's National Institute for Space Research.

== Career ==
Mendonça graduated in Electronic Engineering at the Instituto Tecnológico de Aeronáutica (ITA) in 1958. After, he received his PhD in Radio sciences from Stanford University, in the USA.

During his period in the United States, Mendonça established contacts with NASA in the name of the Brazilian government, contacts that later played an important role in the early development of the Brazilian Space Program.

After his return to Brazil, he was nominated by President Jânio Quadros to take part in the preliminary committee in charge of the studies for the deployment of the national space program. A few years after the National Institute for Space Research (INPE) was founded (originally as a national space activities commission, with the designation CNAE, in 1961) Mendonça became its first effective director.

He was interviewed about his career in 2024, aged 99.
