= Jean Paul Jacob =

Jean Paul Jacob was a Brazilian electronic engineer, researcher and professor.

He received his electronic engineering degree from the Instituto Tecnológico de Aeronáutica, in Brazil, and his MS and PhD degrees in Mathematics and Engineering from the University of California, at Berkeley, in 1966.

After working in France in industrial and academic research laboratories in Systems and Control, and then at the IBM Nordic Laboratory, in Stockholm, he migrated in 1963 to the United States where he was assigned to the San José IBM Research Laboratory in California, now the Almaden IBM Research Laboratory. He was then involved in developing high level simulations of a space laboratory for NASA. After receiving his PhD at Berkeley, he resumed his academic career when he returned to Brazil in 1969, where he worked for the University of São Paulo (USP), the Instituto Tecnológico de Aeronáutica (ITA) and the Federal University of Rio de Janeiro (UFRJ) where he created the Systems Department. Most of his publications were in mathematical journals, with some in Systems Theory. He was the co-author of a book on System and Control Theory published in Japan.

In 1980 he returned again to his native Brazil to create the first IBM Scientific Center of South America, as well as an Institute for Software Engineering.

For many years he was the IBM research manager at the IBM Almaden Research Center, in California, while also a visiting scholar at Stanford and Berkeley, having taken one year sabbaticals from IBM Research at Stanford and twice at Berkeley.

He retired from IBM in October 2002, but returned as a researcher Emeritus.

Jean Paul received over 50 awards during his career, two of which from UC Berkeley, the 1992 Distinguished Alumnus Award in Computer Science and Engineering and the University of California Research Leadership Award in 2003. Dr. Jacob was an elected member of the IBM Academy of Technology, whose membership consists of the top technical leaders from around the world who are working in research, hardware and software development, manufacturing, applications, and services. He was featured in over 200 articles published by the written media in 12 countries, as well as featured on at least 30 TV programs on science and technology, 2 of which on CNN.

Dr. Jacob was heavily involved in the creation of the Center for Information Technology Research in the Interest of Society (CITRIS) at the University of California, as representative of the first Founding Member of CITRIS, namely IBM, in 2000. He also organized yearly workshops in different areas, including nanotechnology, energy and services, between UC Berkeley, CITRIS, and IBM. He was also an annual speaker for the Management of Technology (MOT) interdisciplinary program at UC Berkeley.

Jean Paul Jacob died on April 7, 2019.

== See also ==
- List of University of California, Berkeley alumni
