= Albert Francis Zahm =

American aeronautical experimenter and professor of physics

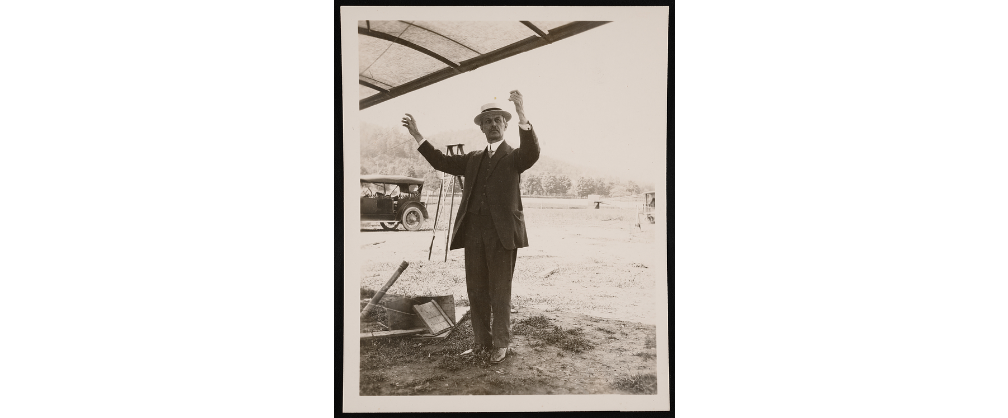
- Zahm in 1930
- Born: 1862; New Lexington, Ohio, U.S.
- Died: July 23, 1954; Notre Dame, Indiana, U.S.
- Education: University of Notre Dame; Cornell University; Johns Hopkins University
- Known for: testimony in Wrights v. Curtiss
- Awards: Laetare Medal
- Scientific career
- Fields: Aeronautics
- Workplaces: University of Notre Dame; Catholic University; Library of Congress
- Thesis: The resistance of the air determined at speeds below one thousand feet a second, with description of two new methods of measuring projectile velocities inside and outside the gun. (1898)
- Doctoral advisors: Joseph Sweetman Ames; Henry Augustus Rowland; Louis Duncan
- Doctoral students: Richard Harbert Smith

Albert Francis Zahm (1862 – July 23, 1954) was an early aeronautical experimenter, a professor of physics, and a chief of the Aeronautical Division of the U.S. Library of Congress. He testified as an aeronautical expert in the 1910–14 lawsuits between the Wright brothers and Glenn Curtiss.

== Time line of early life and work in aeronautics ==
- Received A.B., University of Notre Dame, Indiana, 1883, A.M., 1885, M.S. 1890; M.E. Cornell University, 1892; Ph.D., Johns Hopkins University, 1898. Albert's brother John was on the Notre Dame faculty while Albert was a student there.
- Professor of Mathematics, University of Notre Dame 1885–1889, mathematics and mechanics, 1890–1892.
- Zahm suggested to Octave Chanute to stage an International Conferences on Aerial Navigation in 1893. Zahm acted as Secretary, with Chanute as Chair.
- He was a professor of mechanics (physics) at The Catholic University of America, from 1895 apparently until 1913–1914 (but one source says only till 1908).
- In 1901, as part of a pioneering aeronautical laboratory, Zahm built a wind tunnel with financing from Hugo Mattullah. It operated until 1908. It has been described as "America's first significant wind tunnel."
- He joined the Aero Club of America shortly after it was founded, in 1905.
- Zahm's 1911 book Aerial Navigation described the historical development of experimental aircraft that led to functional airplanes.

== Testimony in Wrights vs. Curtiss ==
Zahm testified as an aeronautical expert in the 1910-1913 patent lawsuits by the Wright brothers who alleged patent infringement against inventor and manufacturer Glenn Curtiss. His testimony took over a month. He testified on behalf of Curtiss after declining to testify for the Wrights, possibly because the Wrights refused to pay Zahm to appear as an expert witness whereas the Curtiss interests did. Zahm had been on friendly terms with both sides previously but became a long term adversary of the Wrights during and after the trial. He worked closely with Glenn Curtiss on the controversial 1914 flying tests of the (substantially rebuilt and modified) Langley Aerodrome in an attempt to show that Langley's machine had been capable of powered flight with a man aboard before the Wrights' glider was.

Zahm testified that earlier experimental gliders and glider designs and publications, before those of the Wrights, had included a variety of monoplane and biplane designs, with horizontal and vertical rudders, and steering concepts of ailerons and wing warping. There were complex technical issues, notably whether Curtiss's airplanes used a vertical rudder and ailerons in ways that closely matched the patented design of the Wrights. Experts testified on both sides and sometimes contradicted one another on matters of fact. In the end judge John R. Hazel ruled in Feb. 1913 for the Wrights, and on appeal a higher court agreed with this decision in 1914.

== Later years ==
Zahm became the chief research engineer of Curtiss Aeroplane Company in 1914–1915 and then the director of the U.S. Navy's Aerodynamical Laboratory, 1916–1929.

Zahm became the chief of the Aeronautical Division at the Library of Congress from 1929 or 1930 until 1946, and held the Guggenheim Chair of Aeronautics there.

Zahm died on July 23, 1954, in Notre Dame, Indiana, at the age of 92. He was buried in the Community Cemetery, Notre Dame, Indiana.

== Honors ==
- Zahm was invited to be a member of the Cosmos Club of Washington, DC, and received his mail there while on the faculty of Catholic University.
- Recipient of Laetare medal at University of Notre Dame, 1925.
- Awarded the Mendel Medal at Villanova College in 1930 for his pioneering work in scientific aeronautics.
- Daniel Guggenheim Chair of Aeronautics in the Library of Congress, 1929–1946.

== Publications, bibliography and archival information ==
More than 100 of his articles and papers were collected in Aeronautical papers 1885-1945 of Albert F. Zahm, volumes I and II. He wrote the book Aerial Navigation (1911), and a booklet called Early Powerplane Fathers in 1946.

Zahm's papers are kept by the University of Notre Dame.
