= Casimiro Montenegro Filho =

Brazilian general (1904–2000)

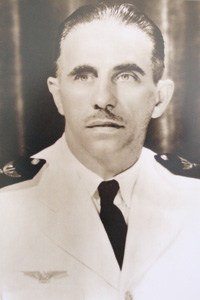
- Casimiro Montenegro Filho
- Born: 29 October 1904; Fortaleza, Brazil
- Died: February 26, 2000 (aged 95); Petrópolis, Brazil
- Military career
- Allegiance: Brazil
- Branch: Brazilian Air Force
- Rank: Marechal-do-ar (Air Marshal or Marshal of the Air)

Casimiro Montenegro Filho (29 October 1904 – 26 February 2000) was a Brazilian army and air force officer. He reached the rank of Marechal-do-ar, the highest rank of the Brazilian Air Force rank system.

Born in Fortaleza, Montenegro joined Military School of Realengo in 1923, and in 1928 became an Aspirant in the Brazilian army's first class of aviators for its new Military Aviation Arm. He later served under Eduardo Gomes, another future Marshal of the Air.

In 1943, while a lieutenant-colonel, he proposed the creation of the Instituto Tecnológico de Aeronáutica - ITA (Aeronautical Technology Institute) - and the Centro Técnico de Aeronáutica - CTA (Aeronautics Technical Center), later Centro Técnico Aeroespacial - CTA (Aerospace Technical Center) and Comando-Geral de Tecnologia Aeroespacial - CTA (Brazilian General Command for Aerospace Technology), nowadays the Departamento de Ciência e Tecnologia Aeroespacial - DCTA (Department of Aerospace Science and Technology).

Two years later, that proposal was translated into a plan, with the collaboration of MIT Professor Richard Harbert Smith, who became, in the sequence, the first rector of ITA. Montenegro died in Petrópolis at the age of 95.
