= Gilberto Câmara =

Brazilian computer scientist (born 1956)

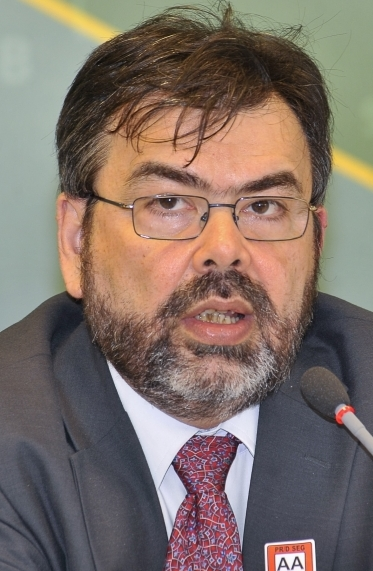
- Gilberto Câmara, January 2005
- Born: 29 March 1956 (age 70); Fortaleza (Brazil)
- Education: ITA, INPE
- Known for: Amazon deforestation monitoring
- Awards: Pecora Award
- Scientific career
- Fields: Remote sensing
- Workplaces: INPE
- Doctoral advisor: Marco Antônio Casanova

Gilberto Câmara (born 29 March 1956) is a Brazilian computer scientist and is currently serving as the Secretariat Director for the Group on Earth Observations (GEO). He is a former director of Brazil's National Institute for Space Research (INPE) (from 2006 to 2013). He was head of INPE's Image Processing Division from 1991 to 1996 and Director for Earth Observation from 2001 to 2005.

He is a researcher in the areas of Geographical Information Science, Spatial Databases, Spatial Analysis and Environmental Modelling. Gilberto is the principal investigator in the area of Spatial Databases and Spatial Environmental Models in the GEOMA research network for Environmental Modelling of Amazonia. He is responsible for setting up data policies for CBERS images in Brazil and abroad, and for creating INPE's Remote Sensing Data Center, which has put 30 years of imagery on-line. He was also responsible for setting up a system for real-time detection of deforestation in Amazonia and for making PRODES deforestation maps available on the Internet.

He is a professor in INPE's graduate programs in remote sensing and computer science, a member of Scientific Steering Committee of the Global Land Project and of the editorial board of the Journal of Earth Science Informatics. In 2011, he received an honorary doctorate from the University of Münster.
