= Richard Harbert Smith =

American aeronautical engineer

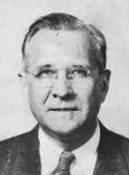
- Prof. Richard Harbert Smith (MIT). (1946)
- Born: January 15, 1894; Dillsboro, Indiana, United States
- Died: July 6, 1957 (aged 63); Alexandria, Virginia
- Education: Moores Hill College (today, University of Evansville); Massachusetts Institute of Technology; Johns Hopkins University
- Known for: pioneering research in aeronautics
- Scientific career
- Fields: Aeronautics
- Workplaces: United States Naval Research Laboratory; Massachusetts Institute of Technology; Instituto Tecnológico de Aeronáutica
- Thesis: Aerodynamic theory and test of strut forms. (1929)
- Doctoral advisor: Albert Francis Zahm
- Doctoral students: Manfred Rauscher

Richard Harbert Smith (15 January 1894, Dillsboro, Indiana – 6 July 1957, Alexandria, Virginia) was a professor and researcher of aeronautical engineering at the Massachusetts Institute of Technology (MIT), from 1929 to 1945.

His academic education was developed at the Moores Hill College (BS, 1915), Indiana (today, University of Evansville); the Massachusetts Institute of Technology (SB, 1918), Cambridge (Greater Boston), Massachusetts; and the Johns Hopkins University (MA, 1928; PhD, 1929), Baltimore, Maryland.

After World War I, Prof. Smith worked as an assistant at the United States Naval Research Laboratory. In 1929, he was an associate physicist at the Navy's laboratory when he was hired by the Massachusetts Institute of Technology as an associate professor of aeronautical engineering, being promoted to full professor in 1931.

For many years, he was Dr. Jerome Clarke Hunsaker's assistant administrator for aeronautical engineering at MIT.

During the World War II period, Prof. Smith coordinated the MIT Civilian Pilot Training Program and was also instructor for several classes of female engineering trainees for the Curtiss company.

In 1945, he left MIT to go to Brazil, hired by the Brazilian government, in a venture led by Casimiro Montenegro Filho, then lieutenant-colonel of the Brazilian Air Force, to establish an institute of aeronautics, the Instituto Tecnológico de Aeronáutica (Aeronautical Technology Institute), of which he became the first rector. This was an outstanding contribution to the scientific and technological education in Brazil.
