= Instituto Tecnológico de Aeronáutica =

Brazilian higher education institution

Coordinates: 23°12′36.48″S 45°52′36.41″W

- Instituto Tecnológico de Aeronáutica
- Type: Public
- Established: 1950
- Rector: Antonio Guilherme de Arruda Lorenzi
- Faculty: 202
- Administrative staff: 170
- Undergraduates: 501
- Postgraduates: 1790
- Location: São José dos Campos, São Paulo, Brazil
- Campus: Urban, inside CTA's campus
- Website: www.ita.br

The Instituto Tecnológico de Aeronáutica (ITA; English: Aeronautics Institute of Technology) is an institution of higher education maintained by the Brazilian Air Force and is located in São José dos Campos, Brazil. ITA is consistently ranked as one of the top engineering schools in Brazil and engages in advanced research in aerospace science and technology.

ITA is one of five institutes that encompass the Brazilian General Command for Aerospace Technology (CTA), having its facilities, along with its laboratories and R&D centers, inside the campus of CTA. Despite its status as a military institution, ITA accommodates civilian professors, directors, and students.

ITA offers regular 5-year engineering undergraduate courses (Bachelor of Engineering) and graduate programs including masters and doctoral degrees.

== History ==
Casimiro Montenegro Filho, the founder of ITA, hired renowned foreign professors and experts from various parts of the world to teach at ITA, the majority of them from the MIT, influenced by Prof. Richard Smith. At a given time of its history, ITA had professors from more than 20 different nationalities in its faculty, an impressive number, considering it had (and still has) a faculty of little more than 100 professors. Nowadays the overwhelming majority of the professors are Brazilians, many of whom have themselves graduated from ITA.

=== Expansion ===
In 2024 it was announced that ITA will build a new campus in the city of Fortaleza, in the state of Ceará, that is set to receive its first students in 2027.

== Undergraduate Courses ==
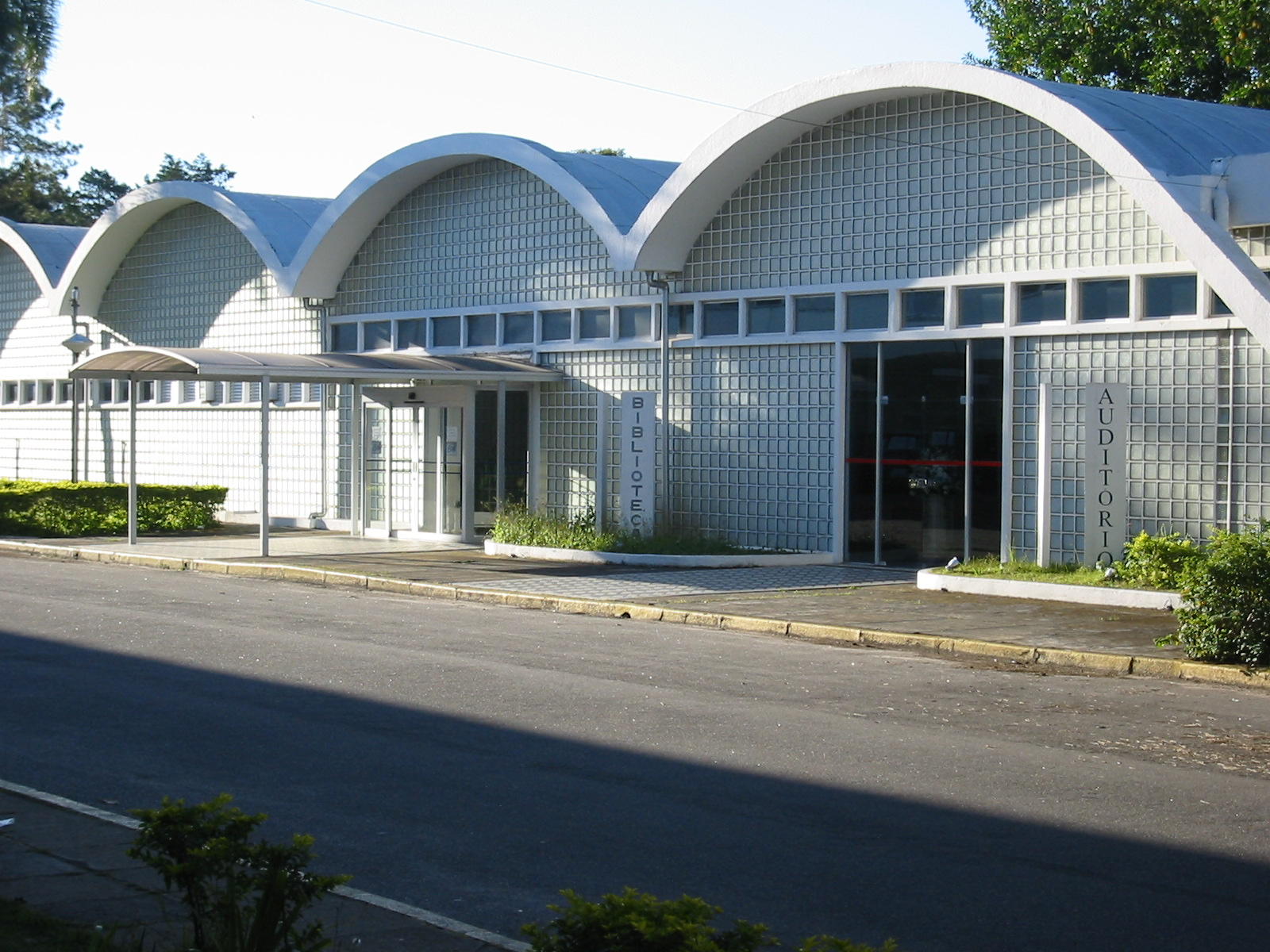
Library of ITA, designed by Oscar Niemeyer

All ITA undergraduate students must complete two years of fundamental courses before entering the professional course they intend to take. The six steams of professional courses available to students for study include:

- Aeronautical Engineering
- Aerospace Engineering
- Civil-Aeronautical Engineering
- Computer Engineering
- Electronic Engineering
- Mechanical Engineering

== Graduate programs ==
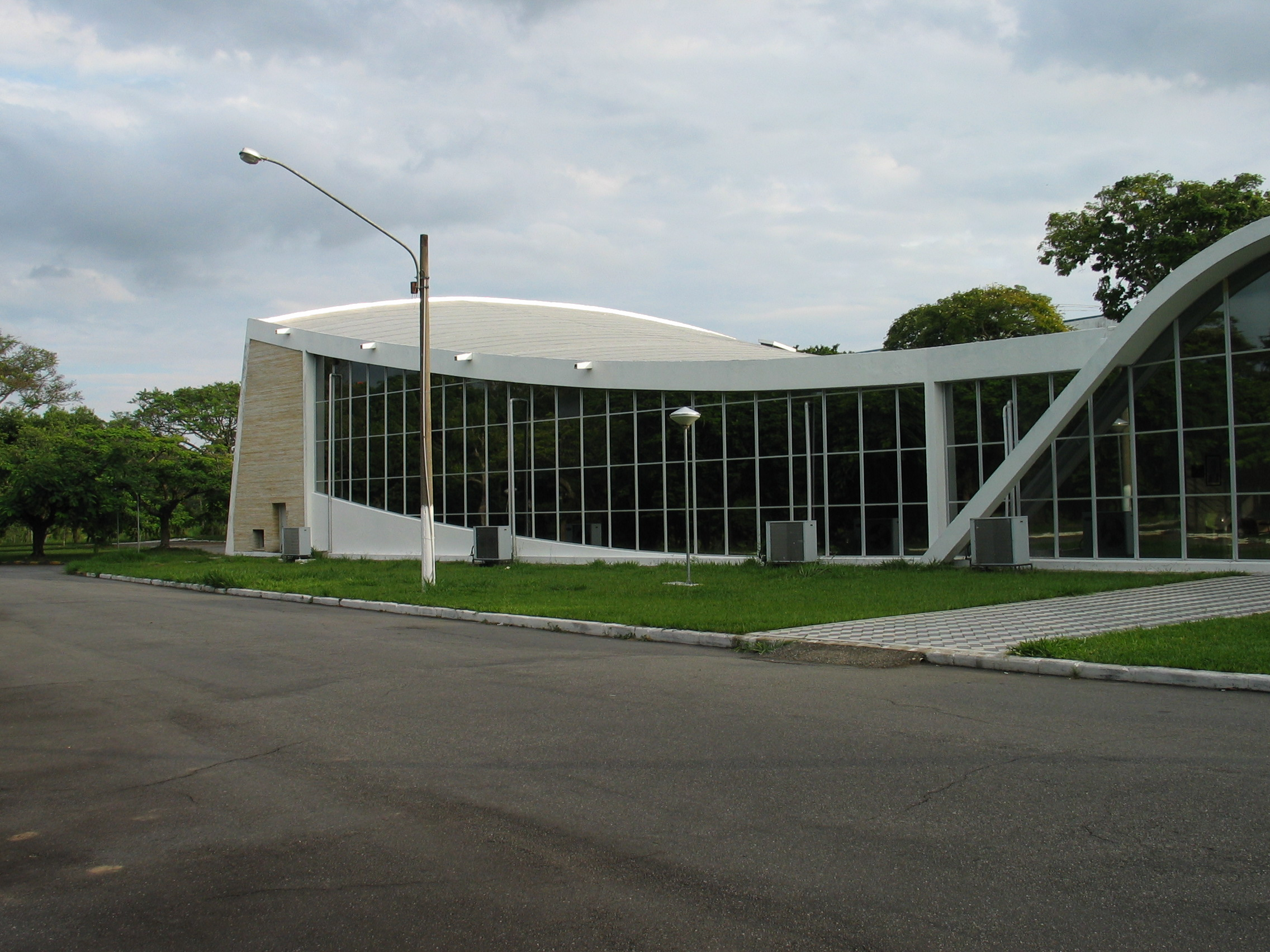
External view of ITA's auditorium, designed by Oscar Niemeyer

ITA offers masters and doctoral programs through five general streams, with 20 areas of concentration between them, including:

- Aeronautical & Mechanical Engineering
- Aeronautical Infrastructure Engineering
- Electronic & Computer Engineering
- Physics
- Space Science & Technology

== Student life ==
All undergraduate students are granted full scholarships. Complete residential facilities are offered to the students during the entire five-year period at a minimal cost. ITA students are provided with free, self-served meals four times a day.

== Military career ==
During their first year at ITA, all students are considered to be military personnel and are required to attend a military preparation course once a week and receive monthly cost-of-living allowances for it during this period. For male students, this fulfills their obligatory military service, which all male citizens in Brazil are required to attend.

Due to ITA's position as an institute maintained by the Brazilian Air Force, undergraduate students may choose to join the military upon graduation as engineering officers or keep their status as civilians members of the reserve. After the first year, students not opting for a military career return to being civilians and stop receiving their pay.

Approximately 20% of admitted undergraduate students choose a military career during their second year and be paid as student of the Reserve Officers Training Body. These students will continue the military preparation course once every two weeks. They will begin wearing uniforms during their 3rd year at ITA until graduation. Upon graduation, they are promoted to the rank of 1st lieutenant engineer and must serve for 3 years.

== Economic impact ==
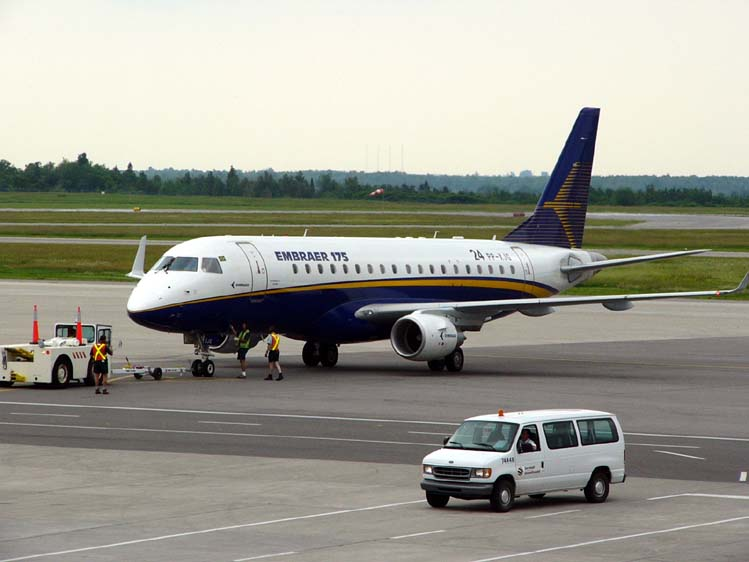
An Embraer 175, one of the newest and most successful jets produced by the company

The institution was created in 1950, being responsible and contributing in a great extent for the research and development of the aerospace and defense sectors in Brazil, including the Brazilian National Institute for Space Research - INPE, Embraer and Avibrás.

- From ITA's foundation, as of 2018, 6,466 engineers had graduated from the undergraduate program and 6,134 from postgraduate courses.
- EMBRAER alone, which was created by ITA's undergraduate alumni, currently employs hundreds of engineers from ITA, generating a positive net export balance of $1.529 billion in 2005, over 150 times the yearly investment made in ITA by the Brazilian Government. In that year, between aircraft and aircraft parts categories, São José Dos Campos exported $3.57B (USD) or 81.9% of the total exports of the municipality.
- By the time ITA was created, its home town, São José dos Campos, had about 44,000 inhabitants and its economy was mainly rural. By 2018 the city had grown to 883,943 inhabitants, or 2,528,354 when the metropolitan area is counted, and in 2014 ranked as the 5th largest exporter, by value, of all Brazilian municipalities exporting $4.6B (USD) worth of materials.

== Admissions (Undergraduate) ==
ADMISSIONS STATISTICS
| Year | Total Admission Exam Candidates | Accepted | Acceptance Rate |
|---|---|---|---|
| 2019 | 10,788 | 110 | 1.02% |
| 2018 | 11,135 | 110 | 0.98% |
| 2017 | 12,484 | 110 | 0.88% |
| 2016 | 12,493 | 140 | 1.12% |
| 2015 | 7,792 | 160 | 2.05% |
| 2014 | 7,279 | 170 | 2.34% |
| 2013 | 7,285 | 120 | 1.65% |
| 2012 | 9,337 | 120 | 1.29% |
| 2011 | 7,627 | 120 | 1.57% |
| 2010 | 6,503 | 120 | 1.85% |
| 2009 | 6,215 | 120 | 1.93% |

The school's undergraduate admission exams (called vestibular in Brazil) are considered the most competitive in the country. They take place annually in over 25 cities throughout Brazil. Students are selected exclusively on their grades in the exam. ITA accepts 110 undergraduate students per year, who are distributed into the 5 available Engineering courses according to availability and preference indicated at the time of applying.

ITA's admission exam is infamous for its difficulty, even when compared to other top universities in Brazil. Math, Physics and Chemistry are often approached beyond high-school level, thus candidates have to study undergraduate-level textbooks. Candidates often need an extra year of intense study after high-school, and many take the test multiple times before being selected.

The exam is composed of two phases: the first includes general tests in each of Mathematics, Physics, Chemistry, Portuguese and English. The English exam is only eliminatory, requiring candidates to achieve a minimum set score. The second phase includes exams in Mathematics, Physics, Chemistry and an Essay in Portuguese. In this phase, all tests have equal weight. The candidates with the highest average grades are admitted in, provided they reach a minimum qualifying grade in each of the 4 exams.

Another university in Brazil has similar admission exams: Instituto Militar de Engenharia (Military Institute of Engineering - IME), which is maintained by the Brazilian Army. Candidates usually prepare for both exams. Virtually all candidates approved at ITA are also approved at IME, but choose the former.

== Course Evaluation Results ==
From 1996 to 2003, the Brazilian government conducted yearly evaluation exams for every undergraduate course in Brazil. Written exams, specific to every different type of college course, were given to every student at the time of their graduation and the results were used to evaluate the quality of the college courses and schools in Brazil. These exams were called Provão ("big test", in English).

Provão's Electrical Engineering results in 2003 - top 10 schools
| School | Avg. Grade (out of 100) |
|---|---|
| ITA | 79.6 |
| IME | 75.2 |
| UFRGS | 66.3 |
| UFMG | 66.0 |
| USP (São Paulo) | 62.7 |
| UNICAMP | 62.2 |
| UFRJ | 60.4 |
| UFES | 59.6 |
| USP (São Carlos) | 57.6 |
| UNESP | 56.4 |

Based on the average grade obtained by the students' course, every school was given a grade from 'A' to 'E' for each of its courses, with 'A' being the best. ITA was the only institution in Brazil to have obtained only 'A's in all the years of Provão, for all of its courses. The Provão results are somewhat misleading, though, as the grades are given by ordering the average grades of the schools in a list and giving the label 'A' to a certain predefined number of schools, and so on. Therefore, two schools that were given the grade 'A' can have substantially different scores, and that is usually the case. The actual grades for each school were not announced by the government, but a list with the highest average grades in 2003 "leaked" and was published by the national magazine Veja.

The published list showed that the courses of Electronic and Computer Engineering at ITA, which both took the exam of Electrical Engineering, attained the highest average grade of the whole Provão in 2003. Its students had an average grade of 79.6 of a total of 100. This average was about 5 point higher than IME's, the 2nd position for Electrical Engineering, with 75.2, about 14 points higher than the 3rd position, UFRGS, with 66.3, and about 17 point higher than renowned USP and UNICAMP with 62.7 and 62.2, respectively. It was about 24 points higher than the 10th position for this course. That is a relative difference of more than 40%. All ten schools published in the list attained an 'A' grade at Provão.

It is now known that in almost every year of Provão up to 2003 ITA's courses figured in either first or second place in its categories, usually competing with IME, both within considerable distance from the remaining schools. It is hard, though, to point references for such information, as it usually comes from unofficial sources or scattered news from journalists that had access to leaked information. INEP, the government institute which conducts these evaluations, publishes the results of all Provões at its website, but only shows the alphabetic grade and percentiles in which the students from the institution are (usually more than 90% of ITA's students figure between the top 25% grades in Provão). In 2003 94,3% of ITA's Electronic and Computer Engineering students were between the 25% top grades of the exam.

In the first edition of ENADE for Engineering in 2005, successor of Provão, which is only held about every 3 years, ITA's Computer Engineering course once again achieved the highest grade of its category. For the ENADE the government is publishing the actual average grade of each school at INEP's website. In 2008, ITA's Electronics Engineering courses scored the highest evaluation grade among all university courses from the areas evaluated in 2008, which included all engineering areas, computer science, math, architecture, among others. The course evaluation grade of ITA's Electronics Engineering was 485, out of a maximum of 500, based on the test results of the students graduated in 2008.

== Notable Professors ==
- Francis Dominic Murnaghan (mathematician) – former Albert Einstein student, founder of Department of Mathematics
- Sonia Guimarães - first Black Brazilian to earn a doctorate in physics; hired as a professor before women were admitted to ITA

== Notable alumni ==
In alphabetical order:

- Carlos Cesnik, Clarence L. (Kelly) Johnson Collegiate Professor of Aerospace Engineering at University of Michigan
- Carlos Henrique de Brito Cruz, former dean, UNICAMP; science director, FAPESP
- Carlos Nobre, Brazilian scientist and meteorologist
- Cássio Taniguchi, Brazilian congressman (as of 2006)
- Dimas Lara Barbosa, Rio de Janeiro auxiliary bishop, Roman Catholic Church in Brazil
- Fernando de Mendonça, founder and first director of Brazil's National Institute for Space Research (INPE)
- Gilberto Câmara, director of Brazil's National Institute for Space Research (INPE) from 2006 to 2013
- Jean Paul Jacob, research leader IBM
- Kristo Ivanov, research leader (1984–2002) and professor emeritus of informatics, Umeå University
- Marcos César Pontes, first Brazilian astronaut
- Ned Kock, professor of Information Systems, Texas A&M International University
- Ozires Silva, founder and former CEO, EMBRAER, former president of Petrobras, and former minister of infra-structure
- Reginaldo Silva, security engineer, notable for identifying an arbitrary code execution bug at Facebook

== See also ==
- Brazilian Air Force Academy
- Brazil University Rankings
- Universities and Higher Education in Brazil
- Institute of Aeronautics and Space
