= ETE (tokamak) =

Experimento Tokamak Esférico
- Device type: Spherical tokamak
- Location: Brazil
- Affiliation: National Institute for Space Research

Technical specifications
- Major radius: 0.3 m (1 ft 0 in)
- Minor radius: 0.2 m (7.9 in)
- Magnetic field: 0.1 T (1,000 G)
- Discharge duration: 6–12 ms
- Plasma current: 40–60 kA

History
- Year(s) of operation: 2000–present

The Spherical Tokamak Experiment (Portuguese: ETE - Experimento Tokamak Esférico) is a machine dedicated to plasma studies in low aspect ratio tokamaks. The ETE was entirely designed and assembled at the Associated Plasma Laboratory (Laboratório Associado de Plasma, LAP) of Brazil's National Institute for Space Research (INPE).

== Development ==
The ETE is a spherical tokamak with major radius of 0.3 m and minor radius of 0.2 m. It began operations in late 2000.
