= Progress in Aerospace Sciences =

- Discipline: Aeronautics, astronautics
- Language: English
- Edited by: K.J. Badcock, M.F. Platzer

Publication details
- History: 1961–present
- Publisher: Elsevier
- Frequency: Monthly
- Impact factor: 8.940 (2019)

Standard abbreviations
- ISO 4: Prog. Aerosp. Sci.

Indexing
- ISSN: 0376-0421
- LCCN: 82642139
- OCLC no.: 645323666

Links
- Journal homepage; Online archive

Progress in Aerospace Sciences is a monthly peer-reviewed scientific journal covering all areas of aerospace and aerospace engineering. It covers all areas of aerospace and aerospace engineering, particularly with respect to new theoretical and experimental developments and their applications in research, industry, and university. The journal aims to serve as a general-purpose aerospace journal, condensing the ever-expanding, increasingly multidisciplinary field of aerospace into one publication. The journal is intended for a broad readership - generally anyone either active or simply interested in the aerospace field. The editors-in-chief are K.J. Badcock (University of Liverpool) and M.F. Platzer (Naval Postgraduate School). It was established in 1961 and is published by Elsevier. Originally the journal published articles written in English, French, and German, but since 1972 it has been published entirely in English.

== About ==
The first edition of Progress in Aerospace Sciences was published in 1961, and the journal been published continuously since 1994. For its entire history, it has been published in Oxford, United Kingdom. Until 1972, the journal published articles written in both English and French, while it has been published entirely in English since.

The journal was created with the purpose of collecting all the latest developments in the numerous subsidiary fields of aerospace engineering – including dynamics, structures, flight mechanics, materials, vibrations, aeroelasticity, acoustics, propulsion, avionics, wind engineering, and hydrodynamics – and condensing them into one single publication that gives readers a comprehensive summary of the latest advances in the aerospace field. Articles are specifically commissioned by the review board for each issue. Authors may submit their articles through Elsevier, provided they fall within the criteria specified by the review board. Most issues have articles from several different fields within aerospace engineering, though the journal will occasionally publish special issues that focus on one specific field or development. The latest such issue was published in October 2015, titled Special Issue: DAEDALOS – Dynamics in Aircraft Engineering Design and Analysis for Light Optimized Structures.

While articles have no prescribed length and can vary from a few pages to over 100 pages, each article does follow several content and formatting standards. Authors are encouraged to provide an introduction to their field at the beginning of each article, summarizing the history and recent work in their field, in order to acclimate readers to the latest developments in field other than their own. Authors are also expected to provide an abundance of graphs and images in their articles, again to familiarize more general aerospace readers. Because the journal encourages authors to provide an abundance of background information, Progress in Aerospace Sciences can easily be read and understood by readers with little experience in aerospace.

Like many peer-reviewed journals, the majority of Progress in Aerospace Sciences' readership comes online. In shifting from print to digital publication, the journal has adapted several content innovations, including interactive graphs and MATLAB plots, to engage readers. While the content and overall mission of the journal have stayed the same throughout its lifespan, there has been a notable shift in style. Older articles tend to be almost exclusively text-based, while recent articles feature an abundance of graphs and figures, making articles more accessible for an increasingly visual user base. Because of its recent innovations and the growth of the aerospace industry, Progress in Aerospace Science has experienced an increase in readership in the 21st century.

== Abstracting and indexing ==
The journal is abstracted and indexed in:

- CSA databases
- Current Contents/Engineering, Computing & Technology
- EI/Compendex
- EBSCO databases
- Inspec
- Science Citation Index
- Scopus

According to the Journal Citation Reports, the journal has a 2019 impact factor of 8.940.
