= National Institute for Space Research =

Brazilian space technology organization

National Institute for Space Research Instituto Nacional de Pesquisas Espaciais
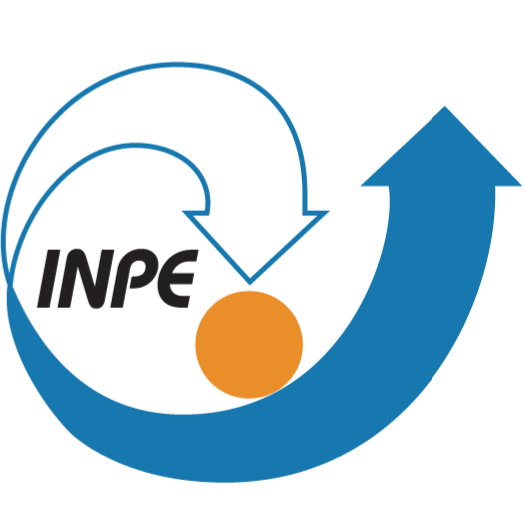
- Abbreviation: INPE
- Formation: April 22, 1971
- Legal status: Active
- Purpose: Space research
- Headquarters: São José dos Campos, São Paulo
- Coordinates: 23°12′25″S 45°51′37″W
- Official language: Portuguese
- Director: Gilvan Sampaio de Oliveira
- Parent organization: Ministry of Science, Technology and Innovations
- Budget: R$79.9 million (2021)
- Website: gov.br/inpe/

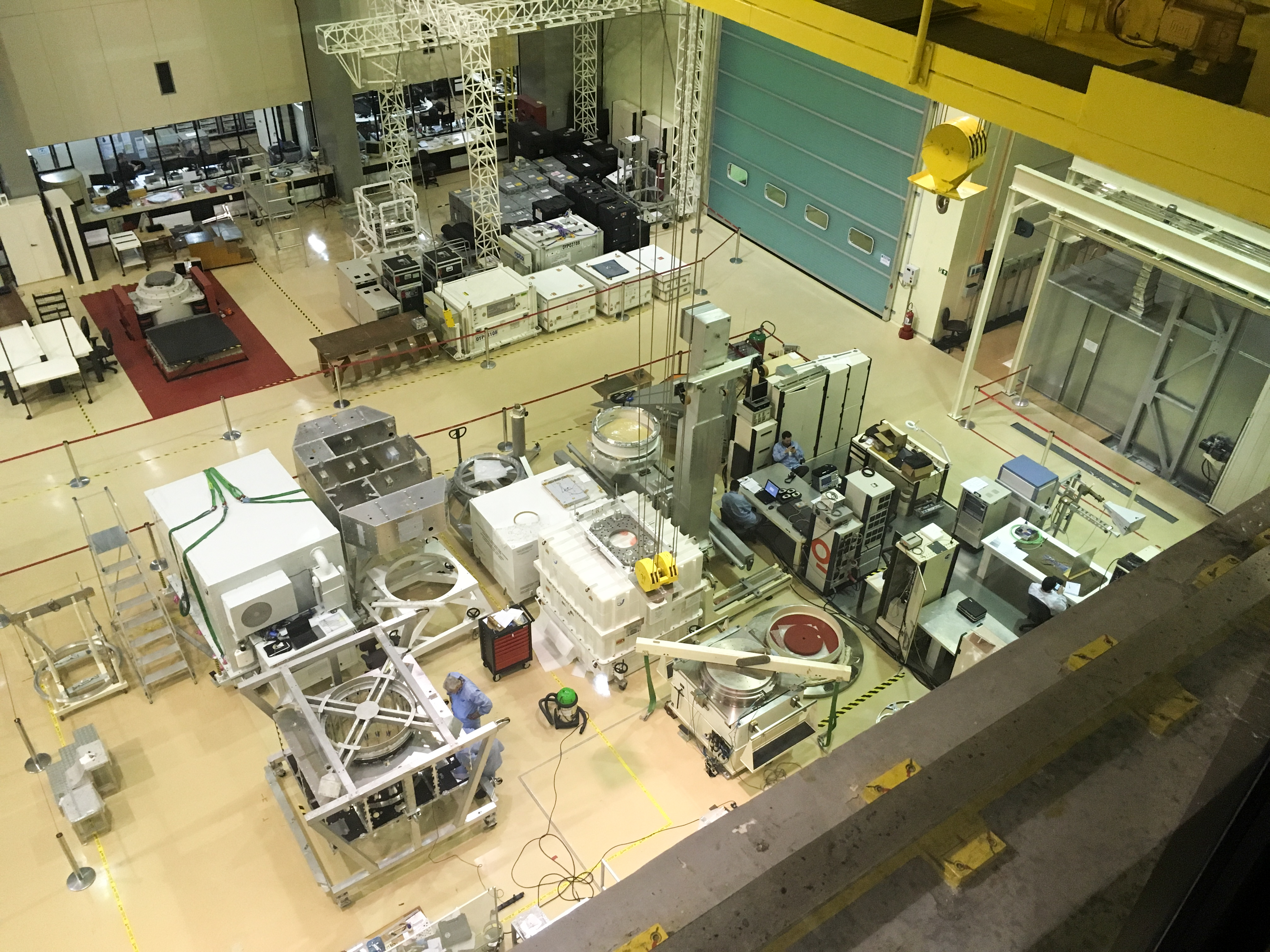
Part of the satellite testing facility at INPE

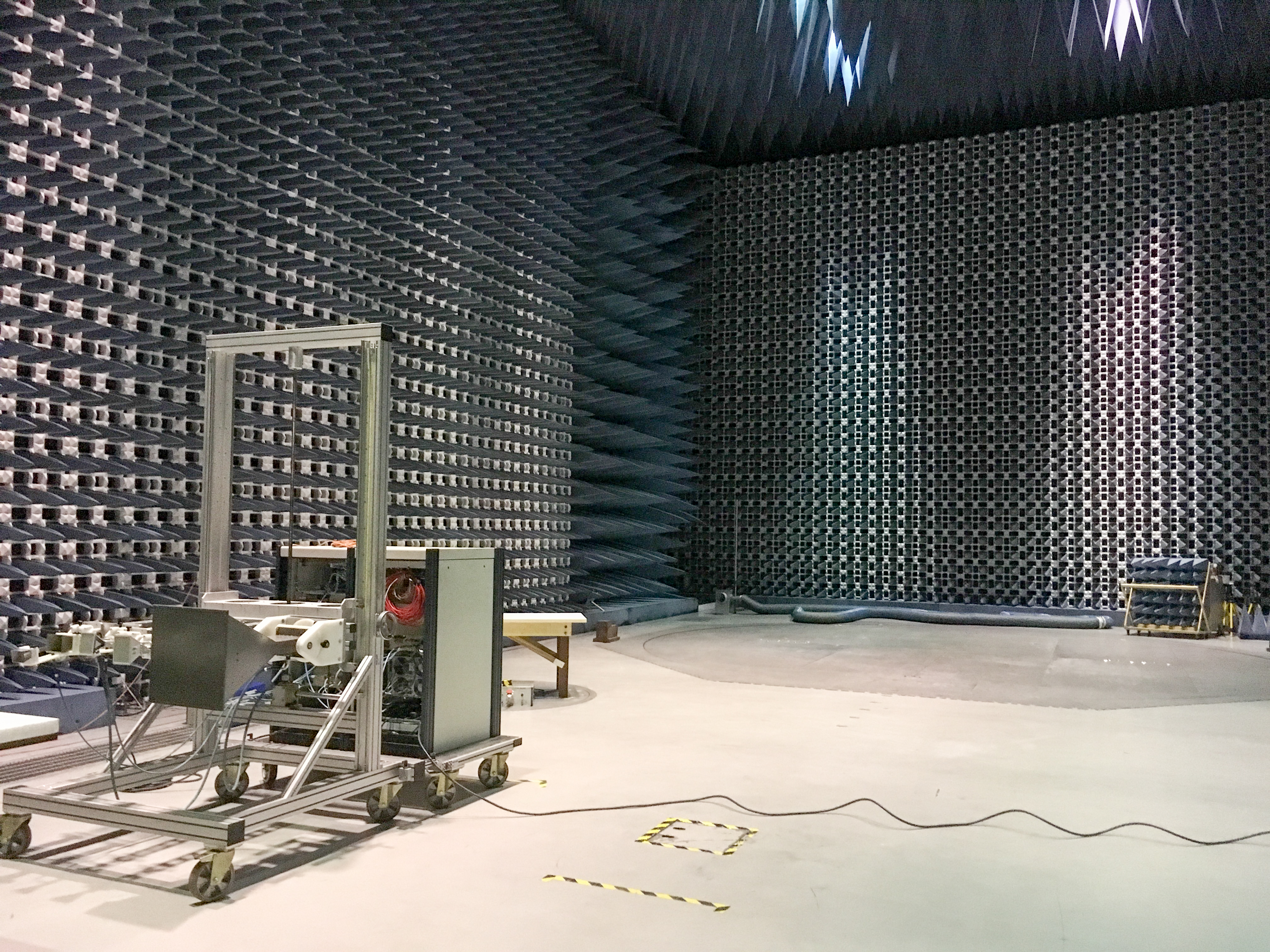
An Anechoic chamber at INPE

The National Institute for Space Research (Portuguese: Instituto Nacional de Pesquisas Espaciais, INPE) is a research unit of the Brazilian Ministry of Science, Technology and Innovations, the main goals of which are fostering scientific research and technological applications and qualifying personnel in the fields of space and atmospheric sciences, space engineering, and space technology. While INPE is the civilian research center for aerospace activities, the Brazilian Air Force's General Command for Aerospace Technology is the military arm. INPE is located in the city of São José dos Campos, São Paulo.

== History ==
On August 13, 1961, President Jânio Quadros signed a decree which created the Organizing Group for the National Commission on Space Activities (COGNAE). This group would give rise to the current National Institute for Space Research. COGNAE, which shortly after became known as CNAE, started its activities by stimulating, coordinating and supporting studies on space related areas, besides breeding a team of skilled researchers and establishing cooperation with leading nations on the space area. On April 22, 1971, the National Institute for Space Research (INPE) was created, subordinated to the National Research Council (CNPq). Its first Director was the electronic engineer Fernando de Mendonça. INPE would be the main civilian executive organ for space research development in accordance with the directives of the Brazilian Commission for Space Activities (COBAE), an advisory organ to the President. Until the mid-Seventies, the main projects carried out by INPE included the usage of meteorological, communications and earth observation satellites. This engendered other projects such as:

- MESA – reception and interpretation of meteorological satellite images
- SERE – use of satellite remote sensing technique and aircraft earth resources monitoring
- SACI – improved the educational system through broadcasting, using a geostationary communications satellite

INPE entered a new era when the Brazilian government approved the Complete Brazilian Space Mission (MECB) at the end of the 1970s. The institute, besides research and applications, started the development of the space technology for specific needs, essential for a country of continental dimensions with immense uninhabited areas. On March 15, 1985, the Ministry of Science and Technology (MCT) was created and INPE became part of it as an independent organ of the Direct Administration. During the 1980s, INPE started developing priority programs such as:

- Complete Brazilian Space Mission (MECB)
- China–Brazil Earth Resources Satellite program (CBERS)
- Amazon Research Program (AMZ)
- Center for Weather Forecast and Climatic Studies (CPTEC)

It also kept track of other countries' research on the space area, facilitating collaboration and partnership with them. During this period it also established its Integration and Tests Laboratory (LIT) which develops highly specialized activities essential to the Brazilian Space Program. In the 1990s, the first Brazilian satellite (SCD-1) was launched. Since 1994, the Brazilian Space Agency has been responsible for Brazil's space program. INPE works in close cooperation with the agency. In 1998, the second Brazilian satellite (SCD-2) was successfully launched, performing even better than the first one. CBERS 1 was launched in 1999, CBERS 2 in 2003 and CBERS 2B in 2007. In August 2019, the chief of the agency, Ricardo Galvão, was fired by science minister Marcos Pontes after a period where Galvão had a public argument with Brazilian president Jair Bolsonaro over the validity of data from DETER, a satellite system monitoring deforestation. Bolsonaro stated that the data had been altered to attack his government and Galvão called him a coward in response.

== Directors ==
#	Director	Period	Note
1	Fernando de Mendonça	1963 - 1976	1st director from INPE.
2	Nelson de Jesus Parada	1976 - 1985	
3	Marco Antonio Raupp	1985 - 1989	
4	Márcio Nogueira Barbosa	1989 - 2001	He left the institute to take up a post at UNESCO.
—	Volker Kirchhoff	2001 - 2001	Interim Director.
5	Luiz Carlos Moura Miranda	2001 - 2005	Assuming post in 2001, resigned on 26 April 2005 after a dispute over funding.
—	Leonel Perondi	2005 - 2005	Interim Director.
6	Gilberto Câmara	2005 - 2012	
7	Leonel Perondi	2012 - 2016	
8	Ricardo Galvão	2016 - 2019	Assuming post in 2016, he was exonerated in 2019 after publicly defending INPE's work against the Jair Bolsonaro government's attacks in the context of Amazon deforestation, specifically during the 2019 fires. Within the internal regulations the replacement occurred due to "a situation of loss of confidence".
—	Darcton Policarpo Damião	2019 - 2020	Interim Director.
9	Clezio Marcos de Nardin	2020 - 2023	In office between 2020 and 2023.
—	Gilvan Sampaio de Oliveira	2023	Interim director.

== See also ==
- Aeronautics Technological Institute (ITA)
- Experimento Tokamak Esférico (ETE)
- Institute of Aeronautics and Space
- Marcos Pontes, the first Brazilian astronaut
- List of Brazilian satellites
