= List of postage stamps of Pakistan from 2017 to present =

This is a list of postage stamps and souvenir sheets issued by Pakistan Post from 2017 to present.

- 1947 to 1966
- 1967 to 1976
- 1977 to 1986
- 1987 to 1996
- 1997 to 2006
- 2007 to 2016
- 2017 to present

== 2017 ==
1. 13th Economic Cooperation Organization (ECO) Summit at Islamabad – 6 March 2017
2. Pakistan, the winner of the ICC Champions Trophy 2017 – 2 November 2017

== 2018 ==
1. 75 years of Army Burn Hall College, Abbottabad (1943–2018) – 5 March 2018
2. The 10th Edition of International Defence Exhibition and Seminar (IDEAS) 2018 by Defence Export Promotion Organization – 27 November 2018

== 2019 ==
1. Launch of Pakistan's First Remote Sensing Satellites PRSS-1 and PakTES-1A – 9 July 2019

== 2020 ==
1. Kashmir Solidarity Day – 5 February 2020
2. High-Level International Conference in Islamabad on 17–18 February 2020; 40 Years of Presence of Afghan Refugees in Pakistan – 17 February 2020
