= List of postage stamps of Pakistan from 1997 to 2006 =

Pakistan has, over its 60-year history, issued over 600 issues and 1,100 stamps and souvenir sheets.

== 1997 ==
No.	Stamp	Issue or subject	Issue details	Date of issue
1		Poets of Pakistan: 86th birth anniversary of Faiz Ahmad Faiz	—	February 13, 1997
2		Special Summit of the Organisation of Islamic Cooperation, Islamabad	—	March 23, 1997
3		660th Jubilee of Amir Temur	—	April 8, 1997
4		Great Poets of Pakistan and Iran: Allama Muhammad Iqbal and Jalal-ud-Din Rumi	—	April 21, 1997
5		Fruits of Pakistan: Apple	—	May 8, 1997
6		Birth of Abdullah Malik	—	June 4, 1997
7		World Population Day	—	July 11, 1997
8		40 years of IAEA–PACE cooperation	—	—
9		Golden Jubilee of Pakistan	—	August 14, 1997
10		Pioneers of Pakistan	—	1997
11		75th anniversary of Lahore College for Women	—	—
12		Medicinal Plants of Pakistan: lashsan (garlic)	—	October 22, 1997
13		Wildlife Series	—	October 29, 1997
14		Protect Our Earth: Save the ozone layer	—	November 15, 1997
15		Pakistan Motorway Project: Lahore–Islamabad section	—	November 25, 1997
16		International Day of Persons with Disabilities	—	December 3, 1997
17		150th anniversary of Karachi Grammar School	—	December 30, 1997

== 1998 ==
No.	Stamp	Issue or subject	Issue details	Date of issue
1		Death anniversary of Mirza Ghalib	—	February 15, 1998
2		Defence Services of Pakistan celebrations	—	March 23, 1998
3		Death centenary of Sir Syed Ahmad Khan	—	March 27, 1998
4		27th National Games, Peshawar	—	April 22, 1998
5		Medicinal Plants of Pakistan: Dhatura	—	April 27, 1998
6		Silver Jubilee of the Senate of Pakistan	—	August 6, 1998
7		Centenary of Government College, Faisalabad	—	August 14, 1998
8		17th Definitive Series	—	August 14, 1998
9		Ophthalmological Congress	—	September 11, 1998
10		50th death anniversary of Quaid-e-Azam Muhammad Ali Jinnah	—	September 11, 1998
11		Birth centenary of Patras Bokhari	—	October 1, 1998
12		Fifty years of philately in Pakistan	—	October 4, 1998
13		World Food Day: Women Feed the World	—	October 16, 1998
14		Scientists of Pakistan Series: Professor Abdus Salam	—	November 21, 1998
15		Pakistan 2010 Programme	—	November 27, 1998
16		50th anniversary of the Universal Declaration of Human Rights	—	December 10, 1998
17		50 years of UNICEF in Pakistan	—	December 11, 1998
18		International Year of the Ocean	—	December 15, 1998
19		Qaumi Parcham March	—	December 16, 1998

== 1999 ==
Thirty-five stamps and two souvenir sheets were issued in 1999.

No.	Stamp	Issue or subject	Issue details	Date of issue
1		International Conference on 100 Years of the Kingdom of Saudi Arabia	2 stamps (Rs. 2 and Rs. 15) and 1 souvenir sheet (Rs. 20) containing a perforated Rs. 15 stamp	January 27, 1999
2		Professor Salimuzzaman Siddiqui	1 stamp (Rs. 5)	April 14, 1999
3		Yaum-e-Takbeer: Pakistan’s quest for self-reliance	1 stamp (Rs. 5)	May 28, 1999
4		Data Durbar Complex, Lahore	1 stamp (Rs. 7)	May 31, 1999
5		Archaeological Heritage of Pakistan: Fasting Buddha	2 stamps (Rs. 7 each) and 1 souvenir sheet (Rs. 25)	July 21, 1999
6		50th anniversary of the Geneva Conventions	1 stamp (Rs. 5)	August 12, 1999
7		Pioneers of Freedom: Chaudhry Muhammad Ali, Sir Adamjee Dawood and Maulana Abdul Hameed Badayuni	3 stamps (Rs. 2 each)	August 14, 1999
8		Second death anniversary of Ustad Nusrat Fateh Ali Khan	1 stamp (Rs. 2)	August 16, 1999
9		Islamic Development Bank	1 stamp (Rs. 5)	September 18, 1999
10		Golden Jubilee of the founding of the People’s Republic of China	2 stamps (Rs. 2 and Rs. 15)	September 21, 1999
11		9th Asian Sailing Championship	5 stamps (Rs. 2 each)	September 28, 1999
12		10th Asian Optimist Sailing Championship	1 stamp (Rs. 2)	October 7, 1999
13		125th anniversary of the Universal Postal Union	1 stamp (Rs. 10)	October 7, 1999
14		First anniversary of the assassination of Hakim Muhammad Said	1 stamp (Rs. 5)	October 17, 1999
15		Golden Jubilee of the National Bank of Pakistan	1 stamp (Rs. 5)	November 8, 1999
16		100 years of Shell in Pakistan	1 stamp (Rs. 4)	November 15, 1999
17		Decade of the Convention on the Rights of the Child	1 stamp (Rs. 2)	November 20, 1999
18		25 years of Allama Iqbal Open University, Islamabad	3 stamps (Rs. 2, Rs. 3 and Rs. 5)	November 20, 1999
19		Birth centenary of Shabbir Hassan Khan Josh Malihabadi — Poets of Pakistan Series	1 stamp (Rs. 5)	December 5, 1999
20		Professor Afzal Qadri — Scientists of Pakistan Series	1 stamp (Rs. 5)	December 6, 1999
21		Ghulam Farid Aleg — Men of Letters Series	1 stamp (Rs. 5)	December 10, 1999
22		Ispaghol — Medicinal Plants of Pakistan Series	1 stamp (Rs. 5)	December 20, 1999
23		Eid ul-Fitr	2 stamps (Rs. 2 and Rs. 15)	December 24, 1999

== 2000 ==
Twenty-four stamps were issued on sixteen occasions in 2000.

No.	Stamp	Issue or subject	Issue details	Date of issue
1		25th anniversary of SOS Children’s Villages of Pakistan	1 stamp (Rs. 2)	March 12, 2000
2		Centenary of the International Cycling Union	1 stamp (Rs. 2)	April 14, 2000
3		Convention on Human Rights and Human Dignity	1 stamp (Rs. 2)	April 21, 2000
4		Centenary of Edwardes College, Peshawar	1 stamp (Rs. 2)	April 24, 2000
5		Birth anniversary of Muhammad Ali Habib	1 stamp (Rs. 2)	April 21, 2000
6		30 years of the Institute of Cost and Management Accountants of Pakistan	2 stamps (Rs. 2 and Rs. 15)	June 23, 2000
7		Ahmed E. H. Jaffer	1 stamp (Rs. 10)	August 9, 2000
8		Sarfroshan-e-Tehreek-e-Pakistan	4 stamps (Rs. 5 each)	August 9, 2000
9		Nishan-e-Haider: Major Tufail Mohammad and Captain Raja Muhammad Sarwar	2 stamps (Rs. 5 each)	September 6, 2000
10		XXVII Olympic Games, Sydney 2000	4 stamps (Rs. 4 each)	September 20, 2000
11		125 years of excellence, 1875–2000: National College of Arts, Lahore	1 stamp (Rs. 5)	October 28, 2000
12		Creating the Future Conference	1 stamp (Rs. 5)	November 4, 2000
13		International Defence Exhibition and Seminar — IDEAS 2000	1 stamp (Rs. 7)	November 14, 2000
14		Medicinal Plants of Pakistan: Liquorice (Mulathi)	1 stamp (Rs. 2)	November 28, 2000
15		A World Without Polio	1 stamp (Rs. 2)	December 13, 2000
16		50th anniversary of the UNHCR	1 stamp (Rs. 2)	December 14, 2000

== 2001 ==
Thirty-three stamps were issued on twenty occasions in 2001.

No.	Stamp	Issue or subject	Issue details	Date of issue
1		Abu Al-Asar Hafeez Jalandhari	1 stamp (Rs. 2)	January 14, 2001
2		Habib Bank AG Zurich	1 stamp (Rs. 5)	March 20, 2001
3		Chashma Nuclear Power Plant	1 stamp (Rs. 2)	March 29, 2001
4		9th SAF Games	2 stamps (Rs. 4 each)	April 9, 2001
5		50th anniversary of Pakistan–China friendship	3 stamps (Rs. 4 each)	May 12, 2001
6		2001 as the Year of Quaid-e-Azam Muhammad Ali Jinnah	1 stamp (Rs. 4)	August 14, 2001
7		Nishan-e-Haider: Major Shabbir Sharif and Major Muhammad Akram	2 stamps (Rs. 4 each)	September 6, 2001
8		Festival 2001	1 stamp (Rs. 4)	September 22, 2001
9		Khawaja Ghulam Farid — Poets of Pakistan Series	1 stamp (Rs. 5)	September 25, 2001
10		United Nations Year of Dialogue among Civilizations	1 stamp (Rs. 4)	October 9, 2001
11		Imtiaz Ali Taj — Men of Letters Series	1 stamp (Rs. 5)	October 13, 2001
12		Tenth anniversary of the independence of Turkmenistan	1 stamp (Rs. 5)	October 17, 2001
13		Medicinal Plants of Pakistan: Peppermint	1 stamp (Rs. 4)	November 12, 2001
14		125 years of the Convent of Jesus and Mary, Lahore	1 stamp (Rs. 4)	November 15, 2001
15		Professor Ishtiaq Hussain Qureshi — Men of Letters Series	1 stamp (Rs. 4)	November 20, 2001
16		Wildlife Series: Birds	4 stamps (Rs. 4 each)	November 20, 2001
17		30th anniversary of Pakistan–United Arab Emirates diplomatic relations	2 stamps (Rs. 5 and Rs. 30)	December 2, 2001
18		Golden Jubilee of Nishtar Medical College, 1951–2001	2 stamps (Rs. 5 and Rs. 30)	December 2, 2001
19		2001 as the Year of Quaid-e-Azam Muhammad Ali Jinnah	5 stamps (Rs. 4 each)	December 25, 2001
20		Golden Jubilee of Pakistan Ordnance Factories, Wah	2 stamps (Rs. 4 each)	December 28, 2001

== 2002 ==
Twenty-one stamps were issued on twelve occasions in 2002.

No.	Stamp	Issue or subject	Issue details	Date of issue
1		Samandar Khan Samandar — Poets of Pakistan Series	1 stamp (Rs. 5)	January 17, 2002
2		Medicinal Plants of Pakistan: Hyssop	1 stamp (Rs. 5)	February 15, 2002
3		50th anniversary of Pakistan–Japan relations	1 stamp (Rs. 5)	April 28, 2002
4		Tenth anniversary of Pakistan–Kyrgyzstan relations	1 stamp (Rs. 5)	May 27, 2002
5		Fruits of Pakistan: Mango	4 stamps (Rs. 4 each)	June 18, 2002
6		55th Independence Day celebrations	4 stamps (Rs. 4 each)	August 14, 2002
7		World Summit on Sustainable Development, Johannesburg	2 stamps (Rs. 4 each)	August 26, 2002
8		Muhammad Ali Rangoonwala	1 stamp (Rs. 4)	August 31, 2002
9		Nishan-e-Haider: Lance Naik Muhammad Mahfuz and Sawar Muhammad Hussain Janjua	2 stamps (Rs. 4 each)	September 6, 2002
10		2002 as the Year of Allama Muhammad Iqbal	2 stamps (Rs. 4 each)	November 9, 2002
11	Pakistan Eid al-Fitr postage stamp issued in 2002	Eid Mubarak	1 stamp (Rs. 4)	November 14, 2002
12		Shifa-ul-Mulk Hakim Muhammad Hassan Qarshi	1 stamp (Rs. 4)	December 20, 2002

== 2003 ==
Forty-six stamps were issued on twenty-two occasions in 2003.

No.	Stamp	Issue or subject	Issue details	Date of issue
1		National Philatelic Exhibition — Pakistan 2003	1 stamp (Rs. 4)	January 31, 2003
2		Golden Jubilee of the Pakistan Academy of Sciences, Islamabad	1 stamp (Rs. 4)	February 15, 2003
3		Centenary celebrations of the North-West Frontier Province	1 stamp (Rs. 4)	March 23, 2003
4		Golden Jubilee of the PCSIR, Islamabad	1 stamp (Rs. 4)	March 31, 2003
5		Professor A. B. A. Haleem	1 stamp (Rs. 2)	April 20, 2003
6		Creating Awareness Against Drug Abuse	1 stamp (Rs. 2)	April 21, 2003
7		Sir Syed Memorial Society, Islamabad	1 stamp (Rs. 2)	April 30, 2003
8		Medicinal Plants of Pakistan: Rose	1 stamp (Rs. 2)	July 14, 2003
9		Year of Mohtarma Fatima Jinnah	1 stamp (Rs. 4)	July 31, 2003
10		The Silent Servers of Pakistan Post	2 stamps (Rs. 2 each)	August 3, 2003
11		56th Independence Day: Tehreek-e-Pakistan ke Mujahid	3 stamps (Rs. 2 each)	August 14, 2003
12		United Nations Literacy Decade: Education for All	1 stamp (Rs. 1)	September 6, 2003
13		Pilot Officer Rashid Minhas — Nishan-e-Haider	1 stamp (Rs. 2)	September 7, 2003
14		Pakistan Academy of Letters, Islamabad	1 stamp (Rs. 2)	September 24, 2003
15		25th anniversary of the Karakoram Highway	1 stamp (Rs. 2)	October 1, 2003
16		Golden Jubilee of the first ascent of Nanga Parbat	1 stamp (Rs. 2)	October 6, 2003
17		Golden Jubilee of PAF Public School, Sargodha	1 stamp (Rs. 4)	October 10, 2003
18		US$10 billion exports target, 2002–2003	20 stamps (Rs. 1 each)	October 20, 2003
19		International Day of Persons with Disabilities	1 stamp (Rs. 2)	December 3, 2003
20		World Summit on the Information Society	1 stamp (Rs. 2)	December 10, 2003
21		A Brief History of Submarine Construction in Pakistan	2 stamps (Rs. 1 and Rs. 2)	December 12, 2003
22		100th anniversary of powered flight, 1903–2003	2 stamps (Rs. 2 each)	December 17, 2003

== 2004 ==
Fifty-one stamps and two miniature sheets were issued on twenty occasions in 2004.

No.	Stamp	Issue or subject	Issue details	Date of issue
1		SAARC Summit, Islamabad	1 stamp (Rs. 4)	January 12, 2004
2		Golden Jubilee of Sadiq Public School, Bahawalpur	1 stamp (Rs. 4)	January 28, 2004
3		9th SAF Games, Islamabad	12 stamps (Rs. 2 each)	March 29, 2004
4		Justice Pir Muhammad Karam Shah Al-Azhar, 1918–1998	1 stamp (Rs. 2)	April 7, 2004
5		Golden Jubilee of Cadet College Hasan Abdal	1 stamp (Rs. 4)	April 8, 2004
6		Central Library, Bahawalpur	1 stamp (Rs. 2)	April 26, 2004
7		Bhong Mosque, Rahim Yar Khan	1 stamp (Rs. 4)	May 12, 2004
8		Centenary of FIFA	3 stamps (Rs. 5 each)	May 21, 2004
9		Our Cultural Assets: Silk Route	2 stamps (Rs. 4 each)	June 7, 2004
10		Golden Jubilee of Sui Southern Gas Company	1 stamp (Rs. 4)	July 24, 2004
11		Golden Jubilee of the first ascent of K2	1 stamp (Rs. 5) and 1 miniature sheet (Rs. 30)	July 31, 2004
12		XXVIII Olympic Games, Athens 2004	4 stamps (Rs. 5 each)	August 13, 2004
13		57th Independence Anniversary of Pakistan	4 stamps (Rs. 5 each)	August 14, 2004
14		Maulvi Abdul Haq — Men of Letters Series	1 stamp (Rs. 4)	August 16, 2004
15		4th International Calligraphy and Calligraph Art Exhibition and Competition — Pakistan 2004	1 stamp (Rs. 5)	October 1, 2004
16		Popular Aquarium Varieties of Tropical Fish	5 stamps (Rs. 2 each)	October 9, 2004
17		50th anniversary of Japan’s assistance for economic development and disease eradication	4 stamps (Rs. 5 each) and 1 miniature sheet	November 8, 2004
18		Year of Child Rights 2004	1 stamp (Rs. 4)	November 20, 2004
19		30 years of Allama Iqbal Open University, Islamabad	1 stamp (Rs. 20)	December 6, 2004
20		Golden Jubilee of Khyber Medical College, Peshawar, 1954–2004	1 stamp (Rs. 20)	December 20, 2004

== 2005 ==
Thirty-three stamps and one souvenir sheet were issued on nineteen occasions in 2005.

No.	Stamp	Issue or subject	Issue details	Date of issue
1		Allama Iqbal and Mihai Eminescu: Dialogue Between Civilizations	2 stamps (Rs. 5 each)	January 14, 2005
2		Professor Ahmed Ali, 1910–1994	1 stamp (Rs. 5)	January 14, 2005
3		Saadat Hasan Manto, 1912–1955 — Men of Letters Series	1 stamp (Rs. 5)	January 18, 2005
4		Pakistan Air Force: Breaking the Barriers	4 stamps (Rs. 5 each)	March 23, 2005
5		Centenary of the Command and Staff College Quetta	1 stamp (Rs. 5)	April 2, 2005
6		85th anniversary of the Grand National Assembly of Turkey	2 stamps (Rs. 10 each)	April 23, 2005
7		IBA: 50 Years of Excellence, 1955–2005	2 stamps (Rs. 3 each)	April 30, 2005
8		Islamia High School, Quetta	1 stamp (Rs. 5)	May 25, 2005
9		Akhtar Sheerani	1 stamp (Rs. 5)	June 30, 2005
10		Second phase of the World Summit on the Information Society	1 stamp (Rs. 5)	July 15, 2005
11		Rahman Baba — Poets of Pakistan Series	1 stamp (Rs. 5)	August 4, 2005
12		Lahore Marathon 2005	1 stamp (Rs. 5)	September 10, 2005
13		Mushrooms	10 stamps (Rs. 5 each)	October 1, 2005
14		Help Earthquake Victims	1 souvenir sheet containing 8 stamps (Rs. 4 each); additional values stated as Rs. 100 and Rs. 5	October 27, 2005
15		International Year of Sport and Physical Education	1 stamp (Rs. 5)	November 5, 2005
16		Two decades of SAARC	1 stamp (Rs. 5)	November 12, 2005
17		Khawaja Sarwar Hasan, 1902–1973 — Men of Letters Series	1 stamp (Rs. 5)	November 18, 2005
18		SOS Children’s Villages of Pakistan	1 stamp (Rs. 5)	November 20, 2005
19		World Men’s Team Squash Championship, Islamabad	1 stamp (Rs. 5)	December 8, 2005

== 2006 ==
Thirty-five stamps were issued on thirteen occasions in 2006.

No.	Stamp	Issue or subject	Issue details	Date of issue
1		Golden Jubilee of the Supreme Court of Pakistan, 1956–2006	2 stamps (Rs. 4 and Rs. 15)	March 23, 2006
2		Quaid-i-Azam Muhammad Ali Jinnah's visit to the Armoured Corps Centre	2 stamps (Rs. 5 each)	April 14, 2006
3		Birth centenary of Begum Ra'ana Liaquat Ali Khan	1 stamp (Rs. 5)	June 13, 2006
4		400th anniversary of Sri Guru Arjan Dev Ji	1 stamp (Rs. 5)	June 16, 2006
5		Shandur Polo Festival, Chitral	1 stamp (Rs. 5)	July 1, 2006
6		Promotion of Tourism in Pakistan: Lake Series	4 stamps (Rs. 5 each)	July 20, 2006
7		Painters of Pakistan Series	10 stamps (Rs. 4 each)	August 14, 2006
8		Centenary of Hamdard Services	1 stamp (Rs. 5)	August 25, 2006
9		First anniversary of the earthquake of 8 October 2005	1 stamp (Rs. 5)	October 8, 2006
10		Medicinal Plants of Pakistan: Chamomile and Aloe vera	2 stamps (Rs. 5 each)	October 30, 2006
11		International Anti-Corruption Day	1 stamp (Rs. 5)	December 9, 2006
12		Ten years of the Baltit Fort Heritage Trust	1 stamp (Rs. 15)	December 20, 2006
13		Centenary of the Muslim League, 1906–2006	8 stamps (Rs. 4 each)	December 30, 2006

== See also ==
- 1947 to 1966
- 1967 to 1976
- 1977 to 1986
- 1987 to 1996
- 2007 to 2016
- 2017 to present
