= List of postage stamps of Pakistan from 1987 to 1996 =

This is a list of postage stamps and souvenir sheets issued by Pakistan Post from 1987 to 1996.

- 1947 to 1966
- 1967 to 1976
- 1977 to 1986
- 1987 to 1996
- 1997 to 2006
- 2007 to 2016
- 2017 to present

== 1987 ==
Thirty stamps and two labels were issued on fourteen occasions in 1987.

No.	Stamp	Issue or subject	Issue details	Date of issue
1		125th anniversary of St. Patrick's School, Karachi	1 stamp (Rs. 5)	January 29, 1987
2		Savings Bank Week	4 stamps (Rs. 5 each) and 2 labels, issued in a se-tenant strip of six throughout the sheet	February 21, 1987
3		New Parliament House	1 stamp (Rs. 3)	March 23, 1987
4		Drug-Free Society: Preventive Education Against Drug Abuse	1 stamp (Rs. 1)	June 30, 1987
5		Independence Day	2 stamps (80 paisa and Rs. 3)	August 14, 1987
6		Air Force Day	10 stamps (Rs. 3 each), issued in a se-tenant strip of ten in a sheetlet	September 7, 1987
7		Pakistan Tourism Convention	4 stamps (Rs. 1.50 each), issued in a se-tenant block of four throughout the sheet	October 1, 1987
8		Hazrat Shah Abdul Latif Bhittai	1 stamp (80 paisa)	October 8, 1987
9		Centenary of D. J. Sindh Government Science College, Karachi	1 stamp (80 paisa)	November 7, 1987
10		Silver Jubilee Conference of the College of Physicians and Surgeons Pakistan	1 stamp (Rs. 1)	December 9, 1987
11		International Year of Shelter for the Homeless	1 stamp (Rs. 3)	December 15, 1987
12		Centenary of Cathedral Church	1 stamp (Rs. 3)	December 20, 1987
13		40 years of Pakistan Post Office	1 stamp (Rs. 3)	December 28, 1987
14		Radio Pakistan: New Concept of Broadcasting	1 stamp (80 paisa)	December 31, 1987

== 1988 ==
No.	Stamp	Issue or subject	Issue details	Date of issue
1		Birth centenary of Jamshed Nusserwanjee Mehta	—	January 7, 1988
2		World Leprosy Day	—	January 31, 1988
3		40th anniversary of the World Health Organization	—	April 7, 1988
4		125th anniversary of the Red Crescent Movement	—	May 8, 1988
5		Independence Day	—	August 14, 1988
6		Seoul Olympics	—	September 17, 1988
7		Wildlife Series	—	October 29, 1988
8		75th anniversary of Islamia College, Peshawar	—	—
9		SAARC Summit 1988	—	December 29, 1988

== 1989 ==
No.	Stamp	Issue or subject	Issue details	Date of issue
1		16th Asian Advertising Congress — ADASIA 89	—	January 18, 1989
2		Maulana Hasrat Mohani — Pioneers of Freedom Series	—	January 23, 1989
3		Tenth death anniversary of Zulfikar Ali Bhutto	—	April 4, 1989
4		25 years of submarine service	—	June 1, 1989
5		Bicentenary of the French Revolution	—	June 24, 1989
6		Archaeological Heritage of Pakistan	—	June 29, 1989
7		Tenth anniversary of APT	—	July 1, 1989
8		Foundation-stone laying of the first integrated container terminal, Port Qasim	—	August 5, 1989
9		Quaid-e-Azam Mohammad Ali Jinnah — Definitive Series	—	August 14, 1989
10		300th birth anniversary of Shah Abdul Latif Bhittai	—	September 16, 1989
11		Wildlife Series: Himalayan black bear	—	October 7, 1989
12		World Food Day	—	October 16, 1989
13		4th SAF Games, Islamabad	—	October 20, 1989
14		800th birth anniversary of Baba Farid	—	October 20, 1989
15		Silver Jubilee of PTV	—	November 26, 1989
16		SAARC Year Against Narcotics	—	December 8, 1989
17		100th anniversary of Murray College	—	December 18, 1989
18		125th anniversary of Government College Lahore	—	December 21, 1989
19		Tenth anniversary of CIRDAP	—	December 31, 1989

== 1990 ==
No.	Stamp	Issue or subject	Issue details	Date of issue
1		20th anniversary of the OIC	—	February 9, 1990
2		7th Hockey World Cup	—	February 12, 1990
3		Golden Jubilee of the Pakistan Resolution	—	March 23, 1990
4		Safe Motherhood South Asia Conference	—	March 24, 1990
5		Painters of Pakistan Series: Shakir Ali	—	April 19, 1990
6		Pakistan's first experimental satellite, Badr-1	—	July 26, 1990
7		Independence Day: Pioneers of Freedom Series	—	August 14, 1990
8		IPE commemoration	—	August 19, 1990
9		International Literacy Year	—	September 8, 1990
10		Joint meeting of the RCPE and CPSP	—	September 22, 1990
11		World Summit for Children	—	September 29, 1990
12		SAARC Year of the Girl Child	—	November 21, 1990
13		Silver Jubilee of the Security Printing Press	—	December 8, 1990

== 1991 ==
No.	Stamp	Issue or subject	Issue details	Date of issue
1		International Civil Defence Day	—	March 1, 1991
2		South and West Asia Postal Union commemoration	—	March 12, 1991
3		World Population Day	—	July 11, 1991
4		Special Olympics International	—	July 19, 1991
5		Pioneers of Freedom	—	August 14, 1991
6		Golden Jubilee of Habib Bank Limited	—	August 25, 1991
7		St. Joseph's Convent School	—	September 8, 1991
8		Emperor Sher Shah Suri	—	October 5, 1991
9		Pakistan Scientific Expedition to Antarctica	—	—
10		Wildlife Series	—	November 4, 1991
11		25 years of the Asian Development Bank	—	December 19, 1991
12		300th anniversary of Hazrat Sultan Bahu	—	December 22, 1991
13		Painters of Pakistan	—	December 24, 1991
14		100th anniversary of American Express travellers' cheques	—	December 26, 1991

== 1992 ==
No.	Stamp	Issue or subject	Issue details	Date of issue
1		Muslim Commercial Bank: First Year of Privatisation	—	April 8, 1992
2		National Seminar on Philately	—	April 15, 1992
3		World Cricket Cup 1992	—	April 27, 1992
4		International Space Year	—	June 7, 1992
5		New Definitive Stamps: Export Series	—	July 5, 1992
6		Population Day	—	July 25, 1992
7		Pioneers of Freedom Series	—	August 14, 1992
8		4th Islamic Scouts Conference and 6th Islamic Scouts Jamboree, Islamabad	—	August 23, 1992
9		Centenary celebrations of Government Islamia College	—	November 1, 1992
10		Medicinal Plants of Pakistan: Banafsha (violet)	—	November 22, 1992
11		Extraordinary session of the ECO Council of Ministers	—	November 28, 1992
12		International Conference on Nutrition	—	December 5, 1992
13		Islamic Cultural Heritage	—	December 14, 1992
14		Wildlife Series: Ducks	—	December 31, 1992

== 1993 ==
No.	Stamp	Issue or subject	Issue details	Date of issue
1		Dresses of Pakistan	—	March 10, 1993
2		21st Conference of Foreign Ministers of Islamic Countries	—	April 25, 1993
3		World Telecommunication Day	—	May 17, 1993
4		Medicinal Plants of Pakistan: Saunf	—	June 21, 1993
5		Pioneers of Freedom	—	August 14, 1993
6		Centenary celebrations of Gordon College, Rawalpindi	—	September 1, 1993
7		Juniper Forest at Ziarat	—	September 30, 1993
8		World Food Day	—	October 16, 1993
9		50th anniversary of Burn Hall Institutions, Abbottabad	—	October 28, 1993
10		South and West Asia Postal Union	—	November 18, 1993
11		Medicinal Congress 1993	—	December 10, 1993
12		117th birth anniversary of Quaid-e-Azam	—	December 25, 1993

== 1994 ==
No.	Stamp	Issue or subject	Issue details	Date of issue
1		75th anniversary of the ILO	—	April 11, 1994
2		Eve of Biodiversity Day	—	April 20, 1994
3		International Year of the Family 1994	—	May 15, 1994
4		World Population Day	—	July 11, 1994
5		Pioneers of Freedom	—	August 14, 1994
6		Indonesia–Pakistan Economic and Cultural Cooperation Organization (IPECC)	—	August 19, 1994
7		International Literacy Day	—	September 8, 1994
8		Quaid-e-Azam Mohammad Ali Jinnah — Definitive Series	—	—
9		2nd SAARC and 12th National Scouts Jamboree, Quetta	—	September 22, 1994
10		First International Festival of Islamic Artisans at Work	—	October 7, 1994
11		Medicinal Plants of Pakistan: Ajwain	—	October 18, 1994
12		Celebration of 1,000 years of the Shahnameh	—	—
13		Centenary of the Lahore Museum	—	December 27, 1994
14		Pakistan — World Cup champions	—	December 31, 1994

== 1995 ==
No.	Stamp	Issue or subject	Issue details	Date of issue
1		20th anniversary of the World Tourism Organization	—	January 2, 1995
2		Juniper Forests	—	February 14, 1995
3		Poets of Pakistan: Khushal Khattak	—	February 28, 1995
4		Third ECO Summit	—	March 14, 1995
5		Wildlife Series — Reptiles of Pakistan: Snakes	—	April 15, 1995
6		Earth Day	—	April 20, 1995
7		Traditional Means of Transport and Communication Series	—	May 22, 1995
8		First Conference of Women Parliamentarians from Muslim Countries	—	August 1, 1995
9		Pioneers of Freedom Series	—	August 14, 1995
10		Wildlife Series: Butterflies	—	September 1, 1995
11		Wildlife Series: Fish	—	September 1, 1995
12		Defence Day — Nishan-e-Haider: Major Aziz Bhatti	—	September 6, 1995
13		Definitive Series	—	September 1995
14		Centenary of Presentation Convent School, Rawalpindi	—	September 8, 1995
15		Fourth World Conference on Women, China	—	September 15, 1995
16		100th death anniversary of Louis Pasteur	—	September 28, 1995
17		Birth centenary of Liaquat Ali Khan, first prime minister of Pakistan	—	October 1, 1995
18		50 years of service to humanity by the United Nations	—	October 16, 1995
19		50th anniversary of the founding of the United Nations	—	October 24, 1995
20		60 years of women's education: Kinnaird College for Women, Lahore	—	November 3, 1995
21		International Conference of Writers and Intellectuals, Islamabad	—	November 30, 1995
22		First decade of SAARC, 1985–1995	—	December 8, 1995
23		National Water Sports Gala, Karachi 1995	—	December 14, 1995
24		20 years of Allama Iqbal Open University	—	December 16, 1995
25		Silver Jubilee of the University of Balochistan, Quetta	—	December 31, 1995

== 1996 ==
No.	Stamp	Issue or subject	Issue details	Date of issue
1		17th martyrdom anniversary of Zulfikar Ali Bhutto	—	April 4, 1996
2		Centennial Olympic Games, Atlanta 1996	—	August 3, 1996
3		Pioneers of Freedom	—	August 14, 1996
4		Restoration of National Heritage	—	August 21, 1996
5		International Literacy Year	—	September 8, 1996
6		Medicinal Plants of Pakistan: Yarrow	—	November 25, 1996
7		Birth of Abubakr Khan Ghalzai	—	December 13, 1996
