= List of postage stamps of Pakistan from 2007 to 2016 =

This is a list of commemorative stamps issued by Pakistan Post between the years 2007 and 2016.

- 1947 to 1966
- 1977 to 1986
- 1977 to 1986
- 1987 to 1996
- 1997 to 2006
- 2007 to 2016
- 2017 to present

== 2007 ==
In 2007 the post office issued 9 commemorative stamps.

- Platinum Jubilee Celebration of K.M.C. Building, Karachi 1932–2007, 1 stamp, ₨ 10, 16 January 2007
- Golden Jubilee of Cadet College Petaro, 1 stamp, ₨ 10, 28 February 2007
- International Women's Day, 1 stamp, ₨ 10, 8 March 2007
- Hugh Catchpole (educationist), 1 stamp, ₨ 10, 26 May 2007
- New Vision of Pakistan Post, 1 stamp, ₨ 4, 7 June 2007
- Pakistan Air Force – Defence Day, 1 stamp, ₨ 5, 6 September 2007
- First Anniversary of 3rd Meeting of the ECO Postal Authorities, 1 stamp, ₨ 5, 22 September 2007
- Completion of 5 Year Term of National Assembly of Pakistan, 1 stamp ₨ 15, 15 November 2007
- Centenary Celebration of Catholic Cathedral Church, Lahore, 1 stamp, ₨ 5, 19 November 2007

== 2008 ==
As per Siddiqui Stamps Catalogue 2014 Edition in 2008 Pakistan Post Office issued 6 Stamps and 3 Souvenir Sheets on 5 occasions.

- 3rd Anniversary of Earthquake – 8 October
- United Nations Human Rights Award 2008 For Mohtarma Benazir Bhutto – 10 December
