= List of postage stamps of Pakistan from 1977 to 1986 =

Pakistan has, over its 60-year history, issued over 600 issues and 1,100 stamps and souvenir sheets.

- 1947 to 1966
- 1967 to 1976
- 1977 to 1986
- 1987 to 1996
- 1997 to 2006
- 2007 to 2016
- 2017 to present

== 1977 ==
No.	Stamp	Issue or subject	Issue details	Date of issue
1		Social Welfare and Rural Development Year	1 stamp (20 paisa)	April 14, 1977
2		13th anniversary of RCD	3 stamps (20, 65 and 90 paisa)	July 21, 1977
3		National Tree Plantation Campaign	1 stamp (20 paisa)	August 9, 1977
4		United Nations Conference on Desertification	1 stamp (65 paisa)	September 5, 1977
5		Universal Children's Day	1 stamp (50 paisa)	October 3, 1977
6		Birth centenary of Aga Khan III	1 stamp (Rs. 2)	November 2, 1977
7		Iqbal Centenary 1977	5 stamps (20 and 65 paisa; Rs. 1.25, Rs. 2.25 and Rs. 3), issued in a horizontal se-tenant strip	November 9, 1977
8		Hajj 1977/1397 AH	1 stamp (65 paisa)	November 21, 1977
9		World Rheumatism Year	1 stamp (65 paisa)	December 19, 1977

== 1978 ==
No.	Stamp	Issue or subject	Issue details	Date of issue
1		IPECC commemoration	1 stamp (75 paisa)	February 9, 1978
2		World Hypertension Month	2 stamps (20 paisa and Rs. 2)	April 20, 1978
3		Henry Dunant commemoration	1 stamp (Rs. 1)	May 8, 1978
4		14th anniversary of RCD	3 stamps (20 and 90 paisa; Rs. 2), issued in a horizontal strip; joint issue with Iran and Turkey	July 21, 1978
5		30th anniversary of Riccione	2 stamps (Rs. 1 and Rs. 2)	August 26, 1978
6		United Nations Conference on Technical Cooperation among Developing Countries	1 stamp (75 paisa)	September 3, 1978
7		Centenary of St. Patrick's Cathedral, Karachi	2 stamps (Rs. 1 and Rs. 2)	September 29, 1978
8		Definitive Series	18 stamps: Minar-e-Pakistan (2, 3 and 5 paisa); tractor (10, 20, 25, 40, 50, 60 and 90 paisa; 75 paisa Dies I and II); Makli tombs (Rs. 1, Rs. 1.50, Rs. 2, Rs. 3, Rs. 4 and Rs. 5). Issued with Arabic gum and PVA gum	1978–1980
9		International Anti-Apartheid Year	1 stamp (Rs. 1)	November 20, 1978
10		Birth centenary of Maulana Muhammad Ali Jauhar	1 stamp (50 paisa)	December 10, 1978
11		75th anniversary of the first powered flight	4 stamps (65 paisa; Rs. 1, Rs. 2 and Rs. 2.25)	December 24, 1978

== 1979 ==
No.	Stamp	Issue or subject	Issue details	Date of issue
1		12th Rabi' al-Awwal 1399 AH commemoration	1 stamp (20 paisa)	February 10, 1979
2		30 years of the APWA	1 stamp (50 paisa)	February 25, 1979
3		Pioneers of Freedom	3 stamps (Rs. 10, Rs. 15 and Rs. 25), initially printed in a horizontal se-tenant strip of three; separate sheets of each value were later issued	March 23, 1979
4		Wildlife Series	4 stamps (20, 25 and 40 paisa; Rs. 1)	June 17, 1979
5		15th anniversary of RCD	3 stamps (40 and 75 paisa; Rs. 1.60), printed in a vertical se-tenant strip of three throughout the sheet	July 21, 1979
6		Pakistan Handicraft Series	4 stamps (40 paisa; Rs. 1, Rs. 1.50 and Rs. 2), printed in a se-tenant block of four throughout the sheet	August 23, 1979
7		SOS Children's Villages	4 stamps (40 and 75 paisa; Rs. 1 and Rs. 1.50) and 1 souvenir sheet (Rs. 2); stamps printed in a se-tenant block of four throughout the sheet	September 10, 1979
8		International Year of the Child	1 stamp (50 paisa)	October 22, 1979
9		Fight against cancer	1 stamp (40 paisa)	November 12, 1979
10		Customs Centenary	1 stamp (Rs. 1)	December 10, 1979

== 1980 ==
No.	Stamp	Issue or subject	Issue details	Date of issue
1		25 years of PIA services	1 stamp (Rs. 1)	January 10, 1980
2		Special Regular Series	7 stamps (10, 15, 25, 35, 40, 50 and 80 paisa), printed by Secura Press, Singapore	12 January–13 March 1980
3		Fifth Asian Congress of Paediatric Surgery, Karachi	1 stamp (50 paisa)	February 16, 1980
4		11th Islamic Conference of Foreign Ministers, Islamabad	1 stamp (Rs. 1)	May 17, 1980
5		100 years of Karachi Port management	1 stamp (Rs. 1)	July 15, 1980
6		Riccione	4 stamps (40 and 75 paisa; Rs. 1 and Rs. 1.50), printed in a se-tenant block of four throughout the sheet	August 30, 1980
7		75 years of the Command and Staff College Quetta	1 stamp (Rs. 1)	September 18, 1980
8		World Tourism Conference	1 stamp (Rs. 1), overprinted “World Tourism Conference Manila 80”	September 27, 1980
9		Birth centenary of Hafiz Mahmud Sherani	1 stamp (40 paisa)	October 5, 1980
10		Aga Khan Award for Architecture	1 stamp (Rs. 2)	October 23, 1980
11		1400th anniversary of the Hijra	3 stamps (40 paisa; Rs. 2 and Rs. 3) and 1 souvenir sheet (Rs. 4)	November 10, 1980
12		100 years of money order service	1 stamp (40 paisa)	December 20, 1980
13		100 years of postcard service	1 stamp (40 paisa)	December 27, 1980

== 1981 ==
No.	Stamp	Issue or subject	Issue details	Date of issue
1		150th birth anniversary of Heinrich von Stephan	1 stamp (Rs. 1)	January 7, 1981
2		50 years of airmail service	1 stamp (Rs. 1)	February 15, 1981
3		1400th anniversary of the Hijra	1 stamp (40 paisa)	March 7, 1981
4		Third Islamic Summit Conference at Mecca — first series	5 stamps (two at 40 paisa, two at Rs. 1 and one at Rs. 2)	March 29, 1981
5		Third Islamic Summit Conference at Mecca — second series	4 stamps (two at 40 paisa and two at 85 paisa)	April 20, 1981
6		Birth centenary of Mustafa Kemal Atatürk	1 stamp (Rs. 1)	May 19, 1981
7		Wildlife Series	1 stamp (40 paisa)	June 20, 1981
8		Palestine	1 stamp (Rs. 2)	July 25, 1981
9		Mountain Peaks of Pakistan	8 stamps (two at 40 paisa, two at Rs. 1, two at Rs. 1.50 and two at Rs. 2)	August 20, 1981
10		Inauguration of Furnace No. 1, Pakistan Steel Mills	2 stamps (40 paisa and Rs. 2)	August 31, 1981
11		Wildlife Series	2 stamps (40 paisa and Rs. 2)	September 15, 1981
12		International Year of Disabled Persons	2 stamps (40 paisa and Rs. 2)	December 12, 1981

== 1982 ==
No.	Stamp	Issue or subject	Issue details	Date of issue
1		World Hockey Champions	2 stamps (Rs. 1 each), issued in gutter sheets with five gutters; three gutters showed the Hockey World Cup in blue, black and red, while two were blank	January 31, 1982
2		Handicraft Series	2 stamps (Rs. 1 each)	February 20, 1982
3		Centenary of the tuberculosis bacillus	1 stamp (Rs. 1)	March 24, 1982
4		Indus dolphins	2 stamps (40 paisa and Rs. 1)	April 24, 1982
5		Space Exploration	1 stamp (Rs. 1), issued in gutter sheets with eight gutters showing different blue-toned images	June 7, 1982
6		Golden Jubilee of Sukkur Barrage	1 stamp (Rs. 1)	July 17, 1982
7		Independence Day commemoration	2 stamps (40 and 85 paisa)	August 14, 1982
8		Riccione	1 stamp (Rs. 1), issued for the Riccione stamp exhibition by overprinting “RICCIONE 82” on the Sukkur Barrage stamp	August 28, 1982
9		Centenary of the University of the Punjab	1 stamp (Rs. 1), issued in gutter sheets with eleven purple-toned gutters showing five emblems and six university buildings	October 14, 1982
10		75th anniversary of the Scout Movement	1 stamp (Rs. 2)	December 23, 1982

== 1983 ==
No.	Stamp	Issue or subject	Issue details	Date of issue
1		Inauguration of the Quetta Natural Gas Pipeline Project	1 stamp (Rs. 2)	January 6, 1983
2		Wildlife Series, ninth issue: Butterflies	4 stamps (40, 50 and 60 paisa; Rs. 1.50), issued in gutter sheets with five gutters	February 15, 1983
3		Pakistan Handicraft Series	2 stamps (Rs. 1 each)	March 9, 1983
4		Aga Khan University	1 stamp (Rs. 2), issued in gutter sheetlets with four gutters	March 16, 1983
5		Trekking in Pakistan	1 stamp (Rs. 1)	April 28, 1983
6		Wildlife Series: Marsh crocodile	1 stamp (Rs. 3), issued in gutter sheets with five gutters	May 19, 1983
7		Wildlife Series: Chinkara	1 stamp (Rs. 1)	June 20, 1983
8		Independence Day	2 stamps (60 paisa and Rs. 4)	August 14, 1983
9		Indonesia–Pakistan Economic and Cultural Cooperation	2 stamps (Rs. 2 each); Indonesia also issued stamps for the occasion	August 19, 1983
10		Wildlife Series: Siberian cranes	1 stamp (Rs. 3)	September 20, 1983
11		World Communication Year	2 stamps (Rs. 2 and Rs. 3)	October 9, 1983
12		World Food Day	4 designs (Rs. 3 each), issued in sheetlets of 12 arranged as three horizontal se-tenant strips of four	October 24, 1983
13		National Fertilizer Corporation	1 stamp (60 paisa)	October 24, 1983
14		World Communication Year 1983 and National Stamp Exhibition — Pakphilex 1983	6 designs (60 paisa each), issued in sheetlets of 12 arranged as two horizontal se-tenant strips of six	November 13, 1983
15		Yachting Champions	2 stamps (60 paisa each)	December 31, 1983

== 1984 ==
No.	Stamp	Issue or subject	Issue details	Date of issue
1		Wildlife Series: Snow leopard	2 stamps (40 paisa and Rs. 1.60)	January 21, 1984
2		Squash	1 stamp (Rs. 3)	March 17, 1984
3		20 years of PIA service to China	1 stamp (Rs. 3)	April 29, 1984
4		Pakistan Handicraft Series	4 stamps (Rs. 1 each)	May 31, 1984
5		Definitive Forts Series	8 stamps (5, 10, 15, 20, 50, 60, 70 and 80 paisa)	—
6		Aga Khan Award for Architecture	1 stamp (60 paisa)	June 26, 1984
7		20th anniversary of the ABU	1 stamp (Rs. 3)	July 1, 1984
8		Los Angeles Olympics	5 stamps (Rs. 3 each)	July 31, 1984
9		Independence Day	2 stamps (60 paisa and Rs. 4)	August 14, 1984
10		Pakistan International Trade Fair	1 stamp (60 paisa)	November 5, 1984
11		Pakistan Tourism Convention	5 stamps (Rs. 1 each)	November 5, 1984
12		Silver Jubilee of UBL	1 stamp (60 paisa)	November 7, 1984
13		20th anniversary of UNCTAD	1 stamp (60 paisa)	December 24, 1984
14		Centenary of PLI	2 stamps (60 paisa and Rs. 1)	December 29, 1984
15		Save Mohenjo-daro	2 stamps (Rs. 2 each)	December 31, 1984

== 1985 ==
No.	Stamp	Issue or subject	Issue details	Date of issue
1		75th year of the Girl Guides movement	1 stamp (60 paisa)	January 5, 1985
2		Inauguration of Pakistan Steel Mills	2 stamps (Rs. 1 each)	January 15, 1985
3		Referendum 1984	1 stamp (60 paisa)	March 20, 1985
4		Election 1985	2 stamps (Rs. 1 each)	March 23, 1985
5		Mountain Peaks of Pakistan	2 stamps (40 paisa and Rs. 2)	May 27, 1985
6		Hockey Champions	1 stamp (Rs. 1)	July 5, 1985
7		125th year of King Edward Medical College, Lahore	1 stamp (Rs. 3)	July 28, 1985
8		Independence Day	2 stamps (60 paisa each)	August 14, 1985
9		Centenary of Sind Madressah-tul-Islam, Karachi	1 stamp (Rs. 2)	September 1, 1985
10		Jamia Masjid, Pakistan Security Printing Corporation	2 stamps (Rs. 1 each)	September 14, 1985
11		125th anniversary of Lawrence College, Murree	1 stamp (Rs. 3)	September 26, 1985
12		40th anniversary of the United Nations	2 stamps (Rs. 1 and Rs. 2)	October 24, 1985
13		10th National Scout Jamboree	1 stamp (60 paisa)	November 8, 1985
14		Silver Jubilee of Islamabad	1 stamp (Rs. 3)	November 30, 1985
15		SAARC commemoration	2 stamps (Rs. 1 and Rs. 2)	December 8, 1985
16		25th anniversary of the UN declaration on the granting of independence to colonial territories	1 stamp (60 paisa)	December 14, 1985

== 1986 ==
No.	Stamp	Issue or subject	Issue details	Date of issue
1		Wildlife Series: Shaheen falcon	1 stamp (Rs. 1.50)	January 20, 1986
2		25th anniversary of the Agricultural Development Bank of Pakistan	1 stamp (60 paisa)	February 18, 1986
3		Centenary of S. E. College, Bahawalpur	1 stamp (Rs. 1)	April 25, 1986
4		25th anniversary of the APO	1 stamp (Rs. 1)	May 11, 1986
5		Independence Day	2 stamps (80 paisa and Rs. 1)	August 14, 1986
6		International Literacy Day	1 stamp (Rs. 1)	September 8, 1986
7		Child Survival and Development Revolution	1 stamp (80 paisa)	October 28, 1986
8		Centenary of Aitchison College	1 stamp (Rs. 2.50)	November 3, 1986
9		International Year of Peace	1 stamp (Rs. 4)	November 20, 1986
10		4th Asian Cup Table Tennis Tournament	1 stamp (Rs. 2)	November 25, 1986
11		Wildlife Series	1 stamp (Rs. 2)	December 4, 1986
12		ECOPHILEX 86 National Stamp Exhibition	3 stamps (Rs. 3 each), issued in a se-tenant strip of three throughout the sheet	December 20, 1986
