= List of postage stamps of Pakistan from 1967 to 1976 =

Pakistan has, over its 60-year history, issued over 600 issues and 1,100 stamps and souvenir sheets.

- 1947 to 1966
- 1967 to 1976
- 1977 to 1986
- 1987 to 1996
- 1997 to 2006
- 2007 to 2016
- 2017 to present

== 1967 ==
- International Tourist Year – 1 January 1967
  - One stamp was issued on this occasion
  - Value: 15 Paisa
- Tuberculosis Eradication Campaign – 10 January 1967
  - One stamp was issued on this occasion
  - Value: 15 Paisa
- Fourth National Scout Jamboree – 29 January 1967
  - One stamp was issued on this occasion
  - Value: 15 Paisa
- Centenary of West Pakistan High Court 17 February
  - One stamp was issued on this occasion
  - Value: 15 Paisa
- Allama Muhammad Iqbal Commemoration – 21 April 1967
  - Two stamps were issued on this occasion
  - Values: 15 Paisa & Rs. 1
- Award of Hillal-I-Istiqlal – 15 May 1967
  - One stamp was issued on this occasion
  - Value: 15 Paisa
- 20th Anniversary of Independence – 14 August 1967
  - One stamp was issued on this occasion
  - Value: 15 Paisa
- Pakistan Major Exports – 26 September 1967
  - Three stamps were issued on this occasion
  - Values: 10 Paisa, 15 Paisa & 50 Paisa
- Universal Children's Day – 2 October 1967
  - One stamp was issued on this occasion
  - Value: 15 Paisa
- 1967 Coronation of Shah of Iran – 26 October 1967
  - One stamp was issued on this occasion
  - Value: 50 Paisa
- Co-Operative Day – 4 November 1967
  - One stamp was issued on this occasion
  - Value: 15 Paisa
- Indus Basin Project – 23 November 1967
  - One stamp was issued on this occasion
  - Value: 15 Paisa
- The Fight Against Cancer – 26 December 1967
  - One stamp was issued on this occasion
  - Value: 15 Paisa

== 1968 ==
- International Human Rights – 31 January 1968
  - Two stamps were issued on this occasion
  - Values: 15 Paisa, 50 Paisa
- First Convocation of East Pakistan Agricultural University – 28 March 1968
  - One stamp was issued on this occasion
  - Value: 15 Paisa
- 20th Anniversary of W.H.O. – 7 April 1968
  - Two stamps were issued on this occasion
  - Values: 15 Paisa, 50 Paisa
- Nazar-ul-Islam Commemoration – 25 June 1968
  - Two stamps were issued on this occasion
  - Values: 15 Paisa, 50 Paisa
  - The first with a two-line inscription set was issued but it was withdrawn for having the wrong date
- 1968–1969 Surcharged Stamps (Surcharged by typography) – 18 July 1968
  - Four stamps were overprinted Surcharge on this occasion
  - Values: 4 Paisa was overprinted on the 3a stamp Plane & Watch of 14 August 1951; 4 Paisa was overprinted on the 6a stamp Textile Mill of 14 August 1955; 60 Paisa was overprinted on the 10a stamp Archway & Lamp of 14 August 1951 in red ink; 60 Paisa was overprinted on the 10a stamp Archway & Lamp of 14 August 1951 in black ink
- 1968 Universal Children’s Day – 7 October 1968
  - One stamp was issued on this occasion
  - Value: 15 Paisa
- 1968 Decade of Development – 27 October 1968
  - Four stamps were issued on this occasion
  - Values: 10 Paisa, 15 Paisa, 50 Paisa & 60 Paisa

== 1969 ==
- Pakistan’s First Steel Mill at Chittagong – 7 January 1969
  - One stamp was issued on this occasion
  - Value: 15 Paisa,
- Family Planning – 14 January 1969
  - One stamp was issued on this occasion
  - Value: 15 Paisa,
- Olympic Hockey Champions – 20 January 1969
  - Two stamps were issued on this occasion
  - Values: 15 Paisa, Rs. 1
- Centenary of the Death of Mirza Ghalib – 15 February 1969
  - Two stamps were issued on this occasion
  - Value: 15 Paisa, 50 Paisa
- New Dacca Railway Station – 27 April 1969
  - One stamp was issued on this occasion
  - Value: 15 Paisa,
- 50th Anniversary of ILO – 15 May 1969
  - Two stamps were issued on this occasion
  - Values: 15 Paisa, 50 Paisa
- 5th Anniversary of R.C.D. – 21 July 1969
  - Three stamps were issued on this occasion
  - Values: 20 Paisa, 50 Paisa, and Rs. 1
- First Oil Refinery in East Pakistan – 15 September 1969
  - One stamp was issued on this occasion
  - Value: 20 Paisa,
- Universal Children's Day – 6 October 1969
  - One stamp was issued on this occasion
  - Value: 20 Paisa,
- Inauguration of P.I.A. Peal Route, Dhaka –Tokyo – 1 November 1969
  - Two stamps were issued on this occasion
  - Values: 20 Paisa, 50 Paisa
- 1969 –11 1000th Anniversary of Ibn-al-Haitham – 4 November 1969
  - One stamp was issued on this occasion
  - Value: 20 Paisa,
- 50th Anniversary of 1st England-Australia Flight – 2 December 1969
  - One stamp was issued on this occasion
  - Value: 50 Paisa,

== 1970 ==
- World Fair Osaka Expo – 70 – 15 March 1970
  - One stamp was issued on this occasion
  - Value: 50 Paisa,
- New U.P.U. Headquarters – 20 May 1970
  - Two stamps were issued on this occasion
  - Values: 20 Paisa, 50 Paisa,
- 25th Anniversary of U.N.O. – 26 June 1970
  - Two stamps were issued on this occasion
  - Values: 20 Paisa, 50 Paisa,
- International Education Year – 6 July 1970
  - Two stamps were issued on this occasion
  - Values: 20 Paisa, 50 Paisa,
- Sixth Anniversary of R.C.D. – 21 July 1970
  - Three stamps were issued on this occasion
  - Value: 20 Paisa, 50 Paisa, Rs. 1
- Asian Productivity Year – 18 August 1970
  - One stamp was issued on this occasion
  - Value: 50 Paisa,
- Centenary of the Birth of Dr. Maria Montessori – 31 August 1970
  - Two stamps were issued on this occasion
  - Value: 20 Paisa, 50 Paisa,
- 10th F.A.O. Conference for the Near East, Islamabad – 12 September 1970
  - One stamp was issued on this occasion
  - Value: 20 Paisa,
- Universal Children's Day – 5 October 1970
  - One stamp was issued on this occasion
  - Value: 20 Paisa
- National Assembly Elections – 7 December 1970
  - One stamp was issued on this occasion
  - Value: 20 Paisa
- Provincial Assembly Elections – 17 December 1970
  - One stamp was issued on this occasion
  - Value: 20 Paisa
- Conference of Islamic Foreign Minister, Karachi – 26 December 1970
  - One stamp was issued on this occasion
  - Value: 20 Paisa

== 1971 ==
- Coastal Embankments in East Pakistan – 25 February 1971
  - One stamp was issued on this occasion
  - Value: 20 Paisa
- Racial Equality Year – 21 March 1971
  - Two stamps were issued on this occasion
  - Values: 20 Paisa, 50 Paisa
- 20th Anniversary of Colombo Plan – 1 July 1971
  - One stamp was issued on this occasion
  - Value: 20 Paisa
- Seventh Anniversary of R.C.D. – 21 July 1971
  - Three stamps were issued on this occasion
  - Value: 20 Paisa, 50 Paisa, 50 Paisa
- Universal Children’s Day– 4 October 1971
  - One stamp was issued on this occasion

88 Value: 20 Paisa

- Universal Postal Union Souvenir Sheet – 9 October 1971
  - Pakistan's first Souvenir Sheet was issued on this occasion
  - Size 140 mm × 128 mm (5.5 in × 5.0 in)
  - Quantity issued: 10,000
  - Value: 70 Paisa
- 2500th Anniversary of Persian Monarchy – 15 October 1971
  - One Souvenir Sheet and three stamps were issued on this occasion
  - Second Souvenir Sheet of Pakistan Size 140 mm × 130 mm (5.5 in × 5.1 in) – Quantity issued: 10,000
  - Values: 10 Paisa, 20 Paisa, 50 Paisa and Miniature Sheet 80 Paisa
- World Cup Hockey Tournament – 24 October 1971
  - One stamp was issued on this occasion
  - Value: 20 Paisa
- 25th Anniversary UNESCO – 4 November 1971
  - One stamp was issued on this occasion
  - Value: 20 Paisa
- 25th Anniversary of UNICEF – 11 December 1971
  - One stamp was issued on this occasion
  - Value: 50 Paisa
- 50th Anniversary of Hashemite Kingdom of Jordan – 25 December 1971
  - One stamp was issued on this occasion
  - Value: 20 Paisa
- Hockey Championship Victory – 31 December 1971
  - One stamp was issued on this occasion
  - Value: 20 Paisa

== 1972 ==
- International Book Year – 15 January 1972
  - One stamp was issued on this occasion
  - Value: 20 Paisa
- UNESCO Campaign to Save Venice – 7 February 1972
  - One stamp was issued on this occasion
  - Value: 20 Paisa
- 25th Anniversary of ECAFE – 28 March 1972
  - One stamp was issued on this occasion
  - Value: 20 Paisa
- World Health Day – 7 April 1972
  - One stamp was issued on this occasion
  - Value: 20 Paisa
- U.N. Conference on the Human Environment, Stockholm – 5 June 1972
  - One stamp was issued on this occasion
  - Value: 20 Paisa
- Eighth Anniversary of R.C.D. – 21 July 1972
  - Three stamps were issued on this occasion
  - Values: 10 Paisa, 20 Paisa, 50 Paisa,
- 25th Anniversary of Pakistan Independence – 14 August 1972
  - Six stamps were issued on this occasion
  - Values: 20 Paisa (4 different stamp designs), 10 Paisa, Paisa 60
- National Blood Transfusion Service – 6 September 1972
  - One stamp was issued on this occasion
  - Value: 20 Paisa
- Centenary of Population Census – 16 September 1972
  - One stamp was issued on this occasion
  - Value: 20 Paisa
- Universal Children’s Day– 2 October 1972
  - One stamp was issued on this occasion
  - Value: 20 Paisa
- Education Week– 23 October 1972
  - One stamp was issued on this occasion
  - Value: 20 Paisa
- Inauguration of Karachi Nuclear Power Plant – 28 November 1972
  - One stamp was issued on this occasion
  - Value: 20 Paisa

== 1973 ==
- 500th Birth Anniversary of Copernicus– 19 February 1973
  - One stamp was issued on this occasion
  - Value: 20 Paisa
- 50th Anniversary of Mohenjadaro Excavations – 23 February 1973
  - One stamp was issued on this occasion
  - Value: 20 Paisa
- I.M.O. W.M.O. Centenary – 23 March 1973
  - One stamp was issued on this occasion
  - Value: 20 Paisa
- Prisoners of War in India – 18 April 1973
  - One stamp was issued on this occasion
  - Value: Rs. 1.25
- Constitution Week – 21 April 1973
  - One stamp was issued on this occasion
  - Value: 20 Paisa
- 25th Anniversary of State Bank of Pakistan – 1 July 1973
  - Two stamps were issued on this occasion
  - Values: 20 Paisa, Rs. 1
- Ninth Anniversary of R.C.D. – 21 July 1973
  - Three stamp were issued on this occasion
  - Value: 20 Paisa, 60 Paisa, Rs. 1.25
- Independence Day and Enforcement of the Constitution – 14 August 1973
  - One stamp was issued on this occasion
  - Value: 20 Paisa
- 25th Death Anniversary of Quaid-e-Azam – 11 September 1973
  - One stamp was issued on this occasion
  - Value: 20 Paisa
- Fishes – 24 September 1973
  - Four stamp were issued on this occasion
  - Values: 10 Paisa, 20 Paisa, 60 Paisa, and Rs. 1
- Universal Children’s Day– 1 October 1973
  - One stamp was issued on this occasion
  - Value: 20 Paisa
- 10th Anniversary of Food Program – 15 October 1973
  - One stamp was issued on this occasion
  - Value: 20 Paisa
- 50th Anniversary of Turkish Republic – 29 October 1973
  - One stamp was issued on this occasion
  - Value: 50 Paisa
- National Silver Jubilee Scout Jamboree – 11 November 1973
  - One stamp was issued on this occasion
  - Value: 20 Paisa
- 25th Anniversary of Declaration of Human Rights– 16 November 1973
  - One stamp was issued on this occasion
  - Value: 20 Paisa
- International Congress of Millennium of Al-Biruni – 26 November 1973
  - Two stamp were issued on this occasion
  - Values: 20 Paisa, Rs. 1.25
- Centenary of Hansen’s Discovery of Leprosy Bacillus – 29 December 1973
  - One stamp was issued on this occasion
  - Value: 20 Paisa

== 1974 ==
- World Population Year – 1 January 1974
  - Two stamps were issued on this occasion
  - Values: 20 Paisa, Rs. 1.25
- Second Islamic Summit Pakistan – 22 February 1974
  - One Souvenir Sheet & Two Stamp were issued on this occasion
  - Values: 20 Paisa, 50 Paisa, Souvenir Sheet 85 Paisa
- Introduction of International System of weights and Measures in Pakistan – 1 July 1974
  - One stamp was issued on this occasion
  - Value: 20 Paisa
- 10th Anniversary of R.C.D. – 21 July 1974
  - Three stamps were issued on this occasion
  - Values: 20 Paisa, 60 Paisa, Rs. 1.25
- National Day of Plantation – 9 August 1974
  - One stamp was issued on this occasion
  - Value: 20 Paisa
- Namibia Day – 26 August 1974
  - One stamp was issued on this occasion
  - Value: 60 Paisa
- Shahrah-e-Pakistan Commemorative – 23 September 1974
  - One stamp was issued on this occasion
  - Value: 20 Paisa
- Universal Children's Day – 7 October 1974
  - One stamp was issued on this occasion
  - Value: 20 Paisa
- 1974 –9 Centenary of U.P.U. – 9 October 1974
  - One Souvenir Sheet & Two Stamp were issued on this occasion
  - Values: 20 Paisa, Rs. 2.25, Souvenir Sheet Rs. 2.45
- Liaquat Ali Khan's Death Anniversary – 16 October 1974
  - One stamp was issued on this occasion
  - Values: 20 Paisa
- Dr. Iqbal Commemoration – 9 November 1974
  - One stamp was issued on this occasion
  - Value: 20 Paisa

== 1975 ==
- Birth Centenary of Dr. Albert Schweitzer – 14 January 1975
  - One stamp was issued on this occasion
  - Value: Rs. 2.25
- South Asia Tourism Commemoration – 15 January 1975
  - One stamp was issued on this occasion
  - Value: Rs. 2.25
- Anniversary of Second Islamic Summit – 22 February 1975
  - Two stamps were issued on this occasion
  - Value: 20 Paisa, Rs. 1
- International Women's Year – 15 June 1975
  - Two stamps were issued on this occasion
  - Value: 20 Paisa, Rs. 2.25
- International Congress of Mathematical Sciences – 14 July 1975
  - One stamp was issued on this occasion
  - Value: 20 Paisa
- 11th Anniversary of R.C.D. – 21 July 1975
  - Three stamps were issued on this occasion
  - Values: 20 Paisa, 60 Paisa, Rs. 1.25
- Tree Plantation Day – 9 August 1975
  - One stamp was issued on this occasion
  - Value: 20 Paisa
- Wildlife Series (1) – 30 September 1975
  - Two stamps were issued on this occasion
  - Value: 20 Paisa, Rs. 2.25
- Universal Children’s Day – 6 October 1975
  - One stamp was issued on this occasion
  - Value: 20 Paisa
- 700th Anniversary of Amir Khusrau – 24 October 1975
  - Two stamps were issued on this occasion
  - Values: 20 Paisa, Rs. 2.25
- Dr. Mohammad Iqbal Commemorative – 9 November 1975
  - One stamp was issued on this occasion
  - Value: 20 Paisa
- Wildlife Series (2) – 31 December 1975
  - Two stamps were issued on this occasion
  - Values: 20 Paisa, Rs. 3

== 1976 ==
- Save Mohenjadaro Series – 29 February 1975
  - Five stamps in a se-tenant Gutter sheet were issued on this occasion
  - Values: 10 Paisa, 20 Paisa, 65 Paisa, Rs. 3, Rs. 4
- International Seerat Congress – 3 March 1976
  - Two stamps were issued on this occasion
  - Values: 20 Paisa, Rs. 3
- Centenary of First Telephone Transmission – 10 March 1976
  - One stamp was issued on this occasion
  - Value: Rs. 3
- Centenary of National College of Arts, Lahore – 15 March 1976
  - One stamp was issued on this occasion
  - Value: 20 Paisa
- Wildlife Series (3) – 31 March 1976
  - Two stamps were issued on this occasion
  - Values: 20 Paisa, Rs. 3
- World Health Day – 7 April 1976
  - One stamp was issued on this occasion
  - Value: 20 Paisa
- Save Mohenjadaro Series – 31 May 1976
  - One stamp was issued on this occasion
  - Value: 20 Paisa
- American Revolution Bicentennial – 4 July 1976
  - Two stamps were issued on this occasion
  - Values: 90 Paisa, Rs. 4
- Wildlife Series (4) – 12 July 1976
  - Two stamps were issued on this occasion
  - Values: 20 Paisa, Rs. 3
- 12th Anniversary of R.C.D. – 21 July 1976
  - Three stamps were issued on this occasion
  - Values: 20 Paisa, 60 p, 90 p
- Quaid-i-Azam 100th Anniversary Commemorative – 14 August 1976
  - Eight stamps in a se-tenant block of 8 were issued on this occasion
  - Values: 5 Paisa, 10 Paisa, 15 Paisa, 20 Paisa, 40 Paisa, 50 Paisa, Rs. 1, Rs. 3
- Mohenjadaro Series(3) – 31 August 1976
  - One stamp was issued on this occasion
  - Value: 65 Paisa
- Combat Racial Discrimination Commemorative – 15 September 1976
  - One stamp was issued on this occasion
  - Value: 65 Paisa
- Universal Children's Day– 4 October 1976
  - One stamp was issued on this occasion
  - Value: 20 Paisa
- Muhammad Iqbal Centenary Commemorative – 9 November 1976
  - One stamp was issued on this occasion
  - Value: 20 Paisa
- Quaid-e-Azam Centenary Scout Jamboree
  - One stamp was issued on this occasion
  - Value: 20 Paisa
- Children's Literature – 15 December 1976
  - One stamp was issued on this occasion
  - Value: 20 Paisa
- Quaid-i-Azam Birth Centenary – 25 December 1976
  - One stamp was issued on this occasion
  - First time in Pakistan a gold stamp was issued. Each stamp contains 25 mg of 23/24 carat gold
  - Printed by De Carter SA Paris, France
  - Officially A Imperf Sheet of 10 Stamps and a presentation sheet with one stamp in the centre were issued
  - Value: Rs. 10
