= List of postage stamps of Pakistan from 1947 to 1966 =

This is a list of postage stamps and souvenir sheets issued by Pakistan Post from 1947 to 1966.

- 1947 to 1966
- 1967 to 1976
- 1977 to 1986
- 1987 to 1996
- 1997 to 2006
- 2007 to 2016
- 2017 to present

== 1947 ==
- Indian postage stamps overprinted "Pakistan" – 1 October 1947
  - 19 stamps overprinted with "PAKISTAN" were issued.
  - Values: 3P, 1/2 a, 9P, 1a, 1½ a, 2a.3a, 3½ a, 4a, 6a, 8a, 12a, 14a, Rs.1, Rs.2, Rs.5.

Rs.10, Rs.15, Rs.25

== 1948 ==
- Independence commemorative – 9 July 1948
  - Four stamps were issued
  - Values: 1½ a, 2½a. 3a, Rs.1,

These stamps were designed by Abdul Rehman Chughtai

- First regular series (Crescent and Star facing Northeast) – 14 August 1948
  - 20 definitive stamps were issued on this occasion
  - Values: 3P, 6P, 9P, 1a, 1½a, 2a, 2½a, 3a, 3½a, 4a, 6a, 8a, 10a, 12a,

Rs.1, Rs.2, Rs.5, Rs.10, Rs.15, R50

== 1949 ==
- 1st Anniversary of the Death of Quaid-e-Azam – 11 September 1949
  - Three stamps were issued on this occasion
  - Values: 1½a, 3a, 10a.
- 1st Regular Series (Crescent and Star facing Northwest) – February 1949
  - Eight stamps were issued on this occasion
  - Values: 1a, 1½a, 2a, 3a, 6a, 8a, 10a, 12a,

== 1950 ==
No stamps were issued

== 1951 ==
- Fourth Anniversary of Independence – 14 August 1951
  - Nine stamps were issued on this occasion
  - Values: 2½a, 3a, 3½a,(Die I) 3½a,(Die II), 4a, 6a, 8a. 10a, 12a,

== 1952 ==
- Scinde Dawk Commemorative – 14 August 1952
  - Two stamps were issued on this occasion
  - Values: 3a, 12a.

== 1953 ==
No stamps were issued

== 1954 ==
- Seventh Anniversary of Independence – 14 August 1954
  - Seven stamps were issued on this occasion
  - Values: 6p, 9p, 1a, 1½a, 14a, Rs.1, Rs.2
- Conquest of K2 Commemorative – 25 December 1954
  - One stamp was issued on this occasion
  - Value: 2a

== 1955 ==
- Eighth Anniversary of Independence – 14 August 1955
  - Five stamps were issued on this occasion
  - Values: 2½a (Die I ), 2½a (Die II), 6a, 8a, 12a
- 10th Anniversary of United Nations – 24 October 1955
  - Two Stamps were issued on this occasion
  - Values: 1½a, 12a
- Unification of West Pakistan – 7 December 1955
  - Three stamps were issued on this occasion
  - Values: 1½a, 2a, 12a,

== 1956 ==
- The Republic Day Commemorative – 23 March 1956
  - One stamp was issued on this occasion
  - Value: 2a
- Ninth Anniversary of Independence – 14 August 1956
  - One stamp was issued on this occasion
  - Value: 2a
- 1st Session of National Assembly of Pakistan at Dacca – 1956
  - Three stamps were issued on this occasion
  - Values: 1½a, 2a, 12a

== 1957 ==
- First Anniversary of Republic Day – 23 March 1957
  - Three stamps were issued on this occasion
  - Values: 2½a, 3½a, Rs.10
- Centenary of Struggle for Independence – 10 May 1957
  - Two Stamps were issued on this occasion
  - Value: 2a
- 10th Anniversary of Independence – 14 August 1957
  - Three stamps were issued on this occasion
  - Values: 1½a, 4a, 12a

== 1958 ==
- Second anniversary of Republic Day – 23 March 1958
  - One stamp was issued on this occasion
  - Value: Rs.15
- 20th Anniversary of the Death of Muhammad Iqbal – 21 April 1958
  - Three stamps were issued on this occasion
  - Values: 1½a, 2a, 14a
- 10th Anniversary of Human Rights – 10 December 1958
  - Two stamps were issued on this occasion
  - Values: 1½a, 14a
- Second National Jamboree of Pakistan Boy Scouts – 28 December 1958
  - Two stamps were overprinted on this occasion
  - Value: 6p, 8a

== 1959 ==
- Revolution Day – 27 October 1959
  - One stamp was overprinted on this occasion
  - Value: 6a
- Red Cross Centenary – 19 November 1959
  - Two stamps were issued on this occasion
  - Values: 2a, 10a

== 1960 ==
- Armed Forces Day – 10 January 1960
  - Two stamps were issued on this occasion
  - Values: 2a, 14a
- 1960 – Jammu & Kashmir Definitives Issue – 23 March 1960
  - Four stamps were issued on this occasion
  - Values: 6p, 2a, 8a, Rs.1
- World Refugee Year – 7 April 1960
  - Two stamps were issued on this occasion
  - Values: 2a, 10a,
- Golden Jubilee of Punjab Agricultural College, Lyallpur (now Faisalabad) – 10 October 1960
  - Two stamps were issued on this occasion
  - Values: 2a, 8a,
- Revolution Day Commemoration – 27 October 1960
  - Two stamps were issued on this occasion
  - Values: 2a, 14a,
- Centenary of King Edward Medical College, Lahore – 16 November 1960
  - Two stamps were issued on this occasion
  - Values: 2a, 14a,
- International Chamber of Commerce, CAFEA Meeting – 5 December 1960
  - One stamp was issued on this occasion
  - Value: 14a
- Third Pakistan Boy Scouts National Jamboree, Lahore – 24 December 1960
  - One stamp was issued on this occasion
  - Value: 2a

== 1961 ==
- 1961 – (Currency Changed 100 Paisa = Re. 1 New Currency Overprint) – 10 January 1961
  - Six stamps were overprinted with new currency on this occasion
  - Values: 1p, 2p, 3p, 7p, 13p, 13p
- 1961–63 5th Definitive Series, "SHAKISTAN" instead of “PAKISTAN” printed in Bangali
  - Three stamps were issued on this occasion
  - Values: 1p, 2p, 5p
- 1961–63 5th Definitives Series
  - 16 stamps were issued on this occasion
  - Values: 1p, 2p, 3p, 5p, 7p, 10p, 13p, 25p, 40p, 50p,75p, 90p, Re.1, Rs.1.25, Rs.2, Rs.5
- Lahore Stamp Exhibition – 12 February 1961
  - One stamp was issued on this occasion
  - Value: 8a
- Completion of Warsak Hydroelectric Project – 1 July 1961
  - One stamp was issued on this occasion
  - Value: 40p
- Child Welfare Week – 2 October 1961

Two stamps were issued on this occasion Values: 13p, 90p

- Co-operative Day – 4 November 1961
  - Two stamps were issued on this occasion
  - Values: 13p, 90p
- Police Centenary – 30 November 1961
  - Two stamps were issued on this occasion
  - Values: 13p, 90p
- Railway Centenary – 31 December 1961
  - Two stamps were issued on this occasion
  - Values: 13p, 50p

== 1962 ==
- 1st Karachi – Dacca Jet Flight – 6 February 1962
  - One stamp was overprinted on this occasion
  - Value: 13p,
- Malaria Eradication – 7 April 1962
  - Two stamps were issued on this occasion
  - Values: 10p, 13p
- New Constitution – 8 June 1962
  - One stamp was issued on this occasion
  - Value: 40p
- Sports – 14 August 1962
  - Four stamps were issued on this occasion
  - Values: 7p, 13p, 25p, 40p
- Small Industries – 10 November 1962
  - Five stamps were issued on this occasion
  - Values: 7p, 13p, 25p, 40p, 50p
- 16th Anniversary of UNICEF – 11 December 1962
  - Two stamps were issued on this occasion
  - Values: 13p, 40p
- 1962–70 – 5th Definitive Series Redrawn Bengali inscription - Die II
  - 14 stamps were issued on this occasion
  - Values: 1p, 2p, 3p, 5p, 7p, 10p, 13p, 15p, 20p, 25p, 40p, 50p, 75p, 90p

== 1963 ==
- U.N. Force in West Irian – 15 February 1963
  - One stamp was issued on this occasion
  - Value: 13p
- National Horse and Cattle Show – 13 March 1963
  - One stamp was issued on this occasion
  - Value: 13p
- Freedom from Hunger – 21 March 1963
  - Two stamps were issued on this occasion
  - Values: 13p, 50p
- Second International Dacca Stamp Exhibition – 23 March 1963
  - One stamp was overprinted on this occasion
  - Value: 13p
- Centenary of the Red Cross – 25 June 1963
  - One stamp was issued on this occasion
  - Value: 40p
- Archaeological Series – 16 September 1963
  - Four stamps were issued on this occasion
  - Values: 7p, 13p, 40p, 50p
- Centenary of Public Works Department – 7 October 1963
  - One stamp was overprinted on this occasion
  - Value: 13p
- 25th Death Anniversary of Mustafa Kemal Atatürk – 10 November 1963
  - One stamp was issued on this occasion
  - Value: 50p
- 15th Anniversary of the Universal Declaration of Human Rights – 10 December 1963
  - One stamp was issued on this occasion
  - Value: 50p
- Completion of Multan Thermal Power Station – 25 December 1963
  - One stamp was issued on this occasion
  - Value: 13p
- 1963–1968 Eleven stamps already issued now printed on watermarked paper
  - Seven stamps were issued on this occasion
  - Values: Rs.1, Rs.1.25, Rs.2, Rs.5, Rs.10, Rs.15, Rs.25

== 1964 ==
- Nubian Monuments Preservation – 30 March 1964
  - Two Stamps were issued on this occasion
  - Values: 13p, 50p
- 1964 New York World's Fair – 22 April 1964
  - Two Stamps were issued on this occasion
  - Values: 13p, Rs.1.25
- Bicentenary of Death of Shah Abdul Latif of Bhit – 25 June 1964
  - One Stamp was issued on this occasion
  - Value: 50p
- 16th Anniversary of Death of Quaid-e-Azam – 11 September 1964
  - Two stamps were issued on this occasion
  - Values: 15p, 50p
- Universal Children’s Day – 5 October 1964
  - One Stamp was issued on this occasion
  - Value: 15p
- West Pakistan University of Engineering & Technology 1st Convocation – 21 December 1964
  - One stamp was issued on this occasion
  - Value: 15p

== 1965 ==
- Blind Welfare – 28 February 1965
  - One stamp was issued on this occasion
  - Value: 15p
- Centenary of International Telecommunication Union 17 May 1965
  - One stamp was issued on this occasion
  - Value: 15p
- International Co-operation Year – 26 June 1965
  - Two stamps were issued on this occasion
  - Values: 15p, 50p
- First Anniversary of RCD – 21 July 1965
  - Two stamps were issued on this occasion
  - Values: 15p, 50p
- Pakistan Armed Forces – 25 December 1965
  - Three stamps were issued on this occasion
  - Values: 7p, 15p, 50p

== 1966 ==
- Armed Forces Day – 13 February 1966
  - One stamp was issued on this occasion
  - Value: 15p
- Inauguration of 1st Atomic Reactor of Pakistan, Islamabad – 30 April 1966
  - One stamp was issued on this occasion
  - Value: 15p
- Silver Jubilee of Habib Bank – 25 August 1966
  - One stamp was issued on this occasion
  - Value: 15p
- Universal Children's Day – 3 October 1966
  - One stamp was issued on this occasion
  - Value: 15p
- 20th Anniversary of UNESCO – 24 November 1966
  - One stamp was issued on this occasion
  - Value: 15p
- Islamabad, New Capital – 29 November 1966
  - Two stamps were issued on this occasion
  - Values: 15p, 50p
- Foundation of Health and TIBI Research Institute – 3 December 1966
  - One stamp was issued on this occasion
  - Value: 15p
- 90th Birth Anniversary of Quaid-e-Azam – 25 December 1966
  - Two stamps were issued on this occasion
  - Values: 15p, 50p
