= Army Burn Hall College =

School & College in Abbottabad, Khyber Pakhtunkhwa, Pakistan

- آرمی برن ہال کالج

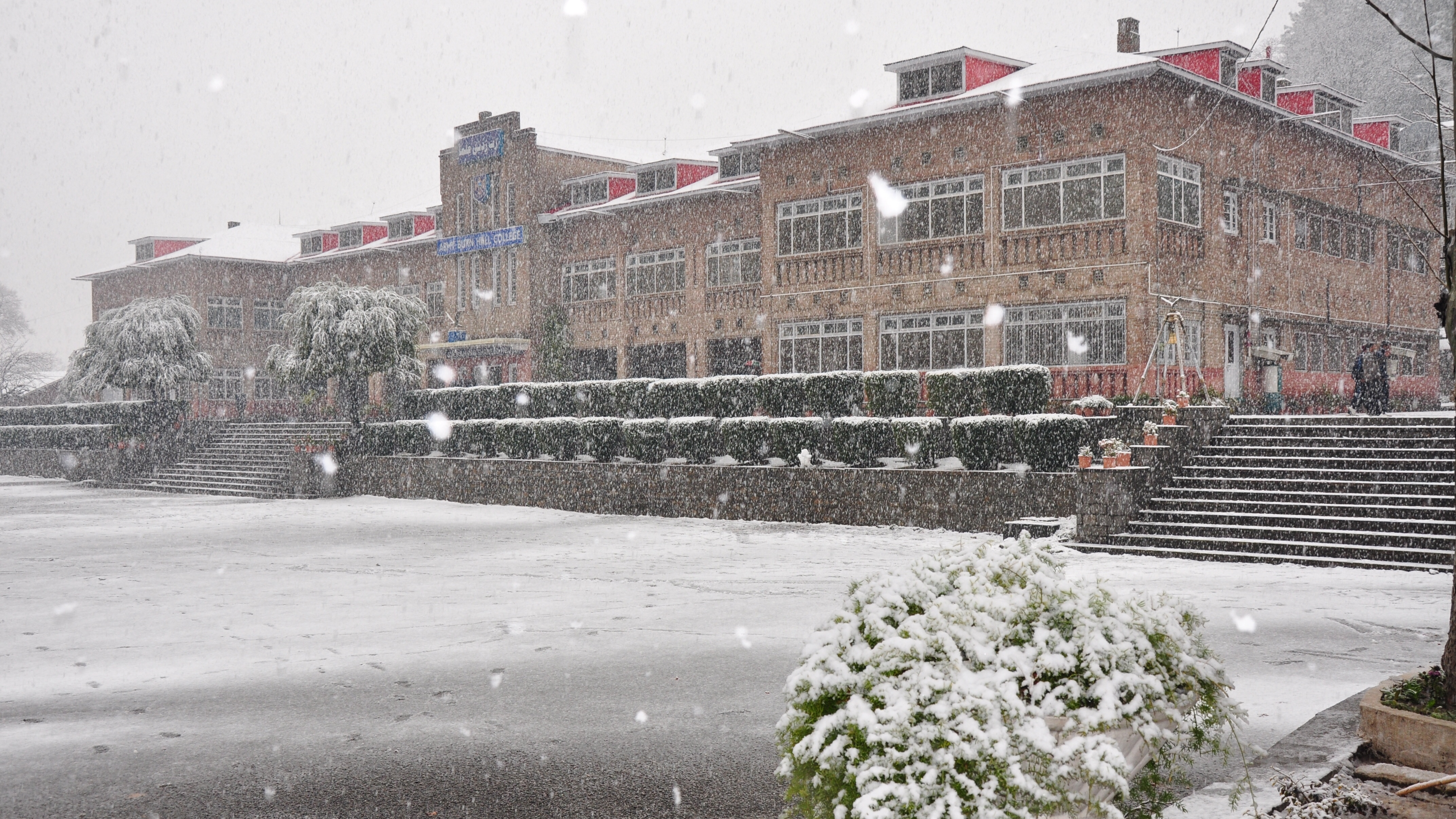
- View of Syed Ahmad Shaheed House

Location
- Abbottabad, Khyber Pakhtunkhwa, 22044; Pakistan
- Coordinates: 34°11′23″N 73°13′53″E

Information
- Other names: Burn Hall; ABHC
- Former names: Senior Cambridge School; Burn Hall School Divided into: 1. Senior Burn Hall; 2. Junior Burn Hall
- Type: Selective, army-run day & boarding school and college
- Motto: Latin: Quo non ascendam (To what heights can I not rise?)
- Established: 1943; 83 years ago
- Founders: Father Herman Thijssen; Father George Shanks; Father Francis Scanlon
- Status: Open
- Sister school: Burn Hall School in Srinagar, India
- School board: Board of Governors Army Burn Hall Institutions (BOG ABHI)
- Authority: Pakistan Army Education Corps
- Chairman: Lieutenant General Shahid Imtiaz, HI (M)
- Principal: Colonel Dr. Atiq Ullah Khan
- Faculty: Approx. 300
- Enrollment: approx.2900
- Language: English; Urdu
- Campuses: 1. Army Burn Hall College; 2. Army Burn Hall College for Girls; 3. Army Burn Hall College for Girls (Narrian Link Road)
- Area: 19 hectares (47 acres) (Boys' campus)
- Houses: SAS; SIS; SKS; STS
- Colours: Blue and white
- Song: Ham to Burn Hall kay Shaheen Sifat Jawaan, ہم تو برن ہال کے شاہین صفت جوان
- Athletics: Gymnastics; Judo; Karate; Taekwondo
- Sports: Badminton; Basketball; Cricket; Football; Hockey; Horse Riding; Swimming; Table Tennis; Tennis; Squash; Volleyball
- Mascot: Golden Eagle
- Nickname: Hallians (official); Burn Hall Eagles
- National ranking: The Best
- Yearbook: The Hallmark (Urdu: نشان)
- Feeder to: Pakistan Military Academy
- Affiliations: Federal Board of Intermediate and Secondary Education * Cambridge Assessment International Education *SAT * IELTS * Duke of Edinburgh International Award
- Alumni: Hallians
- Website: abhc.edu.pk

Army Burn Hall College (Urdu: آرمی برن ہال کالج; Pashto: د ارمي برن هال کالج; commonly referred to as Burn Hall and abbreviated as ABHC) is a highly selective, Pakistan Army-administered day and boarding school and college in Abbottabad, Pakistan. It was founded in 1943 by members of Saint Joseph's Missionary Society of Mill Hill (MHM) in British India as a missionary school for boys, named "Senior Cambridge School" (later "Burn Hall School"). It was ceded to Pakistan Army Education Corps in 1977 and was renamed Army Burn Hall College. It has since expanded to multiple single-sex campuses for boys and girls in the city offering education up to master's level. Burn Hall's history and influence have made it one of the most prestigious and elite schools in the subcontinent.

== Etymology ==
The name "Burn Hall" comes from the Scottish and Northern English word burn meaning 'a stream or a small river', and the British English word hall meaning 'a large country house, especially one with a landed estate'. The Mill Hill Fathers named Burn Hall School after their own seminary that was housed in Burn Hall – an ancient "hall" that has a "burn" called River Browney running through its grounds in County Durham, North East England.

The institution was granted the prefix "Army" in 1977 after the change of administration and it was called a "college" on the pattern of cadet colleges and other prestigious institutions of the world.

== History ==
=== Colonial ===
In 1879, Cardinal Herbert Vaughan sent Mill Hill Missionaries to the north of British India to serve as army chaplains during the Second Anglo-Afghan War. After the end of that conflict, they were entrusted with the pastoral care of Catholic troops in the Punjab and North West Frontier regions, and with the evangelisation of Kashmir and Kafiristan. In 1884, they made a missionary settlement in Kashmir, because of its favourable climate compared to the mountain climate of Ladakh, on land granted by the maharaja and established "Senior Cambridge School" (now called Burn Hall School) in Srinagar in 1943 or late 1942.

=== Post-independence ===
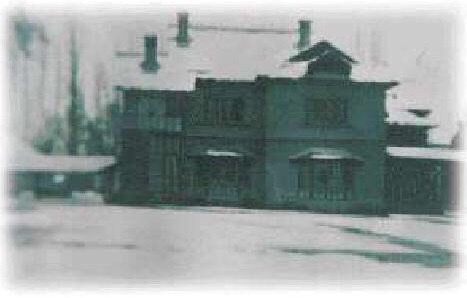
A building at Burn Hall School (1956)

At the time of partition of India, the Mill Hill mission was thrown into disarray by the Kashmir conflict and the school was closed. In April 1948, Father Herman Thijssen moved to Abbottabad and, along with Father Francis Scanlon, Father George Shanks and Father John Boerkamp, set up Burn Hall School in Abbott Hotel. Here, they replicated the English school system that they had themselves studied in. More buildings were later added to accommodate an increasing number of students. The Fathers promoted sports and extracurricular activities such as art, debates, dramatics and music as a means of character building. In 1949, Thijssen went on to establish St. Mary's Academy, Rawalpindi.

After the creation of Pakistan, foreign missionaries could no longer hope for residential permits. So, the Mill Hillers who had spent almost the whole of their lives in British India remained in Abbottabad to provide further service to the school. Burn Hall school later came under the control of the Diocesan Board of Education, Rawalpindi. In 1956, a new campus was constructed on Mansehra Road, a few miles outside the town, to provide more room for the seniors. It came to be known as Senior Burn Hall and the older campus Junior Burn Hall. The school in Srinagar was also reopened after nine years in 1956 by Boerkamp as "Burn Hall School". It has since been educating much of Kashmir Valley's elite.

=== Administration ===
Syed Ahmad Shaheed House (1977)

Senior Burn Hall was renamed Army Burn Hall College (which is the present-day main campus) and Junior Burn Hall became Army Burn Hall College for Girls.

On 28 October 1993, Pakistan Post issued 1 million commemorative postage stamps to celebrate 50 years of Burn Hall Institutions.

In March 2018, Burn Hall celebrated its 75-year anniversary with a three-day mega event. It was attended by a large number of alumni of all ages. Gohar Ayub Khan, being an old Hallian, announced the launch of the book History of Burn Hall on behalf of the college. On 5 March, Pakistan Post issued commemorative postage stamps to mark the event.

== Motto ==
The motto of Burn Hall is the Latin phrase "Quo non ascendam" (To what heights can I not rise?). It can be traced back to the 17th century when the phrase "Quo non ascendet?" (What heights will he not scale?) appeared on the coat of arms of Nicolas Fouquet, the last Superintendent of Finances of France, as a symbol of his rapid ascension. His family also traditionally bore the motto and it can be found in many rooms and decorations at Château de Vaux-le-Vicomte.

== Houses ==
The word house may refer to a particular building, i.e. a boarding house, as well as a grouping of pupils (boarders and day scholars). A (boarding) house is where the boarders make their home while at school. Each house has its own logo, motto and colour(s). Each house has a housemaster (HM) who is a member of the staff responsible for pupils living in that particular house or dormitory. The HMs act in loco parentis. They appoint students as house prefects for the tenure of an academic year, who exercise limited authority within a particular house and assist in its organisation.

Every student is assigned to one of the four houses on entering Burn Hall. For accommodation purposes, SKS House has two blocks, namely SKS-A and SKS-B; thus there are five boarding houses on-campus. Boarders and day scholars are evenly distributed between the houses. The houses compete against one another in curricular and extracurricular activities for various trophies and titles.

=== Syed Ahmad Shaheed ===
- Motto: Latin: Fortis in arduis (Strong in adversary)
- House colour: Blue

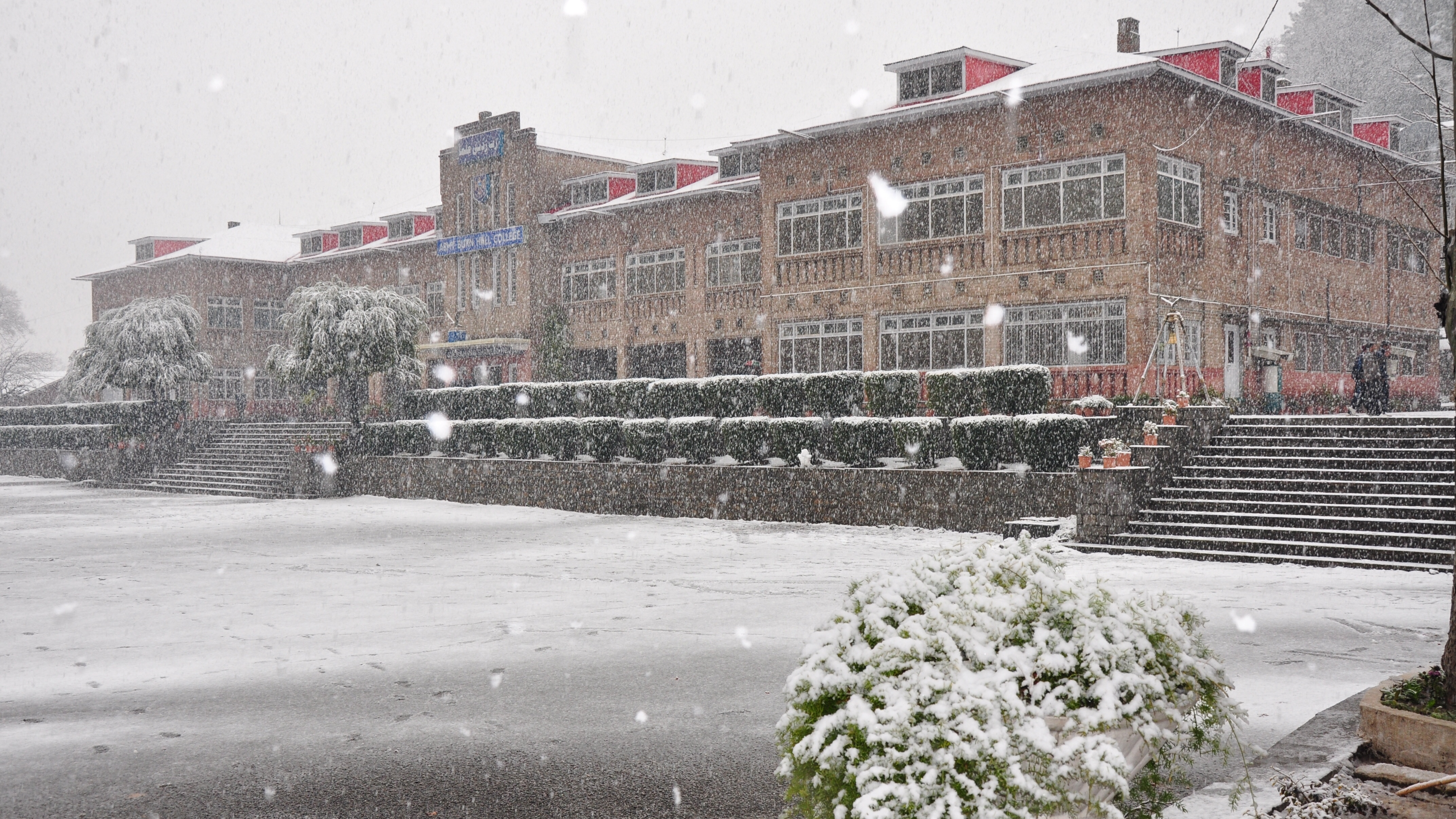
SAS House and hockey field (foreground) during a snowfall (February 2010)

Syed Ahmad Shaheed House (SAS House) was named after the revolutionary Islamist and hero of the Battle of Balakot, Syed Ahmad Shaheed (1786–1831). It was known as St Gabriel House, named after the Angel of Revelation, Archangel Gabriel, until the transfer of control of the college in 1977. Its logo used to have two lions which were later replaced with two Stone Age clubs. SAS House values courage, bravery and justice. Its building was initially the main building of the college and is a classic example of British architecture with wooden upper floors. It is a three-storey building with the capacity to accommodate more than 150 students. It is Burn Hall's most notable building and is featured on both the commemorative postage stamps issued on its 50 and 75 year anniversaries.

=== Shah Ismail Shaheed ===
- Motto: Latin: Sans peur (Without fear)
- House colour: Crimson

Shah Ismail Shaheed House (SIS House) was named after the Islamic scholar, Shah Ismail Dehlvi (1779–1831), who was also a devoted follower and companion of Syed Ahmad Shaheed. Until 1977, it was known as St Michael House, named after the archangel, Michael. Its logo has an axe and a club which represents the transition from the Stone Age to the Bronze Age. SIS values ambition, leadership and sacrifice. Its building has the capacity to accommodate more than 150 students and has the new Students' Mess in its immediate proximity.

=== Sultan Tipu Shaheed ===
- Motto: Latin: Fortis in proelio (Firm in combat)
- House colour: Green

Sultan Tipu Shaheed House (STS House) was named after the innovative ruler and the Tiger of Mysore, Tipu Sultan (1750–1799). Its logo has a lion's head with a spear and a sword crossed in the background. It values steadfastness, valour, fearlessness and resourcefulness. STS House was constructed from 1985 to 1991. It has the capacity to accommodate more than 150 students. It was initially only for day scholars, however it was later reorganized to evenly distribute boarders and day scholars in all the houses.

=== Sher Khan Shaheed ===
- Motto: Latin: Pro honore (Die for honour)
- House colour: Orange

Sher Khan Shaheed House (SKS House) was named after the Lion of Kargil, Captain Karnal Sher Khan NH (1970–1999). Taking into consideration his devotion, commitment, determination and heroism, this house was named after him. The highest military award of Pakistan, the Nishan-e-Haider, is illustrated in its logo. SKS House consists of two blocks: SKS-A and SKS-B. It was inaugurated by an old Hallian, the then Chairman Board of Governors Army Burn Hall Institutions and the then Commander X Corps, Lt Gen Khalid Nawaz Khan HI(M), Sitara-e-Esar on 25 November 2011. SKS House is a three-storey building with the capacity to accommodate more than 170 students.

== Activities ==
At Burn Hall, there are many organizations known as 'clubs' or 'societies' in which students come together to pursue their common interests. Each is headed by a president, who is assisted by a vice president, a secretary and a joint secretary; these positions are mostly occupied by senior pupils. One or more teachers are placed in charge of each organization and sports team. At any time there are dozens of such associations in existence, catering for a wide range of interests and largely run by boys. Many of these have been in existence for decades while others tend to come and go:

- Alumni Association / Old Hallians' Community
- Biology Club
- Burn Hall Model United Nations (BHMUN)
- Chemistry Club
- Computer Club
- Drama Club – theatrical, musical and terpsichorean performances, competitions and social nights
- English Literary Society, and Urdu Bazm-i Adab (Urdu: بزمِ ادب, lit. 'assembly on literature') – jointly organize the annual All-Pakistan Burn Hall Bilingual Declamation Contest
- Fine Art Club – also assists the Drama Club with the visual elements of set design, costumes and props
- Gymnastics, or Athletics, Club
- Horse Riding Club – equestrian
- Judo and Karate Club – martial arts
- Music Club – runs as a wing of the Drama Club
- Photography Club
- Physics Club – formerly "Electronics Club"

Many of these put exhibitions on display, particularly for the annual prize distribution ceremony, whose guest of honour is a personality, like a general of the armed forces or the president of Pakistan.

== Gallery ==
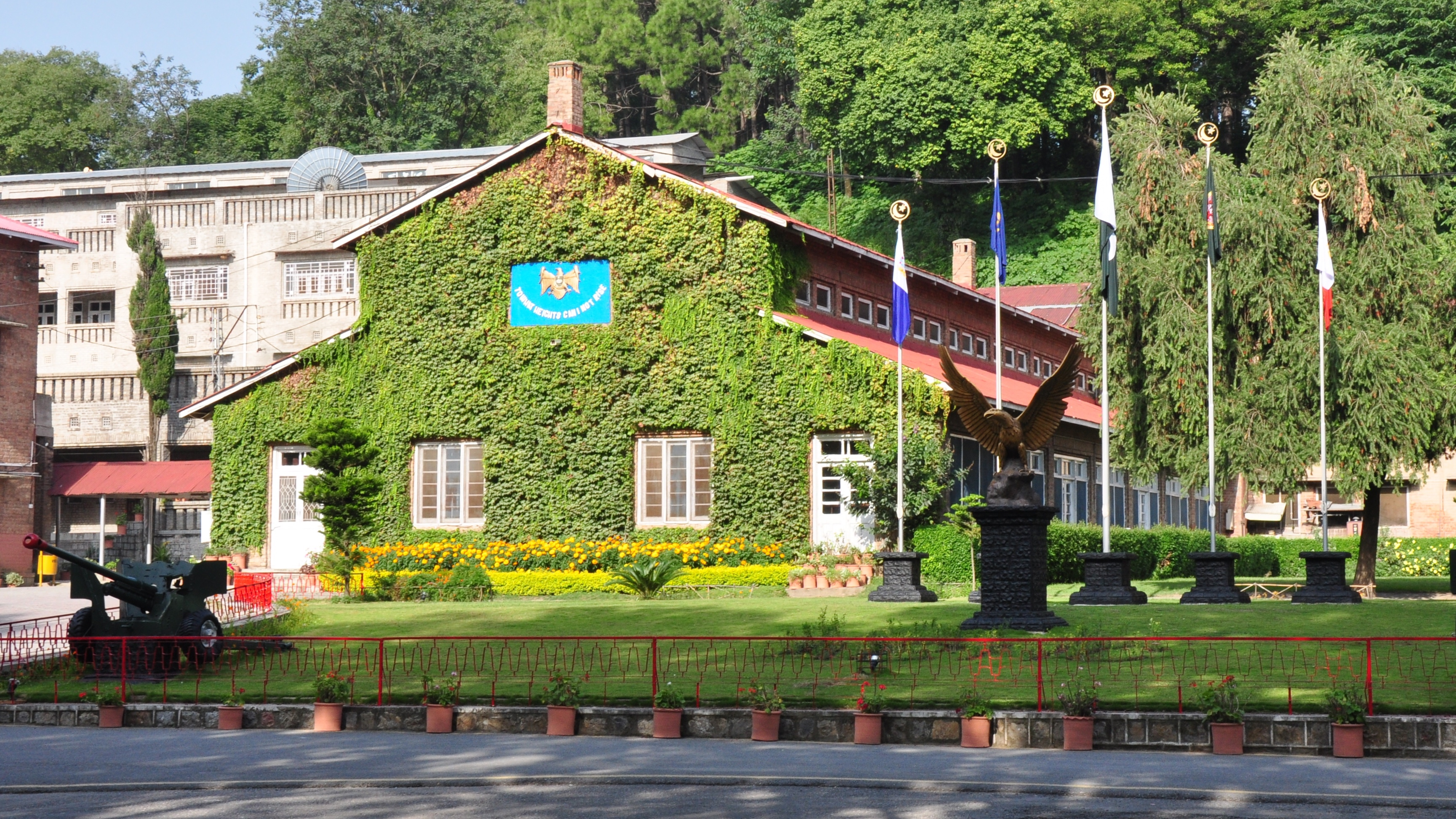
College Mess (2010)

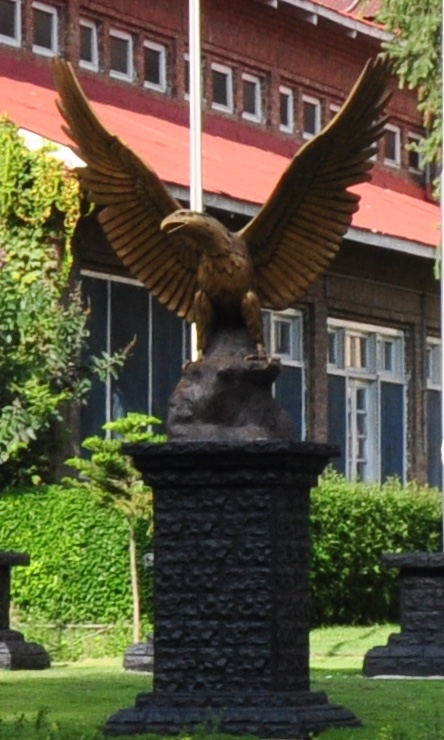
Sculpture of Burn Hall's mascot - golden eagle

== See also ==
- List of postage stamps of Pakistan from 1987 to 1996
- List of postage stamps of Pakistan from 2017 to present
