= Pakistan Technology Evaluation Satellite =

Remote sensing satellite

PakTES-1A
- Mission type: Earth observation
- Operator: SUPARCO
- COSPAR ID: 2018-056A
- SATCAT no.: 43529

Spacecraft properties
- Manufacturer: Space Advisory Company, South Africa; SUPARCO
- Launch mass: 300 kg (660 lb)

Start of mission
- Launch date: 9 July 2018
- Rocket: Long March 2C
- Launch site: Jiuquan Satellite Launch Centre
- Contractor: CNSA

Orbital parameters
- Reference system: Geocentric
- Perigee altitude: 549.2 km (341.3 mi)
- Apogee altitude: 632.5 km (393.0 mi)
- Inclination: 98 degrees
- Period: 96.8 minutes

Pakistan Technology Evaluation Satellite (PakTES-1A) is an indigenously developed remote sensing satellite of Pakistan's Space and Upper Atmosphere Research Commission. It was developed by SUPARCO and its payload manufacturing was subcontracted to South Africa's Space Advisory Company. It has 300 Kilogram Mass. It was launched on board a Chinese Long March 2C rocket on 9 July 2018 to operate at an altitude of 610 kilometres (380 mi) from the Earth.

== See also ==
- Pakistan Remote Sensing Satellite
- SUPARCO
