= PRSS-1 =

Pakistani Earth observation satellite

- Mission type: Earth observation satellite Geographic information systems
- Operator: SUPARCO
- COSPAR ID: 2018-056B
- SATCAT no.: 43530
- Website: http://prss.pk

Spacecraft properties
- Manufacturer: DFH Satellite Co. Ltd.
- Power: 600 watts

Start of mission
- Launch date: 9 July 2018, 03:56:10 UTC
- Rocket: Long March 2C
- Launch site: Jiuquan Satellite Launch Center
- Contractor: China

Orbital parameters
- Reference system: Geocentric orbit
- Regime: Low Earth orbit
- Altitude: 700 km
- Inclination: 38.280°
- Period: 99.31 minutes

The Pakistan Remote Sensing Satellite-1 (PRSS-1), is a Pakistani earth observation optical satellite launched from China's Jiuquan Satellite Centre on 9 July 2018.

== History ==
After the successful launch and operation of Badr satellite programme which contained the experimental Low Earth Observational satellites in the 1990s and early 2000s, SUPARCO launched the work on the high resolution Remote Sensing Satellite to meet the national and international user requirements in the field of satellite imagery.

The PRSS program was planned to be a progressive and sustainable program with an initial plan to launch an optical satellite with payload of 2.5 metre PAN in 700 km Sun-synchronous orbit by the end of year 2014, which will be followed by a series of optical and SAR satellites. Necessary infrastructure for ground control, image reception and processing was also planned to be set up.

According to SUPARCO, the first satellite of this program was launched in 2018, envisioned to provide help in exploiting the potentials of space technologies for natural resource surveying and environmental purpose.

== Launch date ==
On 9 July 2018 at 03:56:10 UTC, China successfully launched two remote sensing satellites for Pakistan, which were launched to monitor progress as they build the China–Pakistan Economic Corridor, an extensive multibillion-dollar infrastructure development project between the two nations. The satellites were named PRSS-1 and PakTES-1A, and were launched from the Jiuquan Satellite Launch Center in northwest China using a Long March 2C launch vehicle. The PRSS-1 is China's first optical remote sensing satellite sold to Pakistan. It is the 17th satellite developed by the China Academy of Space Technology for an overseas buyer, while PakTES-1A is an experimental satellite developed by Space & Upper Atmosphere Research Commission (SUPARCO).
