= World Population Day =

Annual UN event since 1987 focused on population issues

- Date: July 11
- Next time: 11 July 2027
- Frequency: Annual
- Related to: When the population of the world reached 5 billion in the year 1987

Distribution of global population increase in 2016

World Population Day is an annual event, observed on July 11 every year, which seeks to raise awareness of global population issues. The event was established by the Governing Council of the United Nations Development Programme in 1989. It was inspired by the public interest in Five Billion Day on July 11, 1987, the approximate date on which the world's population reached five billion people. World Population Day aims to increase people's awareness on various population issues such as the importance of family planning, gender equality, poverty, maternal health and human rights.

The day was suggested by Dr. K.C.Zachariah in which population reached five billion when he worked as Sr Demographer at World Bank. While press interest and general awareness in the global population surges at the increments of whole billions of people, the world population increases by 100 million approximately every 14 months. The world population was estimated at 7,400,000,000 on February 6, 2016 and reached 7,500,000,000 on April 24, 2017. The world population hit 7,700,000,000 in 2019.

In November 2020, UNFPA, together with the governments of Kenya and Denmark, convened a high-level conference in Nairobi to accelerate efforts to achieve these unmet goals. On World Population Day, advocates from around the world call on leaders, policymakers, grassroots organizers, institutions and others to help make reproductive health and rights a reality for all. Recently, the global population passed 8 billion on November 15, 2022.

== See also ==
- Agricultural effects and population limits from peak oil
- List of countries and dependencies by population
- List of population concern organizations
- Human overpopulation
- Negative Population Growth
- United Nations Population Fund
- The Revenge of Gaia
