= Philippine space program =

Space program of the Philippines

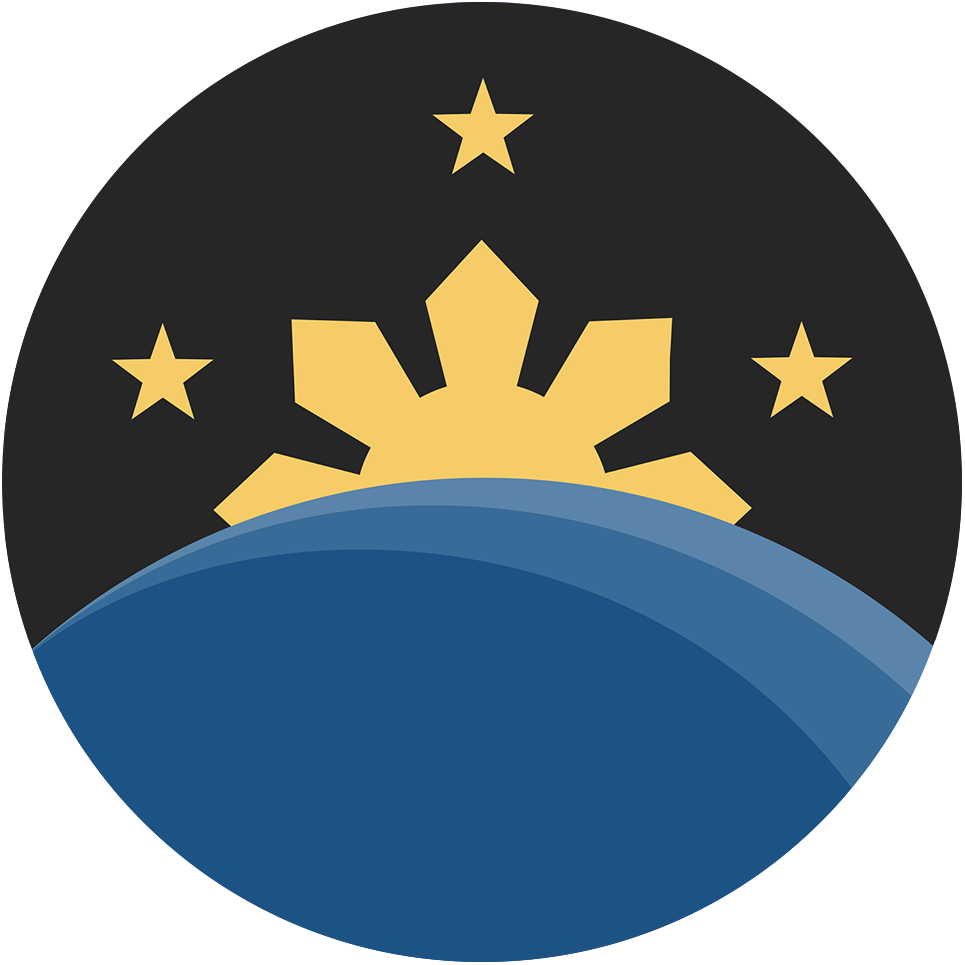
The Philippine Space Agency is responsible for the Philippines' space program

The space program of the Philippines is currently maintained by the Philippine Space Agency (PhilSA) together with various agencies under the Department of Science and Technology (DOST). The space program includes space research and development, and is funded through the National SPACE Development Program (NSDP) by the DOST and received an initial budget of ₱1 billion in 2020.

The Philippines attempted to establish a formal space program in the 1960s, during the term of President Ferdinand Marcos. A joint-program with the United States was proposed for the purpose of monitoring typhoons in Asia. However such plans did not push through. The Philippine Communications Satellite was established in the same decade which provided satellite communications in Asia.

Development continued in the late 80s led by the private sector, with the country's first satellites, Agila-1 which was originally launched as an Indonesian satellite. A decade later, the Mabuhay Satellite Corporation entered into service Agila-2, the first Filipino-owned satellite to be launched to space, which deployed into orbit by Chinese Chang Zheng 3B rocket and was launched from the Xichang Satellite Launch Center in the Sichuan province on 20 August 1997.

It would be almost two decades before the Philippines would launch another satellite into space when government scientists from DOST and researchers from the University of the Philippines partnered with the Tohoku and Hokkaido Universities of Japan under the PHL-microsat program to launch Diwata-1, the first microsatellite designed and constructed by Filipinos and was deployed into orbit on from the International Space Station (ISS) on April 27, 2016. The Philippines in cooperation with foreign space agencies such as NASA of the United States and JAXA of Japan were able to deploy develop and launch two additional small-scale satellites, Diwata-2 and Maya-1, with plans to launch additional satellites by 2022.

The Philippine space program was largely decentralized until the establishment of the Philippine Space Agency in 2019.

== History ==
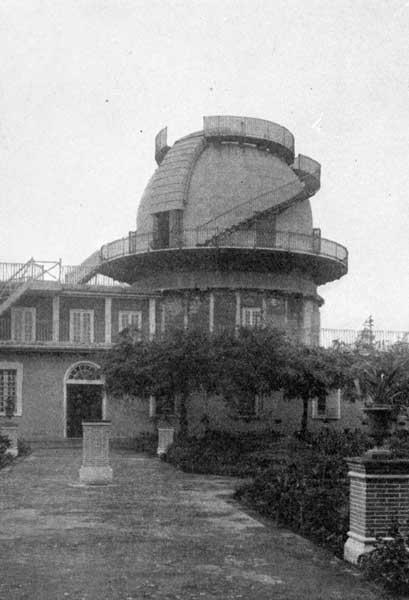
The Manila Observatory in 1923

=== Origins ===
The Manila Observatory was established during the Spanish colonial period in 1865 and was the only formal meteorological and astronomical research and services institution in the Philippines and remained so until the creation of the Philippine Atmospheric, Geophysical and Astronomical Services Administration (PAGASA) in 1972.

=== Marcos era ===
Efforts to establish a Philippine space program started as early as the 1960s, when the government built an Earth satellite receiving station. US President Lyndon Johnson discussed with then-Philippine President Ferdinand Marcos in 1966 about the possibility of establishing a joint US–Philippine space program to monitor storms in Asia. If such plans had pushed through it would have been the first time Asians would have gotten involved in space activities.

The Philippine Communications Satellite (Philcomsat) was established within the same decade when the Marcos government built an Earth satellite receiving station. Philcomsat was a founding member of Intelsat, an international satellite consortium. It also had an exclusive franchise for satellite communication in Southeast Asia, as well as in Korea and Japan. It was also responsible for providing the equipment which enabled people in Asia to watch the Apollo 11 launch, which took place on July 16, 1969. The wholly government-owned company became a private corporation in 1982. Marcos also by the virtue of Presidential Decree No. 286 created the Philippine Aerospace Development Corporation (PADC) a Philippine state owned aerospace and defense technology corporation attached to the Department of National Defense, to establish a "reliable aviation and aerospace industry" in the Philippines, design, manufacture and sell "all forms" of aircraft, as well as to develop indigenous capabilities in the maintenance, repair, and modification of aviation equipment.

On April 23, 1980, the Philippines became one of the initial 11 signatories to the Moon Treaty.

=== PASI and Mabuhay's satellite ventures ===
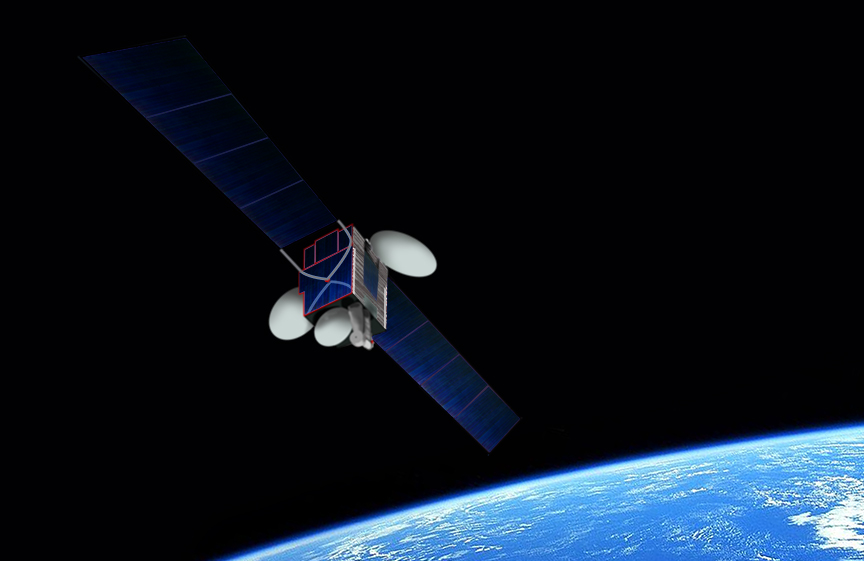
Agila-2, the first launched satellite of the Philippines. The satellite now operates as ABS-3.

In 1974, the Philippines planned to use satellites to improve communications. The leasing of satellites from Intelsat was considered but it was later decided to lease capacity from the Indonesian Palapa system. There were interests for a national communication satellite but initiatives to obtain one did not start until 1994, when the Philippine Agila Satellite Inc. (PASI), a consortium of 17 companies, was established to operate and purchase domestic satellites.

The Mabuhay Satellite Corporation (MSC), another consortium, was formed in the same year by PLDT, which was a former member of PASI. PLDT was the largest member of PASI before its departure from the consortium. MSC was composed of numerous domestic telecommunications and broadcasting companies, along with Indonesia-based Pasifik Satelit Nusantara and China-based Everbright Group.

Then, President Fidel V. Ramos expressed his desire for a Philippine satellite to be in orbit in time for the APEC Summit to be held in the country in November 1996.

MSC complied with the acquisition of Indonesian satellite Palapa B-2P from Pasifik Satelit Nusantara. The satellite was moved to a new orbital slot on August 1, 1996. The satellite was renamed Agila-1 and became the first satellite in orbit to be owned by the country.

MSC launched the country's second satellite, Agila-2, with the assistance of China. The communications satellite was launched through the Long March 3B at the Xichang Satellite Launch Center on August 19, 1997. The satellite was acquired by Asia Broadcast Satellite in 2011 and was renamed to ABS-3.

=== PHL-Microsat and Birds-2 programs ===
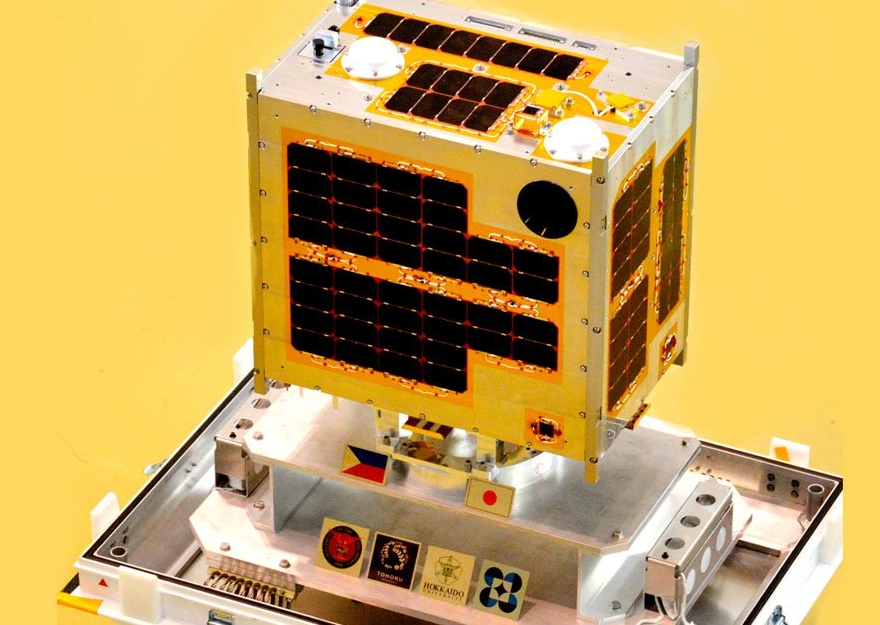
Diwata-1 on display before launch.

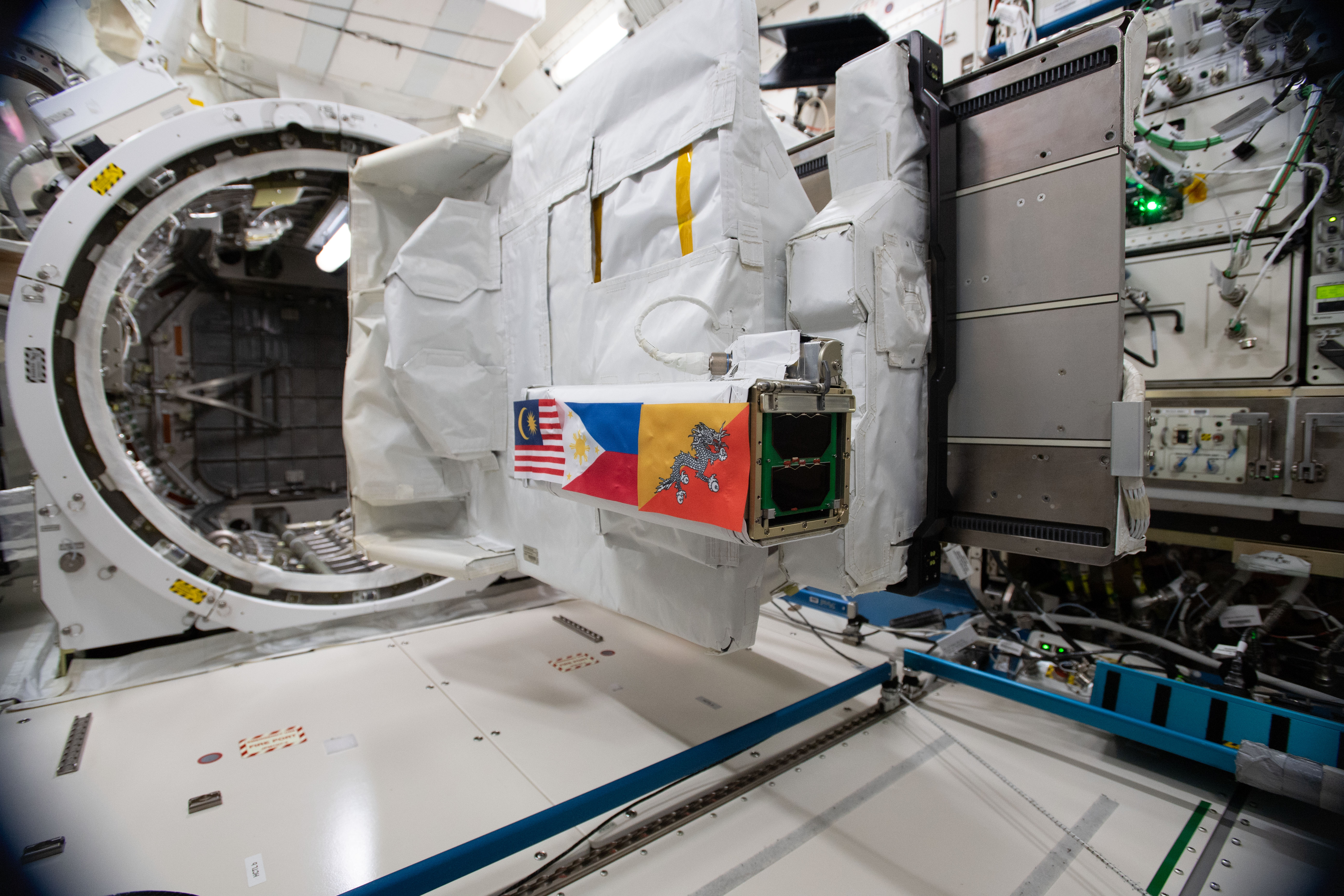
Maya-1 inside the ISS prior to deployment.

The DOST initiated the Philippine Scientific Earth Observation Microsatellite (PHL-Microsat) program to send two microsatellites in 2016 and 2017. The effort is part of the country's disaster risk management program. A receiving station will also be built in the country. The efforts were part of a bigger project, together with seven other Asian countries aside from Japan and the Philippines, to create a network of about 50 microsatellites.

The first satellite under the PHL-Microsat program Diwata-1, the first satellite designed and assembled by Filipinos, with cooperation from Hokkaido University and Tohoku University. One of the major goals of the PHL-Microsat program is to boost the progress on the creation of the Philippine Space Agency. The satellite was deployed from the International Space Station on April 27, 2016. This satellite was succeeded on October 29, 2018, by Diwata-2, which was launched directly into orbit from the Tanegashima Space Center in Japan.

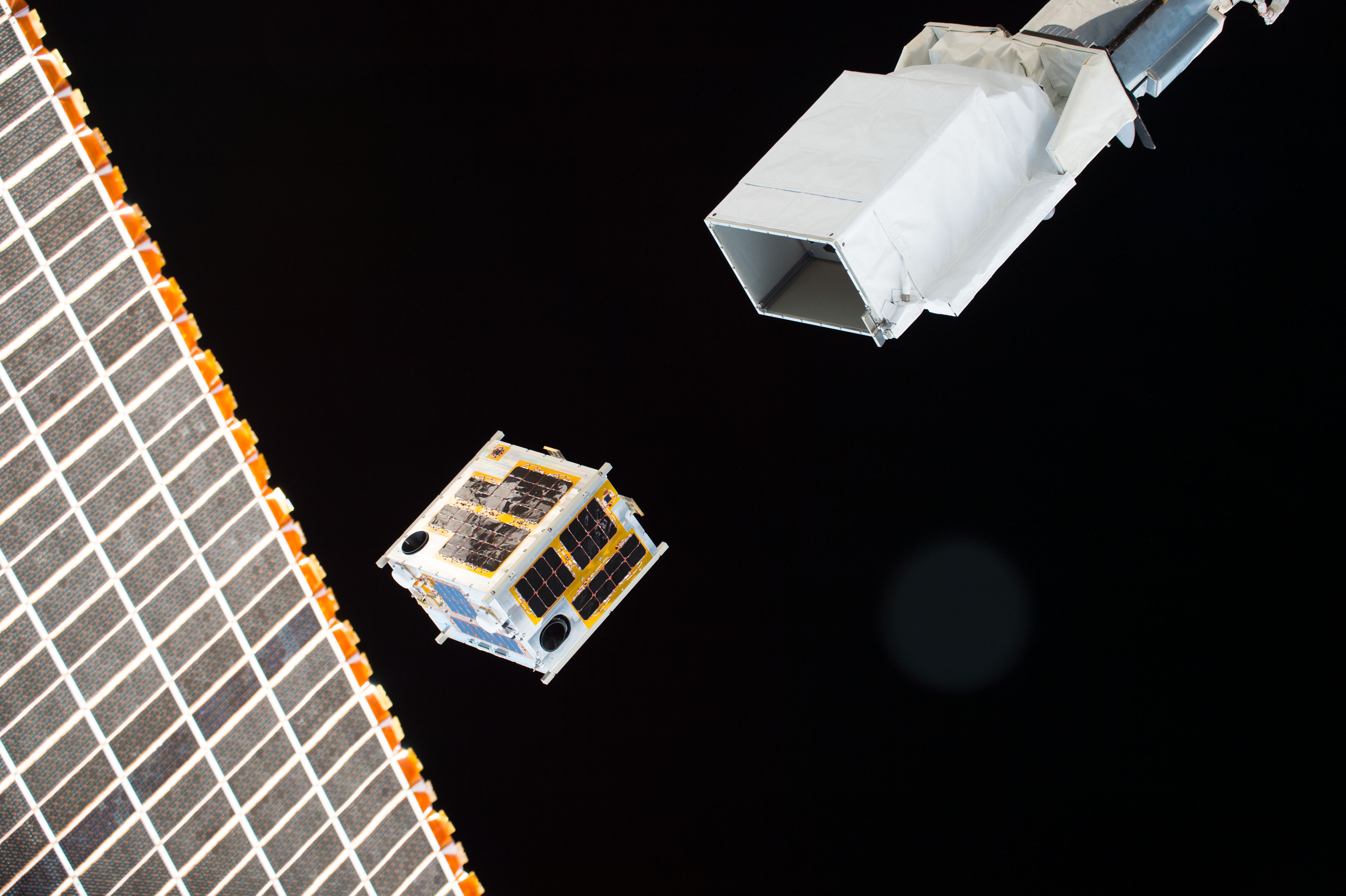
Diwata-1 Microsatellite being deployed from the ISS

The first nanosatellite under the Birds-2 program, Maya-1 was also deployed from the ISS in the Japanese Kibo module along with two other satellites from Bhutan and Malaysia on August 10, 2018.

=== Creation of the Philippine Space Agency (PhilSA) ===
Despite these advancements, the country's space program still faced two primary challenges: insufficient funding and the lack of a centralized space agency. In the absence of a formal space agency, the DOST funded the National Space Development Program to set up the foundations of a future space agency.

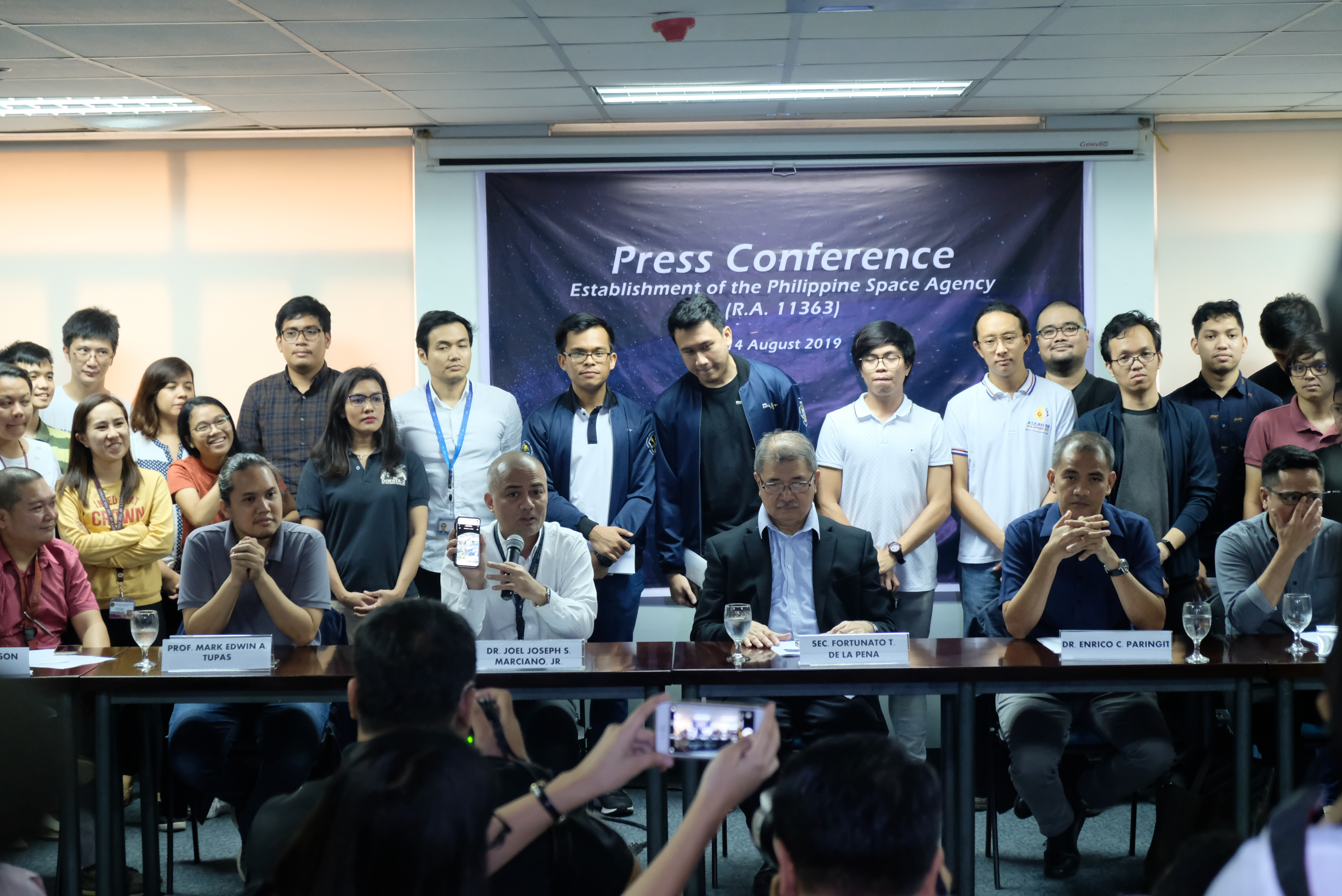
Press conference announcing the establishment of the Philippine Space Agency.

President Rodrigo Duterte in February 2018 announced that a precursor to a space agency, the National Space Development Office, will be established. As of March 2018, there are seven pending bills in both the House of Representatives and the Senate seeking to establish the Philippine Space Agency (PhilSA). In the meantime, the DOST has agreed with the Russian space agency Roscosmos, "to proceed with negotiations of an intergovernmental framework agreement on space cooperation that will include use of Russian rockets to launch Philippine payloads such as micro-and nano-satellites as well as the establishment of a receiving station for the Global Navigation Satellite System" (GLONASS), Russia's alternative to American Global Positioning System (GPS)

In late January 2019, the Department of Science and Technology has said that the Philippines is already capable of founding its own space agency with a pending bill already passed in the House of Representatives and pending counterpart legislation already pending in the Senate. By this time since 2010, the science department has already spent ₱7.48 billion (or $144 million) for space research and development, aided 5,500 scholars, trained more than 1,000 space science experts, and established 25 facilities in various parts of the Philippines.

The Philippine Space Agency was established when the "Philippine Space Act" (Republic Act 11363) was signed into law by Pres. Duterte on 8 August 2019. The first head of Philippine Space Agency, Joel Marciano Jr. was appointed on December 5, 2019, by President Duterte. The agency is currently focused on developing additional micro and nano-satellites and has not discounted developing rocket launch capability in the long term. The satellite program of the DOST will also transition into the PhilSA's authority.

Maya-2, a nanosatellite under the Birds-4 program, was successfully launched on February 21, 2021.

== Organization ==
Department of Science and Technology was responsible for a majority of space research conducted.

Prior to the creation of the PhilSA, several government agencies under the DOST ran the country's space program: namely, the

- Philippine Atmospheric, Geophysical and Astronomical Services Administration (PAGASA),
- National Mapping and Resource Information Authority (NAMRIA), and
- National Disaster Risk Reduction and Management Council (NDRRMC).

The DOST and the Manila Observatory crafted a 10-year masterplan in 2012 to make the Philippines a "space-capable country" by 2022. New programs and future space missions will be directed by the newly created Philippine Space Agency (PhilSA).

== Spaceport ==
The Philippines does not have a spaceport. In January 2022, Senators Manny Pacquiao and Koko Pimentel met with representatives of SpaceX and discussed the possibility of setting up a launch pad in Mindanao due to its proximity to the equator. Mati, Davao Oriental has been proposed by the Ateneo de Davao University as early as 2019 to be a potential site for a spaceport. PhilSa is still examining proposals for a launch site in Mati as of late 2021.

== Space Education ==
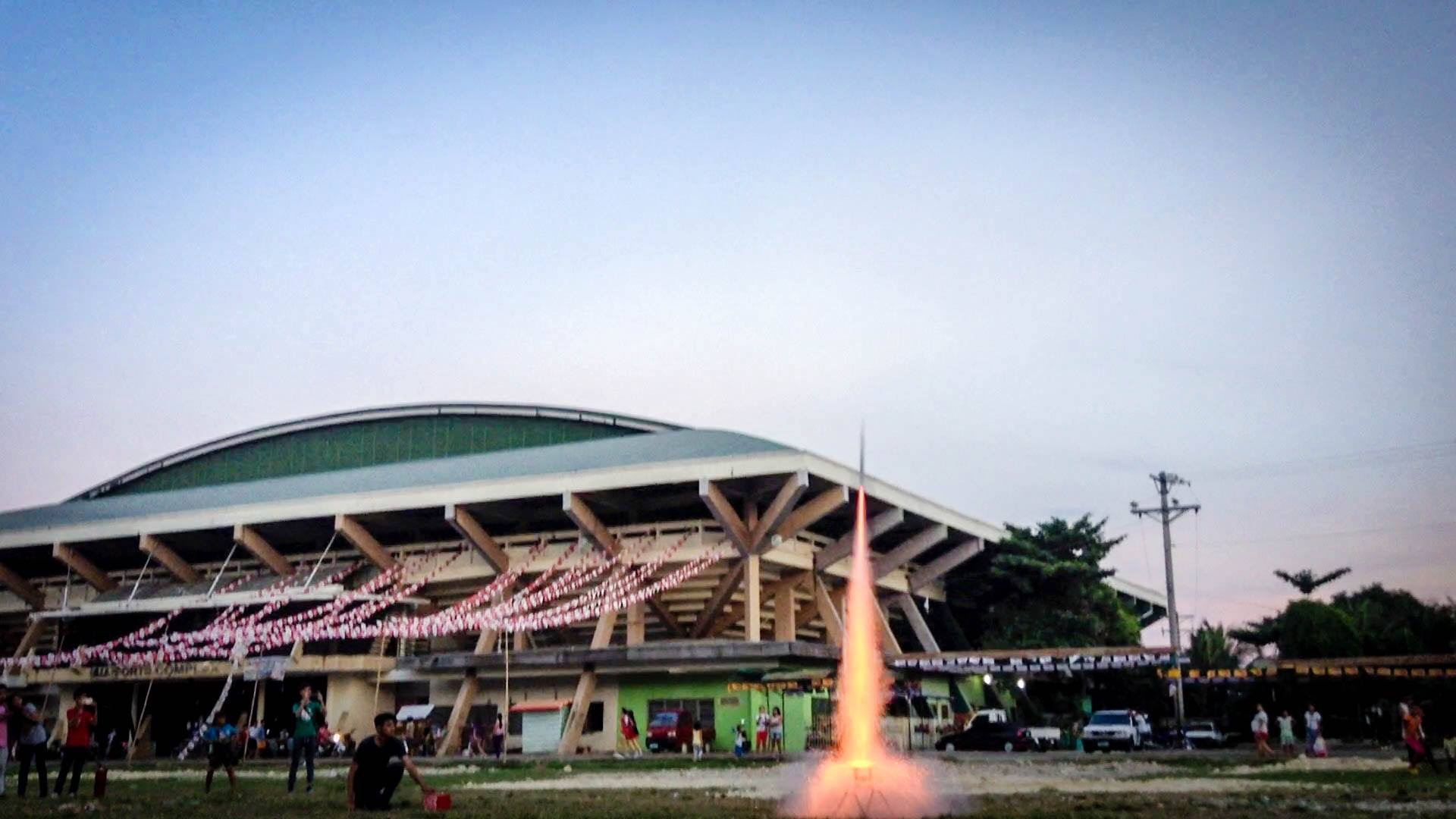
A model rocket launch from Minglanilla, Cebu, Philippines

The Department of Science and Technology–Science Education Institute (DOST-SEI) launched the first Philippine Space Science Education Program (PESSAP) in 2004, to promote science and technology, particularly space science, as a field of study to the Filipino youth.

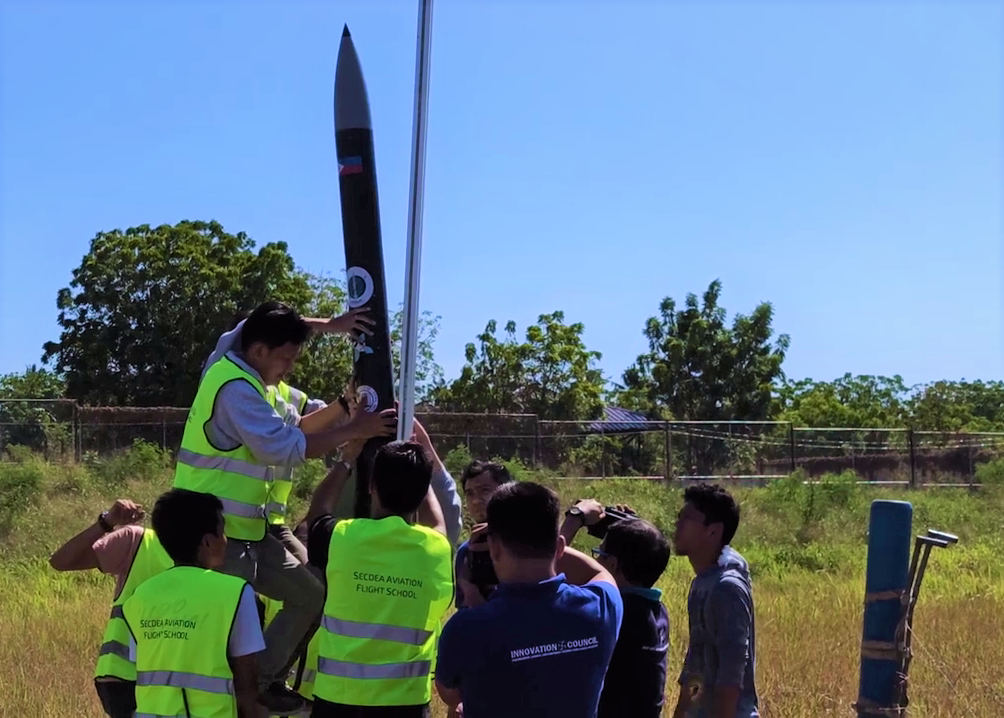
The Tala Hybrid Rocket is being prepared for launch at Mati Airport, Davao Oriental, Philippines

On October 5, 2017, high school students from St. Cecilia's College-Cebu, Inc. launched 3-feet solid propellant Model rockets for the World Space Week 2017 celebration in Cebu City. The same team was awarded a research grant by the Department of Science and Technology - Philippine Council for Industry, Energy and Emerging Technology Research and Development (DOST-PCIEERD) in 2018 to design and develop the TALA hybrid rocket which can propel a can satellite 5 kilometres (3.1 mi) into the atmosphere. TALA, the first high-powered hybrid rocket developed in the Philippines successfully lifted off at 11:57 AM Saturday from Crow Valley Gunnery Range, Capas, Tarlac. It was able to deploy its Can Satellite payload before going into fast descent and eventual deployment of its main parachute for safe landing.

The PHL-Microsat program offers a graduate program called Space Science and Tech Proliferation through Partnerships (Stepup).

Student-researchers and science faculty from St. Cecilia's College - Cebu, Inc. in partnership with Department of Science and Technology-Philippine Council for Industry, Energy and Emerging Technology Research and Development (DOST-PCIEERD) successfully launched the first High-Altitude Balloon Life Support System "Karunungan" (HAB LSS Karunungan) in May 2018 at Minglanilla, Cebu, Philippines and floated above the Armstrong Line to simulate 'space like' conditions for future space flights.

== Contemporary Private Ventures ==
In 2019, Orbital Exploration (OrbitX), a private firm was set up which aims to research on the usage as biofuel like algae to propel space launch vehicles. The company also plans to develop its own "reusable" payload launch vehicle named "Haribon SLS-1".

== Gallery ==
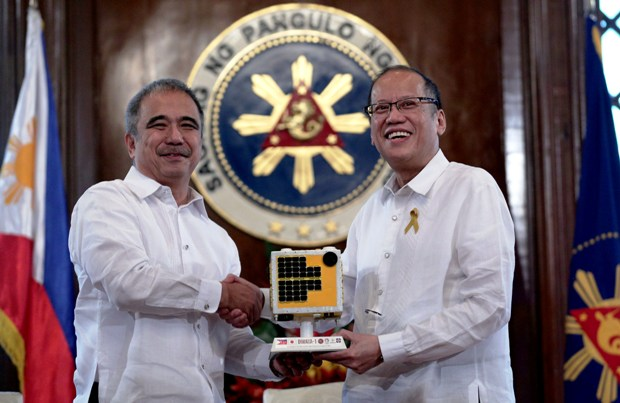

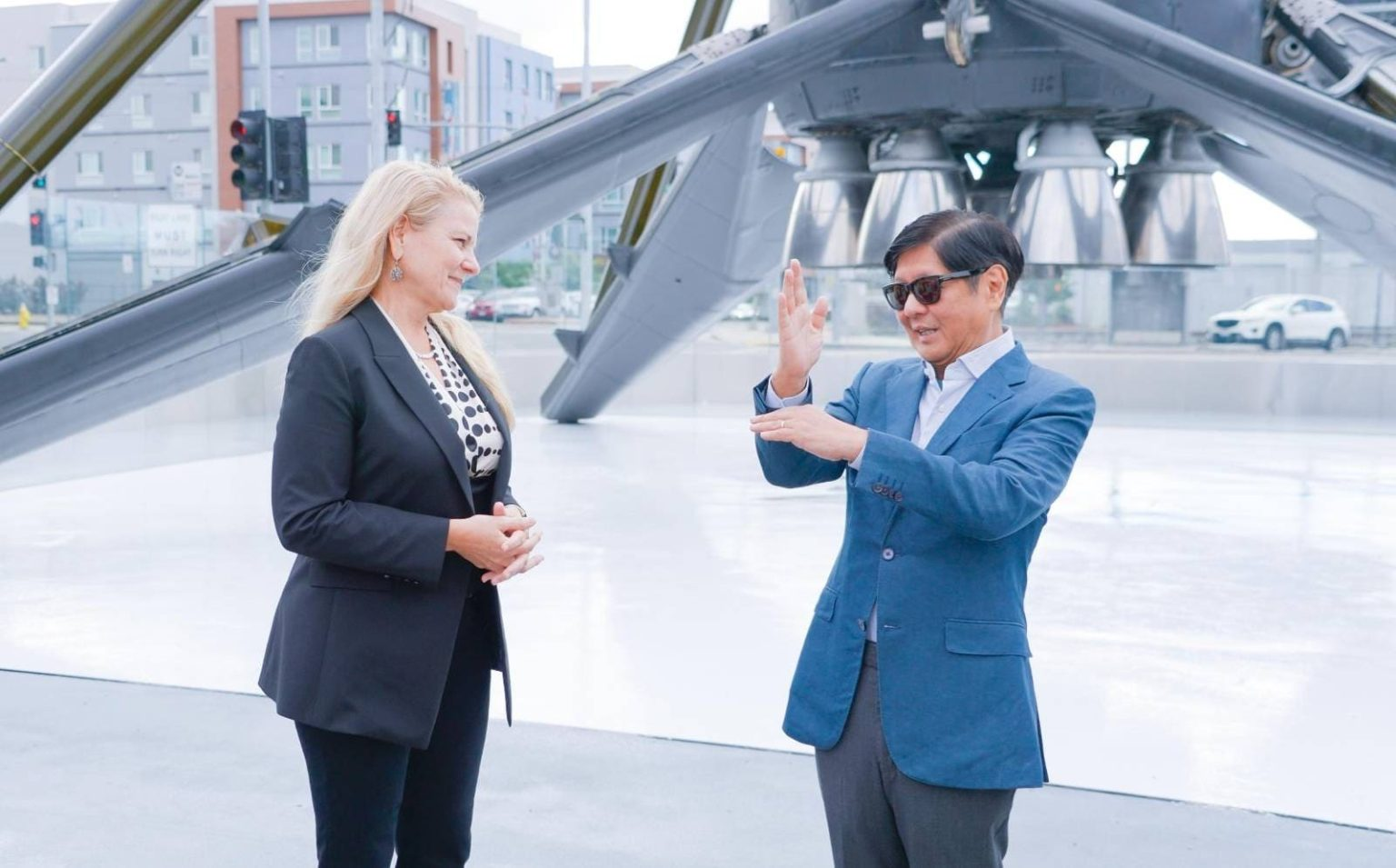
President Bongbong Marcos with SpaceX President and Chief Operating Officer Gwynne Shotwell

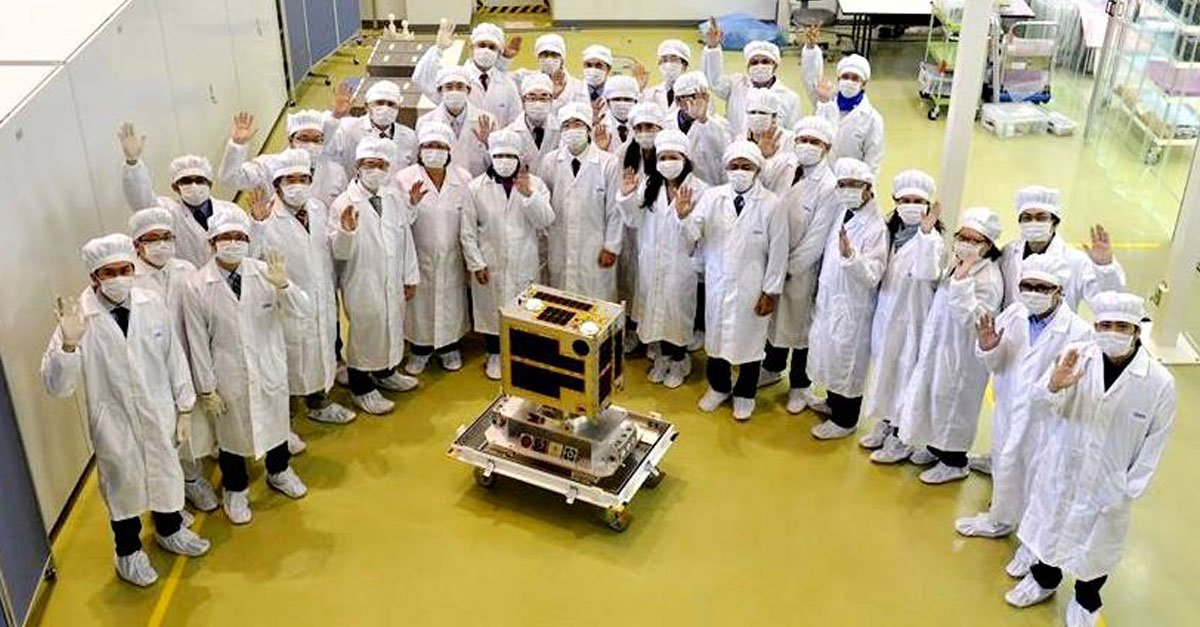

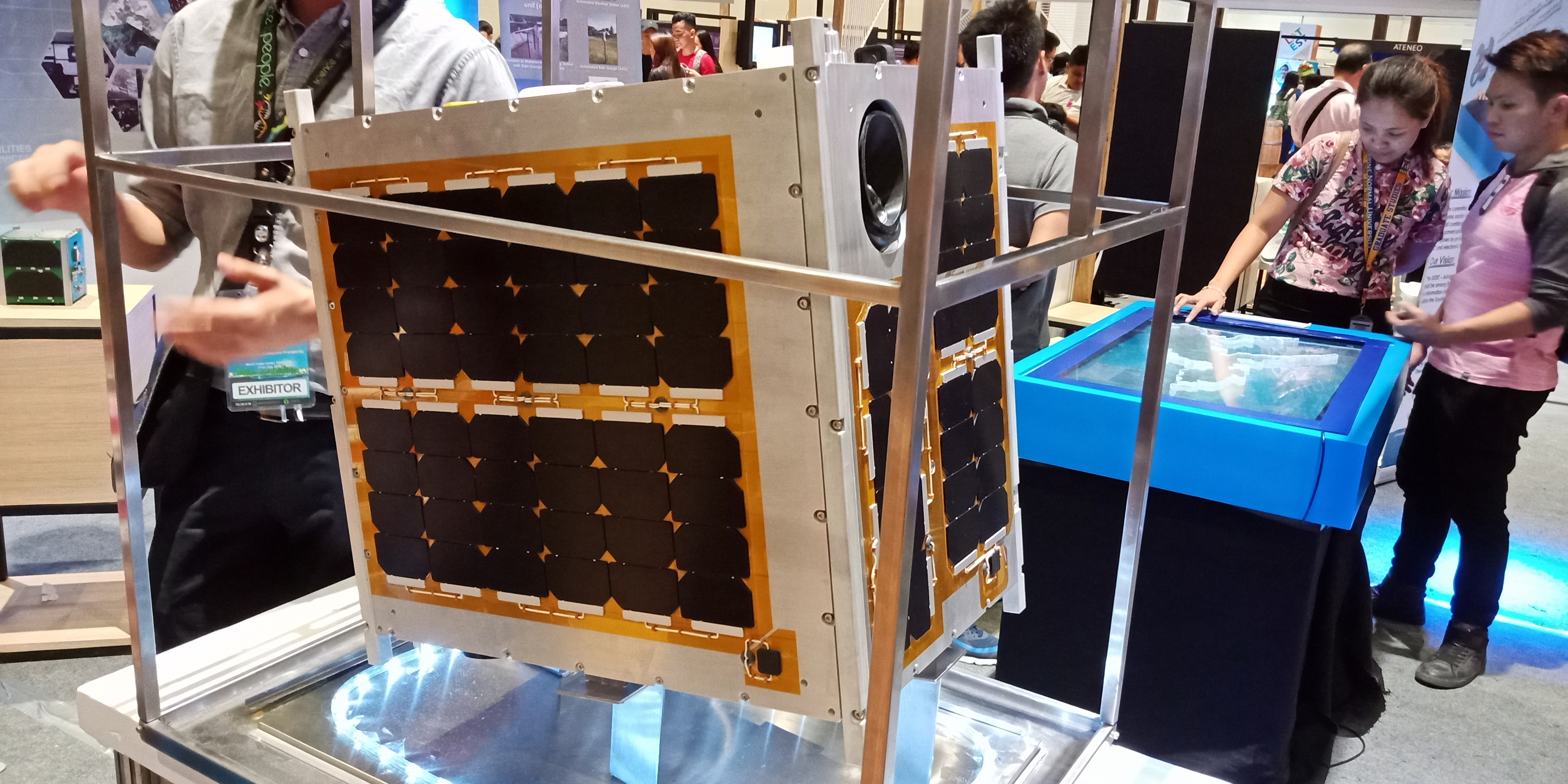

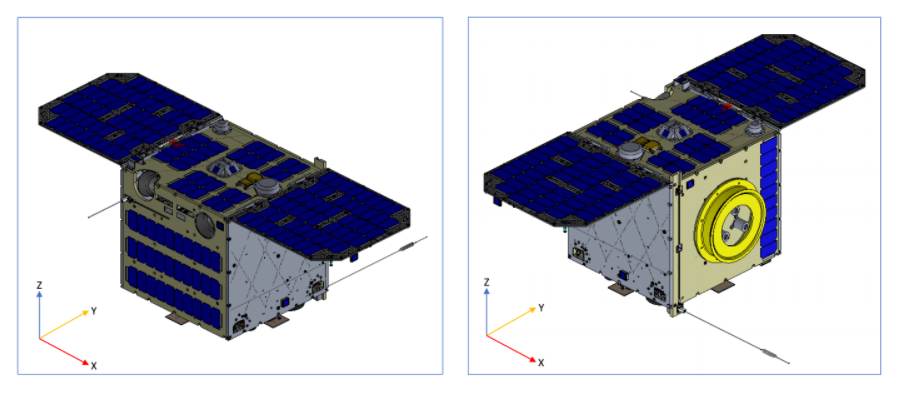

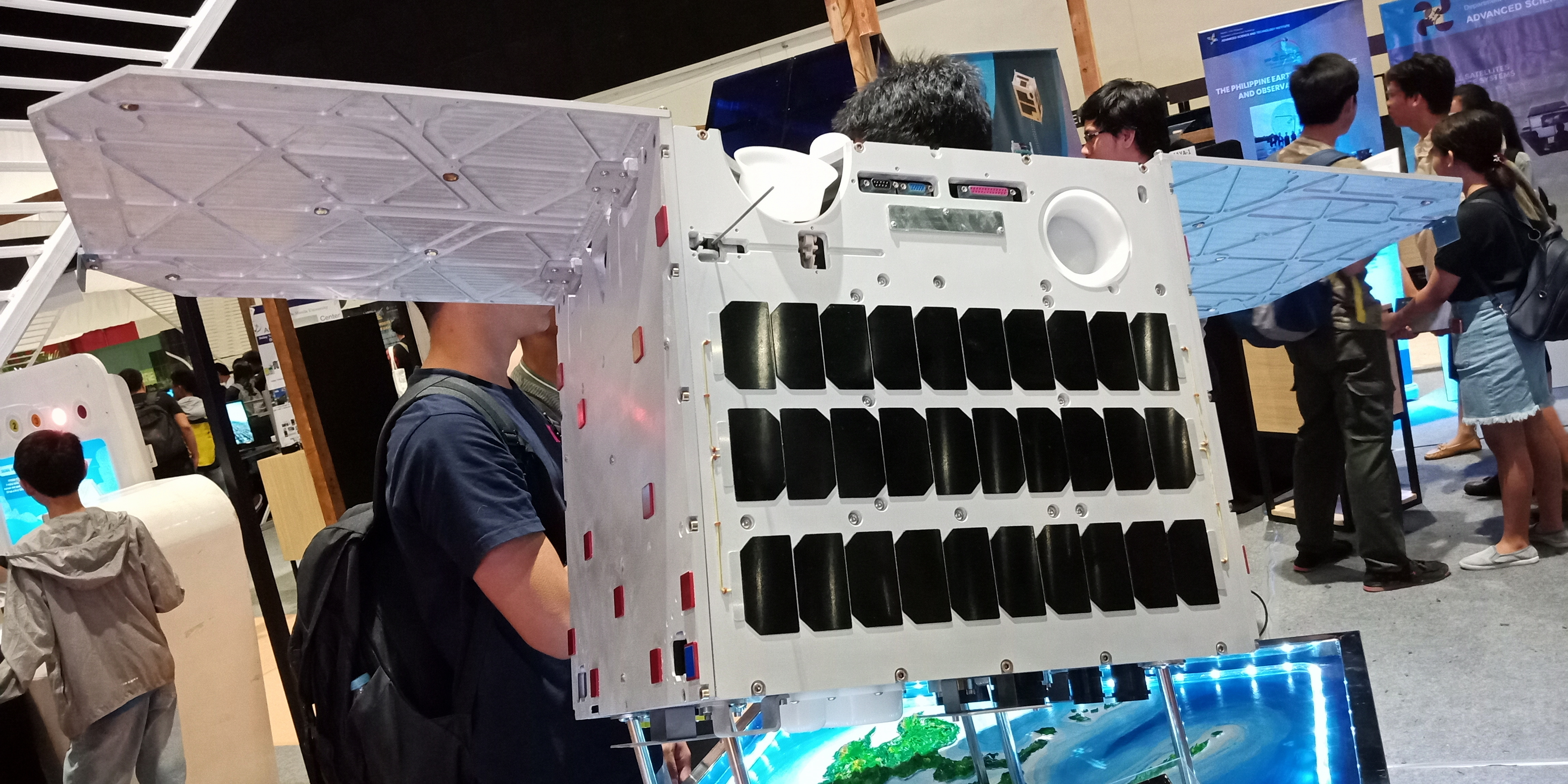

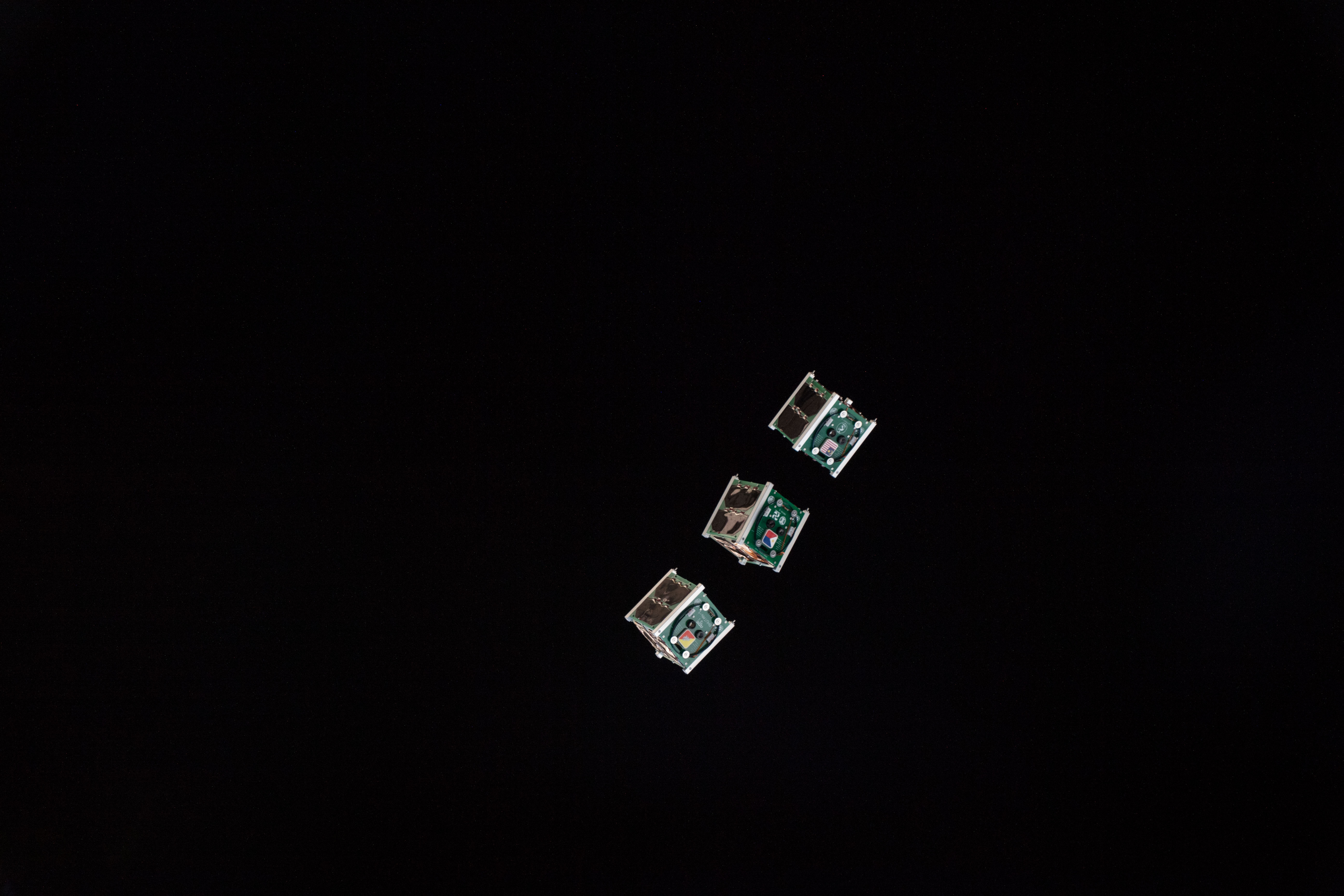

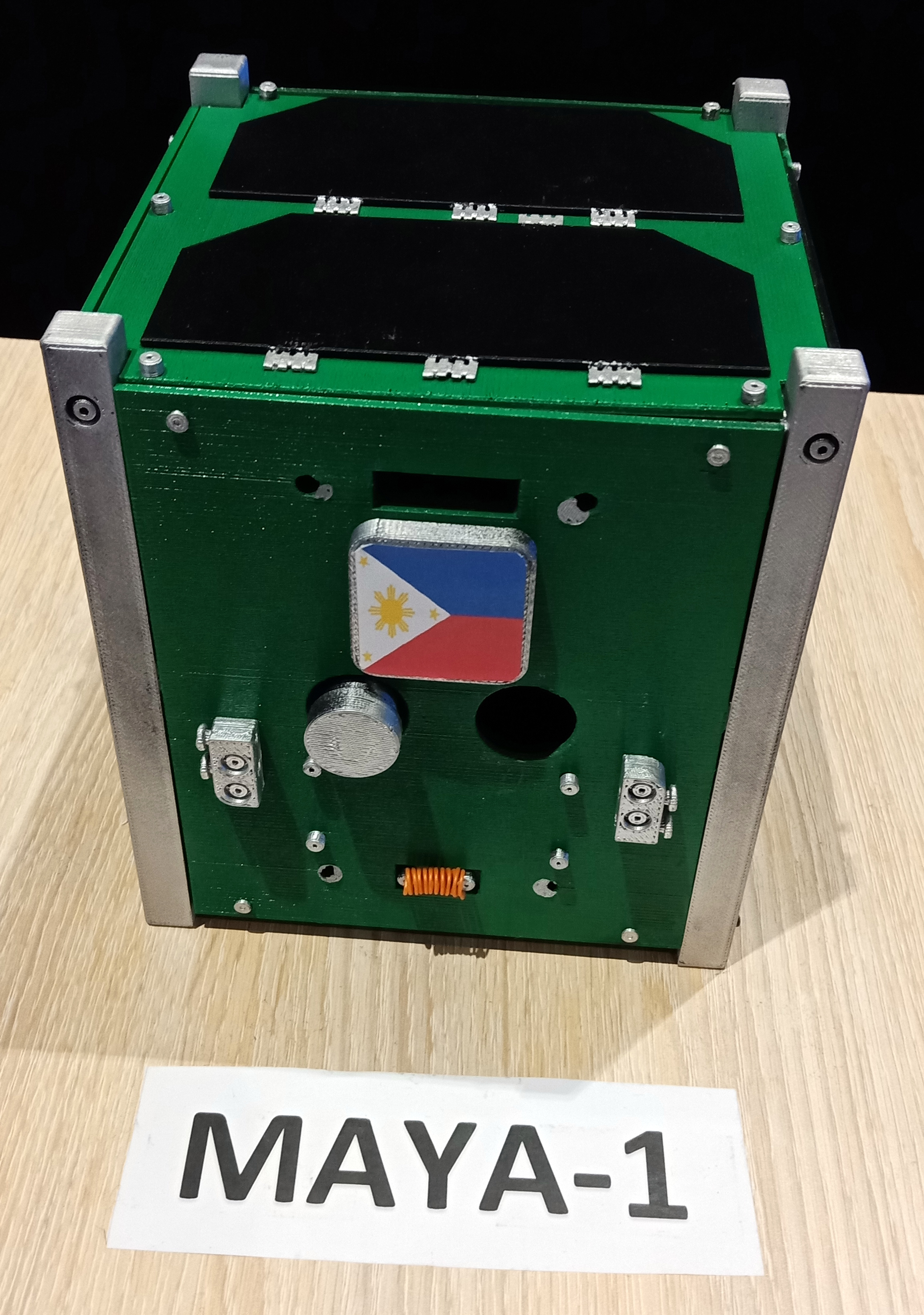

== See also ==
- Philippine Space Agency (PhilSA)
- National SPACE Development Program (NSDP)
- Philippine Scientific Earth Observation Microsatellite (PHL-Microsat)
- Birds-2
