= STAMINA4Space =

Philippine space technology program

Program overview
- Country: Philippines / Japan
- Organization: Department of Science and Technology; University of the Philippines
- Purpose: CubeSat development and operation / Local technology capability building
- Status: Ongoing

Program history
- Duration: 2018–
- Successes: 2

The Space Technology and Applications Mastery, Innovation and Advancement (abbreviated and stylized as STAMINA4Space) is a space technology program by the Philippine government. It is considered as the successor program to the Philippine Scientific Earth Observation Microsatellite (PHL-Microsat) program, a cooperation between the Philippine government and Japanese universities to develop microsatellites. The program is funded under the Department of Science and Technology.

It aims to use the results from the PHL-Microsat program to further research and develop small satellite technology capability in the country.

STAMINA4Space Program officially succeeded the PHL-Microsat program in August 2018, inheriting two satellites, Diwata-1 and Diwata-2 and the CubeSat Maya-1.

== Sub-projects ==
The project is divided into five sub-projects.

Project No.	Name	Abbreviation	Objective
1	Optical Payload Technology, In-depth Knowledge Acquisition, and Localization	OPTIKAL	Development of a scientific and operational optical payload primarily for agricultural monitoring.
2	The Building PHL-50: Localizing the Diwata-1, 2 Bus System as the Country's Space Heritage 50 kg Microsatellite Bus	PHL-50	Development of reference bus platform from Diwata-1 and Diwata-2.
3	Space Science and Technology Proliferation through University Partnerships	STeP-UP	Derive learnings from the PHL-Microsat program and collaboration with the academe, industry players, and government agencies.
4	Ground Receiving, Archiving, Science Product Development and Distribution	GRASPED	Systematic operations of the Diwata microsatellites
5	Advanced Satellite Development and Know-How Transfer for the Philippines	ASP	Future planning of satellite missions and technology development projects for the Philippines' earth imaging needs. Assisting transition of such activities to the Philippine Space Agency.

== STEP-UP Project ==
One of the four components of the STAMINA4Space Program is the Space Science and Technology Proliferation through University Partnerships (STEP-UP) Project. Under the program engineering students from the University of the Philippines who seeks to pursue a nanosatellite engineering track will learn how to build nanosatellites within the university's Diliman campus and have a cube satellite designed by themselves tested for space environment at the Kyushu Institute of Technology in Japan. The satellites will then be launched to the International Space Station for deployment and students will be trained on operating the satellites.

A University Consortium on Space Science and Technology Applications is planned to be established within the STEP-UP Project and focus will be shifted to providing nanosatellite engineering scholarships and setting ground stations in within other universities in the country.

== Mission summary ==
Designation	Launch			Deployment			End of mission		Summary
Designation	Date	Site	Vehicle/Mission	Date	Site	Vehicle	Disposal	Date	Summary
Diwata-2	October 29, 2018	Tanegashima Space Center LA-Y	H-IIA	—			—		Replacement of Diwata-1
Maya-2	February 21, 2021	Wallops Flight Facility	Cygnus NG-15	March 14, 2021	ISS	—	Deorbited	July 5, 2022	Replacement of Maya-1
Maya-3	August 29, 2021	Kennedy Space Center, LC-39A	SpaceX CRS-23	October 6, 2021	ISS	—	Deorbited	August 4, 2022	
Maya-4	August 29, 2021	Kennedy Space Center, LC-39A	SpaceX CRS-23	October 6, 2021	ISS	—	Deorbited	August 8, 2022	
Maya-5	June 5, 2023	Kennedy Space Center, LC-39A	SpaceX CRS-28	July 19, 2023	ISS	—	—		
Maya-6	June 5, 2023	Kennedy Space Center, LC-39A	SpaceX CRS-28	July 19, 2023	ISS	—	—		
MULA	2025 (planned)	Future satellite							
