= PEDRO Center =

Ground station in the Philippines

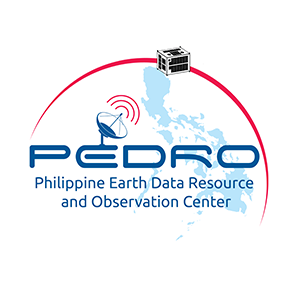

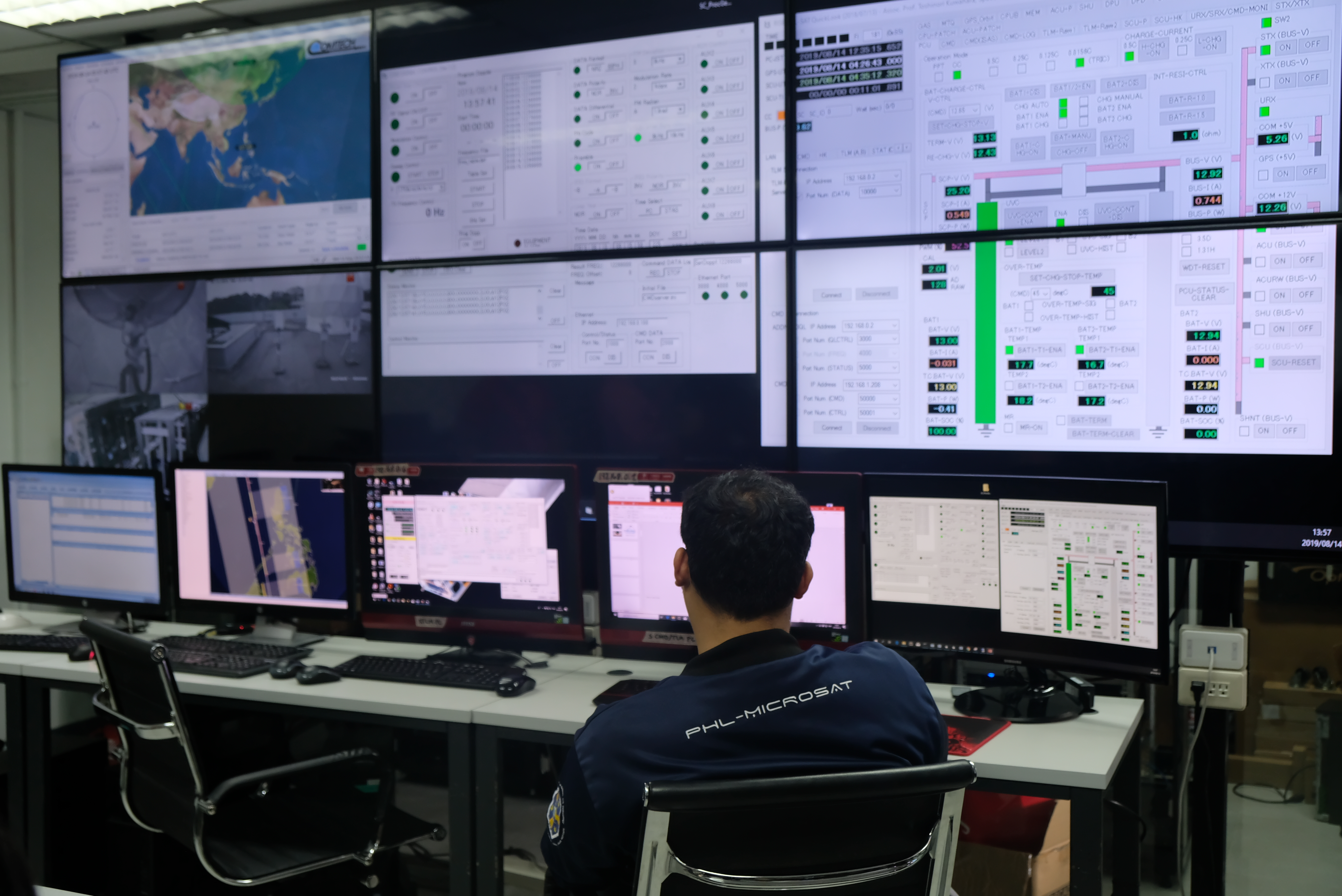
- Established: 2016
- Research type: Satellite ground station network
- Director: Franz de Leon
- Location: Quezon City, Davao City, and Dumangas, Philippines
- Affiliations: Department of Science and Technology
- Operating agency: Advanced Science and Technology Institute
- Website: asti.dost.gov.ph/projects/pedro-center/

The Philippine Earth Data Resource and Observation Center, also known as the PEDRO Center, is an organization tasked in operating satellite ground stations.

It is part of the Philippine Scientific Earth Observation Micro-satellite (Phil-Microsat) program by the Department of Science and Technology, which includes the deployment of the Diwata-1 and Diwata-2 microsatellites. It also receives information from commercial satellites.

== History ==
The Philippine Earth Data Resource and Observation (PEDRO) Center project was implemented by the Advanced Science and Technology Institute of the Department of Science and Technology in December 2016 following the launch of the Philippines' first microsatellite, Diwata-1 on April 26, 2016. The project was implemented to be able to establish a ground receiving station that would gather data from satellites.

== Satellite ground stations ==
PEDRO's first satellite ground station is situated at the Department of Science and Technology–Advanced Science and Technology Institute (DOST–ASTI) facility at the University of Philippines Diliman in Quezon City, Philippines. The facility has a 3.7 meters (12 ft) satellite tracking antenna.

The ground station was initially planned to be located inside the Subic Bay Freeport Zone in Subic, Zambales. This plan was reportedly changed in March 2016, with the ground station to be built in Diliman, Quezon City instead. Construction began in 2016 and PEDRO became operational by June 2017.

The second satellite ground station was launched on June 30, 2019 and is located at the Civil Aviation Authority of the Philippines (CAAP) Transmitter Facility in Davao City's Francisco Bangoy International Airport. The Davao facility has a 7.3 meters (24 ft) satellite tracking antenna and a 12.19 meters (40.0 ft) container van which serves as a control room.

A third ground station in Dumangas, Iloilo was launched in August 2022. While the first two stations were funded by the DOST, the Iloilo station was financed by the Japan International Cooperation Agency. The station was slated to open in July 2020 but was delayed because of the COVID-19 pandemic.

| Ground station | Location | Coordinates |
|---|---|---|
| ASTI Ground Receiving Station | University of the Philippines Diliman, Quezon City | 14.647219°N 121.0719533°E |
| Davao Ground Receiving Station | Francisco Bangoy International Airport, Davao City | |
| Iloilo Ground Receiving Station | Dumangas, Iloilo | |

== Linked satellites ==
Aside from the PHL-Microsat satellites the Pedro Center has access to data of other third-party satellites.

Multispectral satellites

- Diwata-1
- Diwata-2
- Maya-1
- Maya-2
- Maya-3
- Maya-4
- Maya-5
- Maya-6
- KompSat-3
- PlanetScope (Constellation of 100+ nanosatellites)
- RapidEye
- GeoEye-1
- WorldView-1
- WorldView-2
- WorldView-3
- Sentinel-2A
- Sentinel-2B

SAR satellites

- KompSat-5
- Cosmo-Skymed
