= Philippine Space Agency =

Program for beyond-Earth flight in the Southeast Asian state

Agency overview
- Abbreviation: PhilSA
- Formed: August 8, 2019; 7 years ago
- Type: Space agency
- Headquarters: 29th Floor, Cyber One Building, 11 Eastwood Ave. Bagumbayan Quezon City
- Administrator: Gay Jane Perez, Ad Interim
- Primary spaceport: None
- Owner: Office of the President of the Philippines
- Employees: 137 (2024)
- Annual budget: ₱847.66 million (2023)
- Website: philsa.gov.ph

The Philippine Space Agency (PhilSA) is the national space agency of the Philippines.

The unified space agency is defined by the Philippine Space Act (Republic Act No. 11363) which was signed into law on August 8, 2019, by President Rodrigo Duterte, intended to manage and operate the decentralized space program of the Philippine government, which was handled by various agencies of the Department of Science and Technology (DOST).

== History ==
=== Background ===
Prior to the creation of the agency, the Philippine space program had two primary challenges:

1. lack of a centralized agency to manage the space program; and therefore
2. insufficient funding

In the absence of a formal space agency, the DOST funded the National Space Development Program to set up the foundations of a future space agency. Several government agencies under the DOST had previously maintained the country's space program; namely the Philippine Atmospheric, Geophysical and Astronomical Services Administration (PAGASA), the National Mapping and Resource Information Authority (NAMRIA), and the National Disaster Risk Reduction and Management Council (NDRRMC). The DOST and the Manila Observatory crafted a 10-year masterplan in 2012 to make the Philippines a "space-capable country" by 2022. The scientists involved in the program's planning gave the media a copy of a draft bill written by Deocaris which they submitted to AGHAM Partylist Rep. Angelo Palmones of the 15th Congress (July 26, 2010 – June 6, 2013) for the enactment of what is to be known the "Philippine Space Act of 2012" (House Bill No. 6725).

In 2014, the country started a micro-satellite program where local engineers developed and produced the Diwata-1, Diwata-2 and Maya-1, which were all subsequently launched into space via foreign facilities. All three satellites were a success.

=== Legislative history ===
The Philippine Space Agency was proposed to be established through legislation particularly through the 17th Congress (July 25, 2016 – June 4, 2019)'s "Philippine Space Act of 2016" (House Bill No. 3637) and "Philippine Space Act" (Senate Bill No. 1211). On November 27, 2018, The House of Representatives passed the alternative bill, the "Philippine Space Development Act" (HB No. 8541), on the 2nd reading. "The bill also provides for a Philippine Space Development and Utilization Policy (PSDUP) that shall serve as the country’s primary strategic roadmap for space development and embody the country’s central goal of becoming a space-capable and space-faring nation in the next decade." DOST Secretary Fortunato dela Peña was in favor HB 8541.

In December 2018, HB 8541 was approved on the third and final reading with 207 affirmative votes with no votes against or abstentions. Under the bill, the agency was to be attached to the DOST. The bill also creates the Philippine Space Development Fund to be used exclusively for its operation. The astronomical space-related functions of the Department of Transportation (DOTr) and DOST will also be transferred to the Philippine Space Agency, under the bill.

The "Philippine Space Act" (Senate Bill No. 1983) was passed with 18 senators approving for the proposed legislation's passage with no negative votes in May 2019, hence dedicating ₱1bil from the current fiscal year's appropriation with subsequent funding from the General Appropriations Act, plus an additional ₱1bil from the Philippine Amusement and Gaming Corporation (PAGCOR) and Bases Conversion and Development Authority (BCDA) with ₱2bil released annually. The Bicameral Committee ratified HB 8541 on June 4, 2019, placing the space agency under the Office of the President. The proposed legislation (a harmonization of HB 8541 & SBN 1983) was due for signing into law by President Rodrigo Duterte. The Senate info-page for Senate Bill 1983 reports presentation of the harmonized bill to the Presidential Malacañang Palace on July 9, 2019.

=== Formation ===
Duterte signed the "Philippine Space Act" (RA 11363) on August 8, 2019, and a copy was released to reporters on August 13.

In signing the new law, Duterte recognized the “urgent need to create a coherent and unified strategy for space development and utilization to keep up with other nations in terms of space science and technology.” thus established the agency

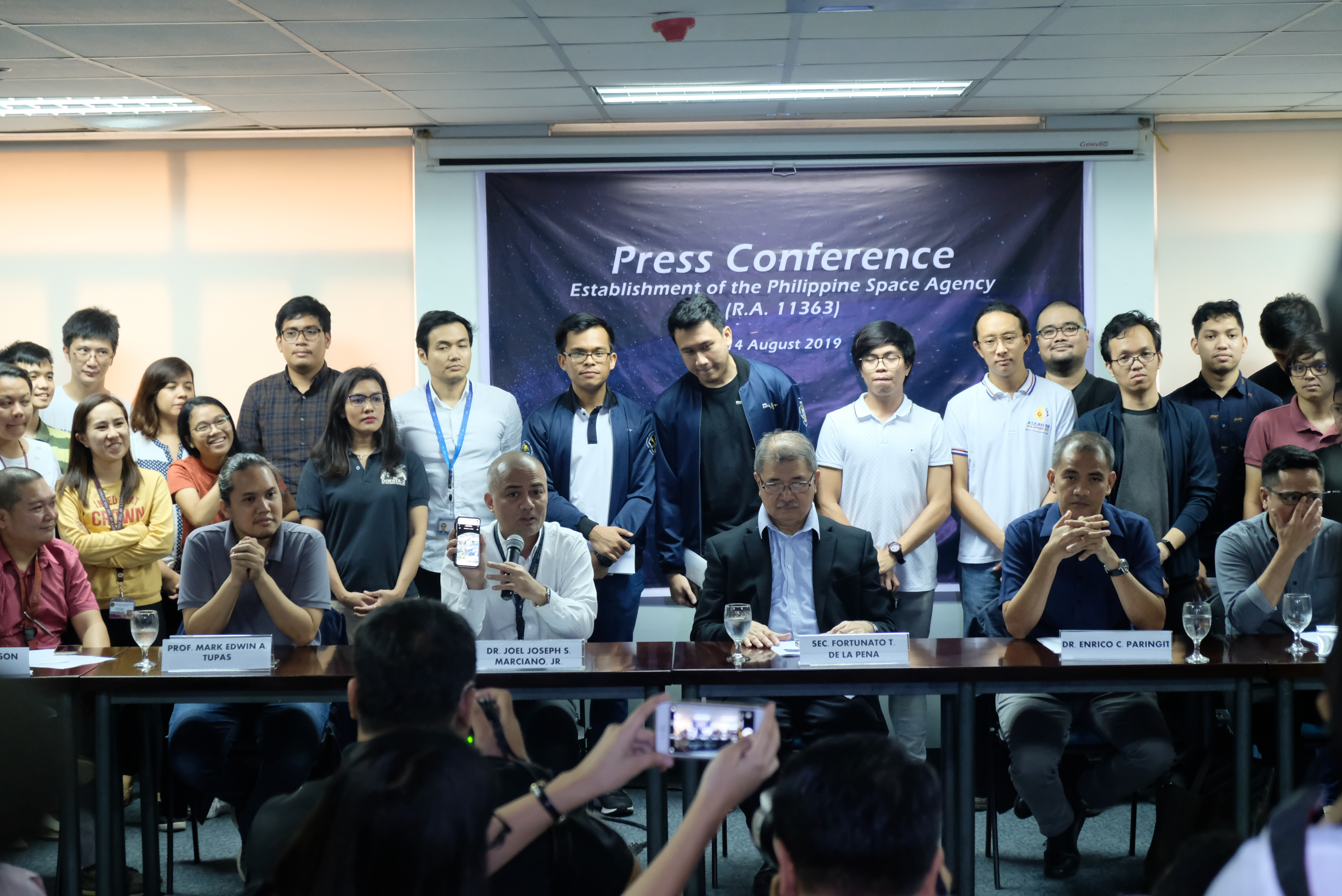
Press conference on the establishment of the Philippine Space Agency, August 14, 2019.

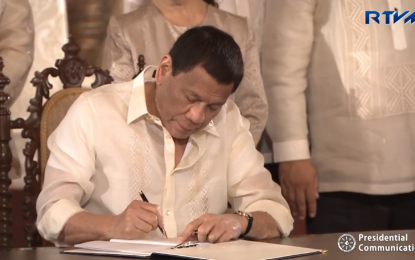
President Rodrigo Duterte signs the Philippine Space Act (RA 11363), August 2019

Following the Space Act's signing into law, DOST Secretary Dela Peña has written to the Office of the President to initiate the drafting of the implementing rules and regulations (IRR) of the space agency.

The first head of Philippine Space Agency, Joel Marciano Jr. was appointed on December 5, 2019, by President Duterte.

Although by law, PhilSA should hold its main office in Clark, the space agency decided to temporarily hold office in Quezon City at least until 2021. The space program started by the DOST in 2014 will also be transitioned to PhilSA.

== Organization ==
The Philippine Space Council is the agency's principal advisory body. It is proposed that at least 30 hectares (74 acres) will be allocated as PhilSA's headquarters and main research facility in an official site within the Clark Special Economic Zone in Pampanga and Tarlac with a target completion date of 2022. Additional facilities (launch sites, research and development) are also to be established in the future. The PhilSA announced in October 2021 that its headquarters, the National Space Center, would be built at New Clark City in Capas, Tarlac.

The agency is mandated to focus on six areas — national security and development, hazard management and climate studies, space research and development, space industry capacity building, space education and awareness, and international cooperation.

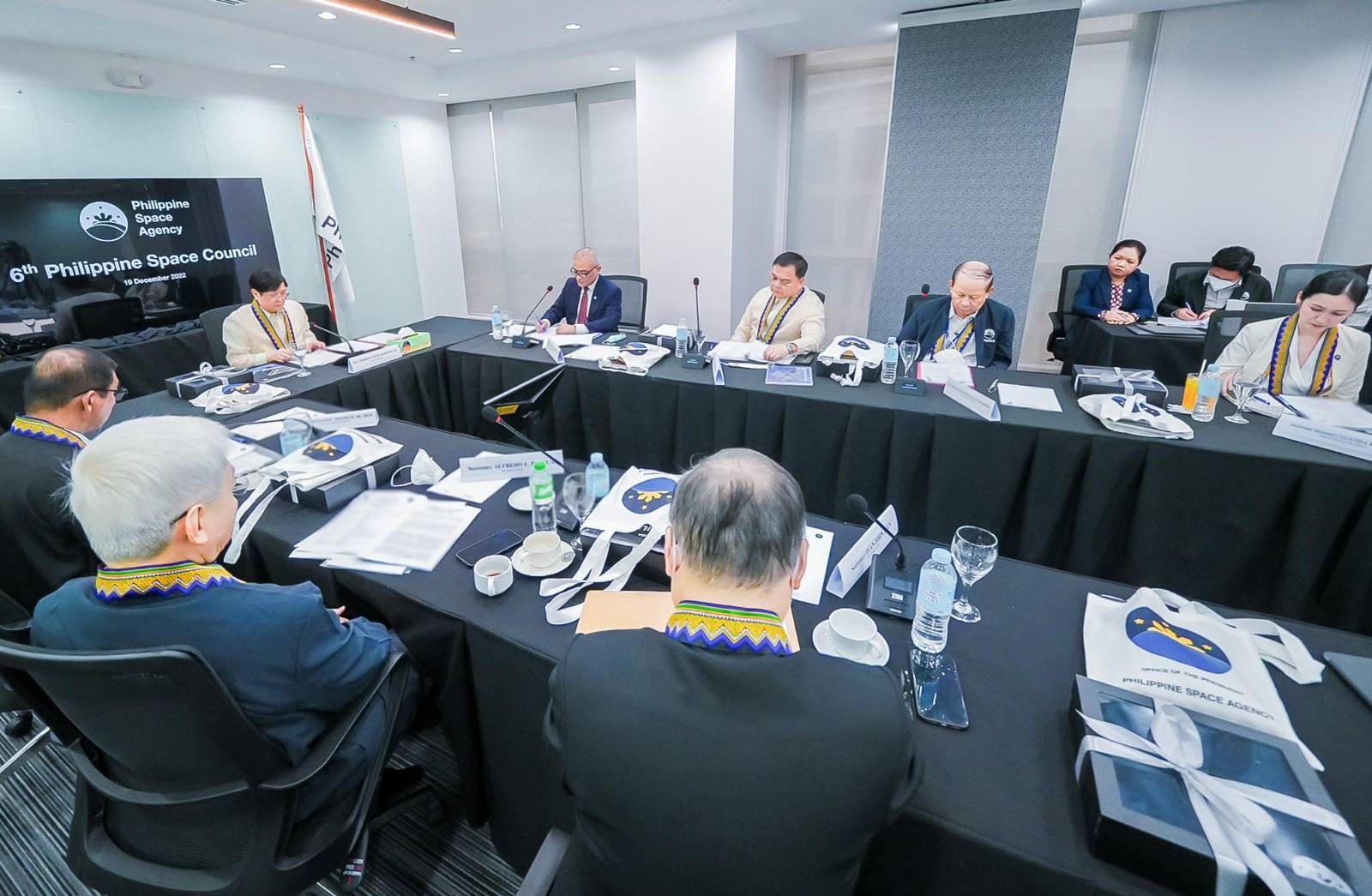
President Bongbong Marcos presides over the 6th Philippine Space Council meeting, December 19, 2022.

=== Philippine Space Council ===
The Philippine Space Council is the primary advisory body to the Director General. The council is headed by the President of the Philippines, who leads the council as its chairperson. The following is the composition of the space council:

- Chairperson – President of the Philippines
- Vice Chairpersons – Secretaries of Science and Technology and National Defense
- Other members
  - Chair of the Senate Committee on Science and Technology
  - Chair of the House Committee on Science and Technology
  - Director General of the National Economic and Development Authority
  - Secretaries of Finance, Foreign Affairs, Agriculture, Environment and Natural Resources, Trade and Industry, and Information and Communications Technology

== Activities ==
According to the Department of Science and Technology, the Philippines already possesses enough infrastructure to run a dedicated space agency. Since 2010, it has

- spent ₱7.48 billion (or $144 million) for space research and development,
- aided 5,500 scholars,
- trained more than 1,000 space science experts, and
- established 25 facilities in various parts of the Philippines.

It has also developed six small-scale satellites (Diwata-1, Diwata-2, Maya-1, Maya-2, Maya-3, Maya-4, Maya-5, and Maya-6) and had them launched and deployed to space. While the immediate goals of the agency will not involve launching rockets like with its United States and Japan counterparts National Aeronautics and Space Administration (NASA) and the Japan Aerospace Exploration Agency (JAXA), it is planned that the agency would pursue such goals in the long term.

In August 2024, PhilSA announced that the Multispectral Unit for Land Assessment (MULA) is scheduled for launch between late 2025 and early 2026 as part of the SpaceX Transporter 16 rideshare mission. The satellite will weigh approximately 130 kilograms and will carry multispectral imaging equipment that will support land use monitoring, agricultural assessments, maritime tracking, and disaster management operations. According to PhilSA officials, MULA is expected to be the largest satellite built for the Philippine space program to date.

== See also ==
- List of government space agencies
