= OrbitX =

Philippine aerospace company

- Trade name: OrbitX
- Formerly: OrbX
- Company type: Private
- Industry: Aerospace
- Founded: June 2, 2019; 7 years ago
- Defunct: 2023 (approximate)
- Headquarters: Quezon City
- Key people: Dexter Baño Jr. (CEO)
- Products: Cryptocurrency; Launch vehicles; Launch vehicle biofuel; Rocket engines; Quanta
- Website: orbitalxploration.com

Orbital Exploration Technologies, Inc., also known as Orbital Exploration or OrbitX, was a Philippine aerospace and space transportation company.

== History ==
OrbitX was established on June 2, 2019 as OrbX, a private venture by a group of youth including Dexter Baño Jr., Enzo Victor, and Paulo Sairel. OrbitX's short term goal was to develop the first indigenous reusable rocket, and the long-term goal was to send the first Filipino to Mars and back. OrbitX is known as the Philippines' first commercial spaceflight company.

Its first intended flagship project was the Haribon SLS-1 launch vehicle. OrbitX started a crowdfunding campaign which received support from Southeast Asian firm and Genix Ventures and other private individuals. It also received a two-year funding of $6,500 for research purposes from the Amazon Web Services.

In late 2023, the website for OrbitX was shut down. As of 2026, the website exists as a blog.

== Projects ==
=== Haribon SLS-1 ===
Haribon SLS-1
- Function: Small-lift Orbital launch vehicle
- Manufacturer: OrbitX
- Country of origin: Philippines

Capacity

Payload to 200km LEO

Launch history
- Status: Cancelled
- Total launches: 0
- Success(es): 0
- Failure: 0
- First flight: Planned 2023–2024, never occurred

OrbitX was developing its own space launch vehicle which it dubs as the Haribon SLS-1. It was planned to be propelled using components also to be developed by OrbitX: Tamaraw Rocket Engine and RP-2 fuel, a plastic-derived fuel. RP-2 got its named from RP-1, the refined kerosene that is typically used in rockets. In January 2021, the project moved to Technology Readiness Level 4 phase of development with its components still being validated in a laboratory environment. The rocket was projected to carry a payload of 200 kilograms (440 lb) into low Earth orbit. The company planned to have the maiden launch of the Haribon SLS-1 sometime between 2023 and 2024.

=== Fuels ===
Among OrbitX's research was the potential use of algae as biofuel for both small and large-scale space launch vehicles. The company has noted that algae-derived biofuel has already had prior use on aircraft; particularly in a Houston–Chicago Boeing 737 flight. It was also developing, OrbitX RP-2, its own proprietary fuel derived from pyrolysis-processed waste plastic.

=== Orbital Coin (ORBX) ===
On February 10, 2021, OrbitX teased about their in-house cryptocurrency. On February 12, 2021, OrbitX announced the cryptocurrency named Orbital Coin or ORBX, as they'll also fund the rocket using their in-house cryptocurrency.

On July 5, 2021, OrbitX announced their initial coin offering, as scheduled on July 20. ORBX was developed by ProofSys.io and OrbitX.

== Cooperation ==
OrbitX relayed its findings and developments to the Philippine Space Agency (PhilSA), the national space agency of the Philippine government, although OrbitX itself was a private venture and was independent from PhilSA. It also had partnerships and affiliations with the Space4Impact and Space Impulse, the Green Party of the Philippines, the Polytechnic University of the Philippines, and the government's Department of Environment and Natural Resources.
