= Multispectral Unit for Land Assessment =

Filipino Earth observation satellite

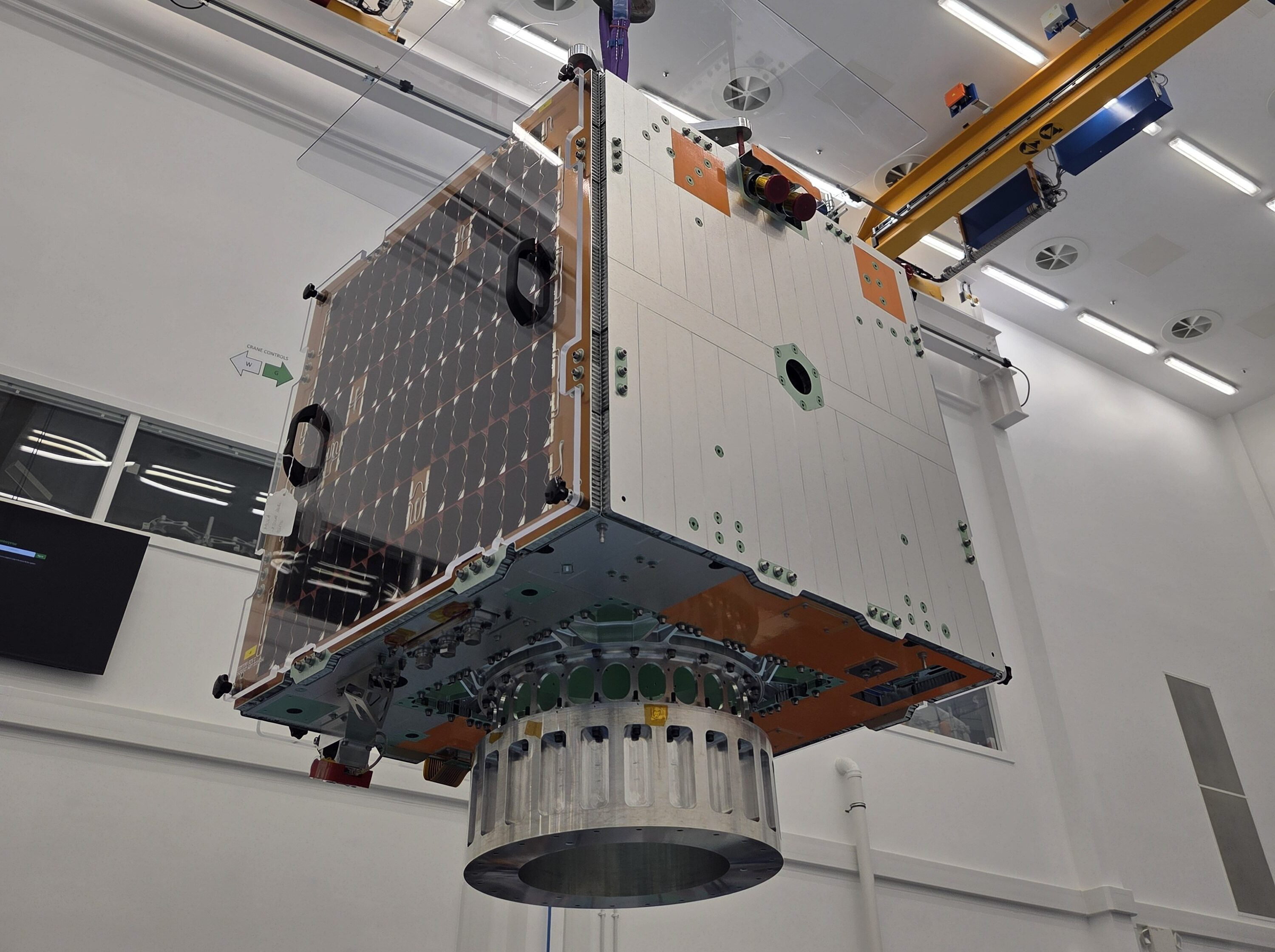
- MULA's main satellite body prior to integration with its camera payload.
- Names: MULA
- Mission type: Earth observation
- Operator: Philippine Space Agency
- Mission duration: 5–7 years (planned)

Spacecraft properties
- Bus: SSTL X-50
- Manufacturer: DOST; SSTL; University of the Philippines
- Launch mass: 130 kg (290 lb)
- Dimensions: 0.65 × 0.65 × 0.72 m (2.1 × 2.1 × 2.4 ft)
- Power: 35–85 watts

Start of mission
- Launch date: April 2027
- Contractor: SpaceX

Orbital parameters
- Reference system: Geocentric
- Regime: Low Earth
- Perigee altitude: 500 km
- Inclination: 97–98°

Transponders
- Bandwidth: X band down: 1 Gbit/s; S band up: 16 kb/s S band down: 2.2 Mbit/s
Instruments
- TCC: TrueColour Camera
- AIS: Automatic Identification System
- ADS-B: Automatic Dependent Surveillance-Broadcast
- Official mission patch STAMINA4Space Advanced Satellite and Know-how Transfer for the Philippines

The Multispectral Unit for Land Assessment (MULA) is a planned Filipino satellite dedicated in Earth observation and remote sensing. Upon completion it will become the largest satellite made by Filipinos.

== Development ==
The Philippine Space Agency (PhilSA) started the Multispectral Unit for Land Assessment (MULA) project in 2020 under its Advanced Satellite Program (ASP). The preliminary mission objectives of MULA was determined.

PhilSA announced on June 9, 2021, that a satellite is in development that would be bigger than the ones made previously under the Philippine Scientific Earth Observation Microsatellite (PHL-Microsat) program.

MULA would be the first of a "next-generation satellites" under the Philippine space program, with the team behind the satellite building on the knowledge gained in developing the Diwata and Maya nanosatellites. The investment cost for the satellite is at least US$34 million.

The satellite project is led by John Leur Labrador and is part of the ASP of the Department of Science and Technology (DOST). The University of the Philippines Diliman and DOST-Advanced Science and Technology Institute, in coordination of PhilSA, are the lead entities responsible for MULA's development. It is also co-designed with British firm Surrey Satellite Technology. Filipino engineers who worked on MULA were sent to the United Kingdom for an immersion on satellite design and manufacturing process.

Development was hampered by the COVID-19 pandemic. Progress continued from 2023. By June 2025, the MULA project is already in the testing phase.

At the ninth Philippine Space Council meeting in June 2026, President Bongbong Marcos approve plans to develop a satellite constellation under the MULA program.

== Instruments ==
MULA will weigh 130 kg (290 lb), and will become the largest Filipino-made satellite. It is equipped with a TrueColour camera which has a capability to capture images with a 5 m (16 ft) resolution and a wide swatch width of 120 km (75 mi). MULA will also have nine spectral bands for various environmental applications including land cove change mapping, crop monitoring, and disaster and forestry management. It will be designed to be able to take images of roughly 100,000 km^{2} (39,000 sq mi) of land area daily.

It will also be equipped with Automatic Identification System (AIS) and Automatic Dependent Surveillance–Broadcast (ADS–B) which could be used to detect and track aircraft and ships. The satellite will also have a jet propulsion system.

== Launch and mission ==
It was originally planned that MULA would be launched to space by 2023 but this schedule has been postponed to 2025. MULA will be positioned in a sun-synchronous low Earth orbit, and will rotate around the globe ten times daily.

During the 8th Philippine Space Council (PSC) meeting held on 12 August 2024, President Bongbong Marcos announced that MULA will be launched on a Falcon 9 rocket as part of SpaceX's Transporter-16 mission, scheduled for NET February 2026. As of June 2026, the projected launch date is slated for April 2027.

== See also ==
- List of Philippine satellites
