= National Space Development Program (Philippines) =

National SPACE Development Program
- Commercial?: No
- Type of project: Space program policy development and campaign for an establishment of a space agency
- Location: Philippines
- Owner: Philippine Council for Industry, Energy and Emerging Technology Research and Development
- Established: September 2015

The National Space Promotion, Awareness, and Capabilities Enhancement (SPACE) Development Program, simply known as the National SPACE Development Program (NSDP) is a government program of the Philippines set up to craft a policy for the country's space program and lay the foundation of a future dedicated space agency. The program is made under the Philippine Council for Industry, Energy and Emerging Technology Research and Development (PCIEERD) of the Department of Science and Technology.

The NSDP was created in September 2015 but preliminary work of the team behind the National SPACE Development Program began in 2013 where it was determined that a dedicated space agency needs to be set up to manage the country's space program. Currently the space-related activities of the government are managed and maintained by several government agencies. In 2016, information regarding activities of the NSDP became more available to the public. A cost-benefited study has been conducted by the NSDP regarding the a long-term Philippine space program and has identified potential return of investment (ROI) and investment from such program.

The NSDP scope includes:

- National Space Research and Development Agenda
- Satellite Development Roadmap
- Satellite Data Sharing and Management Policy
- Space Industry Development Roadmap

== See also ==
- Rogel Mari Sese, astrophysicist who served as head of the National Space Development Program
