= Diwata-1 =

Philippine microsatellite

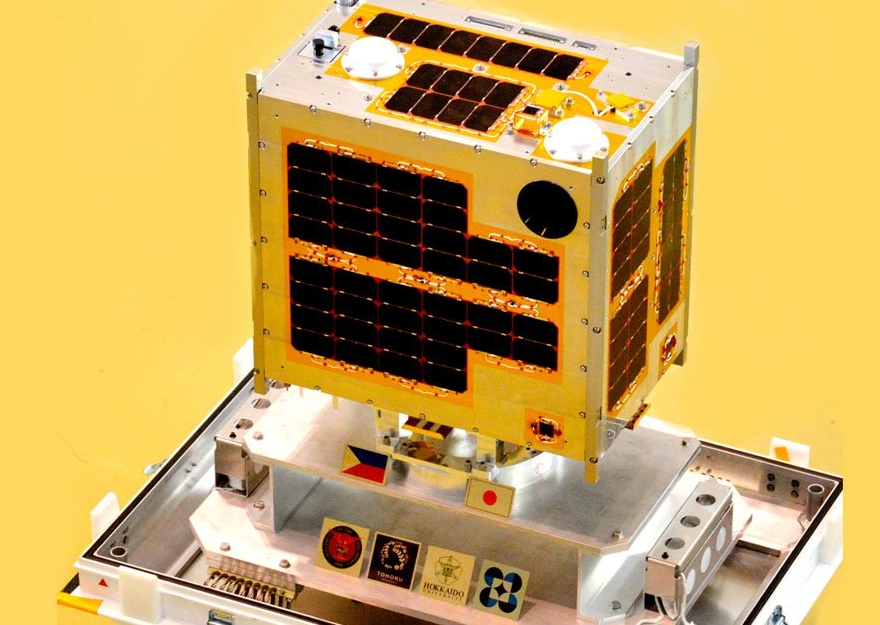
- Names: PHL-Microsat-1
- Mission type: Earth Observation
- Operator: DOST (through PEDRO); Tohoku University (through CRESST)
- COSPAR ID: 1998-067HT
- SATCAT no.: 41463
- Website: http://phl-microsat.upd.edu.ph/
- Mission duration: 4 years and 14 days

Spacecraft properties
- Manufacturer: DOST; University of the Philippines; Hokkaido University; Tohoku University
- BOL mass: 50 kg (110 lb)
- Dimensions: 55 cm × 35 cm × 55 cm (22 in × 14 in × 22 in)

Start of mission
- Launch date: 03:05:48, March 23, 2016 (UTC)
- Rocket: Atlas V 401
- Launch site: Cape Canaveral SLC-41
- Contractor: United Launch Alliance
- Deployed from: ISS
- Deployment date: 11:45, April 27, 2016 (UTC)
- Entered service: 22:33, April 27, 2016 (UTC)

End of mission
- Disposal: Decommissioned
- Deactivated: April 5, 2020 (UTC)
- Last contact: 08:49, April 5, 2020 (UTC)
- Decay date: 6 April 2020

Orbital parameters
- Reference system: Geocentric
- Regime: Low Earth
- Inclination: 51.6°
- Mean motion: 4
- Velocity: 7,000 m/s (16,000 mph)
Instruments
- HPT: High-Precision Telescope
- SMI: Space-borne Multispectral Imager (with Liquid Crystal Tunable Filter (LCTF))
- WFC: Wide-field Camera
- MFC: Middle-field Camera
- Diwata-1 mission emblem PHL-Microsat program

Diwata-1 also known as PHL-Microsat-1 was a Philippine microsatellite launched to the International Space Station (ISS) on March 23, 2016, and was deployed into orbit from the ISS on April 27, 2016. It was the first Philippine microsatellite and the first satellite built and designed by Filipinos. It was followed by Diwata-2, launched in 2018.

== Background ==
Hokkaido University and Tohoku University of Japan initiated a project to send 50 microsatellites into space by 2050. The project will photograph aftermaths of natural disasters, partnering with governments, universities and other organizations based in Bangladesh, Indonesia, Malaysia, Myanmar, Mongolia, Philippines, Thailand, and Vietnam. Two satellites are commissioned for the Philippine government.

Diwata-1 was the first satellite of the venture made possible through the Philippine Scientific Earth Observation Microsatellite (PHL-Microsat) Program, a three-year program funded by the Department of Science and Technology (DOST). The program is a collaboration between the University of the Philippines, the DOST-Advanced Science and Technology Institute (DOST-ASTI), and Japan's Tohoku University and Hokkaido University. It was initiated in December 2014 by DOST. The satellite was an updated version of the Raijin-2, which was developed by the two Japanese universities.

Uploading of commands to Diwata-1 and downloading of the images were done in the Philippines' very own Philippine Earth Data Resources Observation Center (PEDRO) ground receiving station. Image processing was also performed locally.

There were two Philippine satellites before Diwata-1, Agila-1 and Agila-2 (later renamed ABS-3) but the former was owned and operated by a non-Philippine firm, PT Pasifik Satelit Nusantara, at the time of its launch and the latter was owned by Mabuhay Satellite Corporation, a private local firm, but later acquired by Asia Broadcast Satellite, a foreign firm.

The government has been availing services from foreign countries for satellite imagery. Carlos Primo David, former executive director of the Philippine Council for Industry, Energy and Emerging Technology Research and Development (PCIEERD) called the PHL-Microsat program a "small investment" taking note that in 2013, following the aftermath of Typhoon Haiyan (locally known as Typhoon Yolanda), the government had to pay about ₱56 million for satellite imagery of an area affected by the typhoon dubbed as the "Yolanda Corridor". This led to the creation of the PHL-Microsat program.

== Etymology ==
The satellite was named after a type of divine being from Philippine mythology, the diwata.

== Development ==
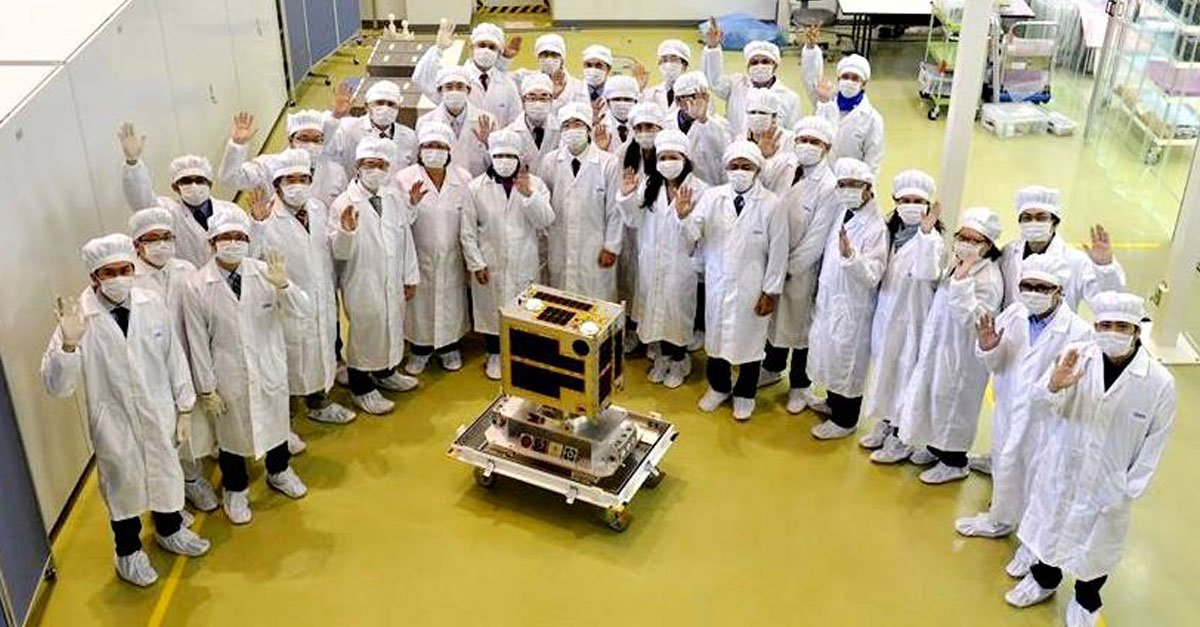
The turnover of the satellite to JAXA at the Tsukuba Space Center, January 13, 2016

A team of nine Filipino engineers from the DOST-Advanced Science and Technology Institute (ASTI) and the University of the Philippines, dubbed the "Magnificent 9", were responsible for the production of Diwata-1 and collaborated with scientists and engineers from the two Japanese universities. They were sent to Japan in October 2015. The assembly and testing of Diwata-1 was completed in December 2015.

Diwata-1 was handed over to the Japan Aerospace Exploration Agency (JAXA) on January 13, 2016, at the Tsukuba Space Center in Tsukuba, Japan. On January 18, 2016, JAXA sent the satellite to the National Aeronautics and Space Administration (NASA) in the United States after conducting final tests on the satellite.

Component tests, first vibration tests, post-vibration electrical tests, off-gas test, and fit checking were conducted on the satellite. Continuous functionality test of modules and sensors and software optimization were also done on the satellite.

== Instruments ==
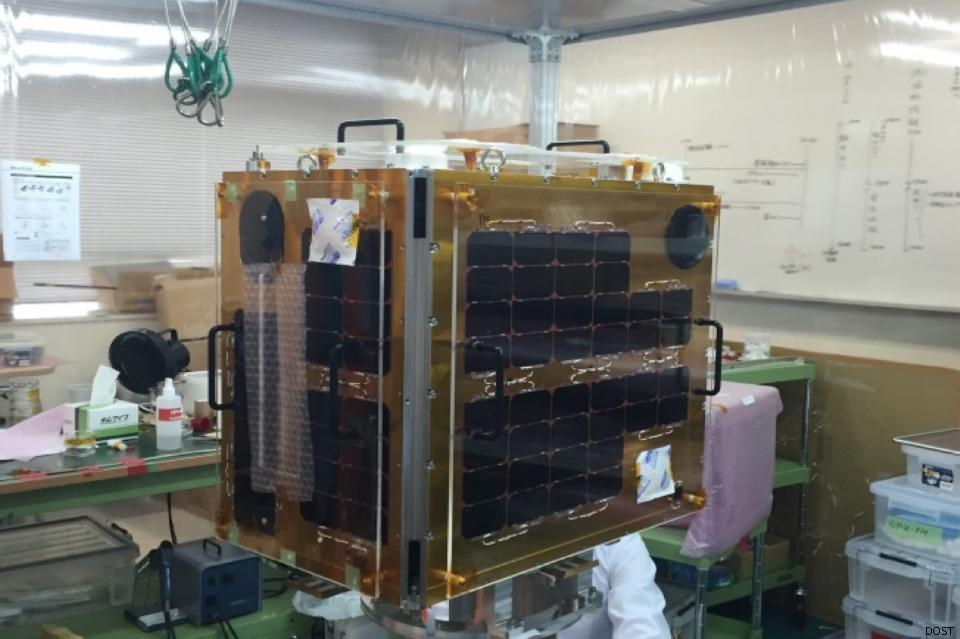
Diwata-1 in Japan

Diwata-1 had three scientific instruments: the High Precision Telescope (HPT); Space-borne Multispectral Imager (SMI) with Liquid Crystal Tunable Filter (LCTF); and the Wide Field Camera (WFC). Diwata-1 also had one engineering control instrument, the Middle Field Camera (MFC).

The HPT – with a ground sample distance (GSD) of 3 metres (9.8 ft) at 400 kilometres (250 mi) – was studied on how it can be used to monitor the extent of damages from natural disasters such as typhoons. It was also equipped with four CCDs for the red, blue, green, and near infrared regions of light.

The SMI with LCTF – with a GSD of 80 metres (260 ft) at 400 kilometres (250 mi) – was studied on how it can be used in measuring vegetation changes and phytoplankton biomass in Philippine waters. The instrument was equipped with two CCDs for both visible (420–700 nm) and near infrared (650–1050 nm) regions with a 13 nm interval.

The WFC – which has a GSD of 7 kilometres (4.3 mi) and a panchromatic CCD with a field view of 1800 × 1340 – was used to give visualizations of large-scale cloud patterns and distributions. Diwata-1 could be used to take daily images using the WFC in case of any upcoming large-scale weather disturbances, such as storms or typhoons.

The calibration of the attitude determination algorithm was handled by the MFC. The instrument was equipped with a colored CCD and expected GSD of 185 metres (607 ft), and also aided in locating images captured by the HPT and SMI.

== Launch and mission ==
=== Launch from Cape Canaveral ===
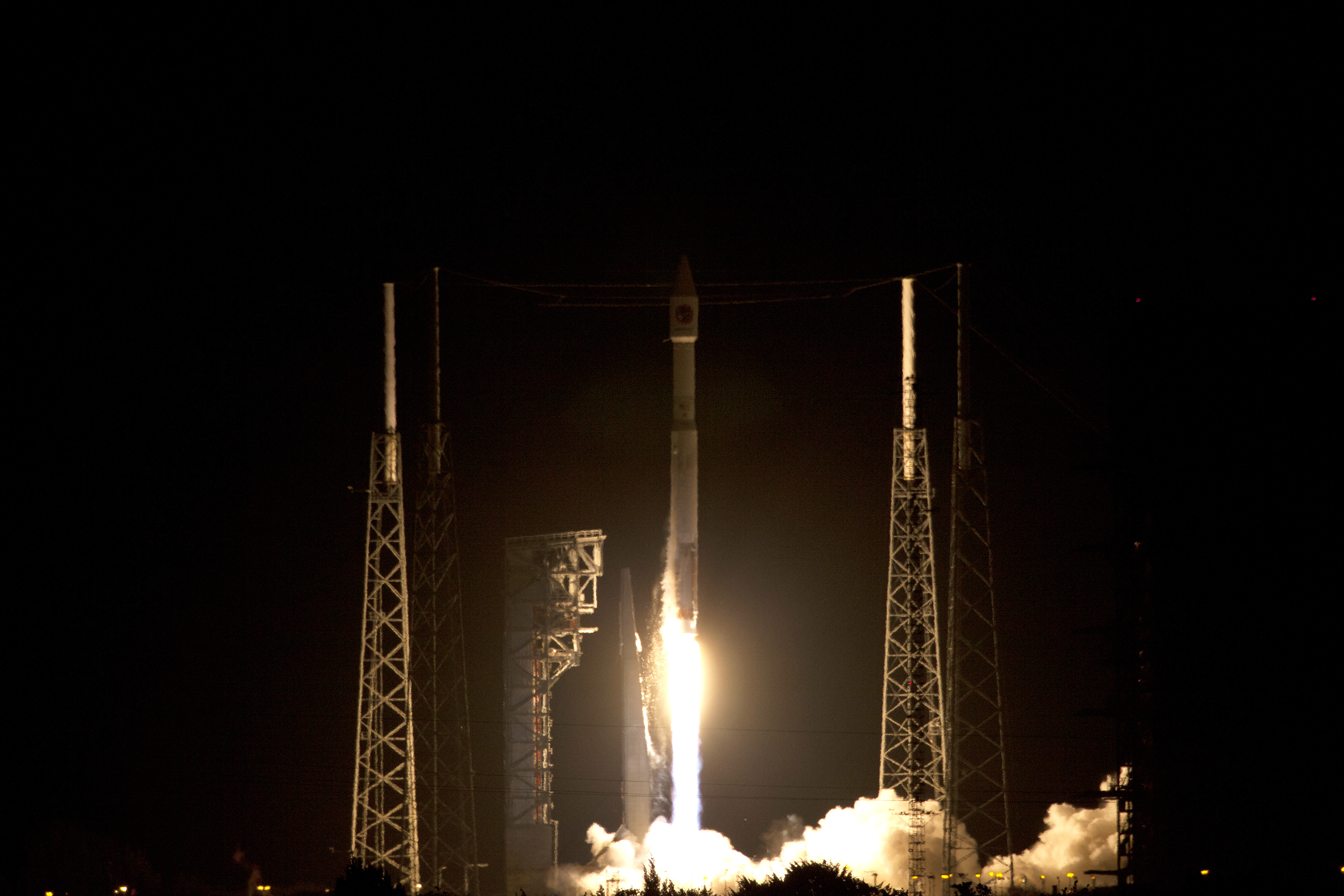
Atlas V rocket that carried Cygnus CRS OA-6, which delivered Diwata-1 to the ISS.

The launch of Diwata-1 occurred on March 23, 2016, at Cape Canaveral, Florida in the United States. It was a payload of Orbital ATK's Cygnus spacecraft which was launched through the Atlas V rocket as part of a supply mission to the International Space Station (ISS). Initially, the plan was to launch Diwata-1 through a vehicle by SpaceX, from either California or Florida. Earlier, an orbital slot was secured from JAXA for Diwata-1. Cygnus managed to reach the ISS on March 26. The spacecraft unloaded its cargo, including Diwata-1, to the ISS in the span of two weeks.

=== Deployment into orbit from the ISS ===
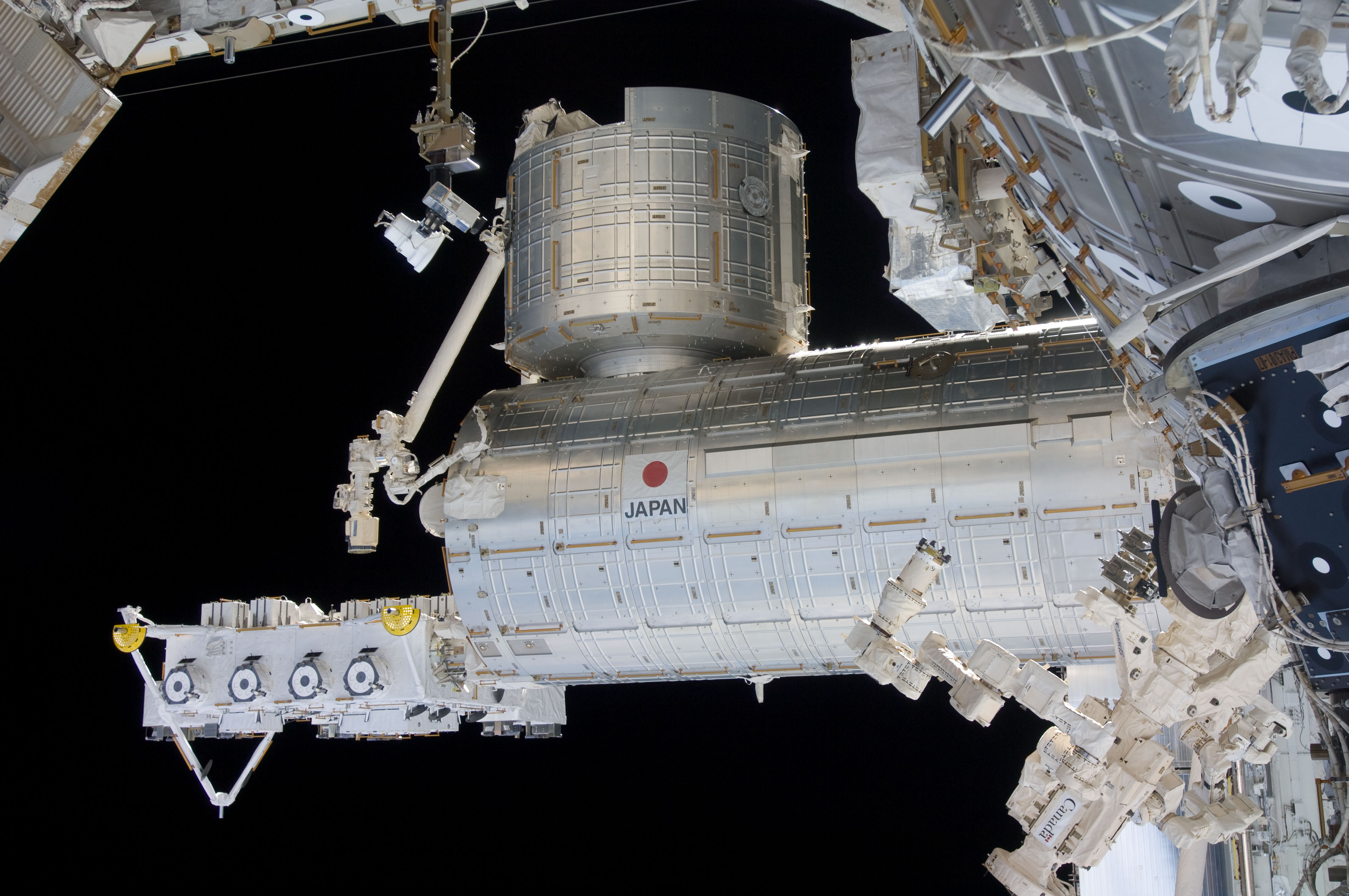
The Kibo module at the ISS

Diwata-1 was set to be deployed from the International Space Station from the Kibo module. The satellite was inspected on board the station before its deployment in April for at least 18 months of program activity. The deployment mechanism for the satellite was the JEM Small Satellite Orbital Deployer (J-SSOD).

By January 2016, the Kibo module had already deployed 106 small satellites. The Diwata-1 deployment marked the first attempt of the module to deploy a smaller, 50-kg class, microsatellite. The deployment of Diwata-1 was scheduled on April 20 or 21, 2016. Prior to the Cygnus launch, The DOST had made a request to JAXA to deploy the satellite into space between March 21 and April 30, 2016, at the time the ISS is at its highest altitude. The deployment was later announced to take place on April 27, 7:00 p.m (PST). The actual deployment occurred at 7:45 p.m. with British astronaut Tim Peake involved in the operation to put the satellite into orbit.

In the occasion of the deployment, the Philippine flag was raised along with the Japanese flag at the Tsukuba Space Center of the JAXA.

=== Operation ===
The mission duration of the satellite was expected to take place for around 20 months, 2 months longer than earlier reported. The engineering team behind Diwata-1 at the Tohoku University was able to receive the satellite's first communication hours later after its deployment from the ISS, at 7:45 p.m. PST.

A ground station based in the Philippines, the Philippine Earth Data Resources Observation (PEDRO) Center, had primary control over the satellite with a command line on the UHF band. PEDRO received telemetry data sent by Diwata-1 via UHF band and received images via X-band. The Tohoku University Ground station (CRESST) also has access to the satellite.

Weeks into the satellite's deployment since the Cygnus launch, the setting up of a temporary ground receiving station at the DOST ASTI building was being hastened by DOST units, PCIEERD and Advanced Science and Technology Institute. Diwata-1 was operational at least a week after its deployment into orbit.

The satellite's first images were released in public by the Tohoku University on June 2, 2016, via a Japanese press release. The satellite shot images of Isabela province on the island of Luzon, and parts of Northern Japan. It also captured images of the coastlines of Palawan, showing signs of siltation on certain parts of the coastline.

By October 2018, Diwata-1 has captured 14,492 images in the Philippines covering an area equivalent to 32 percent of the country's land area. Among those captured images was that of Semirara Island and Laguna de Bay. As of the same month, the satellite remained operational and was projected to be still functioning for at least three years given favorable conditions in space.

The decommissioning phase of Diwata-1 began on March 20, 2020, and was made to drop its altitude. It entered the Earth's atmosphere on April 6, 2020, and the last signal from the satellite was received at 4:49 a.m. PST. The satellite had photographed 114,087 square metres (1,228,020 sq ft) of the Philippines, had captured more than 17,000 images of the Earth, orbited the Earth about 22,642 times, and passed by the Philippines around 4,800 times throughout its mission.

== Impact ==
"We hope that this inspires our young children to go into space science; it overcomes a psychological barrier. A lot of kids think of this as just science fiction. But this shows that Filipinos, given enough support, can do what first world countries are doing in space"

— Dr. Fidel Nemenzo, UP-Diliman Vice Chancellor for Research and Development on Diwata-1 following its deployment into orbit.

One of the major goals of the PHL-Microsat program, to which Diwata-1 belongs, is to boost the progress on the creation of the Philippine Space Agency. Then-DOST secretary Mario Montejo said that the Diwata-1 may pave the way for development of the local electronics and aerospace industries, which would complement a satellite-building industry.

The University of the Philippines Diliman campus has allocated an area for a space research laboratory for the continued development of microsatellite technology, where the Filipino scientists who were involved in the Diwata-1 project can teach and train local engineers. The facility will be funded by the PCIEERD of DOST.

== See also ==
- Space program of the Philippines
  - Agila-2
  - Diwata-2
  - Maya-1
  - Multispectral Unit for Land Assessment (MULA)
