= Rogel Mari Sese =

Filipino astrophysicist

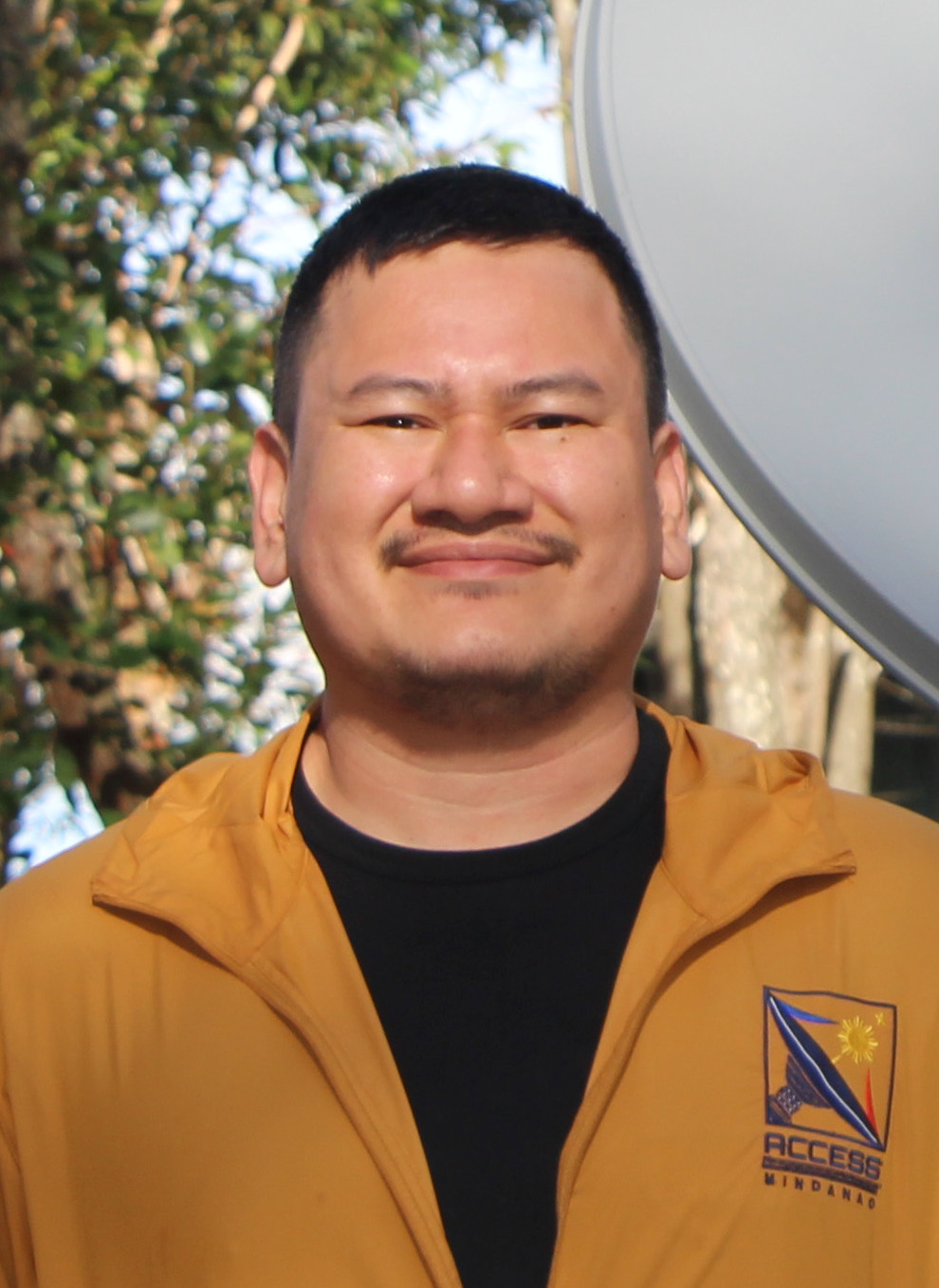
- Born: Laguna, Philippines
- Education: University of the Philippines Los Baños; University of the Philippines Diliman; University of Tsukuba
- Children: 2
- Scientific career
- Fields: Astrophysics
- Workplaces: University of the Philippines Los Baños; Department of Science and Technology; Ateneo de Davao University; Regulus SpaceTech Inc.

Rogel Mari D. Sese is a Filipino astrophysicist who is known for being a proponent of space science in the Philippines.

== Early life and education ==
Rogel Mari D. Sese was born in the province of Laguna in the Philippines. His mother was biological sciences professor at the University of the Philippines Los Baños (UPLB). Sese said that he had decided to pursue a career related to space science as early as the age of five. His mother taught him biology, such as how to splice a DNA, but he did not find sufficient interest in the field.

He attended University of the Philippines Rural High School. Having developed interest in physics while in high school, he pursued a degree in applied physics at the UPLB. This was the closest to an astrophysics degree he could find, since he was not able to find a university which offered such a degree at that time. He decided to specialize in instrumentation development and design, and attained his master's degree at the Diliman campus of the same university.

He pursued a doctorate degree in physics at the University of Tsukuba in Japan and took computational astrophysics as his specialization. He attained his doctorate in 2009 and moved back to the Philippines in 2011.

== Career ==
After graduating from the University of the Philippines Diliman, Sese worked at the Los Baños campus as an instructor. He briefly stopped teaching to pursue his doctorate in Japan.

As one of the only three astrophysicists in the Philippines as of 2017, Sese joined the Department of Science and Technology and served as the head of the National Space Development Program, which was launched in order to set up the foundation of a future space agency. He also set up his own firm, Regulus SpaceTech Inc., which is involved in space research and development, education and consultancy.

He also promoted the teaching of space education in high schools and elementary schools through the Philippine Space Science Education Program (PSSEP), which also led to more universities in the Philippines offering degrees in aerospace engineering, and lobbied for legislation related to space science. He contributed to the writing of the proposed legislation "Act Establishing the Philippine Space Development and Utilization Policy and Creating the Philippine Space Agency", which aims to establish a national space agency.

As of 2021 Sese is affiliated with Ateneo de Davao University (ADDU) and is department chairperson of the Aerospace Engineering department. He is also a member of Ateneo de Davao University's board of trustees. He is also leading a satellite internet project in ADDU, the ACCESS Mindanao project.

== Recognition and honours ==
Sese, along with seven other Filipino scientists, was included in Asian Scientist 100 list released in March 2018, which recognizes the contribution of individuals in Asia in the field of science and technology. Their inclusion was recognized by the Senate of the Philippines via a resolution.

In 2020 he was selected as a Karman Fellow for his work in space.

== Personal life ==
Sese is married and has two children.
