= Tsukuba Space Center =

Research facility of JAXA

Coordinates: 36°3′56.8″N 140°7′47.3″E

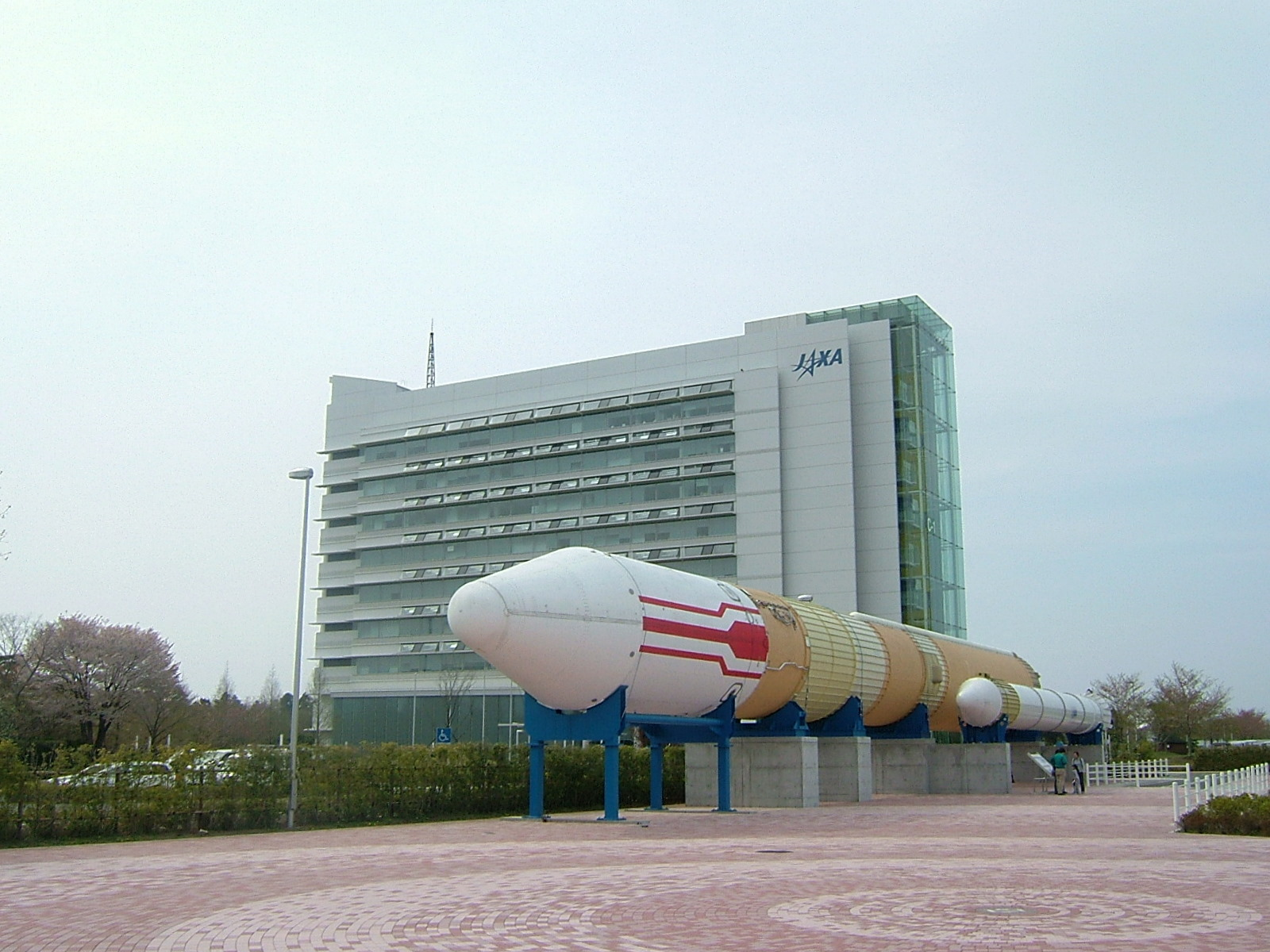
H-II rocket at the TKSC

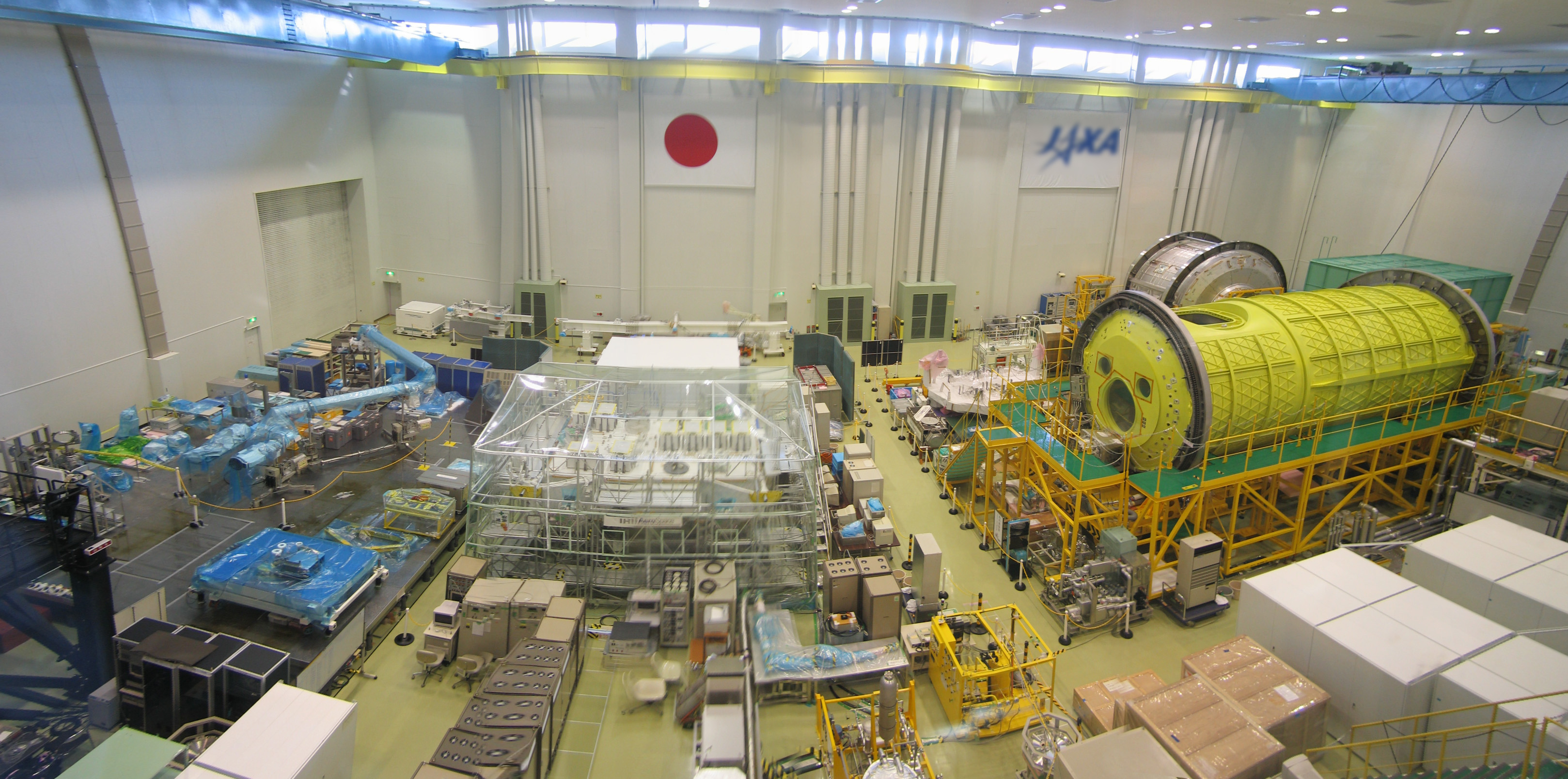
Inside the Space Station Test Building (2005)

The Tsukuba Space Center (TKSC) also known by its radio callsign Tsukuba, is the operations facility and headquarters for the Japan Aerospace Exploration Agency (JAXA) located in Tsukuba Science City in Ibaraki Prefecture. The facility opened in 1972 and serves as the primary location for Japan's space operations and research programs. Japanese astronauts involved in the International Space Station are trained in part here in addition to the training they receive at the Lyndon B. Johnson Space Center, in Houston, Texas.

The complex has several facilities that are used to assemble JAXA's satellites, and the Japanese Experiment Module for the International Space Station.

The TKSC offers tours of the facility as well as an exhibit hall which features models of the H-II Transfer Vehicle and a full-sized mock-up of the Kibō module on the International Space Station.

== See also ==
- International Space Station
- Japan Aerospace Exploration Agency
- Other JAXA facilities
