= TALA (rocket) =

Hybrid-Propellant rocket

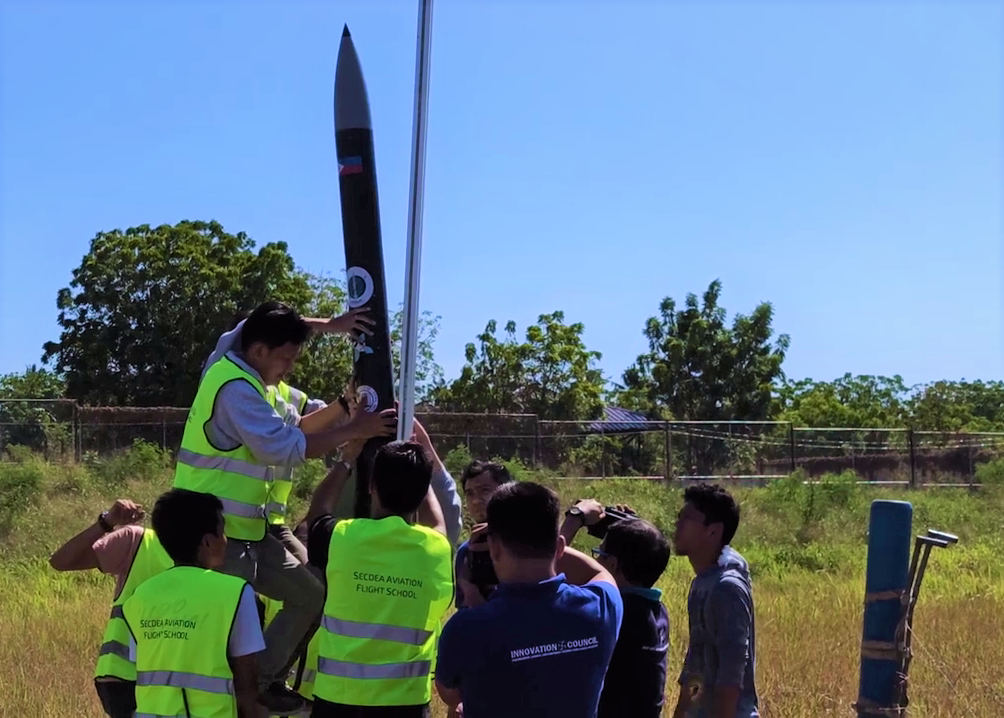
- Function: Technology demonstration
- Manufacturer: St. Cecilia's College-Cebu
- Country of origin: Philippines

Size
- Height: 3 m (9.8 ft)
- Mass: 15 kg (33 lb)

Launch history
- Status: In development
- Launch sites: Crow Valley Gunnery Range, Capas
- Total launches: 1
- Success(es): 1

TALA is a hybrid-propellant rocket which is the first of its kind to be developed in the Philippines.

== Background ==
The rocket was made from 3D-printed advanced composite materials and measures 3 meters (9.8 ft) and weighs 15 kilograms (33 lb). It is designed to propel a Can Satellite (CanSat) around 5 kilometers (3.1 mi) into the atmosphere.

TALA is developed by a team of students and teachers from St. Cecilia's College-Cebu. They have been assisted by the government's Department of Science and Technology – Philippine Council on Industry, Energy, and Emerging Technology Research and Development (DOST-PCIEERD). DOST-PCIEERD awarded them a research grant in 2018 to develop the hybrid rocket.

== Launch ==
The first launch attempt was conducted on March 11, 2020, at the Mati Airport in Davao Oriental. The rocket launch was scrubbed due to pressure loss in one of its tanks, but it was rescheduled for launch two days later. However, the team had to return to Minglanilla, Cebu immediately because of the ongoing heightened restrictions of the Enhanced Community Quarantine (ECQ) brought by the COVID-19 pandemic.

In early 2022, the TALA research team began coordinating with the Philippine Air Force Research and Development Center for the potential launch of the hybrid rocket. TALA had its first launch on May 20, 2023 from the Crow Valley Gunnery Range in Capas, Tarlac. It was originally scheduled to be launched a day earlier but was postponed due to adverse environmental conditions. It carried a "can satellite" as payload.
