= PHL-Microsat =

Satellite program of the Philippines

- Program logo

Program overview
- Country: Philippines / Japan
- Organization: Department of Science and Technology; University of the Philippines; Hokkaido University; Tohoku University
- Purpose: Microsatellite development and operation
- Status: Completed

Program history
- Duration: 2014–2018
- Successes: 3

The Philippine Scientific Earth Observation Microsatellite (PHL-Microsat) was a satellite program carried by the Department of Science and Technology (DOST) of the Philippines in cooperation with the Tohoku and Hokkaido University of Japan.

== Background ==
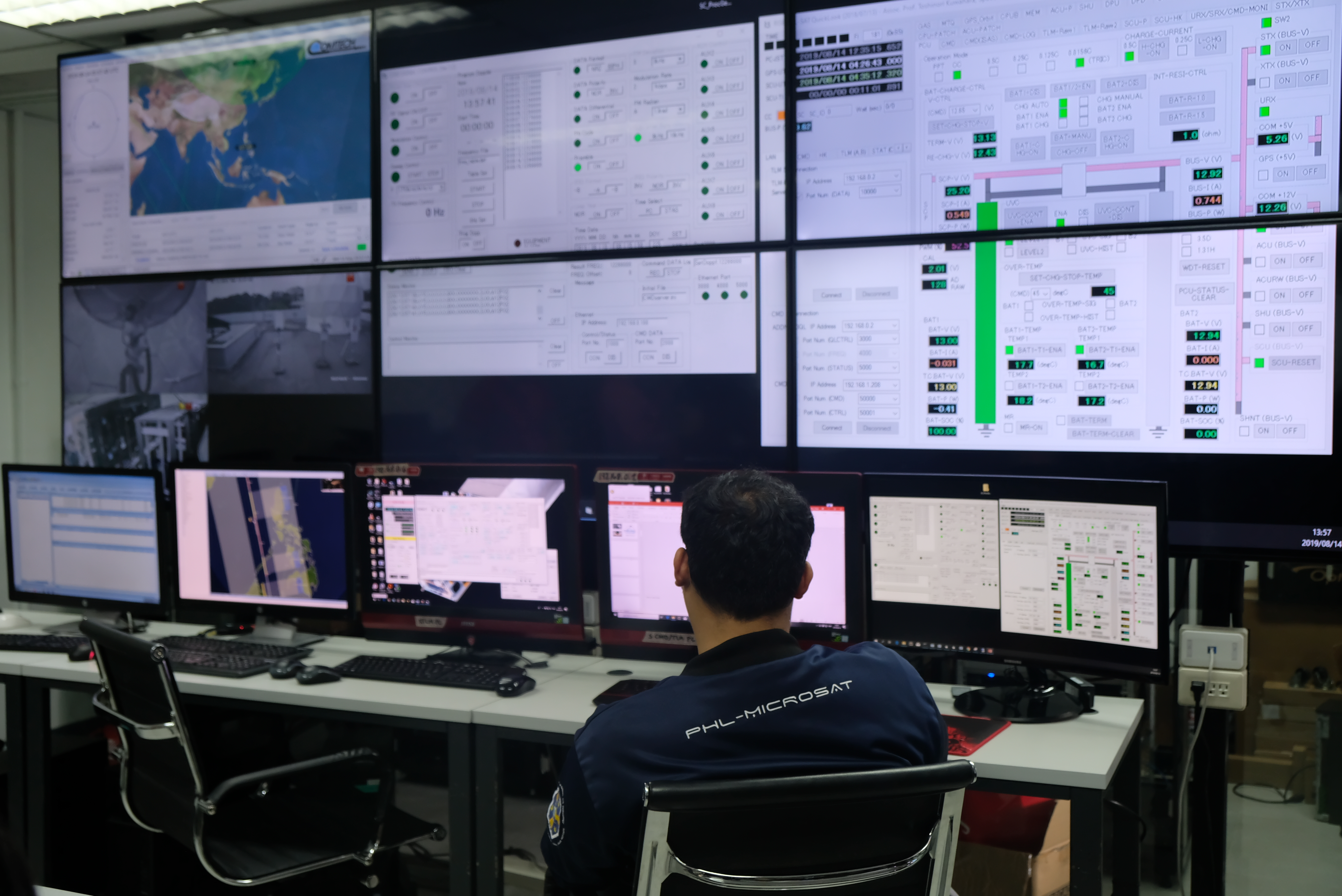
Inside the PEDRO Center.

Hokkaido University and Tohoku University of Japan initiated a project to send 50 microsatellites into space by 2050. The project will photograph aftermaths of natural disasters, partnering with governments, universities and other organizations based in Bangladesh, Indonesia, Malaysia, Myanmar, Mongolia, Philippines, Thailand, and Vietnam. Two satellites are commissioned for the Philippine government.

Diwata-1 is the first satellite of the venture and is also a part of the Department of Science and Technology's Philippine Scientific Earth Observation Micro-Satellite (PHL-Microsat) Program which was initiated in December 2014 by the government agency. The satellite is an updated version of the Raijin-2, which was developed by the two Japanese universities. The satellite was deployed from the International Space Station on April 27, 2016. Diwata-1 was replaced by Diwata-2 sometime in 2018.

The Philippine Department of Science and Technology (DOST) announced on June 29, 2017 that two CubeSats or nanosatellites will be launch in 2018. One of these satellites was Maya-1, a nanosatellite developed under the Kyushu Institute of Technology-led Birds-2 project, was launched to space. The equipment is the first nanosatellite of the Philippines and is also placed under the PHL-Microsat program. It is to be deployed from the ISS sometime in August 2018, On August 10, Maya-1 was deployed from the ISS along with satellites from Bhutan and Malaysia.

The PHL-Microsat program was officially succeeded by the STAMINA4Space Program in August 2018. The last satellite launched under the PHL-Microsat program, Maya-1 was decommissioned in November 2020.

== Phases ==
The project is divided into five sub-projects or phases.

Project No.	Objective
1	Development of Diwata-1 and Diwata-2 microsatellites
2	Development of a ground receiving station
3	Data processing, archiving and distribution subsystem development
4	Calibration and validation of remote sensing instruments
5	Remote sensing data product development

== Mission summary ==
Designation	Launch			Deployment			Summary
Designation	Date	Site	Vehicle	Date	Site	Vehicle	Summary
Diwata-1	March 23, 2016	Cape Canaveral SLC-41	Atlas V 401	April 27, 2016	ISS	Kibo module	First microsatellite of the Philippines
Diwata-2	October 29, 2018	Tanegashima Space Center LA-Y	H-IIA	—N/a			Replacement of Diwata-1
Maya-1	June 29, 2018	Cape Canaveral SLC-40	Falcon 9 Full Thrust	August 10, 2018	ISS	Kibo module	First nanosatellite of the Philippines.
