= Diwata-2 =

Philippine microsatellite

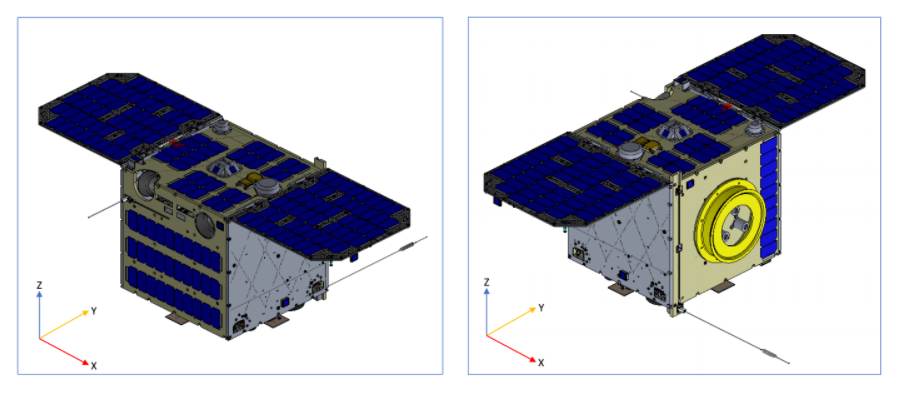
- Mission type: Communications / Earth Observation
- COSPAR ID: 2018-084H
- SATCAT no.: 43678

Spacecraft properties
- Manufacturer: DOST; University of the Philippines; Hokkaido University; Tohoku University
- BOL mass: 56 kg (123 lb)

Start of mission
- Launch date: 04:51, October 29, 2018 (UTC)
- Rocket: H-IIA
- Launch site: Tanegashima LA-Y
- Contractor: Mitsubishi Heavy Industries

Orbital parameters
- Reference system: Sun-synchronous orbit
- Regime: Low Earth

Instruments
- High Precision Telescope (HPT); Space-borne Multispectral Imager (SMI) (with Liquid Crystal Tunable Filter (LCTF)); Enhanced Resolution Cameras; Amateur Radio

Diwata-2 or Diwata-2B is a Philippine microsatellite launched on October 29, 2018. It is the first satellite launched under the STAMINA4Space program.

== Development ==
The satellite was developed by 11 scholars under the Philippine Department of Science and Technology (DOST), in cooperation with the Tohoku University and Hokkaido University in contrast to 9 DOST scholars who worked with Diwata-1, Diwata-2's predecessor.

Unlike its predecessor, Diwata-2 takes advantage of radio communication technology by carrying an amateur radio payload for disaster relief purposes. The satellite also hosts all embedded features of its predecessor.

The planning phase of the Diwata-2's development includes a simulation model, a mechanical test model, an engineering model and a flight model. This stage ended with the flight model which was completed on August 29, 2018, and was handed over to the Japan Aerospace Exploration Agency (JAXA) on the following day.

== Instruments ==
Weighing 56 kg (123 lb), Diwata-2 hosts an amateur radio payload which will enable people in the Philippines to relay messages through ham radio to any part of the country. This function is meant for disaster relief operations. The satellite will also carry Spaceborne Multispectral Imager (SMI) with liquid crystal tunable filter (LCTF) for environmental monitoring, and a high precision telescope (HPT) for rapid post-disaster assessment. Compared to Diwata-1 which hosted wide and middle field cameras, Diwata-2 will host enhanced resolution cameras. The SMI, is equipped with an upgraded enhanced spatial resolution camera allowing the satellite to produce sharper images than the Diwata-1. It will also have deployable solar panels to power the satellite's payloads.

== Launch and mission ==
The satellite was targeted by the DOST to be deployed as early as the second quarter of 2018. The projected launch date was later adjusted at least twice; June 2018 and later pushed forward to fourth quarter of 2018.

It was announced that on October 26, 2018, the satellite would be launched to space via the H-IIA from Japan at the Tanegashima Space Center at around 13:08 and 13:20 (JST). Unlike Diwata-1, Diwata-2 will be directly deployed from the rocket that will carry it from space and not from the International Space Station like its predecessor. The satellite, which piggybacked on the bigger Japanese satellite Gosat-2 will be propelled to an elevation of 620 km (390 mi) above sea level.

On October 29, 2018, the satellite was launched directly into orbit at 13:51 (UTC+9). Communication between the satellite and the DOST-ASTI's ground station in Quezon City was first established on October 29 at 21:52 (UTC+8).

Diwata-2 will have the same mission as its predecessor, Diwata-1. It has a Sun-synchronous orbit having been equipped with an experimental Sun sensor which would allow the operators to determine the position of the satellite in respective to the Sun and it will orbit at an altitude of 620 km (390 mi) above sea level. It will also have a fixed visit interval time unlike its predecessor, meaning it will hover above the same position on Earth for every 16 days. The satellite has a projected life expectancy of five years.

Diwata-2 carries an amateur radio payload and was designated as PO-101 by AMSAT. It is designated with the amateur call sign DW4TA by the National Telecommunications Commission of the Philippines.

== See also ==
- Agila-2
- Space program of the Philippines
