= Maya-2 =

Nanosatellite filipino spacecraft

- Mission type: Technology demonstration
- COSPAR ID: 1998-067SF
- SATCAT no.: 47929

Spacecraft properties
- Spacecraft type: 1U CubeSat
- Launch mass: 1.3 kg (2.9 lb)
- Dimensions: 10 cm × 10 cm × 10 cm (3.9 in × 3.9 in × 3.9 in)
- Power: watts

Start of mission
- Launch date: 20 February 2021, 17:36:50 UTC
- Rocket: Antares
- Launch site: Wallops Island MARS, LP-0A
- Deployed from: ISS
- Deployment date: 14 March 2021, 11:20 UTC

End of mission
- Disposal: Deorbited
- Decay date: July 5, 2022

Orbital parameters
- Regime: Low Earth orbit

Maya-2 was a Filipino nanosatellite. It succeeded Maya-1, the first Filipino nanosatellite, which was deorbited in November 2020.

== Background ==
Maya-2 was a nanosatellite or a 1U-class CubeSat measuring 10 cm × 10 cm × 10 cm (3.9 in × 3.9 in × 3.9 in) and weighing 1.3 kg (2.9 lb). It was the successor to Maya-1 which ended its operations on November 23, 2020. Maya-2 was developed by Filipino students sent to the Kyushu Institute of Technology (KIT) in Japan through the Department of Science and Technology's (DOST) Space Science and Technology Proliferation through University Partnerships (STeP-UP) project under the STAMINA4Space Program. This is the second Cube Satellite and the first inter-university collaboration in the country, jointly built by the University of the Philippines - Diliman (a public university), Adamson University, and Mapúa University (both private universities).

Maya-2 was developed under the fourth Joint Global Multination Birds Satellite (Birds-4) project initiated by the KIT. Under the program, two other identical CubeSats; a Paraguayan (GuaraniSat-1) and a Japanese satellite (Tsuru).

Maya-2 is part of a series of satellite named after the Chestnut munia (Lonchura atricapilla), one of the various birds known locally in the Philippines as the maya.

== Development ==
A team of three Filipino engineers, Izrael Zenar Bautista (University of the Philippines - Diliman), Mark Angelo Purio (Adamson University), and Marloun Sejera (Mapúa University) , developed Maya-2. The three are DOST scholars pursuing doctorate degrees in space engineering at KIT. Bautista is also the project manager of the Birds-4 program.

Development of Maya-2 began in 2018 but was hampered by the COVID-19 pandemic. By March 2020, Maya-2 was already in its final stage of development and by September of the same year, the satellite was already turned over to the Japan Aerospace Exploration Agency (JAXA).

== Instruments ==
The build of Maya-2 is relatively more advanced than Maya-1, its predecessor, and has off-the-shelf components. Maya-2 is equipped with instruments which was used for Maya-1 including an Automatic Packet Radio Service Digipeater. Differences from its predecessor include the use of Perovskite solar cells as a power source and a different antenna design. Maya-2 also has an active altitude control instead of the passive control used by its predecessor.

== Launch and mission ==
Maya-2 launched to the International Space Station (ISS) through Northrop Grumman's Cygnus NG-15 resupply mission. The S.S. Katherine Johnson Cygnus carrying cargo including Maya-2 was launched to space via the Antares rocket on February 20, 2021, from Pad 0A of the Mid-Atlantic Regional Spaceport in Virginia, United States. The Cygnus spacecraft made a rendezvous with the ISS two days later, berthing to the Unity module of the space station. The satellite was deployed into low Earth orbit from the ISS on March 14, 2021, at around 11:20 UTC. After a 16-month mission, Maya-2 re-entered the atmosphere on July 5, 2022.
