= Rail transportation in the Philippines =

Philippines
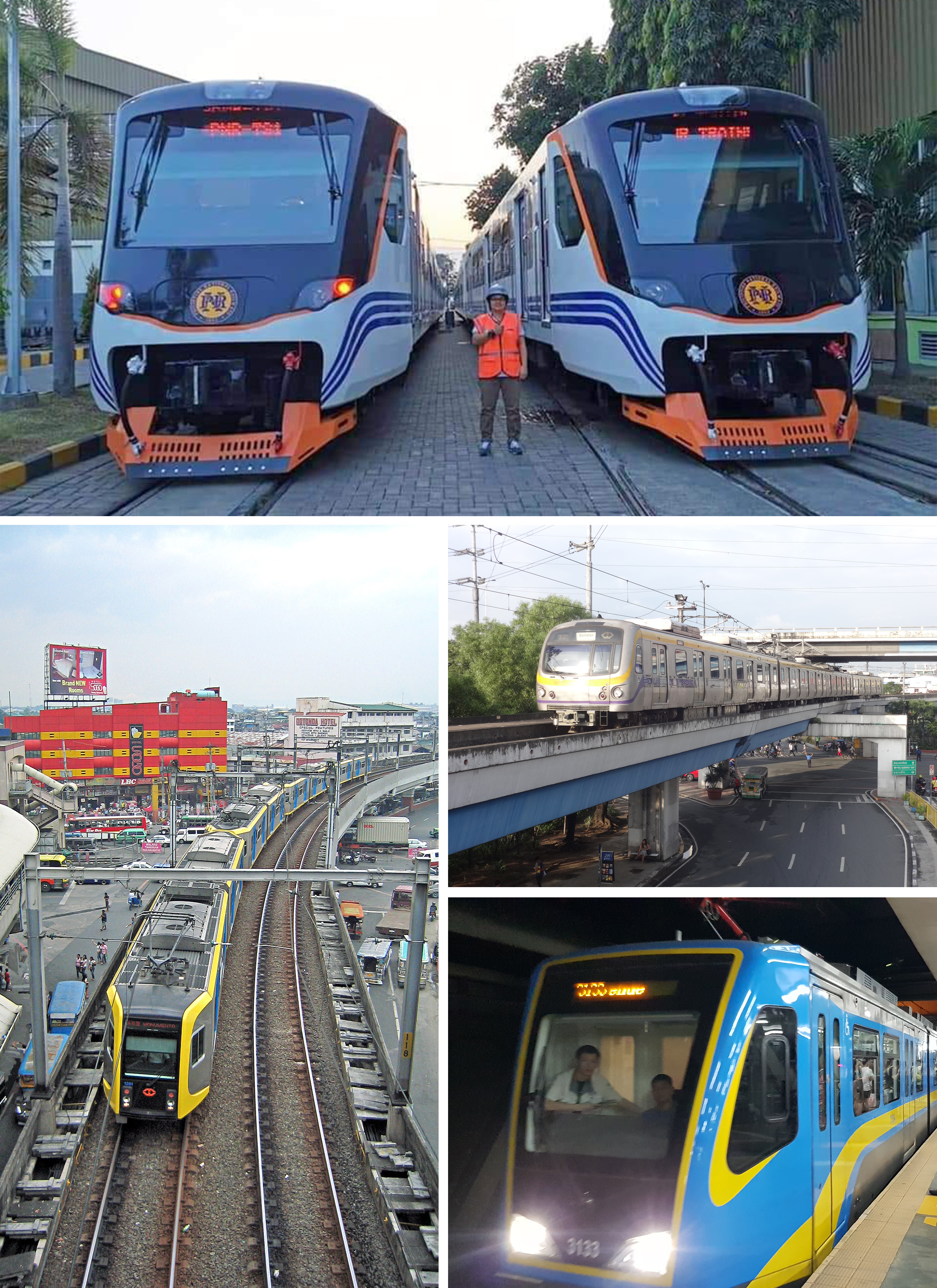
- Clockwise (from top): PNR Metro Commuter, LRT Line 2, MRT Line 3, LRT Line 1

Operation
- Major operators: DOTr (PNR, LRTA)

Statistics
- Ridership: 795,072 (2022) (Note: Combined ridership of the four currently operational lines.)

System length
- Total: 539.35 km (335.14 mi); Operational: 272.95 km (169.60 mi) (Note: Excluding the now-closed PNR Metro Commuter Line.) (Note: Operational length. With the completion of the NSCR, another 147 km (91 mi) of electrified double-track will be added.) (Note: Does not include MRT and LRT lines under construction.)
- Double track: 59.23 km (36.80 mi)
- Electrified: 54.15 km (33.65 mi)

Track gauge
- 1,067 mm (3 ft 6 in): 403.3 km (250.6 mi)
- 1,435 mm (4 ft 8 1/2 in): 60.2 km (37.4 mi) (Note: Around 2,860 km (1,780 mi) of standard-gauge tracks will be built for the North–South Commuter Railway, PNR South Main Line, Mindanao Railway and Clark–Subic freight line.)

Electrification
- 750 V DC: 42.6 km (26.5 mi)
- 1,500 V DC: 17.6 km (10.9 mi)

Features
- No. of stations: 61 (operational)
- Max elevation: 208.6 m (684 ft) at Camalig, Albay

Rail transportation in the Philippines is currently used mostly to transport passengers within Metro Manila and provinces of Laguna and Quezon, as well as a commuter service in the Bicol Region. Freight transport services once operated in the country, but these services were halted. However, there are plans to restore old freight services and build new lines. From a peak of 1,100 kilometers (680 mi), the country currently has a railway footprint of 533.14 kilometers (331.28 mi), of which only 129.85 kilometers (80.69 mi) are operational as of 2026, including all the urban rail lines. World War II, natural calamities, underspending, and neglect have all contributed to the decline of the Philippine railway network. In the 2019 Global Competitiveness Report, the Philippines has the lowest efficiency score among other Asian countries in terms of efficiency of train services, receiving a score of 2.4, and ranking 86th out of 101 countries globally. The government is currently expanding the railway network up to 1,900 kilometers (1,200 mi) by 2022 through numerous projects.

The Philippine railway network consists of two commuter lines provided by the Philippine National Railways (PNR) and three urban mass transit lines operated by the Light Rail Transit Authority and Metro Rail Transit Corporation, all of which are located in Luzon. Within the last century, there were operating intercity rail lines extending from Manila both north and south operated by PNR. There were also lines on the Panay and Cebu islands, operated by Panay Railways, which currently does not own rolling stock or rail, only property. There were also short industrial railways in Negros Island operated by sugar mills such as the Hawaiian-Philippines Company.

== History ==
=== Luzon ===
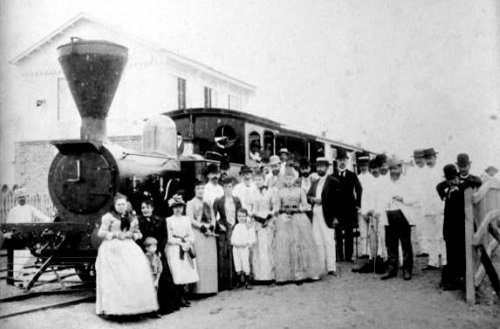
The "Ferrocarril de Manila a Dagupan" (ca. 1885).

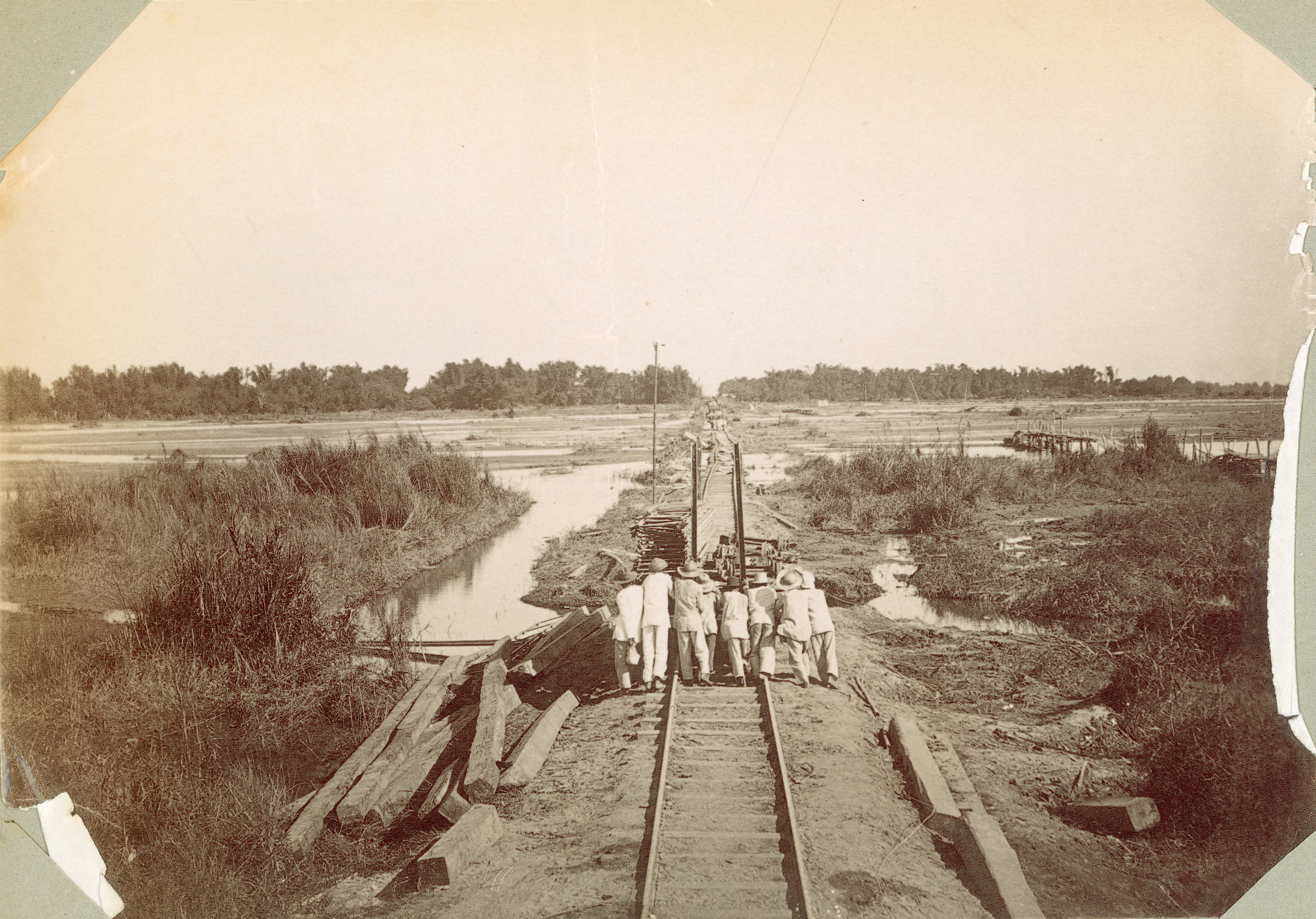
Repair work on a railway line in Manila, circa pre-1900

There has been rail transport in the Philippines for over 120 years. On June 25, 1875, King Alfonso XII of Spain promulgated a Royal Decree directing the Office of the Inspector of Public Works of the Philippines to submit a general plan for railroads on Luzon. The plan, which was submitted five months later by Don Eduardo Lopez Navarro, was entitled Memoria Sobre el Plan General de Ferrocarriles en la Isla de Luzón, and was promptly approved. A concession for the construction of a railway line from Manila to Dagupan was granted to Don Edmundo Sykes of the Ferrocarril de Manila-Dagupan on June 1, 1887. The construction and running of the railway was done by Manila Railway Company Ltd that was a British owned company. The first rail tracks were laid in 1891 and its first commercial run was in 1892.

With the American takeover of the Philippines, the Philippine Commission allowed the Manila Electric Railroad and Light Company (Meralco) to take over the properties of the Compañia de los Tranvias de Filipinas, with the first of twelve mandated electric tranvia (tram) lines operated by Meralco opening in Manila in 1905. At the end of the first year around 63 kilometers (39 mi) of track had been laid. A five-year reconstruction program was initiated in 1920, and by 1924, 170 cars serviced many parts of the city and its outskirts. Although it was an efficient system for the city's 220,000 inhabitants, by the 1930s the streetcar network had stopped expanding.

At the Tutuban Central Terminal in a bustling district of old Manila was the terminal of the Philippine National Railways for two lines, to the north and to the south. From the center of Manila towards Baguio in the north, the line ended in San Fernando, La Union while the south line stopped in Legazpi in the Bicol region. To and from these points it carried people and their goods, their trade and livelihood.

In 1936, the first standard-gauge railway was introduced to the Philippines in the form of two Climax locomotives for the Dahican Lumber Company (DALCO). These were originally built in 1917 for the San Joaquin and Eastern Railroad in California and were sold after their closure in 1933. In July 1941, a 3T type Shay locomotive was also acquired from the Finkbine-Guild Lumber Company. The status of this short-line railroad after the war remains unknown.

Most of the improvements on the rail network were destroyed during Japanese invasion of the Philippines during the World War II. Of the more than a thousand route-kilometers before the war, only 452 were operational after it. For several years after the war, work was undertaken on what could be salvaged of the railroad system. By the war's end, the tram network was also damaged beyond repair amid a city that lay in ruins. It was dismantled and jeepneys became the city's primary form of transportation, plying the routes once served by the tram lines. With the return of buses and cars to the streets, traffic congestion became a problem.

==== Decline and closure ====
Under-invested 'yung train system natin, eh. We spend so much on roads, we don't spend on trains. We need to go back to those existing train services and say, We need to up it and reinvest. We need to go build more and then, we also need to invest in the other modes - bus, jeeps and everything else, hindi lang cars.

— Benjamin de la Peña, on the country's train system being under-invested.

Due to natural disasters and a lack of government support, railways began to decline in the post-war period. The funding during the 1970s was shifted to road-based infrastructure, such as the Philippine highway network. The PNR later became the attached agency of the then-Ministry of Transportation and Communications (now DOTr).

Some services began to close in 1984, with the North Main Line being cut short to Paniqui, Tarlac. It was again shortened to Meycauayan in 1988. The eruption of Mount Pinatubo would result in the closure of the entire line in 1991. The commuter services started in 1990, with a short extension to Malolos, but they were shut down in 1997. The South Main Line was also closed due to natural disasters, including the eruption of Mayon Volcano in 1993 and Typhoons Milenyo and Reming in 2006. This was also closed in October 2012 due to a derailment incident in Sariaya, Quezon and the ongoing disrepair of typhoon-damaged bridges. This would later close again in 2014, then in 2017.

Since then, the train system has been underinvested and the country has spent much more on road projects. Long, winding roads were made from these abandoned railways.

As noted by Robert Siy Jr., a co-convenor of the Move As One Coalition, while railways are beneficial, they require significant financial investment and have lengthy construction timelines.

Move As One also argue that instead of pouring the majority of public funds into capital-intensive railway systems, the government should redirect funding toward more immediate, accessible transport solutions, such as pedestrian and cycling infrastructure, upgraded bus terminals, and robust service contracting to directly support local transport operators.

==== Introduction of rapid transit ====
In 1966, the Philippine government granted a franchise to Philippine Monorail Transport Systems (PMTS) for the operation of an inner-city monorail. The monorail's feasibility was still being evaluated when the government asked the Japan International Cooperation Agency (JICA) to conduct a separate transport study. Prepared between 1971 and 1973, the JICA study proposed a series of circumferential and radial roads, an inner-city rapid transit system, a commuter railway, and an expressway with three branches. The master plan would be known as the Urban Transport Study for the Manila Metropolitan Area (UTSMMA). After further examination, many recommendations were adopted; however, none of them involved rapid transit and the monorail was never built. PMTS' franchise subsequently expired in 1974.

Another study was performed between 1976 and 1977, this time by Freeman Fox and Associates and funded by the World Bank. It originally suggested a street-level railway, but its recommendations were revised by the newly formed Ministry of Transportation and Communications (now the DOTr). The ministry instead called for an elevated system because of the city's many intersections.

MMETROPLAN disagreed with several of the assumptions and proposals of UTSMMA. For one, Freeman, Fox—and the World Bank—did not feel that the heavy rail transit advocated by the Japanese was suitable to Manila's conditions. “It would be hopelessly uneconomic,” they concluded, arguing against any form of segregated mass transit system. The report also says "These results are conclusive, and are unlikely to be changed by any circumstances or reasonable assumptions…it is clear that any other fully segregated public transport system, whether light rail or busway, would also be uneconomic. As such systems would require the appropriation of most, if not all, of the available funds for all transport (including highways) in Metro Manila for the foreseeable future, and as there is not other rationale for their implementation, they have been rejected from further consideration.”

President Ferdinand Marcos created the Light Rail Transit Authority (LRTA) in 1980. The first lady Imelda Marcos, then governor of Metro Manila and minister of human settlements, became its first chairman. Construction of LRT Line 1 started in September 1981, test-run in March 1984, and the first half of the line from Baclaran to Central Terminal opened on December 1, 1984. The second half, from Central Terminal to Monumento, opened on May 12, 1985. Overcrowding and poor maintenance took its toll a few years after opening. With Japan's ODA amounting to 75 billion yen in total, the construction of LRT Line 2 began in 1997, and the first section of the line, from Santolan to Araneta Center-Cubao, was opened on April 5, 2003. The second section, from Araneta Center-Cubao to Legarda, was opened exactly a year later, with the entire line being fully operational by October 2004. During that time Line 1 was modernized. Automated fare collection systems using magnetic stripe plastic tickets were installed; air-conditioned trains added; pedestrian walkways between Lines 1, 2, and the privately operated 3 were completed. In 2005, the LRTA made a profit of ₱68 million, the first time the agency made a profit since the Line 1 became operational in 1984.

==== Rehabilitation ====
In the early 2000s, the government worked to rehabilitate rail transportation in the country, including the Philippine National Railways, through various investments and projects. Total reconstruction of rail bridges and tracks, including replacement of the current 35-kilogram (77-pound) track with newer 50-kilogram (110-pound) tracks and the refurbishing of stations, were part of the rehabilitation and expansion process. Much of those plans such as the Northrail Project were controversial and were never completed, due to allegations of being overpriced and anomalous.

MRT Line 3, which deteriorated since 2014 due to poor maintenance, underwent rehabilitation from 2019 to 2021, restoring it to its original high-grade state.

==== Expansion ====
As part of the government's recent investments in transportation in the country, numerous projects are ongoing to expand and rehabilitate the railways in Luzon. Projects include the North–South Commuter Railway, a 180-kilometer (110 mi) line from New Clark City in Capas, Tarlac to Calamba, Laguna, the Metro Manila Subway, a 36-kilometer (22 mi) underground rapid transit line from Quezon City to Taguig and NAIA Terminal 3, the LRT Line 1 Cavite Extension, which would extend the existing line from Baclaran to Niog, the MRT-7 would connect North Avenue to San Jose Del Monte, and the MRT-4 would connect Ortigas Center to Taytay.

Sources in the DOTr say it's unlikely that railway projects will finish during President Bongbong Marcos' term, as a Department of Justice (DOJ) legal opinion has led to an indefinite pause on right of way acquisitions, except for ongoing expropriation cases and subterranean land. Under Philippine law, specifically Republic Act 10752, the government must meet certain conditions before compensating those affected by infrastructure projects.

The Right of Way Act should take priority over the government's loan agreements with project funders like the Japan International Cooperation Agency (JICA) and the Asian Development Bank (ADB), who are behind most of the infrastructure projects. Even though the law says informal settlers need to be relocated, it's not clear if they'll get compensated for the replacement cost of their structures. This could lead to issues with JICA guidelines, especially along the route of the PNR that the NSCR will follow. According to the source, there was an effort to fix this issue in the proposed amendment to the Right of Way Act, but lawmakers didn't manage to pass the bill before the 19th Congress took a break for elections.

Prior to its closure, the current PNR service was also being expanded, with the PNR Metro Commuter opening stations in Caloocan and Malabon in 2018. PNR is also planning to reintroduce services to the Carmona branch line. New rolling stock was also acquired from PT INKA in Indonesia.

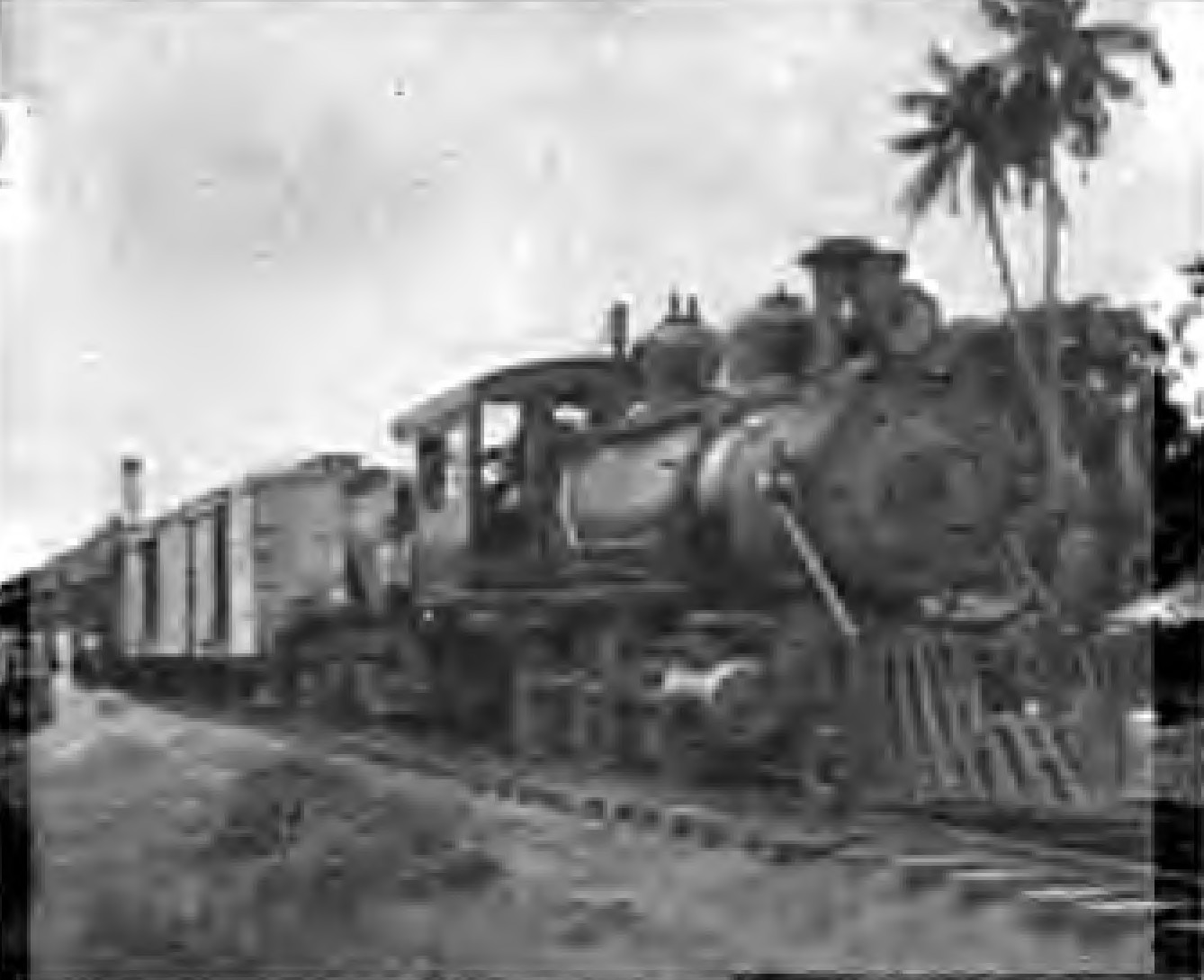
The Panay line in 1917.

=== Panay ===
From the beginning of the American colonial period of the Philippines, the new American colonial Insular Government was committed to building new railways. The Philippine Railway Company, predecessor of the current Panay Railways, was incorporated in Connecticut on March 5, 1906. It was part of a "Manila syndicate", a collection of Philippine infrastructure companies including the Manila Electric Railway and Light Company, incorporated in New Jersey, the Manila Construction Company, and the Manila Suburban Railways Company. Later the Philippines Railways Construction Company was added. Cornelius Vanderbilt and William Salomon, among other leading American railwaymen sat on the board.

On May 28, 1906, the Philippine Commission granted to the Philippine Railway Corporation a concession to construct railways on the islands of Panay, Negros and Cebu.

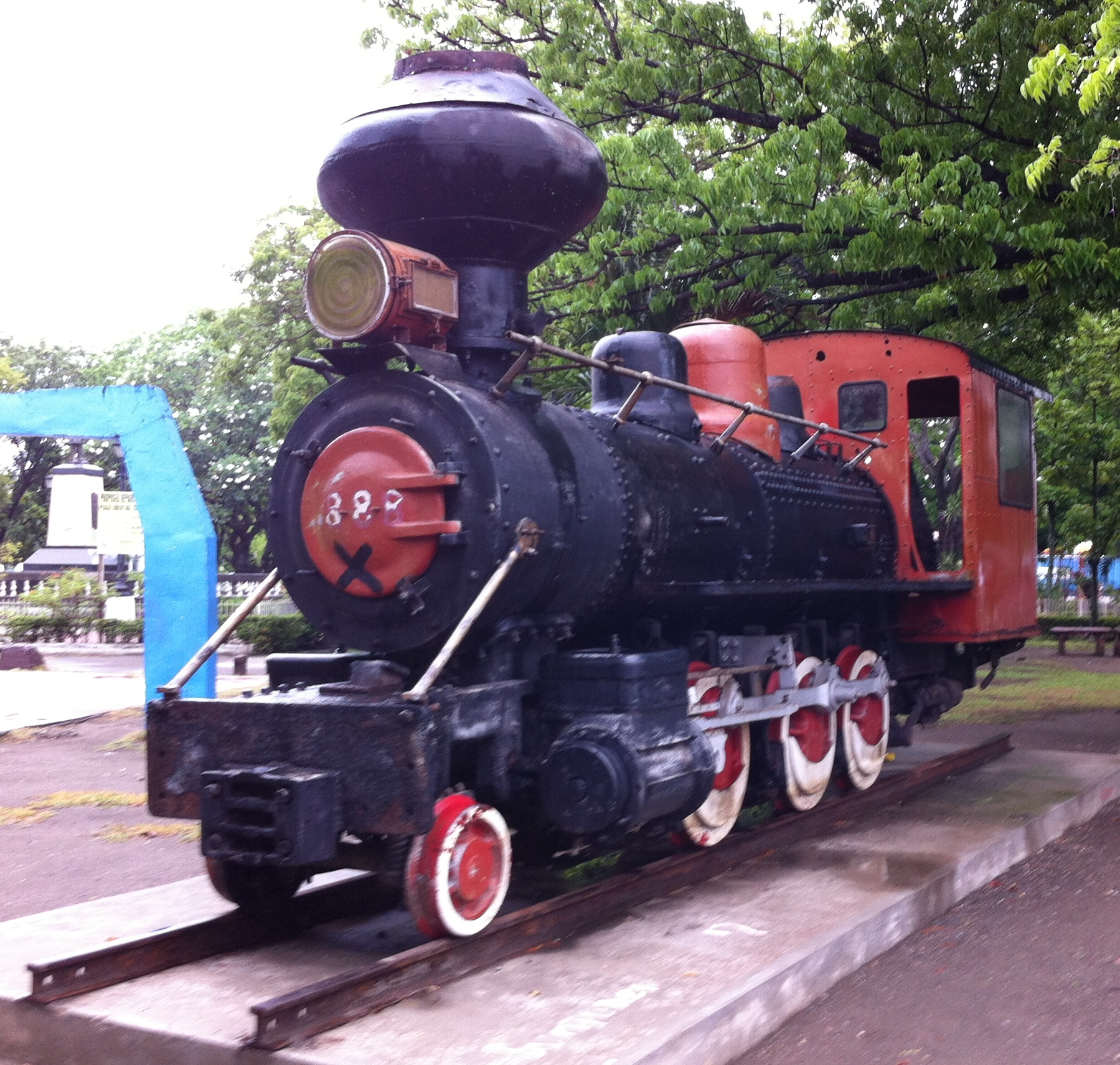
Engine of the Panay Railways on display in a plaza of Iloilo City.

Construction began on a railroad from Iloilo City to Roxas City in Capiz with crews working from both cities and meeting in the middle in 1907. Operations began immediately upon completion. In 1985, passenger operations ceased while in 1989 freight operations ceased.

=== Cebu ===
The Philippine Railway Company, along with operating the Panay line, operated a line in Cebu from 1911 to 1942, when operations ceased because of the Japanese occupation of the Philippines during World War II. The line ran from Danao south through Cebu City to Argao. The line was built by the related Philippine Railways Construction Company.

== Services ==
=== Commuter rail ===
The Philippines currently has two operational commuter lines: the PNR Inter-Provincial Commuter between Laguna and Quezon and the PNR Bicol Commuter Line, located in the Bicol Region. All of these lines are operated by Philippine National Railways.

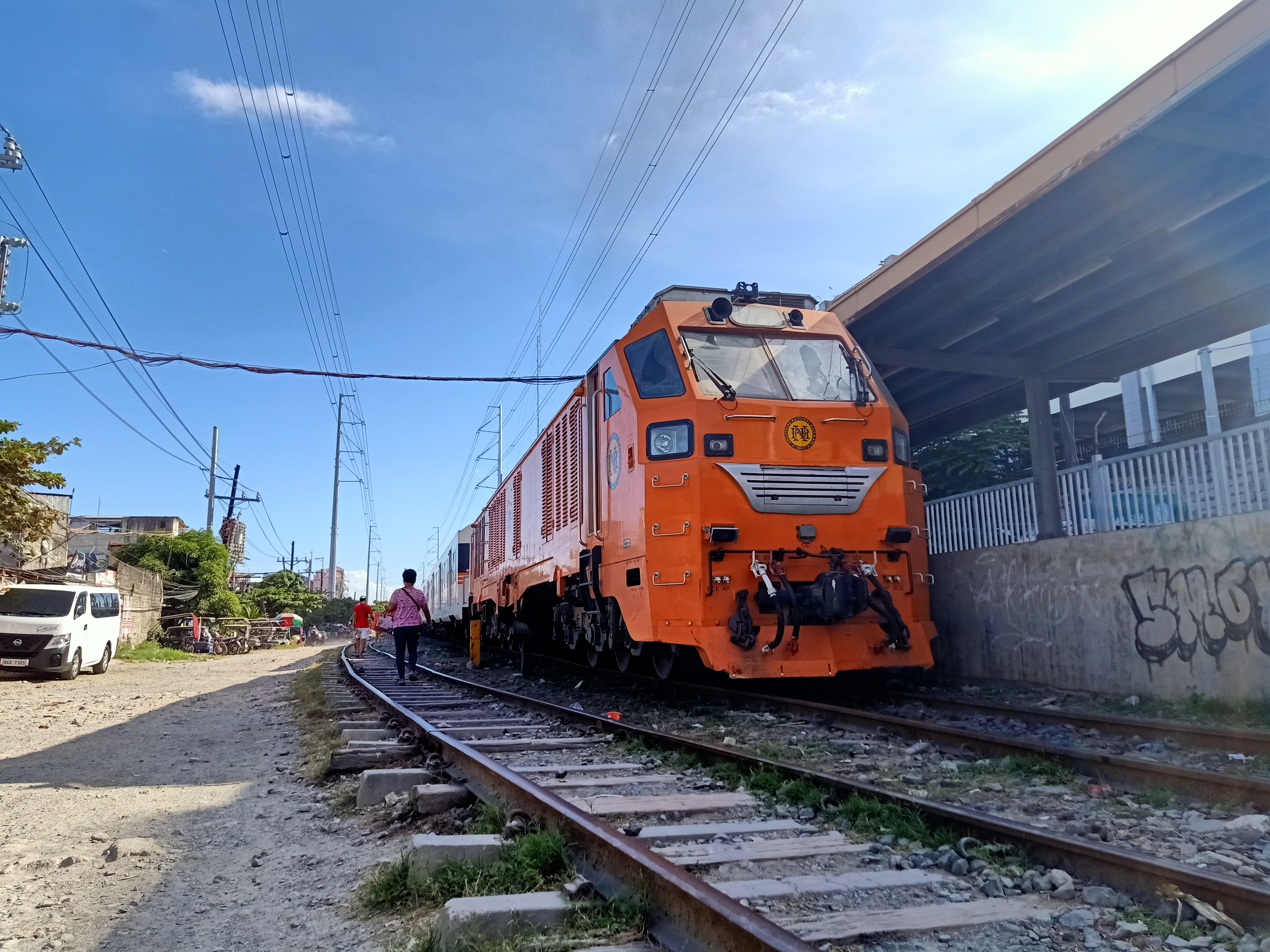
A PNR 9000 class and 8300 class at Alabang station.

==== PNR Metro Commuter Line ====
The PNR Metro Commuter Line was a commuter rail line operated by the Philippine National Railways. It was first inaugurated as the Metro Manila Commuter Service in 1970 and originally served the North Main Line and the South Main Line, as well as the defunct Carmona and Guadalupe branch lines. Since then, it adopted several names such as Metrotrak and Metrotren, before its present name was adopted in the late 2000s. The line was also nicknamed the Orange Line due to its designation in the 1970s.

The line had 36 stations serving Metro Manila and Laguna. It was divided into two sections which met at Tutuban station in Tondo, Manila. The Metro North Commuter section ran from Tutuban to Governor Pascual station in Malabon and was colored light green on the system map of PNR. On the other hand, the Metro South Commuter section ran from Tutuban to IRRI station in Los Baños, Laguna and was colored orange on the system map of PNR. Some stations connected to LRT Line 1 and 2, and MRT Line 3.

The line ceased operations on March 28, 2024, to give way for the construction of the North–South Commuter Railway Extension Project (NSCR-Ex). Despite this, plans are underway to reinstate its tracks at a later date following the completion of the NSCR.

==== PNR Inter-Provincial Commuter ====
The Inter-Provincial Commuter is a 44-kilometer (27 mi) commuter and regional rail service between San Pablo, Laguna and Lucena, Quezon. It has been proposed as part of the PNR South Long Haul project in 2019. The service had its first trial run on February 14, 2022, and was reopened on June 26.

==== Bicol Commuter ====
The Bicol Commuter service is a commuter rail service in the Bicol Region, between stations in Tagkawayan, Quezon, and Legazpi, Albay, with Naga in Camarines Sur acting as a central terminal. It has three services: Tagkawayan-Naga (suspended), Sipocot-Naga (operational), and Naga-Legazpi (operational)

The service was first launched on September 16, 2009, as Tagkawayan-Naga and Naga-Ligao. The trains were planned to make seven trips a day, alternating between Tagkawayan, Sipocot, Naga City and Legazpi. All services used KiHa 52 in revised blue livery.

However, after further reductions, only the service between Sipocot and Naga was operating by December 2013. Service resumed between Naga and Legazpi on September 18, 2015, with one train a day. However, services were again cut in April 2017 due to an absence of rolling stock, which was worsened by a succession of typhoons that damaged railroads in the Bicol region.

Definitive plans to restore the entire route from Sipocot, Naga and Legazpi were bared with an inspection trip from Tutuban on September 20, 2019, with a rerailment crew, including certain areas of Quezon Province, in preparation of the restoration of more routes previously suspended. First to be restored was the operation of the Naga-Sipocot segment of the Bicol Commuter service in 2022. On the 31st of July 2022, the PNR resumed operations between Ligao and Naga, with two daily trips in service. The Naga–Legazpi route was reopened on December 27, 2023, six years after its suspension in April 2017 due to insufficient trains.

As of 2024, the train used for the Naga-Legazpi Route is the 8300 class coaches pulled by a INKA CC300 locomotive. While the 8000 class DMU is used in the Naga - Sipocot Line.

=== Rapid transit ===
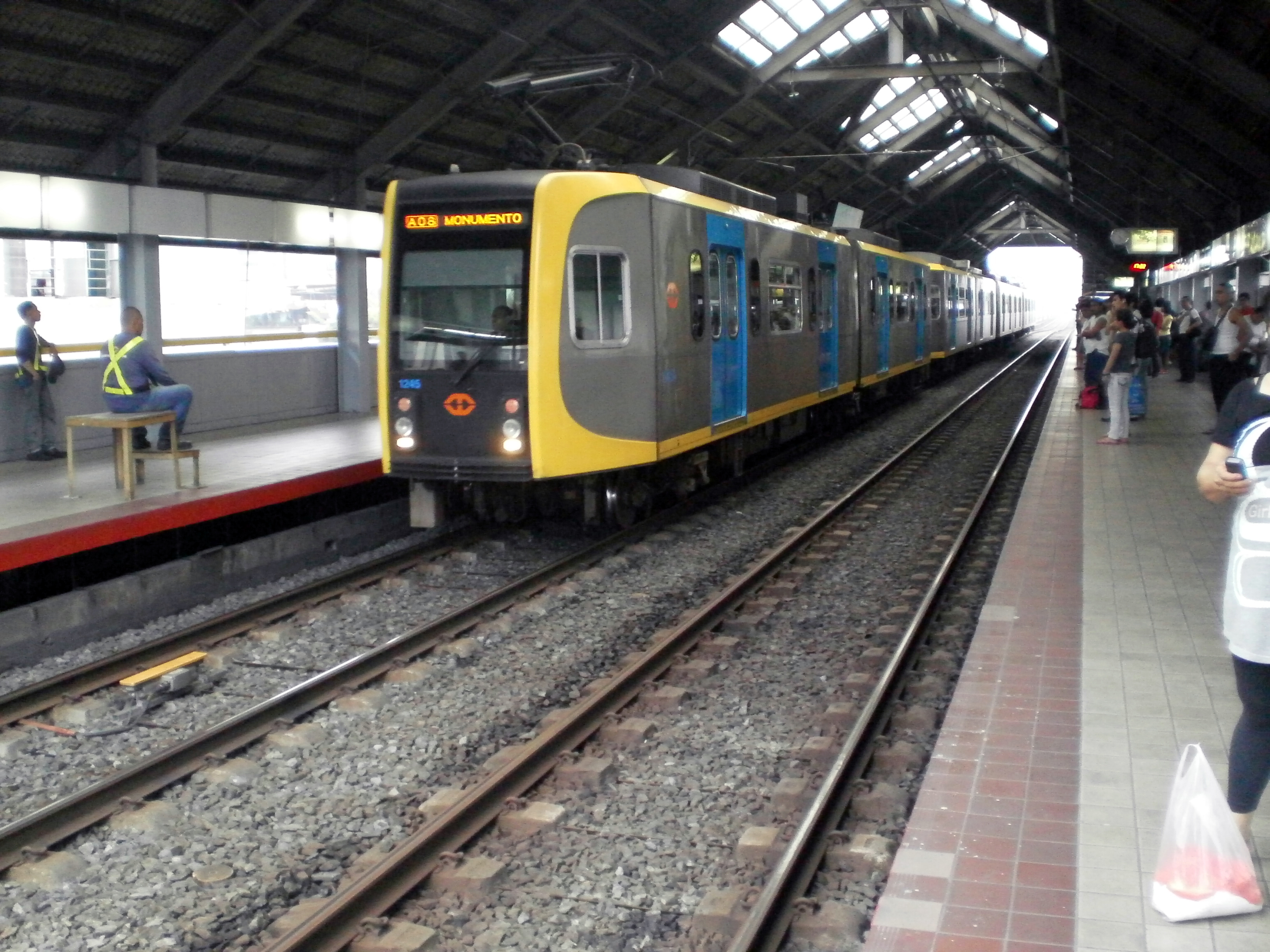
An LRT Line 1 train of the LRTA System at the Blumentritt Station.

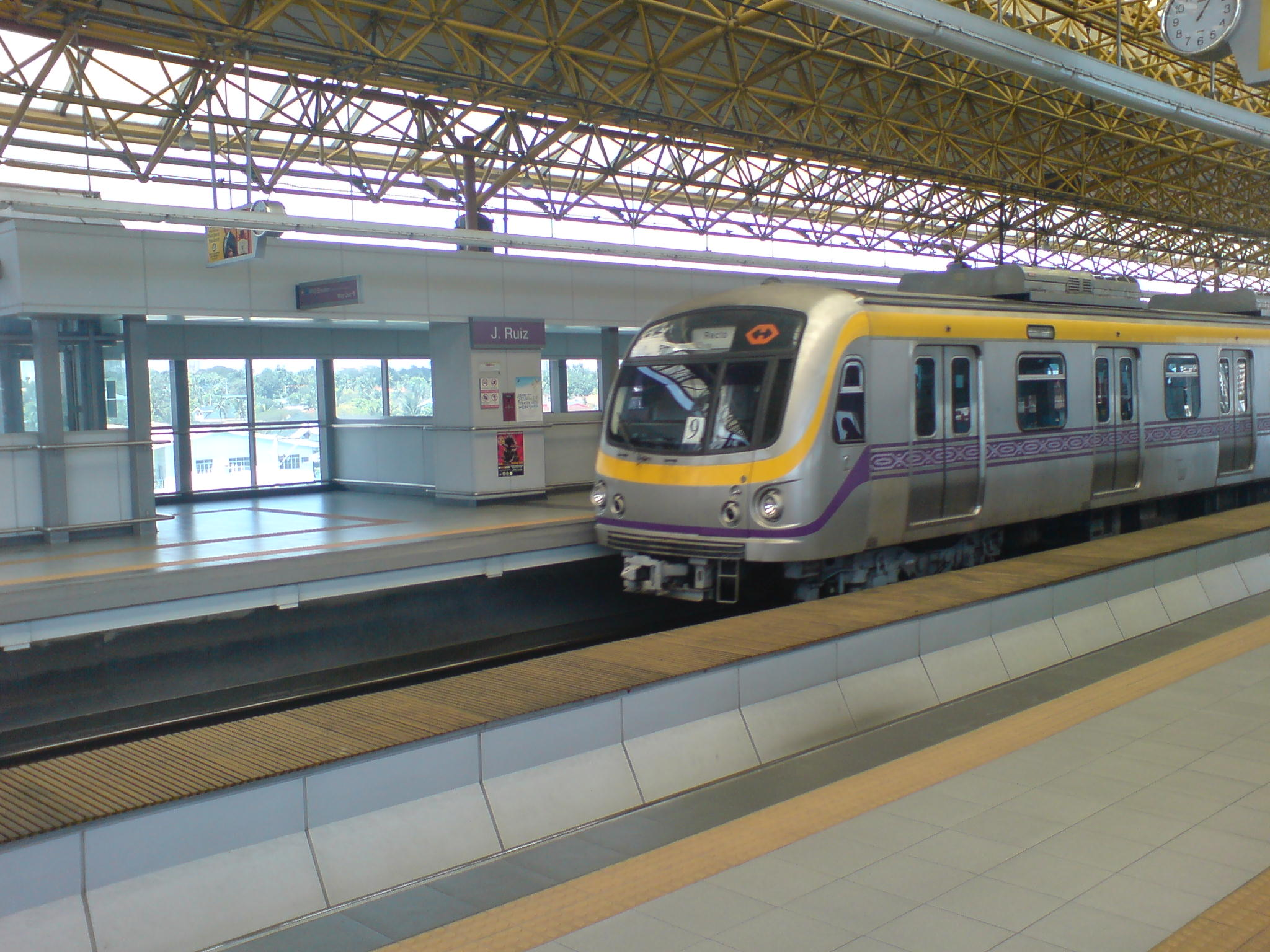
An LRT Line 2 train at the platform of the J. Ruiz Station.

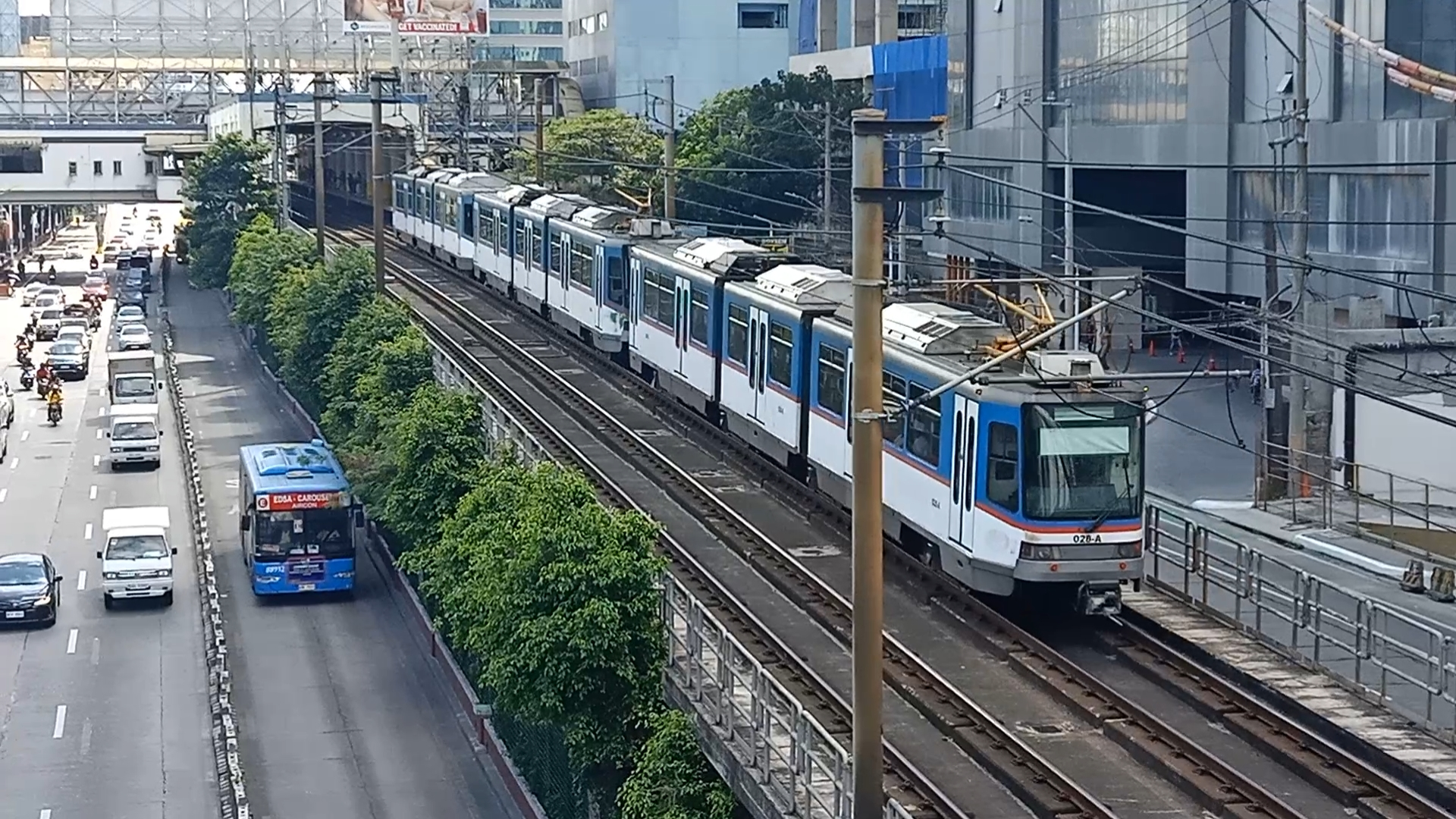
An MRT Line 3 train near Kamuning station.

There are two rapid transit systems operating in the country: the Manila Light Rail Transit System, and the Manila Metro Rail System, both serving passengers in Metro Manila. Many passengers who ride the systems also take various forms of road-based public transport, such as buses, to and from a station to reach their intended destination. Beep, a contactless smart card, is used to pay fares for the lines.

==== Manila Light Rail Transit System ====
The Manila Light Rail Transit System, commonly known as the LRT, is an urban rail transit system that primarily serves Metro Manila, Philippines. Although categorized as a light rail system because it originally used light rail vehicles, it presently has characteristics of a rapid transit system, such as high passenger throughput, exclusive right-of-way, and later use of full metro rolling stock. The LRT is jointly-operated by the Light Rail Transit Authority (LRTA), a government corporation attached to the Department of Transportation (DOTr), and the Light Rail Manila Corporation (LRMC). Along with the Manila Metro Rail Transit System and the Metro Commuter Line of the Philippine National Railways, the system makes up Metro Manila's rail infrastructure.

The LRT's 43.5-kilometer-route (27.0 mi) is mostly elevated and consists of two lines and 38 stations. Line 1, also called the Green Line (formerly known as the Yellow Line), opened in 1984 and travels a north–south route. Line 2, the Purple Line (briefly referred to as the Blue Line), was completed in 2004 and runs east–west. The original Line 1 was built as a no-frills means of public transport and lacks some features and comforts, but the newer Line 2 was built with additional standards and criteria in mind such as barrier-free access. In 2024, the system served 470,000 passengers on average. Security guards at each station conduct inspections and provide assistance. A reusable plastic magnetic ticketing system has replaced the previous token-based system in 2001, and the Flash Pass was introduced as a step towards a more integrated transportation system. In 2015, the plastic magnetic tickets were replaced with the Beep, a contactless smart card, introduced to provide a common ticketing to 3 rail lines and some bus lines.

Many passengers who ride the system also take various forms of road-based public transport, such as buses and jeepneys, to and from a station to reach their intended destination. Although it aims to reduce traffic congestion and travel times in the metropolis, the transportation system has only been partially successful due to the rising number of motor vehicles and rapid urbanization. The network's expansion is set on resolving this problem.

==== Manila Metro Rail Transit System ====
The Manila Metro Rail Transit System, commonly known as the MRT, is a rapid transit system that primarily serves Metro Manila, Philippines. Along with the Manila Light Rail Transit System and the Metro Commuter Line of the Philippine National Railways, the system makes up Metro Manila's rail infrastructure.

As of 2026, the MRT's 16.9-kilometer-route consists of 1 line and 13 stations (in operation). The first and the only line currently in operation, MRT Line 3, was opened in December 1999 and completed in July 2000, currently owned by the Department of Transportation (DOTr), after the 25-year build-lease-transfer agreement between DOTr and the Metro Rail Transit Corporation expired in July 2025.

Since then, most of the newly proposed rapid rail lines within Metro Manila that are not under the jurisdiction of the Light Rail Transit Authority are associated with the "MRT" brand. This includes the Metro Manila Subway (Line 9) and the elevated Line 7 which are being built as of January 2023.

== Operators ==
=== Philippine National Railways ===
The Philippine National Railways (PNR) (Filipino: Pambansang Daang-bakal ng Pilipinas; Spanish: Ferrocarril Nacional de Filipinas) is a state-owned railway company in the Philippines which operates one commuter rail service between Laguna and Quezon, and local services between Sipocot, Naga, Lupi, and Legazpi in the Bicol Region. It is an attached agency of the Department of Transportation, formerly known as the Ferrocaril Manila-Dagupan Line, and less well-known Manila Railroad (MRR).

Philippine National Railways traces its roots to the Ferrocarril de Manila-Dagupan, founded on November 24, 1892, during the Spanish colonial period, and later becoming the Manila Railroad Company (MRR) during the American colonial period. Founded on June 20, 1964, by virtue of Republic Act No. 4156, the PNR used to operate over 1,100 km (684 mi) of route from La Union to the Bicol Region. However, neglect reduced the railway's service, and persistent problems with informal settlers in the 1990s and natural disasters in the 2000s contributed further to its decline. The government is currently in the process of reinvesting in the railway through numerous projects set to revive defunct lines and create new ones. However, multiple delays, such as funding issues and project changes, are currently hindering their implementation.

=== Light Rail Transit Authority ===
The Light Rail Transit Authority (LRTA) is a public transport operator that is responsible for the construction, operation, maintenance and/or lease of Manila Light Rail Transit System in the Philippines. It is organized as a government-owned and controlled corporation under the Department of Transportation (DOTr) as an attached agency.

=== Light Rail Manila Corporation ===
Light Rail Manila Corporation (LRMC) is a rail service company based in Pasay, Metro Manila, Philippines. It is a consortium of companies engaged in the operation and maintenance of the Manila Light Rail Transit System Line 1 (Line 1) since September 2015. The consortium is composed of Metro Pacific Investments Corporation, Sumitomo Corporation's Metro Pacific Light Rail Corp. (MPLRC); AC Infrastructure Holdings Corp. (a subsidiary of Ayala Corporation) through an intermediate entity Light Rail Manila Holdings, Inc.; and Macquarie Infrastructure Holdings (Philippines) Pte. Ltd.

=== Metro Rail Transit Corporation ===
The Metro Rail Transit Corporation (MRTC) is a private consortium organized in June 1995. The consortium is composed of seven Filipino-owned companies: Fil-Estate Management Inc (now Metro Global Holdings Corporation), Ayala Land Inc, Ramcar Inc, Greenfield Development Corporation (Unilab Group), Anglo-Philippine Holdings Corporation (National Book Store Group), Allante Realty and Development Inc, and DBH Inc. The Metro Rail Transit Corporation owns the Manila Metro Rail Transit System Line 3 running along the EDSA corridor. MRTC was the original contractor for the EDSA MRT-3 Project. It runs the MRT-3 in coordination with the Department of Transportation under a 25-year Build-Lease-Transfer contract or BLT Agreement, where it expired on July 15, 2025.

=== Panay Railways ===
Panay Railways, Inc. is a government-owned and controlled corporation of the Philippines that formerly operated railway systems on the islands of Panay and Cebu. It is headquartered in La Paz, Iloilo City, and is a subsidiary of Phividec Railways, Inc. under the Philippine Veterans Investment Development Corporation (PHIVIDEC). While Panay Railways currently does not operate any trains, it leases its property, and the generated revenue is utilized to cover personnel and administrative costs associated with maintaining its assets.

The company has been owned in succession by the Rehabilitation Finance Corporation which became the Development Bank of the Philippines (1945–74), and then it was sold to the PHIVIDEC (1974–79). In 1979, management and operations were transferred to the Philippine Sugar Commission (PHILSUCOM) which changed the company's name to the current Panay Railways, Inc. On September 26, 1995, PHIVIDEC re-acquired ownership of Panay Railways from the Sugar Regulatory Administration, PHILSUCOM's successor.

There have been feasibility studies and proposals to revive the railways, including discussions about opening the company to foreign ownership to facilitate the reconstruction of its former train lines. The reconstruction is planned to proceed in four phases: the first phase will cover the route from Iloilo City to Roxas City, the second phase will extend from Roxas City to Caticlan (Boracay) in Malay, Aklan, the third phase will extend from Caticlan to San Jose, Antique, and the fourth phase will complete the loop back to Iloilo City.

=== SMC Mass Rail Transit 7 Incorporated ===
- SMC Mass Rail Transit 7 Incorporated: previously known as the Universal LRT Corporation, the company will be the owner and operator of MRT Line 7 upon completion, under a build–operate–transfer agreement with the Department of Transportation. It is a subsidiary of San Miguel Corporation.

== Railways under construction ==
=== Commuter rail ===
==== North–South Commuter Railway ====
The North–South Commuter Railway (Note: Tagalog: Daambakal Pangmananakay na Pahilaga–Timog; Kapampangan: Dalang Bakal ning Pamanyakeng Papangulu–Mauli) (NSCR), also known as the Clark–Calamba Railway, is a 147-kilometer (91-mile) commuter rail system under construction on the island of Luzon in the Philippines. Running from New Clark City in Capas, Tarlac, to Calamba, Laguna, with 36 stations and four services, the railway is designed to improve connectivity within the Greater Manila Area and will be integrated with the railway network in the region.

Originally planned in the 1990s, the railway project has had a tumultuous history, being repeatedly halted and restarted for various reasons. The first proposals were the 32-kilometer (20-mile) "Manila–Clark rapid railway" with Spain in the 1990s, alongside the "Manila–Calabarzon Express". During the 2000s, the Northrail project with China was initiated but discontinued in 2011 due to allegations of overpricing. The railway's current incarnation began development in 2013. The project's initial phase was approved in 2015, and construction began in 2019.

Expected to cost ₱873.62 billion, the line is the most expensive railway transportation project in the country. The entire system is expected to be completed by the third quarter of 2033.

=== Rapid transit ===
==== Line extensions ====
- LRT Line 1 south extension: LRT Line 1 will be extended further south by 5.5 kilometers (3.4 mi), from its terminus in Dr. Santos station in Parañaque to Niog station in Bacoor. Construction started on September 1, 2019, and as of November 16, 2024, it is partially operational.
- LRT Line 2 west extension: LRT Line 2 will be extended by 3 kilometers (1.9 mi) westward. The west extension is projected to start by 2025.

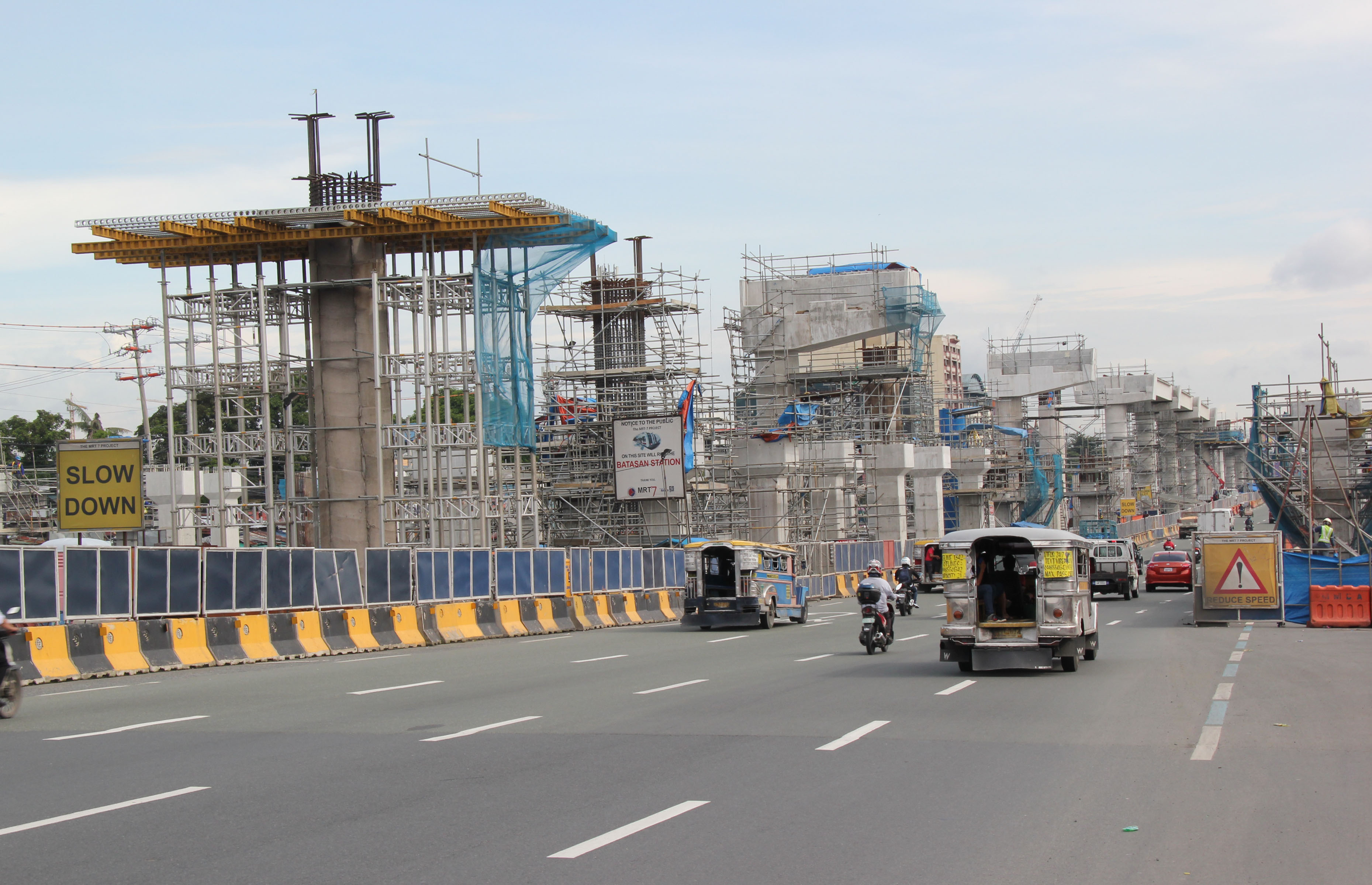
Construction of Batasan station along Commonwealth Avenue, Quezon City as of August 2018.

==== MRT Line 7 ====
Metro Rail Transit Line 7 (MRT-7) is an under-construction rapid transit line across Metro Manila in Philippines, with its phase-1 with 14-stations on 22.8 kilometers (14.2 mi) route from Bulacan (San Jose del Monte) in the northeast to Quezon City (North Triangle Common Station in North Avenue) in the southwest expected to become partially operational in 2027.

MRT-7 will be expanded to a 200-kilometer (120 mi) network in phases, including a main loop-line as an extension of the present line, as well as several other phased extensions such as the New Manila International Airport Link, the West Rail Link, Manila North Harbor-North Avenue Common Station Link, etc.

==== Metro Manila Subway ====
The Metro Rail Transit Line 9, or MRT-9, also known the Metro Manila Subway Project (MMSP), or commonly known as the Metro Manila Subway is an under-construction underground rapid transit line in Metro Manila, Philippines. The 33-kilometer (21 mi) line, which will run north–south between Valenzuela, Quezon City, Pasig, Taguig, Parañaque and Pasay, consists of 17 stations between the East Valenzuela and Bicutan stations. It will become the country's second direct airport rail link after the North–South Commuter Railway, with a branch line to Ninoy Aquino International Airport.

Dubbed as the country's "Project of the Century", the Metro Manila Subway broke ground on February 27, 2019, and construction began the following December. Subsequently, suffering delays due to the COVID-19 pandemic, the line was scheduled to fully open in 2029. The project is expected to cost ₱355.6 billion (equivalent to USD in 2017). Much of its cost is covered by a loan provided by the Japan International Cooperation Agency (JICA). However, it is unlikely to be completed during Bongbong Marcos's administration due to right of way problems; operations are expected to begin in 2032.

The Metro Manila Subway is planned to be integrated with the public transit system in Metro Manila. Passengers may take various forms of road-based public transport, such as buses and jeepneys, to and from a station to reach their intended destination. The line is designed to connect with other urban rail transit services in the region; riders may transfer to LRT Line 1, MRT Line 3, and MRT Line 7 at the nearby North Triangle Common Station, which is also currently under construction. Other connections include the existing LRT Line 2 and NSCR, as well as the MRT Line 4 and MRT Line 8.

The line is projected to serve 370,000 passengers per day in the short term, with longer term growth leading to a projected 1.5 million passengers of daily ridership.

==== Makati Intra-city Subway ====
The Makati Intra-city Subway (MkTr) was a planned underground rapid transit line to be located in Makati, Metro Manila, that will link establishments across the city's business district. Its construction was planned through a public-private partnership program between the Makati City Government and a private consortium headed by Philippine Infradev Holdings. Proponents of the subway were expected to begin construction by December 2018, and Makati Mayor Abigail Binay projects completion by 2025. The subway costed $1.8 billion (or ₱90 billion) and was expected to accommodate 500,000 passengers daily. It would have had seven stations, with connections to the existing MRT Line 3 and Pasig River Ferry Service.

The Makati Intra-city Subway was designed to complement the Metro Manila Subway (MMS), a national government project under the Department of Transportation (DOTr). Plans included interconnections between the two systems to facilitate seamless transfers for commuters. Specifically, the MkTr was expected to link with the MMS at the proposed University of Makati (UMak) station.

Construction of this project was initially put on hold after the transfer of jurisdiction of the ten EMBO barangays from Makati to Taguig was finalized in 2023. This is because its planned depot and some stations were intended to be located in the formerly disputed area, according to the original proposed alignment, thus requiring a reworking. However the project was cancelled following Infradev's withdrawal in May 2025.

== Railways planned or proposed ==
=== Rapid transit ===
==== Automated Guideway Transit System ====
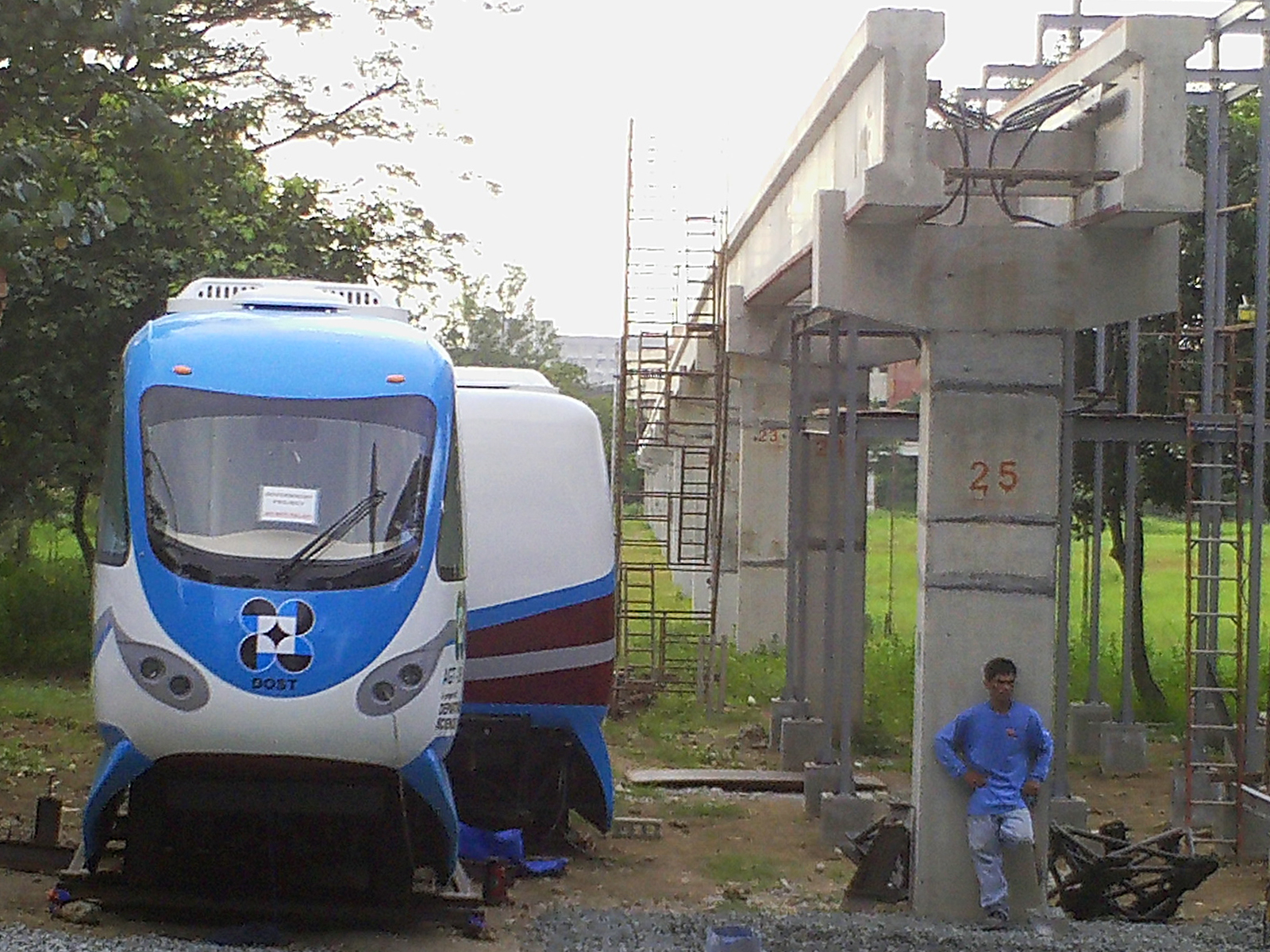
UP Diliman AGT

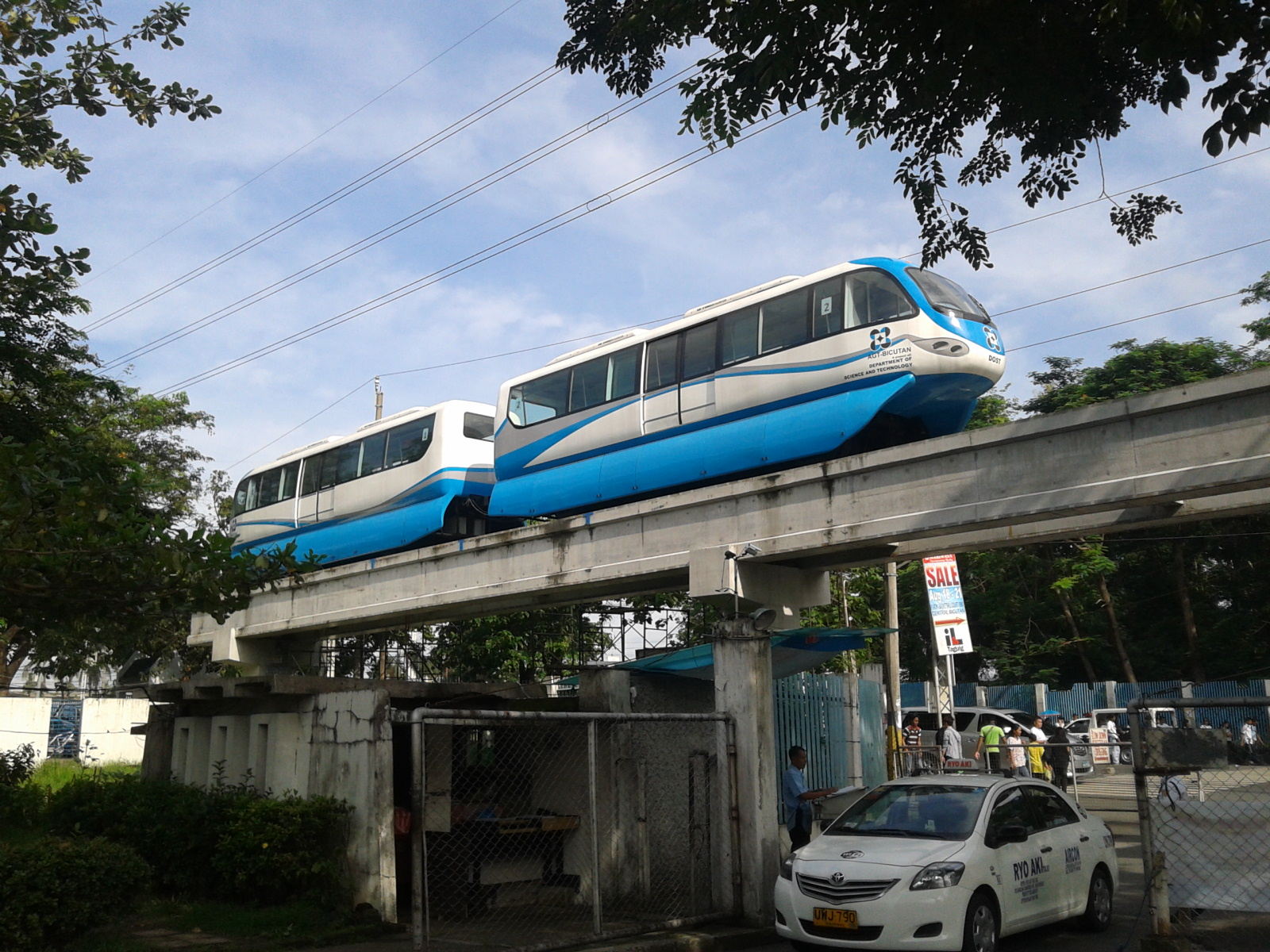
Bicutan AGT

The Department of Science and Technology has commenced a project to develop a locally designed and manufactured Automated Guideway Transit System.

- Bicutan AGT — Originally one of the two proposed AGT lines, the other being the cancelled UP Diliman AGT. It will follow the alignment of General Santos Avenue and C-6 road in southern Taguig, connecting the offices of DOST and nearby areas.

==== Monorail ====
- Baguio Monorail — A 4-km elevated monorail with 8 stations around the central business area will be funded by Metro Global Holdings Corporation through a public-private partnership.
- Davao People Mover — A 28-kilometer (17-mile) monorail project has been endorsed by the City Government of Davao to the Department of Transportation (DOTr) and Philippine National Railways (PNR).
- Iloilo Monorail — BYD, a Shenzhen-based company conducted a two-month feasibility study to construct a monorail in Iloilo. The first phase of the 20-kilometer (12-mile) system was expected to start operations by 2019. This project was shelved after 2018.
- SkyTrain (Metro Manila) — The construction of the SkyTrain is projected to cost ₱3.5 billion and is yet to commence. Infracorp will construct the monorail line for two years and planned to make the SkyTrain operational by the end of 2021. Infracorp aimed to commence Groundbreaking in Late 2020, but not update has been given as of December 7, 2020. The Monorail is also set to connect to the Makati Intra-city Subway, MRT 3 Guadalupe, and the Pasig River Ferry Service.
- Cebu Monorail — Previously the Cebu LRT, the system will have two lines. One will be Central Line passing through downtown Cebu and its neighboring areas, and the Airport Line heading towards Mactan–Cebu International Airport. It is set to open before the end of 2021.
- Pasay Monorail — A 1.89 km monorail that will connect with MRT-3 Taft Station and LRT-1 EDSA Station to SM Mall of Asia.
- Pasig City Transit Express — A 16.35-kilometer (10.16-mile) monorail that connects within the urban of Pasig City.

==== Light rail ====
- LRT Line 6 — A proposed rapid transit line in Cavite that will connect with LRT Line 1 in Bacoor and end at Dasmariñas. The project is indefinitely shelved by the national government due to space constraints along Aguinaldo Highway where it will be routed, but a private firm has presented an unsolicited proposal that modifies the alignment so to follow Bacoor Boulevard and Molino-Paliparan Road, and include 4 branches serving southern Metro Manila.
- MRT 10 — The project will be approximately 22.5 kilometers (14.0 mi) and a mostly elevated Light Railway Transit (LRT) System consisting of sixteen (16) stations along circumferential road C-5 connecting the Ninoy Aquino Terminal Airport (NAIA) Terminal 3 to Quezon City, terminating at Commonwealth Avenue with possible interchange with MRT7 at Tandang Sora Station and LRT Line 2 at Aurora Station. Trains will be stabled at the depot to be built at the UP property in Diliman, Quezon City.
- Pasig River Light Rail — A 27 km (17 mi) east–west light rail line along the Pasig River was proposed in 2019 by Hong Kong-based Kwan On Holdings and PowerChina Huadong of Hangzhou, China, and was endorsed to the Metropolitan Manila Development Authority. The line will have 22 stations running beside the river from Manila Bay to Laguna de Bay and some portions will be located beside the Pasig River Expressway.
- Cagayan de Oro Metropolitan Railway – A proposed railway system that will located on Northern Mindanao and CARAGA Regions. It has 2 phases, one of them will connect the cities of Cagayan de Oro and Butuan.

==== Heavy rail ====
- MRT Line 4 — Initially proposed as a "heavy monorail" line, the line has been revised to heavy rail in September 2022. A 12.7-kilometer (7.9-mile) elevated railway line will run from the junction of EDSA at Ortigas Center in Quezon City to Taytay, Rizal.
- MRT 8 — The Metro Rail Transit Line 8, or MRT-8 (formerly designated as MRT-9, now designated to Metro Manila Subway), also known as PNR East-West Line, is a proposed rapid transit line in the Philippines. It would be a 9-kilometer (5.6 mi) railway system connecting Sampaloc, Manila and Diliman, Quezon City via Commonwealth Avenue, Quezon Avenue, and España Boulevard. The unsolicited proposal for the project was submitted to the Philippine government by Malaysia-based construction engineering company AlloyMTD group in 2016, and is awaiting approval by the National Economic Development Authority (NEDA). According to MTD Philippines, Inc. President Patrick Nicholas David, the project would cost ₱60 billion.
- MRT 11 — The project involves the construction of an approximately 18 kilometers (11 mi) of elevated structure starting from Epifanio Delos Santos Avenue (EDSA), Balintawak in Quezon City traversing along Quirino Highway, Novaliches and Zabarte Road in north Caloocan up to Barangay Gaya-gaya in San Jose del Monte, Bulacan. A passenger transfer facility shall be provided proximate to the EDSA-Balintawak station of LRT Line 1 and the MRT 11 Balintawak station.
- Cebu Urban Mass Rapid Transit (UMRT) — The Cebu Urban Mass Rapid Transit is a proposed urban rapid transit system in Metro Cebu. These include the Central Line, a 67.5-kilometer (41.9-mile) underground passenger railway line or subway system that would connect Carcar City in the south to as far as Danao City in the north, and the Coastal Line, starting from Talisay City, Cebu City, Mandaue City, and Lapu-Lapu City.

=== Commuter rail ===
- The PNR Northeast Commuter Line or Cabanatuan–Makati line is a proposed reconstruction of the Balagtas–Cabanatuan branch of the North Main Line. It will branch off the northern half of the North–South Commuter Railway at Balagtas station in Bulacan. Once completed, it will become one of the three major commuter rail corridors in the Greater Capital Region, which consists of the NSCR and the intercity section of the South Main Line. It will connect Nueva Ecija and eastern Bulacan with Makati City in southern Metro Manila. There is also a proposed extension to San Jose, sealing a loop with the NSCR North Phase 4 between Tarlac City in Tarlac and San Jose.
- The Cavite–Laguna Railway is a rail line connecting the two provinces neighboring Metro Manila to the south, Cavite and Laguna.
- The Bataan Railway Project is a proposed project as a parallel to Bataan Expressway that would link businesses and industrial hubs.

=== Intercity rail ===
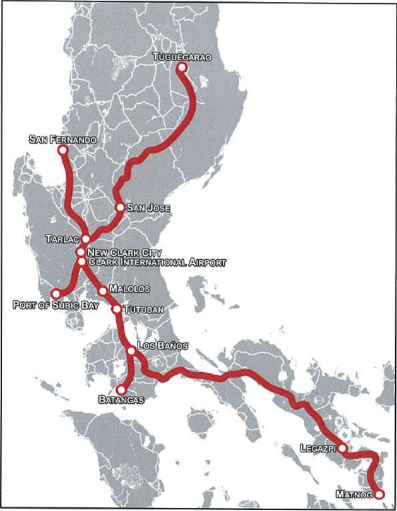
A map of the PNR Luzon System development prior to 2019.

- The PNR South Long Haul project will involve the reconstruction of the old South Main Line and its branch to Batangas City, both as unelectrified standard-gauge lines initially to operate on single-track configuration. The project was supposed to be financed by Chinese official development assistance but was withdrawn in 2023. As of 2025, no progress has been made when the project has not received funding yet when it was placed under preparatory works and has yet to secure all of the relocation of informal settlers.
- Considered to be one of the primary infrastructure projects of the Build! Build! Build! Infrastructure Plan, the Mindanao Railway will consist of about 2,000 kilometers of trackage, with construction of the system divided into phases. The first phase, which is 105 km, is expected to be completed by 2022. The second phase will commence its feasibility study by 2021. The initial railway will connect the cities of Tagum, Davao City and Digos in Davao Region, and the cities of General Santos and Koronadal (Marbel) in Soccsksargen Region with planned phases to connect other major cities in Mindanao, such as Cagayan de Oro, Zamboanga City, Cotabato City and Butuan.
- There are two projects being proposed to reconstruct and extend the PNR North Main Line's intercity section beyond New Clark City in Capas, Tarlac.
  - The North Long Haul Inter–Regional Railway, simply known as the North Long Haul and previously known as the North Long Haul West is the planned long-distance rail system between Manila and northern Luzon. The project is divided into four phases: Phase 1 will be the overhaul of the old PNR North Main Line from Manila to Poro Point Freeport Zone in San Fernando, La Union; Phase 2 will cover the old line's reconstruction to Bacnotan and its extension to Vigan; Phase 3 will be from Vigan to Laoag; and Phase 4 is the Northeast Long Haul line to the Cagayan Valley. The DOTr and the national PPP Center have commissioned Systra and PwC Philippines/Isla Lipana & Co. to undertake studies for the North Long Haul Inter-Regional Railway Project.
  - The Northeast Long Haul line, previously the North Long Haul East is the Phase 4 of the North Long Haul project as well as the latest plan to connect the Cagayan Valley to the rest of Luzon by rail, a project in its planning stages since 1875. If it follows the original 1962 plans, its most notable feature is a 10 km (6.2 mi) railway tunnel, the longest of its kind in the country and would be the highest point in the entire PNR system. There is also a planned extension to Aparri, as well as connecting the two main lines through a series of rail lines passing the Cordillera Administrative Region.
- The Philippine National Railways is interested in constructing a train network in the Visayas, to be known as the Visayas Railway, although no formal proposals have been made. On its vision statement, the PNR aims to become a transnational railroad operator covering all three major island groups in the country including the Visayas. Since 2016, two House Bills were sponsored for the reorganization of the PNR into three government-owned and controlled corporations, one of them being the Visayas Railway Corporation (VRC).
  - The Panay Railways aims to rebuild its network as a loop line around Panay island. Initially a 117 km (73 mi) segment will be built between Iloilo City and Roxas, Capiz. The segment is estimated to cost US$1.5 billion. Planned extensions include a segment to Malay, Aklan and towards Antique before completing the loop in Iloilo City.
  - The Samar–Leyte rail project aims to construct a network in the islands of Samar and Leyte. This proposal was announced during the 4th Philippine Railway Summit on October 26, 2022.

=== Freight rail ===
- The Subic–Clark–Manila–Batangas (SCMB) Railway is a planned freight railway line that would connect Subic, Zambales, Clark, Manila and Batangas. DOTr Secretary Jaime Bautista announced the search for consultants vis-à-vis the feasibility study. The project is part of the Luzon Economic Corridor as it is one of the 28 priority projects. Philippine National Railways Chairman Michael Macapagal told local media in July that the study would be funded using US$6m which the Asian Development Bank allocated in 2023 for the development of rail proposals. He said the US and Japan are also backing the project as part of the Luzon Economic Corridor. A planned 280-kilometer (170-mile) link that would serve Central Luzon, Metro Manila, and Calabarzon. The project was originally conceptualized as the Subic–Clark Railway Project, which would have been a 71-kilometer (44-mile) railway line that was proposed during the administration of former President Rodrigo Duterte, but the Chinese later withdrew the loan for the project in 2023 before it was shelved. On June 27, 2025, a technical aid was established between the Philippines and the United States Trade and Development Agency (USTDA) for the development of the railway. Days later, during the Fourth of July gala, the U.S. announced to fund the freight railway project.
- Manila–Laguna freight revival – The Department of Transportation said it plans to revive the operation of a container cargo rail from Port Area in Manila to Laguna province. The tracks towards the berths of Manila International Container Terminal and Manila North Harbor to Laguna Gateway Inland Container Terminal in Calamba, Laguna will be revived to restart the container cargo service. In July 2016, port operator International Container Terminal Services Inc. and MRail, a subsidiary of Manila Electric Co. (MERALCO), invested P10 billion to revive a freight rail service from Manila to Calamba, Laguna, and in the following year, it was announced that the services would also be extended to Batangas, but the plans never came into fruition.
- North Philippine Dry Port Container Rail Transport Service shall connect freight trains from the Port of Manila to an inland terminal in Balagtas, Bulacan.
- Revival of freight services along PNR South Main Line – On July 15, 2024, PNR announced that it would revive freight services and pursue a P5 billion plan to retrofit the existing line for cargo movement. One of the plans is to operate cargo trains between Calamba, Laguna, and Legazpi in Albay by 2025. In particular, the government looks to build a dry port in Calamba where containers can be carried in and out of the freight trains.

== See also ==
- Department of Transportation
- Public transport in Manila
- Department of Public Works and Highways
- Strong Republic Transit System (SRTS)
- Transportation in the Philippines
- List of rail accidents in the Philippines
- Charles M. Swift, founder of Meralco and Panay Railways

== Sources ==
- "Construction of 2,000 km. Mindanao Railway System to start in 2017". GMA News. August 18, 2016. Archived from the original on March 24, 2017.
