= Joel Marciano Jr. =

Director-general of the Philippine Space Agency

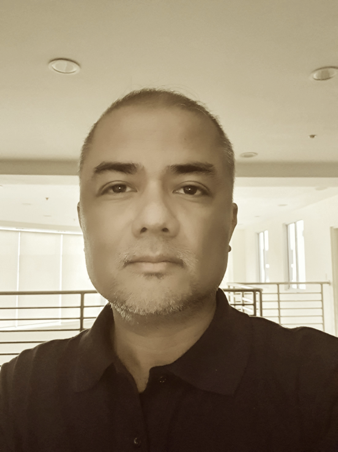

1st Director General of the Philippine Space Agency
- In office January 7, 2020 – September 16, 2025
- President: Rodrigo Duterte; Bongbong Marcos
- Preceded by: Office established
- Succeeded by: Gay Jane Perez (OIC)

Director of the Advanced Science and Technology Institute of the Department of Science and Technology
- In office March 29, 2016 – January 7, 2020
- President: Benigno Aquino III; Rodrigo Duterte
- Preceded by: Denis F. Villorente
- Succeeded by: Joanna G. Syjuco

Personal details
- Born: Joel Joseph Sacro Marciano Jr. 1972 or 1973 (age 53–54) Manila, Philippines
- Education: University of the Philippines Diliman (BSc); University of New South Wales (PhD)
- Occupation: Government official
- Profession: Engineer and academic

Joel Joseph Sacro Marciano Jr. is a Filipino engineer, academic and the first Director General of the Philippine Space Agency, a government agency under the Office of the President in charge of the Philippines' national space program.

Prior to his appointment as PhilSA administrator, Marciano served as acting Director of the Advanced Science and Technology Institute of the Philippine Department of Science and Technology. He is also a university professor at the University of the Philippines College of Engineering since 1994. Marciano has also served as the program head of the Philippine Scientific Earth Observation Microsatellite program (PHL-Microsat) that launched the first Philippine-made satellite, the Diwata-1, into space in April 2016.

== Early life and education ==
Marciano is the second of four siblings born to Joel Jacob Marciano and Elizabeth Sacro. His father was an electronics engineer (Mapua University EE Batch 1968) and entrepreneur from Pinamalayan, Oriental Mindoro who was a former National President of the Institute of Electronics and Communications Engineers of the Philippines and who founded the telecommunications company Telecommunications & Computer Technologies Inc. (TCTI)

He attended Benedictine Abbey School (now San Beda College Alabang) in Muntinlupa, Metro Manila. While there, he developed an interest in public speaking and joined several math competitions. After graduating from high school in 1989, he enrolled in a five-year engineering course at the University of the Philippines Diliman in Quezon City. He considered taking up the study of law, but eventually decided to follow in his father's footsteps with the goal of working for his father's company. He earned his Bachelor of Science degree in Electrical Engineering in 1994.

Immediately following his graduation, Marciano pursued his Master of Science degree in the same university where he was also on the faculty of the UP Diliman Department of Electrical and Electronics Engineering. Two years into his postgraduate studies at UP, he won a government scholarship to the University of New South Wales in Sydney, Australia where he received his Doctor of Philosophy in Electrical Engineering and Telecommunications in 2000.

== Career ==
Marciano started out as an instructor at his alma mater University of the Philippines Diliman in 1994. As a new faculty member of the UP Electrical and Electronics Engineering Institute, he was in charge of setting up the university's space lab, the RF Communications Laboratory (now Wireless Communications Engineering Laboratory) which was completed in 1995. Upon completion of his PhD in Australia, he was hired as an RF/wireless consultant for Integrated Micro-Electronics, Inc. from 2001 to 2008.

Marciano worked as a postdoctoral fellow of the Japan Society for the Promotion of Science at the Tokyo Institute of Technology in 2003. As a fellow of the UP–Dado Banatao Educational Foundation, he worked for the Berkeley Wireless Research Center at the University of California, Berkeley in 2004 and for the School of Electrical and Computer Engineering at the University of California, San Diego in 2005. He continued his work in the United States and served as visiting professor for Tallwood Venture Capital in 2005, and as visiting associate research scientist at UCSD in 2007 and 2009.

Upon his return to the Philippines, Marciano started working for his father's company, TCTI, as its chairman beginning 2008. He also returned to his alma mater and served as Director of the UP Diliman Electrical and Electronics Engineering Institute from 2009 to 2015 and as a full time engineering professor at the university where he held the Dado and Maria Banatao Institute professorial chairmanship until 2016. He also served as a technical consultant for Emerson Network Power and International Telecommunication Union, and co-founded an RFID technology startup company in 2010.

While a professor and director of the UP Diliman engineering department, Marciano also served as Interim Director for the Institute for Information Infrastructure Development of the Philippines–California Advanced Research Institutes (PCARI) under the Philippine Commission on Higher Education from 2013 to 2016. In October 2014, he led a team of Filipino scientists, engineers and researchers to Japan to work on the country's first microsatellites with experts from the Tohoku University and Hokkaido University. The PHL-Microsat program was an initiative of the Department of Science and Technology and the University of the Philippines in partnership with the Japan Aerospace Exploration Agency under the Asian Microsatellite Consortium. With Marciano as its program leader from 2015 to 2018, the country successfully launched its first Philippine-made satellites into orbit, the PHL-Microsat-1 (Diwata-1) in April 2016 and the PHL-Microsat-2 (Diwata-2) in October 2018.

Marciano was appointed as Acting Director of the DOST–Advanced Science and Technology Institute in March 2016. As a DOST executive, he continued his work on the Philippine space program and spearheaded the creation of Philippine Earth Data Resources Observation Centers in Quezon City in December 2016 and in Davao City in June 2019. In June 2018, the institute under his leadership successfully deployed the country's first CubeSat, the Maya-1, in partnership with the Kyushu Institute of Technology.

Marciano also serves as program leader of the STAMINA4Space Program of the DOST-ASTI. In August 2019, he led the inauguration of the country's hub for space technology, the University Laboratory for Small Satellites and Space Engineering Systems building (ULyS3ES) within the UP Diliman campus. Following the passage of the Philippine Space Act (Republic Act No. 11363) in 2019 which created the Philippine Space Agency, Marciano was appointed by President Rodrigo Duterte as the agency's inaugural chief with his appointment paper signed on December 5, 2019.

== Awards ==
Marciano is a recipient of the 2015 David M. Consunji Award for Engineering Research conferred by the Philippine Association for the Advancement of Science and Technology (PhilAAST). Also in 2015, he was awarded the 2015 Engineering Excellence Prize by the Manila Water Foundation for his work on the microsatellite program that significantly improved the country's weather forecasting and climate change monitoring. Marciano was conferred the 2017 UPAA Distinguished Alumnus in the field of Science and Technology by his alma mater, University of the Philippines. He is also honored as among the 100 Outstanding Alumni Engineers of the Century of the University of the Philippines College of Engineering by the UP Alumni Engineers Association. He also received the UP Diliman Gawad Chanselor Para sa Natatanging Guro award, the 50 Men and Women of Science and Technology award from the Department of Science and Technology, and Most Outstanding Electronics Engineer award in the field of Education from the Institute of Electronics Engineers of the Philippines (IECEP).

In December 2019, Marciano and his team won for the Philippines the top prize in the 6th Space Mission Idea Contest held in Tokyo, Japan. His research entitled "Spectrum Monitoring from Space with i-SEEP (SMoSiS) – Capturing and Mapping the Digital Divide from Space through Radio Frequency Spectrum Measurements" was written in collaboration with Calvin Artemies Hilario, Mar de Guzman and Genedyn Mendoza and won first place in the IVA-replaceable Small Exposed Experiment Platform (ISEEP) category.
