= University Laboratory for Small Satellites and Space Engineering Systems =

Filipino space research complex

ULyS^{3}ES
- Established: 2019
- Field of research: Space technology
- Location: Quezon City, Philippines
- Affiliations: Department of Science and Technology
- Operating agency: Advanced Science and Technology Institute

The University Laboratory for Small Satellites and Space Engineering Systems (abbreviated and stylized as ULyS^{3}ES) is a space research complex of two buildings.

== History ==
ULyS^{3}ES was joint project of the University of the Philippines Diliman and the Department of Science and Technology Advanced Science and Technology Institute (DOST-ASTI). The project costing about ₱30 million was funded through DOST Grants-in-Aid in 2016. At that time, the facility was meant to augment the PHL-Microsat program which was later succeeded by the Space Technology and Applications Mastery, Innovation and Advancement (STAMINA4Space) Program as well as to encourage people to take up a career in space technology. It opened on August 31, 2019.

== Facilities ==
ULyS^{3}ES consists of two buildings designated as ULyS^{3}ES-1 and ULyS^{3}ES-2which hosts equipment and facilities that would allow the designing and development of small satellites and the testing and implementation of satellite bus and payload systems. It hosts a full anechoic chamber (FAC) to aid in measuring antenna radiation patterns and hasten the development of satellite communication systems. It also has a separate temperature and humidity test chamber.
