= Institute of Electronics Engineers of the Philippines =

Philippine professional organization

- Abbreviation: IECEP
- Formation: 1950
- Type: Professional
- Legal status: Non-profit
- Headquarters: Mandaluyong, Philippines
- Members: 50,000
- Official language: English
- President: Lory Liza D. Bulay-og
- Website: https://iecepnational.com/

The Institute of Electronics Engineers of the Philippines (IECEP), formerly known as Institute of Electronics and Communications Engineers of the Philippines is a Professional Regulation Commission-recognized organization of Professional Electronics Engineers (PECE), Electronics Engineers (ECE) and Electronics Technicians (ECT) in the Philippines. It is a non-stock and non-profit organization with 50,000 members inside and outside of the country. The IECEP was organized in 1950.

== History ==
The Institute of Electronics and Communications Engineers of the Philippines was founded in 1950 by a group of electronics and communications engineers of the country led by Dean Jose S. Alfonso as its president.

In 1969, President Ferdinand Marcos signed Republic Act No. 5734 known as the Electronics and Communications Engineering Law to mandate the practice and responsibilities of the electronics and communications engineer.

In 2004, President Gloria Macapagal-Arroyo signed Republic Act No. 9292 known as Electronics Engineering Law to expand the responsibilities to the professional electronics engineer (PECE), the electronics engineer (ECE), and the electronics technician (ECT). The Institute of Electronics and Communications Engineers of the Philippines was renamed into the Institute of Electronics Engineers of the Philippines, Inc.

== Chapters ==
List of accredited chapters of IECEP as of 2024.

Local

- IECEP Bataan Chapter
- IECEP Batangas Chapter
- IECEP Bicol Chapter
- IECEP Bohol Chapter
- IECEP Bulacan Chapter
- IECEP Cagayan Valley Chapter
- IECEP Caraga Chapter
- IECEP Cavite Chapter
- IECEP Cebu Chapter
- IECEP Cordillera Administrative Region Chapter
- IECEP Davao Chapter
- IECEP Eastern Visayas Chapter
- IECEP Iligan Bay Chapter
- IECEP Ilocos Norte Chapter
- IECEP Iloilo-Western Visayas Chapter
- IECEP Laguna Chapter
- IECEP Lupang (La Union-Pangasinan) Chapter
- IECEP Manila Chapter
- IECEP Marinduque Chapter
- IECEP Mindoro Chapter
- IECEP Misamis Occidental Chapter
- IECEP Negros Occidental Chapter
- IECEP Negros Oriental Chapter
- IECEP North Mindanao Chapter
- IECEP Northeast (Quezon City) Chapter
- IECEP Nueva Ecija Chapter
- IECEP Palawan Chapter
- IECEP Pampanga Chapter
- IECEP Pagadian Chapter
- IECEP Quezon Province Chapter
- IECEP Rizal Chapter
- IECEP SOCCSKSARGEN Chapter
- IECEP Tarlac Chapter
- IECEP Zambales Chapter
- IECEP Zamboanga Chapter
- IECEP Zamboanga del Norte Chapter

International

- IECEP Americas Chapter
- IECEP Bahrain Chapter
- IECEP Europe Chapter
- IECEP Japan Chapter
- IECEP KSA Central Region Chapr
- IECEP KSA Eastern Region Chapter
- IECEP KSA Western Region Chapter
- IECEP Kuwait Chapter
- IECEP Oman Chapter
- IECEP Qatar Chapter
- IECEP Singapore Chapter
- IECEP UAE Chapter

== Notable members ==
- Joel Marciano Jr. – director-general of Philippine Space Agency, and acting director of Advanced Science and Technology Institute.

== See also ==
- Institute of Computer Engineers of the Philippines
- Electronics engineering
