= UP Diliman Automated Guideway Transit System =

Coordinates: 14°39′11.03″N 121°3′34.92″E

University of the Philippines Diliman Automated Guideway Transit System
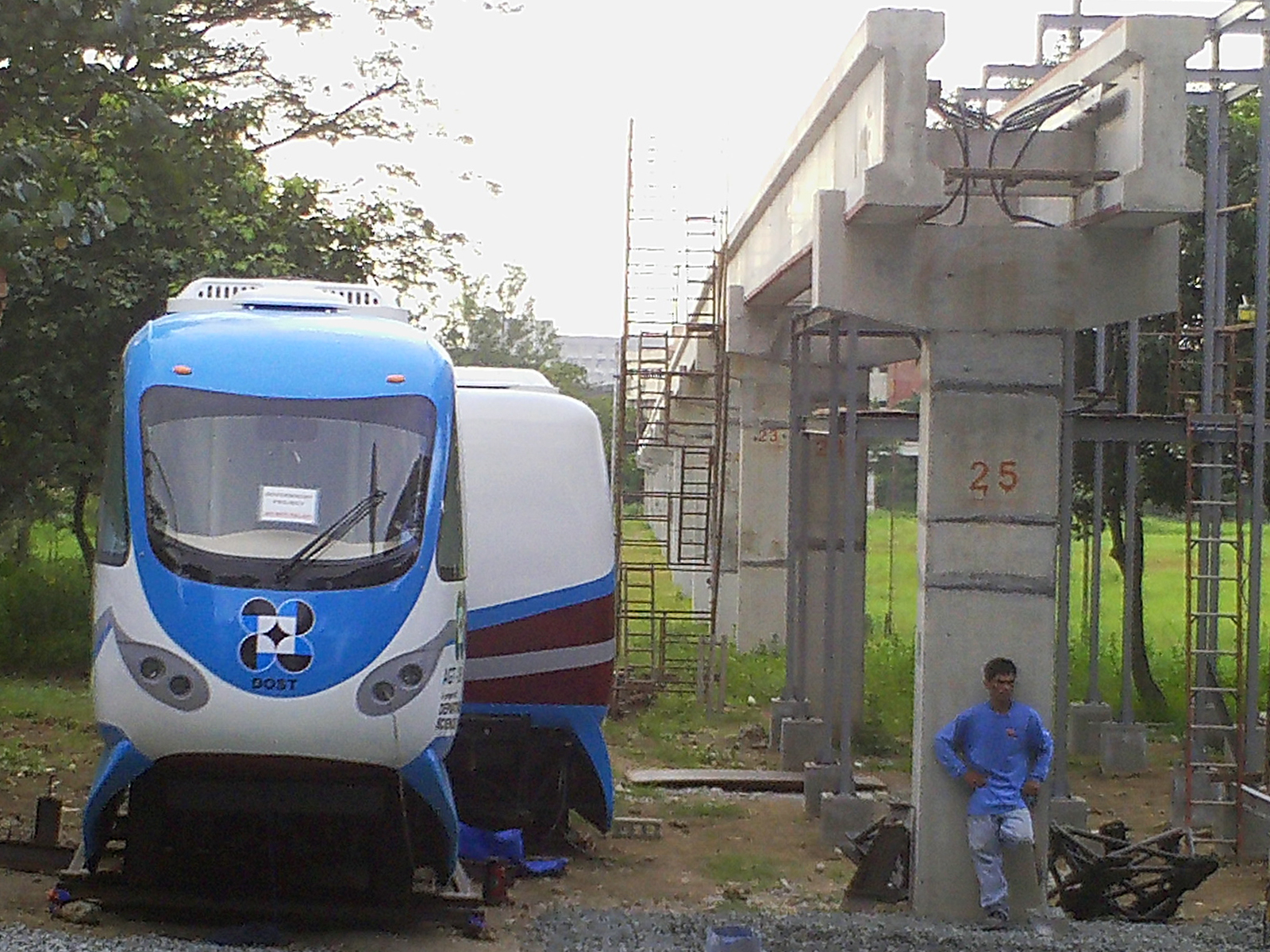
- UP Diliman AGT System

Overview
- Status: Dismantled
- Locale: University of the Philippines, Quezon City, Metro Manila, Philippines
- Stations: 2

Service
- Type: Automated Guideway Transit (AGT) / Technology demonstration

Technical
- Track length: 465 meters (1,526 ft)
- Number of tracks: 1
- Operating speed: 50–60 kilometers per hour (31–37 mph) (planned)
- Highest elevation: 5 meters (16 ft)

The University of the Philippines Diliman AGT was an automated guideway transit (AGT) system constructed for technology demonstration within the campus of the University of the Philippines (UP) in Diliman, Quezon City in the Philippines. It served as a test track for the first mass transit system to be built and developed in the country by local engineers.

The first phase of the project was funded by the Department of Science and Technology (DOST) in a joint project with the UP administration. DOST provided funding and supervised the first phase as well as the design of the coaches and track to be used. If found feasible, the project would be expanded into a 6.9-kilometre (4.3 mi) intracampus loop. In October 2018, the DOST announced that it would dismantle the railway line and transfer it to another university after UP declined use of the facility.

== History ==
In his speech during his 2011 State of the Nation, President Benigno Aquino III called for the development of the AGT elevated train system as a potential solution to the problem of mass transportation in country. The project could result in more kilometers of cheap transport, decongesting urban centers and allowing rural communities easier access to centers of commerce and industry. Based on international studies, the AGT system is the most cost-effective and less intrusive mass transport for commuting countries like the Philippines according to DOST. AGT systems are designed to be cheaper and lighter than the rapid transit system serving the commuters of Metro Manila. The system would be developed and built locally utilizing local engineers and resources to minimize cost.

Plans for the rapid transit system were revealed as early as December 2010. The electric, driverless, fully automated guideway transit system would be grade-separated, running on rubber tires. DOST assured that it will not harm the environment and no trees will be cut in the campus. The train will have two passenger coaches with a capacity of 60 persons per coach.

The construction of the railway was started in June after the contract was awarded to construction and engineering firm Miescor Builders Inc. The groundbreaking ceremony was held on July 18, 2011, at the corner of Jacinto St. and Lakandula St. The railway line became operational in 2012, with trains with two coaches arriving at the campus on November 25, 2012, with the initial test run scheduled in December 2012. The initial test track is 465-metre (1,526 ft) long with an elevation of 5-metre (16 ft), between C.P. Garcia Avenue, across from the Commission on Higher Education building, and Jacinto Street running along the College of Fine Arts.

Both the DOST and the university conducted test runs to check economic viability, power consumption and strength of materials. The test track was used to fine-tune the technology's mechanisms and operation, which include speed, stability, brake distance, and power, among others. DOST previously created an earlier prototype, launched in Bicutan, Taguig City on a straight 150-metre (490 ft) track. The UPD campus is a chance to test the system on a curved and circular track.

Aquino and various government officials rode the test line in April 2013; the ride was described as "bumpy" because of uneven tracks and the suspension system. Officials from the DOST said that in the next generation of vehicles these problems would be rectified.

The pilot AGT project served as a test case for future cheaper and safer alternative for mass transit projects in the country.

In October 2018, the DOST announced that it would dismantle the AGTS line within the University of the Philippines after the university declined use of the railway. The dismantling works is projected to be finished by the end of 2018 and the DOST plans to set up a similar line in another university. The government agency is negotiating with the Bataan Peninsula State University to regarding the transfer the AGTS from UP to its campus.

== Cost ==
The budget of the Department of Science and Technology for the elevated track and the AGT train was initially placed at PHP 16 million and PHP 4 million, respectively. The amount of the contract awarded to Miescor is PHP 22 million. The trains cost less as they are locally made using local materials, not imported. The DOST had a budget of at least ₱13 million for the dismantlement of the railway line.

== Planned expansion ==
The rail line was planned to be expanded into a 6.9-kilometre (4.3 mi) track that will loop the campus. The route will include stops not covered by jeepneys. A total of thirteen stations are included in the proposed plan. The speed of the train in the campus is planned at 50 to 60 kilometers per hour (31 to 37 mph) similar to Line 3 trains, but an upgrade to 120 kilometers per hour (75 mph) is under study.

UP Diliman AGTS proposed stations
Name
Philcoa
CP Garcia
Lakandula–Academic Oval West
Delos Reyes–Dormitory
CP Garcia-College of Engineering
Science Complex
Katipunan
Vinzons Hall–Academic
Oval East
International Center
Laurel–Shopping Center
Balagtas–Commonwealth
CHK-SURP-Solair
UP-Ayala Technohub

== See also ==
- Automated Guideway Transit System project (Philippines)
- Bicutan Automated Guideway Transit System
