= Safe, Swift and Smart Passage =

Online travel management system

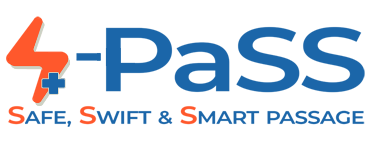
- Available in: English
- Headquarters: I
- Country of origin: Philippines
- Area served: Philippines
- Owner: Department of Science and Technology (DOST)
- Creator: DOST Region VI
- Services: Local COVID-19 travel restriction information, local travel permit processing
- Website: s-pass.ph
- Commercial: No
- Registration: Yes (for travel permit processing)
- Users: 3 million (October 2021)
- Launched: March 26, 2021; 5 years ago
- Current status: Online

Safe, Swift and Smart Passage (S-PaSS) is an online travel management system of the Department of Science and Technology used for domestic travel during the COVID-19 pandemic in the Philippines when varying levels of travel restrictions was imposed in local government units. It is used as a platform for individuals to check on prevailing travel policies and requirements in a specific LGU as well as secure travel coordination permits (TCP) and travel pass-through permits (TPP) from local governments.

Described as a "one-stop online communication and coordination platform for travelers and local government units", S-PaSS was launched on March 26, 2021. It was developed by the DOST's Region VI (Western Visayas) office.

As of October 1, 2021, the S-PaSS have at least 3 million registered users.
