= Automated Guideway Transit System project (Philippines) =

Philippine transit project

Automated Guideway Transit System (AGTS) project
- Type of project: Rail technology development
- Products: Design for an automated guideway transit
- Location: Metro Manila
- Owner: Department of Science and Technology
- Country: Philippines
- Status: Undergoing tests

The Philippine government has commenced a project to develop a locally designed and manufactured Automated Guideway Transit System (AGTS) through its Department of Science and Technology (DOST). Two prototype lines has been set up by the DOST, one within the University of the Philippines Diliman campus and another in Bicutan in Taguig.

== Background ==
The Philippine government through the Department of Science and Technology (DOST) has made efforts to develop a locally designed Automated Guideway Transit System (AGTS) to curb heavy traffic and air pollution in Metro Manila. The DOST's AGTS was conceptualized to be similar to that of a monorail system but at one-fifth of its cost. AGTS lines are intended to be set up in Metro Manila to augment or serve as a "feeder" to the existing Manila Metro Rail Transit System. A prototype system was developed by the DOST with the University of the Philippines Diliman as a means to demonstrate AGT technology as an efficient mode of transport for the country.

The project is part of the DOST's broader High-Impact Technology Solutions (HITS) project. The leading implementing agency is the Metals Industry Research and Development Center (MIRDC) Other child agencies of the DOST involved are the Philippine Council for Industry, Energy and Emerging Technology Research and Development (PCIEERD) which funded the project under the Makina at Teknolohiya para sa Bayan (MakiBayan) Program of the MIRDC, and Project Management and Engineering Design Services Office (PMEDSO).

The UP National Center for Transportation Studies, College of Engineering, and the National Institute of Geological Sciences are also involved in the project as consultants to the DOST.

The project's lead implementing agency in DOST— the Metals Industry Research and Development Center (MIRDC)—constructed the train's main mechanical frameworks or “rolling stocks”, and subcontracted local companies and Fil-Asia Automotive to construct the guideway and the coaches, respectively, based on the design team's specifications.

== History ==
A 465 meters (1,526 ft) prototype elevated line, which ran from CP Garcia Street to Jacinto Street near the College of Fine Arts was first established within the University of the Philippines Diliman campus in Quezon City. The first test run for the AGTS was made at this line on December 14, 2012.

== Rolling stock ==
AGT 30 / AGT 120
- Manufacturers: Metals Industry Research and Development Center, Fil-Asia Automotive
- Designers: Metals Industry Research and Development Center
- Constructed: 2011
- Entered service: N/A (For technology demonstration)
- Capacity: AGT 30; 30; AGT 120; 120
- Line served: 2

Specifications
- Maximum speed: AGT 30; 45 km/h (28 mph)

The Metals Industry Research and Development Center constructed the rolling stocks or main mechanical frameworks used for the DOST's AGTS. Construction of the coaches were also subcontracted to Fil-Asia Automotive.

At least two rolling stock prototypes has been developed as part of the AGTS project of the DOST, the AGT 30 and the AGT 120. The former was used in the University of the Philippines line while the latter was used in the Bicutan line.

The AGT 30, can carry 30 passenger per coach and has two passenger sections with safety features. It also has a communication and automated fare collection system. The prototype has two coaches with full airconditioning and has a suspension system, solid tires for guide wheels and extra wide automatic sliding doors. The full load top speed of each coach is 30 to 45 kilometers per hour (19 to 28 mph). The AGT 120 has a larger capacity, with its capacity of 120 passenger per coach. The target maximum speed of each coach is 60 kilometers per hour (37 mph).

== Track design and compatibility ==
DOST's AGTS was initially conceptualized as a monorail in 2011 but modifications made to the prototype has revised the project. The current design of the AGTS makes use of a railroad track with two rails instead of only one rail used in monorails. Miescor Builders, a subcontractor of the MIRDC, was responsible for the guideway.

== Prototype lines ==
- AGT-UP
- AGT-Bicutan
