= Starbooks =

Interactive kiosk system

- Also known as: Science and Technology Academic and Research-Based Openly Operated Kiosks
- Manufacturer: Science and Technology Information Institute
- Type: Interactive kiosk
- Released: 2011
- Introductory price: Cost dependent on desktop unit, Pod component at ₱10,000
- Units shipped: 5,127 pods (2021)
- Website: portal.starbooks.ph

Starbooks (short for Science and Technology Academic and Research-Based Openly Operated KioskS) is an interactive kiosk system developed by the Science and Technology Information Institute (STII) of the Department of Science and Technology (DOST) of the Philippine government.

== History ==
Starbooks was conceptualized by Department of Science and Technology (DOST) Assistant Secretary and Science and Technology Information Institute (STII; an organization under the DOST) Officer in Charge Raymund Liboro. Liboro developed the interactive kiosk project as a response to few people patronizing libraries. It was first launched at the STII lobby on June 24, 2011, with the DOST Regional Office IX in the Zamboanga Peninsula being among the first adopters of the technology.

Starbooks was featured at the 2011 Regional Invention Contests and Exhibits in Davao City in Davao City. In 2012, the first mass deployment of Starbooks took place in select schools in Leyte. By 2014, all regions in the Philippines had their own Starbooks. In 2016, the 1,000th site was installed in Calauan, Laguna and the kiosk system was upgraded with the introduction of "Super Starbooks".

In 2020, amidst the COVID-19 pandemic which affected the country's education system, mobile apps were released Starbooks Whiz, a gamified quiz program and the Starbooks Online App.

== Features ==
Starbooks (software)
- Original authors: Science and Technology Information Institute (STII)
- Initial release: 2011; 15 years ago
- Operating system: Windows 7 and later
- Type: Education

Described as a "digital library in a box", the Starbooks interactive kiosk hosts media including text, audio, and videos related to science, technology, engineering and mathematics (STEM). A Starbooks kiosk consist of a desktop installed on a specially designed "pod" structure. The system is a standalone information kiosk which does not rely on internet access. Media hosted can be printed but are not downloadable.
