= Institute of Computer Engineers of the Philippines =

- Abbreviation: ICpEP
- Formation: 1992
- Type: Professional association
- Registration no.: SEC Reg. No. 201120675
- Legal status: Non-profit
- Location: Philippines
- Official language: English
- Website: www.icpep.org.ph
- Formerly called: Philippine Institute of Computer Engineers

The Institute of Computer Engineers of the Philippines (ICpEP, formerly Philippine Institute of Computer Engineers) is a non-profit professional organization of computer engineers in the Philippines. It is registered under the Securities and Exchange Commission as a non-stock and non-profit organization. ICpEP is also the official computer engineering organization for academic community and industry practitioners in the Philippines.

== History ==
In 1992, a group of computer engineers formed a professional organization for computer engineers, the Philippine Institute of Computer Engineers, or PhICEs. But after years of being active and conducting conventions, seminars, and symposia to fellow computer engineers and students, PhICEs became inactive.

In 2008, several computer engineers tried to revive the professional organization after it's been inactive for years. Then the organization was reformed as Institute of Computer Engineers of the Philippines.

=== History of ICpEP.SE ===
ICpEP.SE or Institute of Computer Engineers of the Philippines Student Edition, is a student chapter of the ICpEP, which aims to link academics to various colleges and universities. The first group of student chapters started in 2008, it was founded by 11 schools, namely, Adamson University, Asia Pacific College, Central Colleges of the Philippines, De La Salle University, Far Eastern University Institute of Technology, Mapua Institute of Technology, Pamantasan ng Lungsod ng Maynila, Polytechnic University of the Philippines-Manila, STI College-Recto, Technological Institute of the Philippines-Manila, and Technological Institute of the Philippines-Quezon City. And now, there are more than sixty-eight schools across the Philippines that have an ICpEP student chapter.

== See also ==
- Institute of Electronics Engineers of the Philippines
- Computer engineering
