= Health Research Development Information Network =

Health Research Development Information Network PLUS (HERDIN PLUS)
Lead Agency:	Philippine Council for Health Research and Development (DOST-PCHRD)
Official Website:	www.herdin.ph

The Health Research and Development Information Network PLUS (HERDIN PLUS) is a research information management system and collaboration platform for Higher Education and Research and Development Institutions to collect, organize, and disseminate research information at the institutional level, making it easier to generate reports for the Commission on Higher Education (CHED), the Department of Science and Technology (DOST), the Department of Health (DOH) and other bodies. It can be accessed at http://herdin.ph.

HERDIN PLUS is the new branding of the Philippine Health Research Registry and a one stop (health) research information management platform in the Philippines.

== History ==
It started during the 1980s as a project of the Philippine Council for Health Research and Development (PCHRD) supported by the International Development Research Centre (IDRC) of Canada, United Nations Educational, Scientific and Cultural Organization (UNESCO), and the British Council with the Department of Health and University of the Philippines Manila as major cooperators.

- 1987 - Establish systems, procedures, & databases
- 1991 - HERDIN Online (Bulletin board system, Dial-up)
- 1994 - HERDIN Online (Internet)
- 1997 - HERDIN CD version 1
- 1998 - Introduction and use of eHealth ph communities
- 2002 - Open source systems
- 2003 - ISIS Online (open isis), Annual CD version release
- 2005 - Ganesha Digital Library
- 2007 - Network-of-Networks (NeoN)
- 2012 - The Philippine Health Research Registry was launched with DOH-FDA for registering clinical trials as well as newly-approved and ongoing health researches.
- 2015 - The PNHRS (PNHRS) Monitoring and Evaluation module was developed for online data collection and report generation.
- 2017 - The Project Management System () was developed as a tool for online submission, review and approval of proposals and monitoring of approved projects.
- 2019 - The four systems were integrated into one, called HERDIN PLUS.
- 2022 - Nationwide roll-out
