= Bicutan Automated Guideway Transit System =

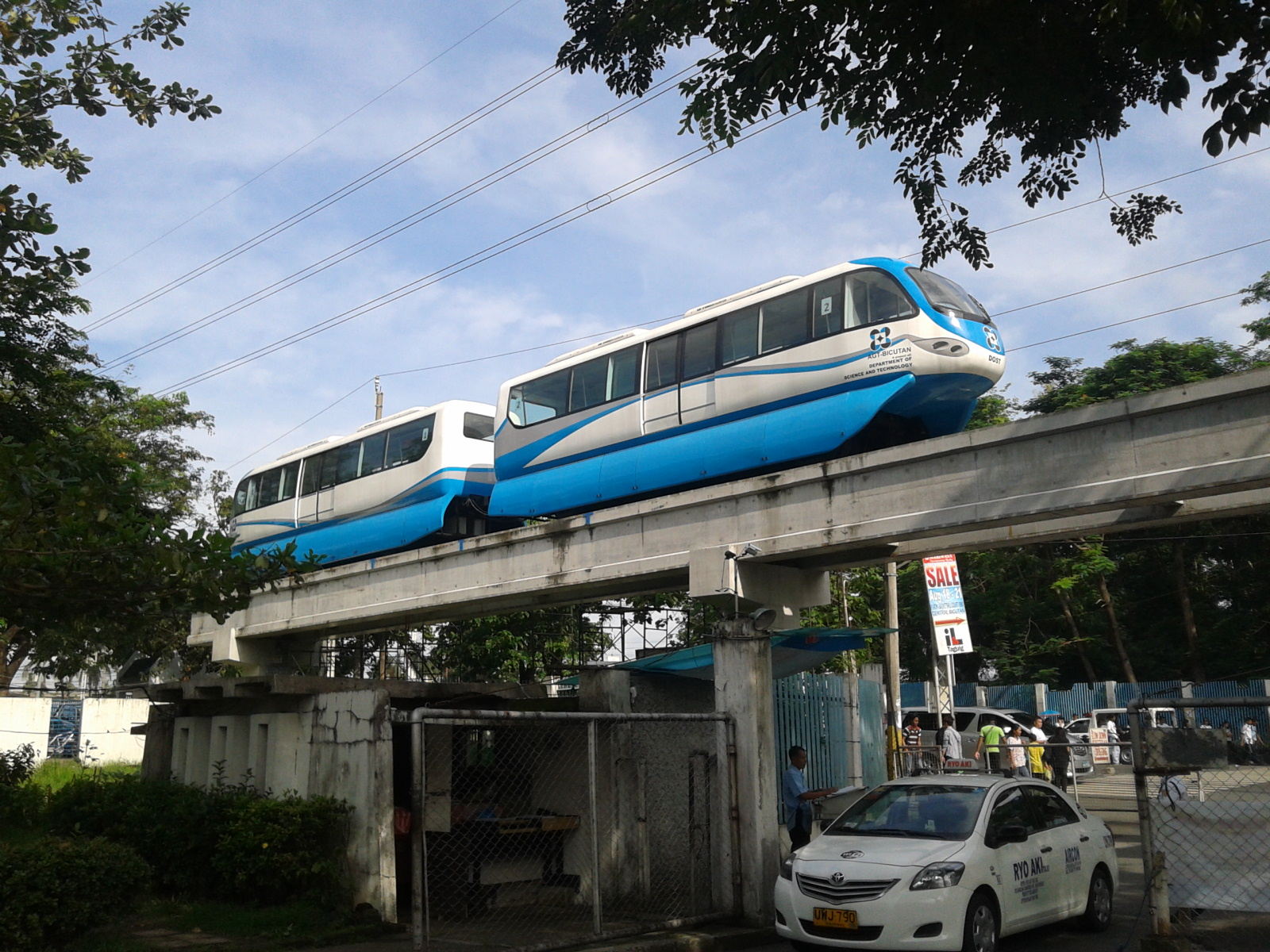
- Bicutan AGT System

Overview
- Status: Discontinued
- Locale: Taguig, Metro Manila, Philippines

Service
- Type: Automated Guideway Transit (AGT)
- Services: Taguig C-6 (planned)

Technical
- Track length: 372 m (1,220 ft) (test track); 6.9 km (4.3 mi) (planned)
- Number of tracks: 1
- Operating speed: 50–60 km/h (31–37 mph) (planned)
- Highest elevation: 10 m (33 ft)

The Bicutan AGT is an automated guideway transit (AGT) system under development as of 2024 within the City of Taguig in the Philippines. It will serve as test track for the second mass transit system to be built and developed in the country by local engineers.

Despite some media reports calling it a monorail, the system uses two parallel concrete beams to form a track.

The Department of Science and Technology (Philippines) , and Bataan Peninsula State University signed a Memorandum of Agreement for the installation of the AGT at the BPSU Main Campus.

== Background ==
The project was initiated in 2011 as part of DOST's broader High-Impact Technology Solutions (HITS) program to address chronic traffic congestion and air pollution. The goal was to develop a cost-effective, domestic rail technology designed and manufactured entirely by Filipino engineers at approximately one-fifth the cost of imported foreign systems. The system was conceptualized to function as a drive less, electric-powered feeder network to augment existing commuter rail lines.

== See also ==
- Automated Guideway Transit System project (Philippines)
