= Advanced Science and Technology Institute (Philippines) =

Research and development organization in the Philippines

- Surian ng Sulóng na Agham at Teknolohiya
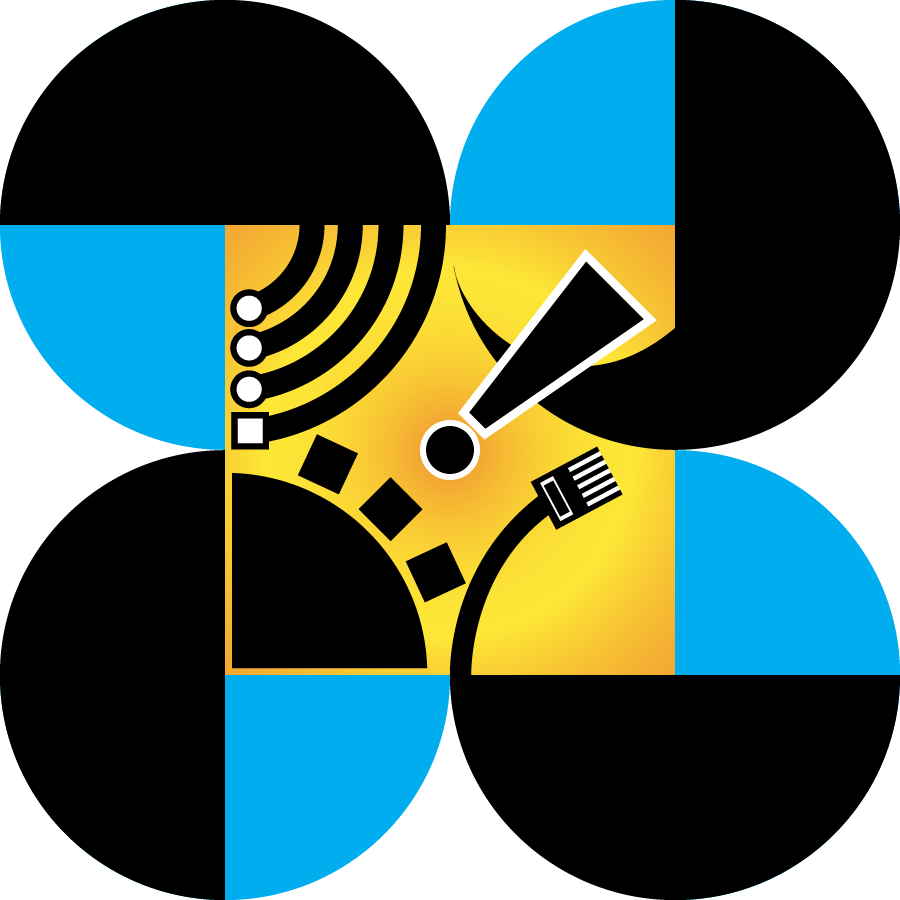

Research institute overview
- Formed: January 30, 1987
- Headquarters: U.P. Technology Park Complex, Quezon City, Metro Manila, Philippines; 14°38′50″N 121°04′18″E
- Employees: 75 (2024)
- Annual budget: ₱508.06 million (2021)
- Research institute executive: Dr. Franz Asunta de Leon, Director
- Parent department: Department of Science and Technology
- Key document: Executive Order No. 128
- Website: asti.dost.gov.ph

The Advanced Science and Technology Institute (ASTI; Filipino: Surian ng Sulóng na Agham at Teknolohiya) is a research and development organization based in the Quezon City, Philippines. It is one of the research and development institutes of the Department of Science and Technology of the Philippine government.

== Background ==
Advances in information and communications technology and microelectronics led to the establishment of the Advanced Science and Technology Institute (ASTI) in the 1980s. The National Science and Technology Authority (NSTA) was renamed and reorganized as the Department of Science and Technology (DOST) in 1987 by then President Corazon Aquino. The ASTI itself was established on January 30, 1987, through Executive Order No. 128 issued by Aquino. The institute became one of the government's agency which focuses on the field of research and development, information and communications technology and microelectronics.

== See also ==
- Philippine Scientific Earth Observation Microsatellite program
