= Department of Science and Technology (Philippines) =

Executive department of the Philippine government

- Kagawaran ng Agham at Teknolohiya

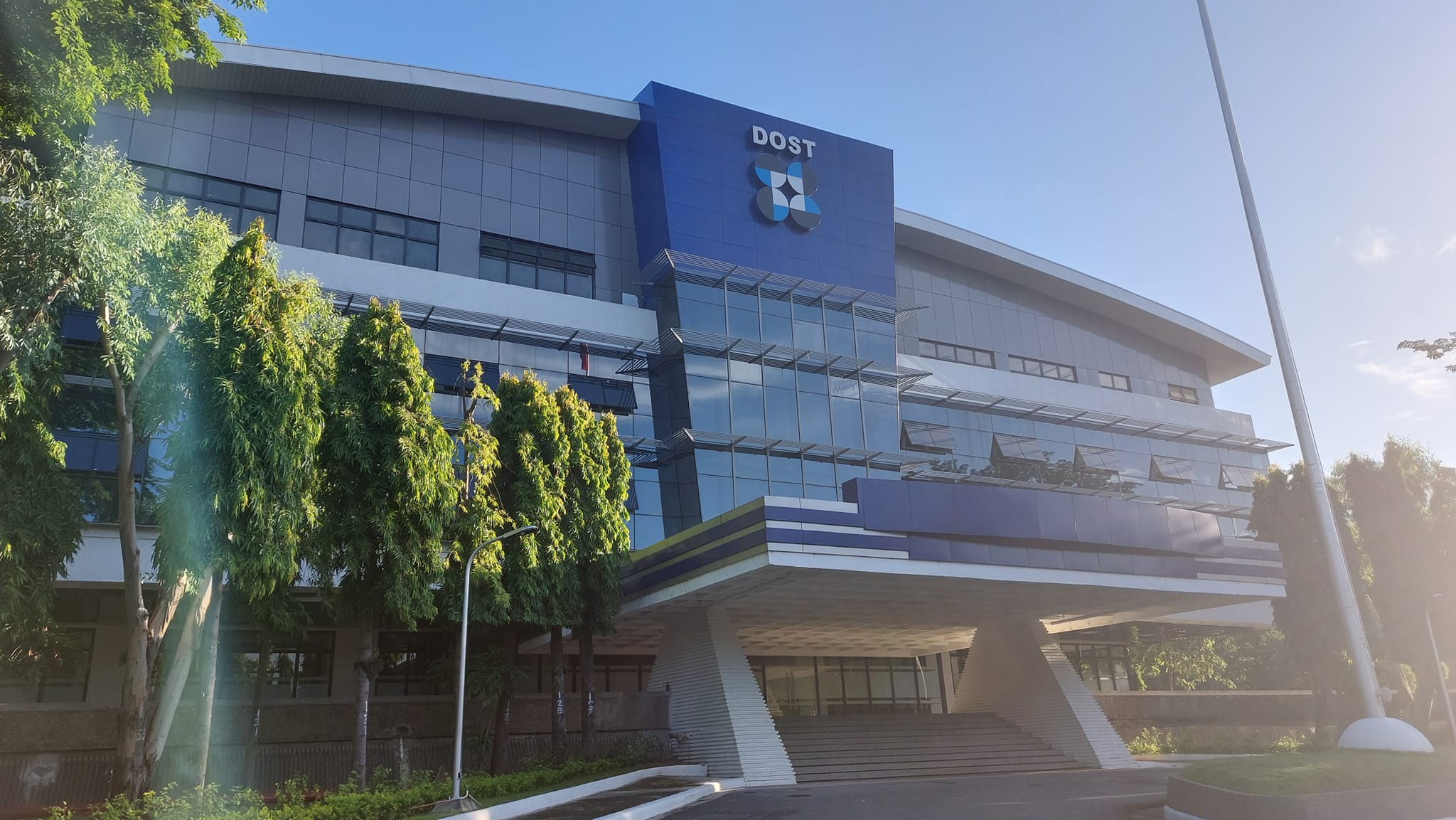
- The DOST headquarters building in Taguig

Department overview
- Formed: June 13, 1958; 68 years ago
- Headquarters: DOST Compound, General Santos Avenue, Central Bicutan, Taguig, Metro Manila, Philippines
- Employees: 739 (2024)
- Annual budget: ₱24.92 billion (2021)
- Department executive: Renato Solidum Jr., Secretary
- Child Department: See below
- Website: www.dost.gov.ph

The Department of Science and Technology (DOST; Filipino: Kagawaran ng Agham at Teknolohiya) is the executive department of the Philippine government responsible for coordinating science and technology-related projects and for formulating policies and programs in these fields to support national development.

== History ==
The DOST was formed as the National Science Development Board by Republic Act No. 2067 on June 13, 1958, during the administration of President Carlos P. Garcia. The science body was formed as a result of a law passed in the Congress upon the recommendation of Dr. Frank Co Tui, who was tasked by Garcia to conduct a survey regarding the state of science and technology in the country. In 1962, Nacionalista Rep. Joaquin R. Roces of Manila's 2nd district proposed amending RA 2067 in order to remove the chairman's cabinet-level ranking. The NSDB was later reorganized as the National Science and Technology Authority (NSTA) on March 17, 1981, and was given broader policy-making and program implementing functions.

On January 30, 1987, during the administration of President Corazon Aquino, the NSTA was elevated to cabinet-level status with the signing of Executive Order No. 128, and was renamed as the Department of Science and Technology.

== Functions ==
1. Formulate and adopt a comprehensive National Science and Technology Plan, and monitor and coordinate its funding and implementation;
2. Promote, assist and, where appropriate, undertake scientific and technological research and development in areas identified as vital to the country's development;
3. Promote the development of indigenous technology and the adaptation and innovation of suitable imported technology, and in this regard, undertake technology development up to commercial stage;
4. Undertake design and engineering works to complement research and development functions;
5. Promote, assist and, where appropriate, undertake the transfer of the results of scientific and technological research and development to their end-users;
6. Promote, assist and, where appropriate, undertake the technological services needed by agriculture, industry, transport, and the general public;
7. Develop and maintain an information system and databank on science and technology;
8. Develop and implement programs for strengthening scientific and technological capabilities through manpower training, infrastructure and institution-building;
9. Promote public consciousness in science and technology; and
10. Undertake policy research, technology assessment, feasibility and technical studies.

== Organizational structure ==
The department is headed by the Secretary of Science and Technology (Philippines), with the following four undersecretaries and three assistant secretaries:

- Undersecretary for Scientific and Technical Services
- Undersecretary for Research and Development
- Undersecretary for Regional Operations
- Undersecretary for Special Concerns
- Assistant Secretary for Administrative and Legal Affairs
- Assistant Secretary for Technology Transfer, Communications, and Commercialization
- Assistant Secretary for Development Cooperation

== Offices ==
=== Collegial and scientific bodies ===
- National Academy of Science and Technology (NAST)
- National Research Council of the Philippines (NRCP)

=== Sectoral planning councils ===
- Philippine Council for Agriculture, Aquatic, and Natural Resources Research and Development (PCAARRD)
- Philippine Council for Health Research and Development (PCHRD)
- Philippine Council for Industry, Energy and Emerging Technology Research and Development (PCIEERD)

=== Research and development institutes ===
- Advanced Science and Technology Institute (ASTI)
- Food and Nutrition Research Institute (FNRI)
- Forest Products Research Development Institute (FPRDI)
- Industrial Technology Development Institute (ITDI)
- Metal Industry Research and Development Center (MIRDC)
- Philippine Nuclear Research Institute (PNRI)
- Philippine Textile Research Institute (PTRI)
- Virology and Vaccine Institute of the Philippines (VIP)

=== Scientific and technological services ===
- Philippine Atmospheric, Geophysical and Astronomical Services Administration (PAGASA)
- Philippine Institute of Volcanology and Seismology (PHIVOLCS)
- Philippine Science High School System (PSHS)
- Science and Technology Information Institute (STII)
- Science Education Institute (SEI)
- Technology Application and Promotion Institute (TAPI)
- Technology Resource Center (TRC)

== Projects ==
- Automated Guideway Transit System project
- DOST Hybrid Electric Road Train
- DOST Hybrid Electric Train
- Health Research Development Information Network
- Vertical Helophyte Filter System (VHFS)
- Starbooks

== See also ==
- DOSTv: Science for the People
- Philippine Space Agency
- Science for Change
- Vertical Helophyte Filter System (VHFS)
