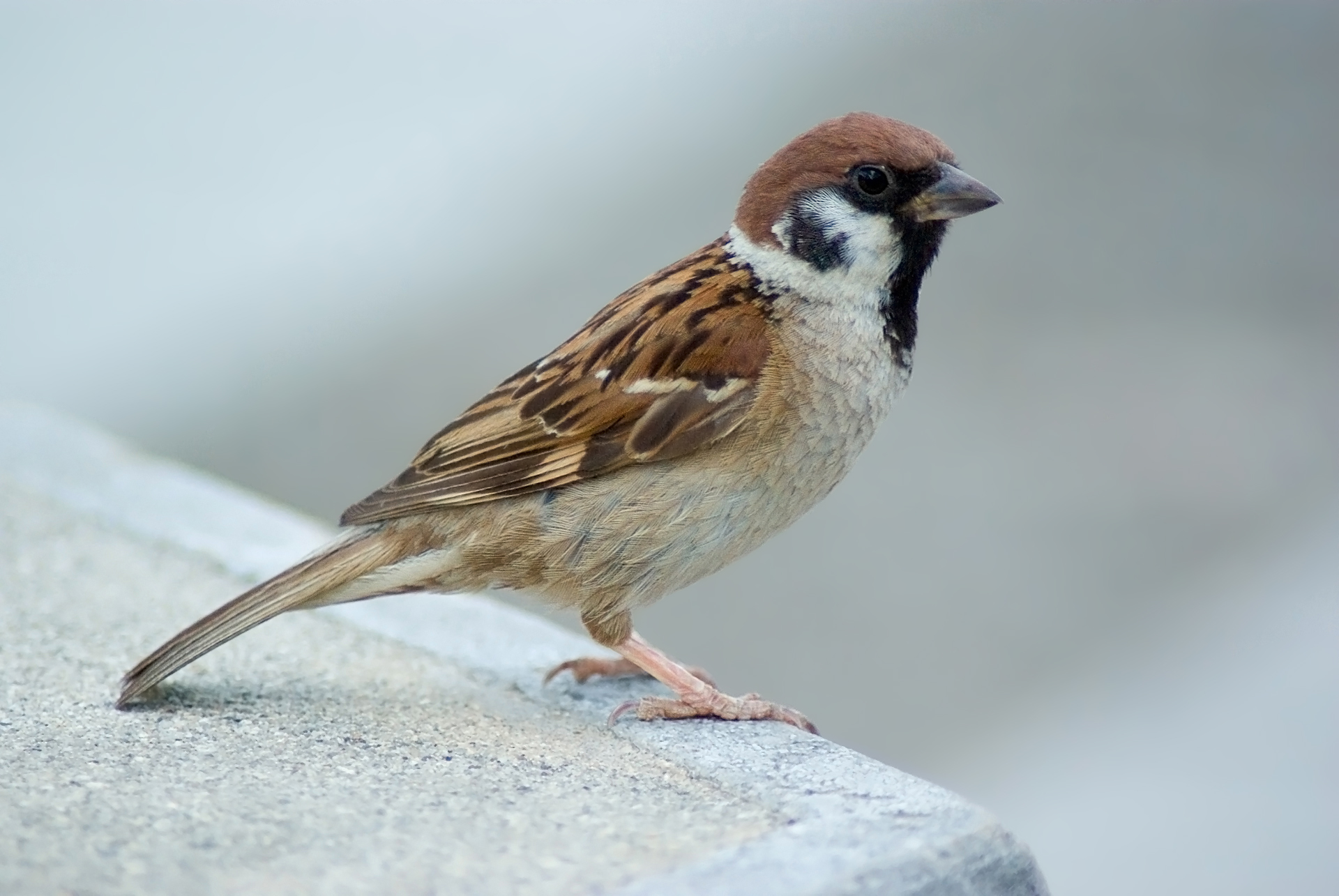
- Adult of subspecies P. m. saturatus in Osaka, Japan
- Flock calling, in Moscow, Russia

Conservation status
- Least Concern (IUCN 3.1)

Scientific classification
- Kingdom: Animalia
- Phylum: Chordata
- Class: Aves
- Order: Passeriformes
- Family: Passeridae
- Genus: Passer
- Species: P. montanus

Binomial name
- Passer montanus (Linnaeus, 1758)
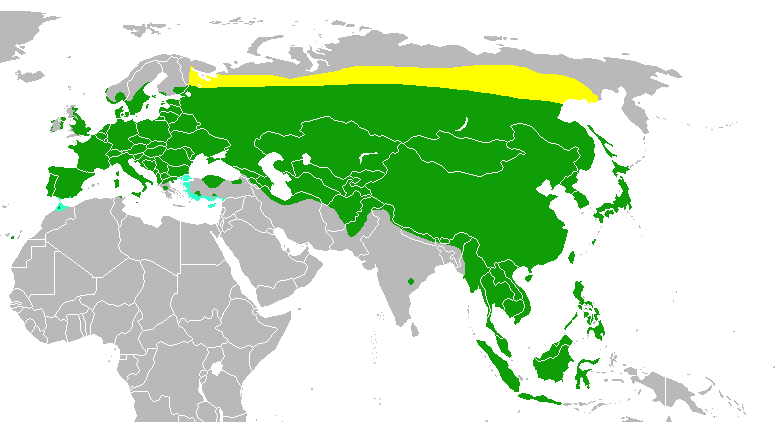
- Afro-Eurasian distribution Breeding summer visitor Resident breeder Non-breeding winter visitor

Synonyms
- Fringilla montana Linnaeus, 1758; Loxia scandens Hermann 1783; Passer arboreus Foster 1817

= Eurasian tree sparrow =

Species of bird

The tree sparrow (Passer montanus Latin pronunciation: [pas.ser mon.ta.nus]) is a passerine bird in the sparrow family with a rich chestnut crown and nape and a black patch on each pure white cheek. The sexes have similar plumage, and young birds are duller versions of the adult. This sparrow breeds across much of temperate Eurasia and Southeast Asia and has been introduced elsewhere, including the United States, where it is known as the Eurasian tree sparrow or German sparrow to differentiate it from the native American tree sparrow. Although several subspecies are recognised, the appearance of this bird varies little across its extensive range.

The untidy nest of the tree sparrow is built in a natural cavity, a hole in a building, or the disused nest of a European magpie or white stork. The typical clutch is five or six eggs, which hatch in under two weeks. This sparrow mainly feeds on seeds, but also consumes invertebrates, particularly during the breeding season. As with other small birds, infection by parasites and diseases, as well as predation by birds of prey, take their toll, and the typical lifespan is about two years.

The tree sparrow is widespread in the towns and cities of eastern Asia, but in Europe, it inhabits lightly wooded open countryside, while the house sparrow breeds in more urban areas. The tree sparrow's extensive range and large population mean it is not globally endangered, although there have been significant population declines in Western Europe, partly due to changes in farming practices involving increased use of herbicides and the loss of winter stubble fields. In eastern Asia and western Australia, this species is sometimes considered a pest, though it is also widely celebrated in oriental art.

== Description ==
The tree sparrow is 12.5–14 cm (5–5 1/2 in) long, with a wingspan of about 21 cm (8.3 in) and a weight of 24 g (0.85 oz), making it roughly 10% smaller than the house sparrow. The adult's crown and nape are rich chestnut, and there is a kidney-shaped black ear patch on each pure white cheek; the chin, throat, and the area between the bill and throat are black. The upperparts are light brown, streaked with black, and the brown wings have two distinct narrow white bars. The legs are pale brown, and the bill is lead-blue in summer, becoming almost black in winter.

This sparrow is distinctive within its genus because there are no plumage differences between the sexes. Juveniles also resemble adults, although their colours tend to be duller. Its contrasting face pattern makes this species easily identifiable in all plumages; the smaller size and brown, not grey, crown are additional differences from the male house sparrow. Both adult and juvenile tree sparrows undergo a slow, complete moult in autumn and experience an increase in body mass, despite a reduction in stored fat. This change in mass is due to an increase in blood volume to support active feather growth, as well as a higher overall body water content.

The tree sparrow does not have a true song, but its vocalisations include an excited series of tschip calls made by unpaired or courting males. Other monosyllabic chirps are used for social interaction, and the flight call is a harsh teck. A study comparing the vocalisations of the introduced Missouri population with those of birds from Germany showed that the US birds had fewer shared syllable types (memes) and more structure within the population than the European sparrows. This may be due to the small size of the original North American population, resulting in a loss of genetic diversity.

== Taxonomy ==
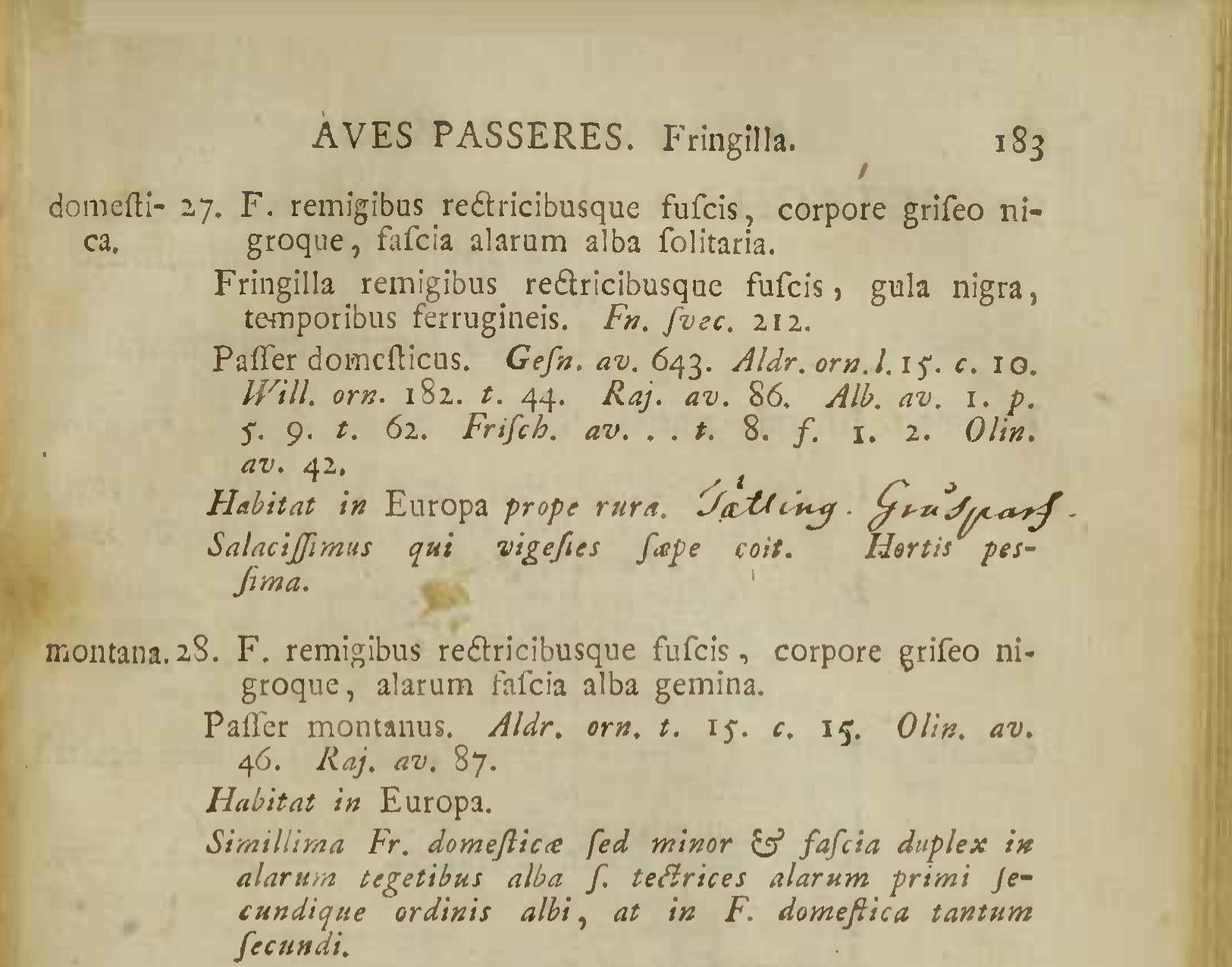
Description of the house and tree sparrows from the Systema naturae

The Old World sparrow genus Passer is a group of small passerine birds that is believed to have originated in Africa, and which contains 15–25 species depending on the authority. Its members are typically found in open, lightly wooded, habitats, although several species, notably the house sparrow (P. domesticus) have adapted to human habitations. Most species in the genus are typically 10–20 cm (3.9–7.9 in) long, predominantly brown or greyish birds with short square tails and stubby conical beaks. They are primarily ground-feeding seed-eaters, although they also consume invertebrates, especially when breeding. The Eurasian species is not closely related to the American tree sparrow (Spizelloides arborea), which is in a different family, the New World sparrows.

The tree sparrow's binomial name is derived from two Latin words: passer, "sparrow", and montanus, "of the mountains" (from mons "mountain"). The tree sparrow was first described by Carl Linnaeus in his 1758 Systema Naturae as Fringilla montana, but, along with the house sparrow, it was soon moved from the finches (family Fringillidae) into the new genus Passer created by French zoologist Mathurin Jacques Brisson in 1760. The tree sparrow's common name is given because it prefers tree holes for nesting. This name, and the scientific name montanus, do not appropriately describe this species's habitat preferences: the German name Feldsperling and the Hungarian name mezei veréb ("field sparrow") comes closer to doing so.

=== Subspecies ===
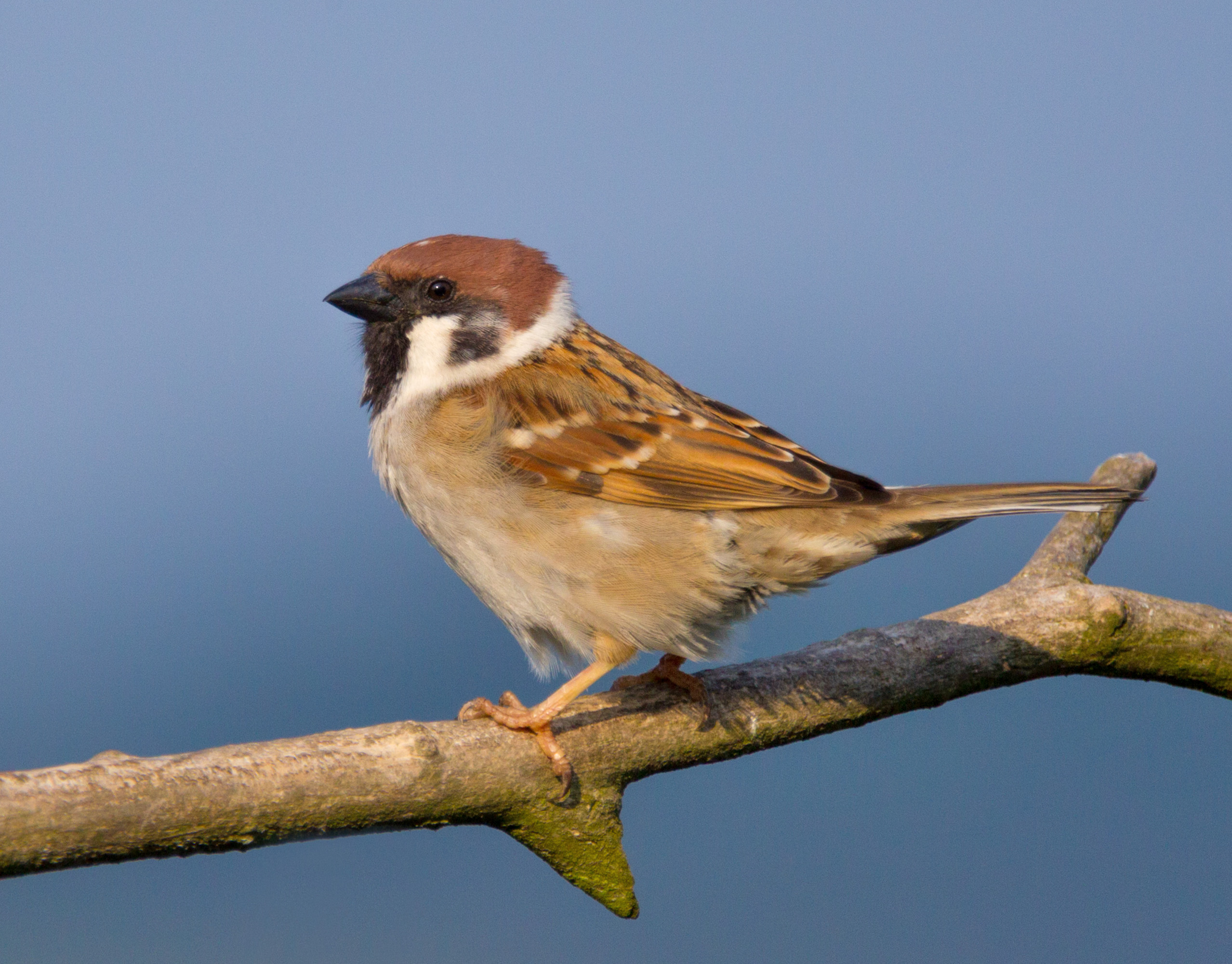
P. m. montanus

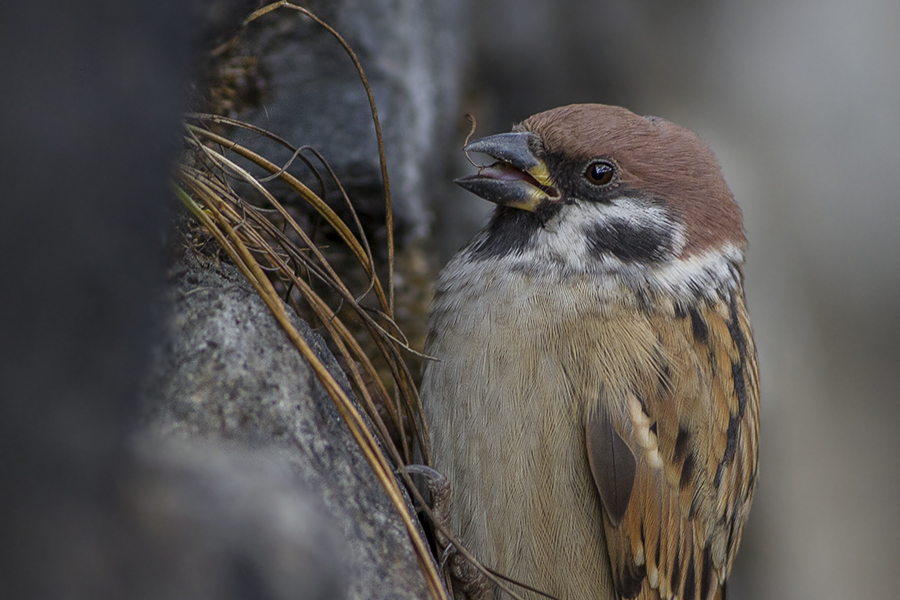
P. m. tibetanus

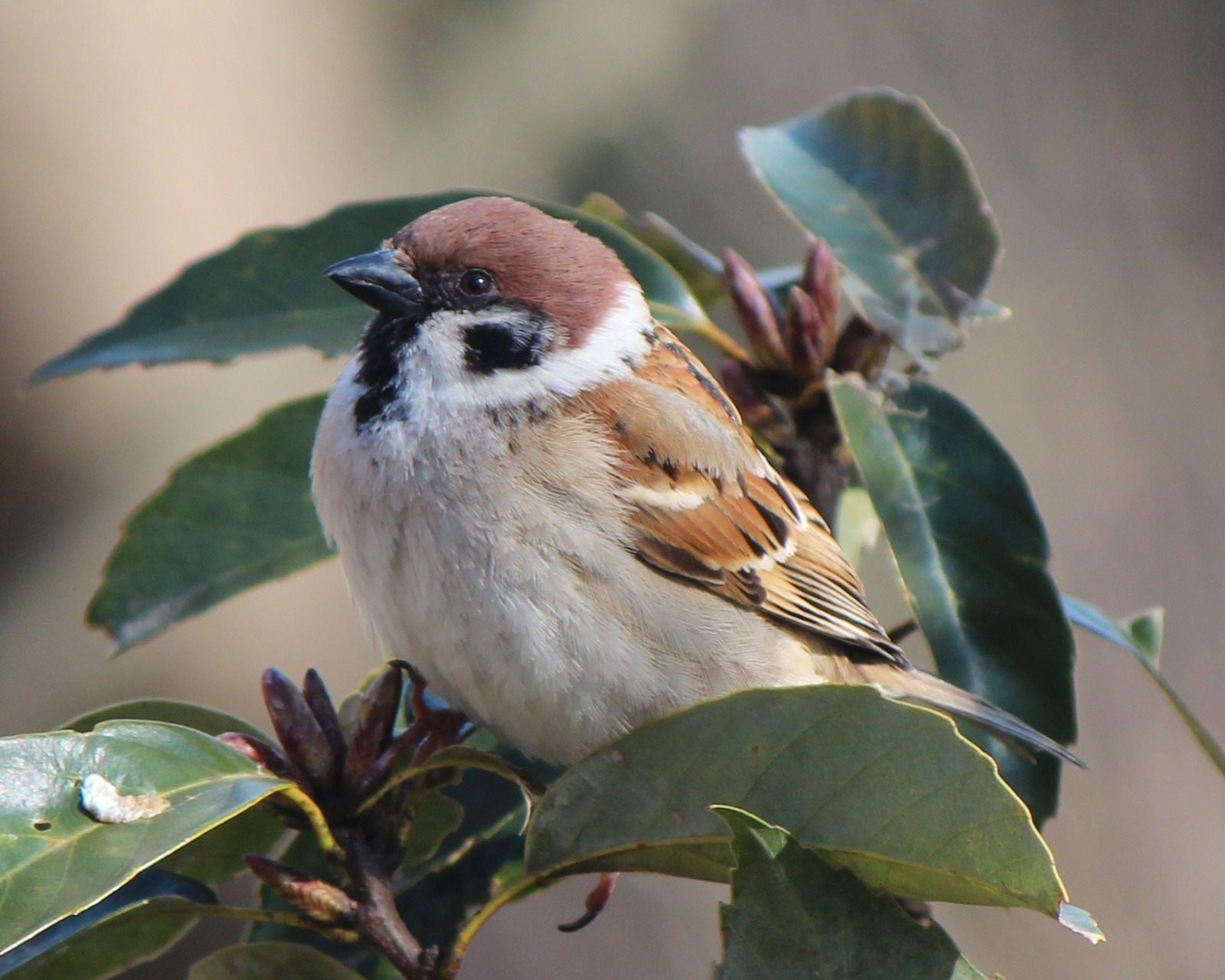
P. m. saturatus

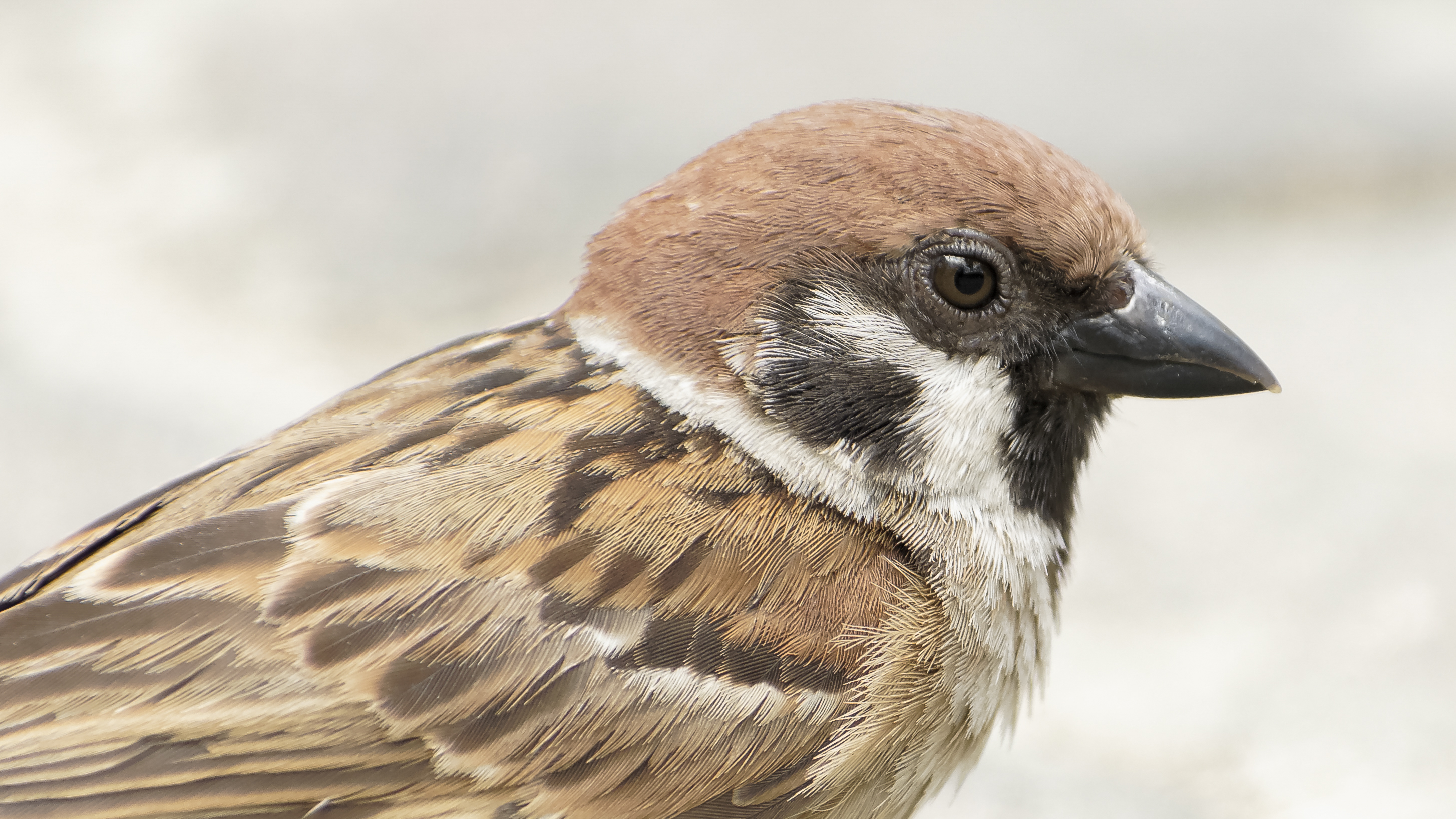
P. m. malaccensis

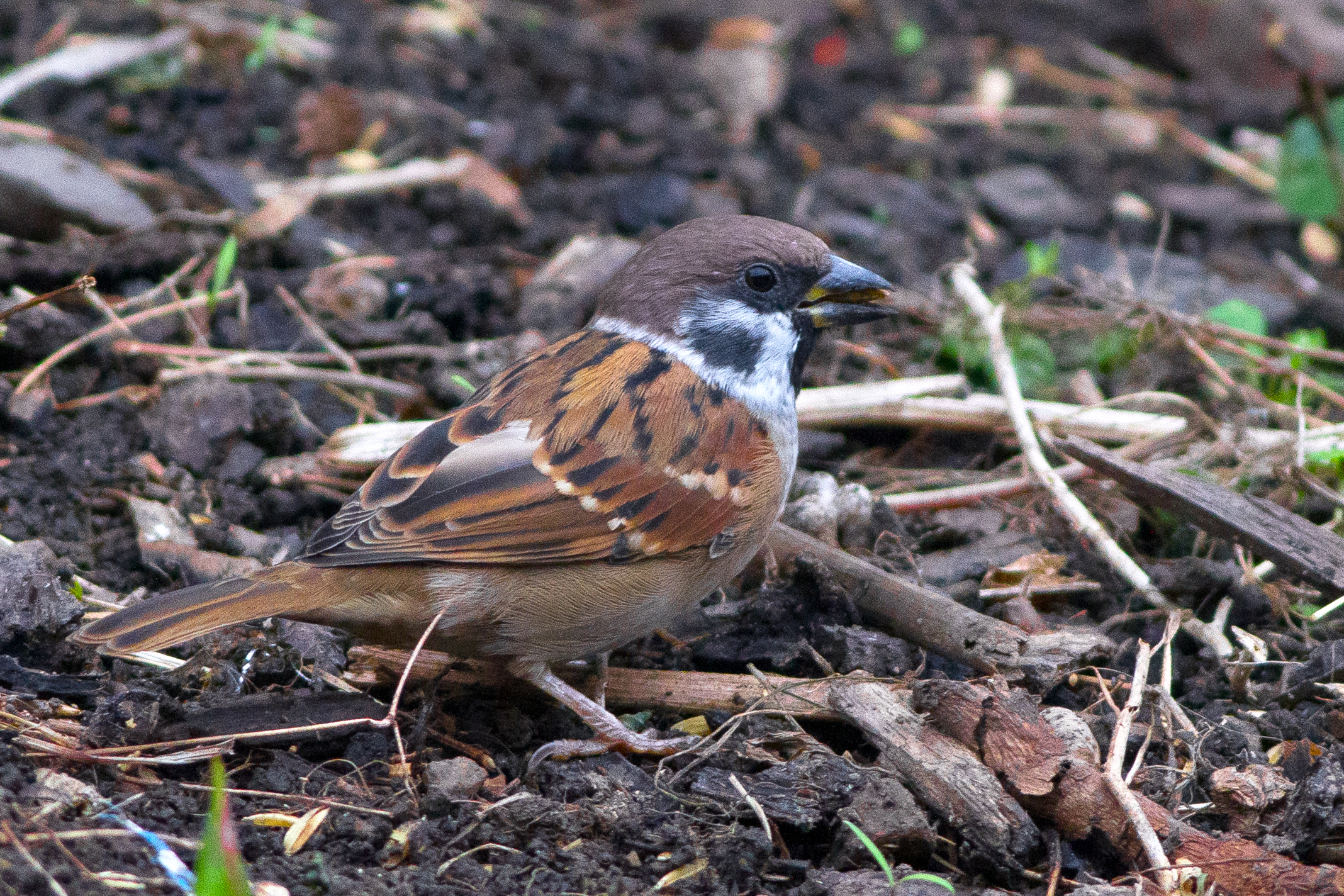
P. m. hepaticus

This species varies little in appearance across its large range, and the differences between the seven extant subspecies recognised by Clement are slight. At least 15 other subspecies have been proposed, but these are considered intermediates of the recognised subspecies.

- The European tree sparrow (P. m. montanus), the nominate subspecies, ranges across Europe except for the southwestern Iberian Peninsula, southern Greece and the former Yugoslavia. It also breeds in Asia east to the Lena River and south to the northern regions of Turkey, the Caucasus, Kazakhstan and Mongolia and in North Korea.
- The Caucasian tree sparrow (P. m. transcaucasicus), described by Sergei Aleksandrovich Buturlin in 1906, breeds from the southern regions of the Caucasus east to northern Iran. It is duller and greyer than the nominate subspecies.
- The Afghan tree sparrow (P. m. dilutus), described by Charles Wallace Richmond in 1856, is resident in extreme northeastern Iran, northern Pakistan and northwestern India. It also occurs further north, from Uzbekistan and Tajikistan east to China. Compared to P. m. montanus, it is paler, with sandy-brown upperparts.
- The Tibetan tree sparrow (P. m. tibetanus), the largest subspecies by size, was described by Stuart Baker in 1925. It is found in the northern Himalayas, from Nepal east through Tibet to northwestern China. It resembles P. m. dilutus, but is darker.
- P. m. saturatus, described by Leonhard Hess Stejneger in 1885, breeds in Sakhalin, the Kuril Islands, Japan, Taiwan and South Korea. It is deeper brown than the nominate subspecies and has a larger bill.
- P. m. malaccensis, described by Alphonse Dubois in 1885, is found from the southern Himalayas east to Hainan and Indonesia. It is a dark-coloured subspecies, like P. m. saturatus, but is smaller and more heavily streaked on its upperparts.
- P. m. hepaticus, described by Sidney Dillon Ripley in 1948, breeds from northeastern Assam to northwestern Burma. It is similar in appearance to P. m. saturatus, but redder on its head and upperparts.

== Distribution and habitat ==
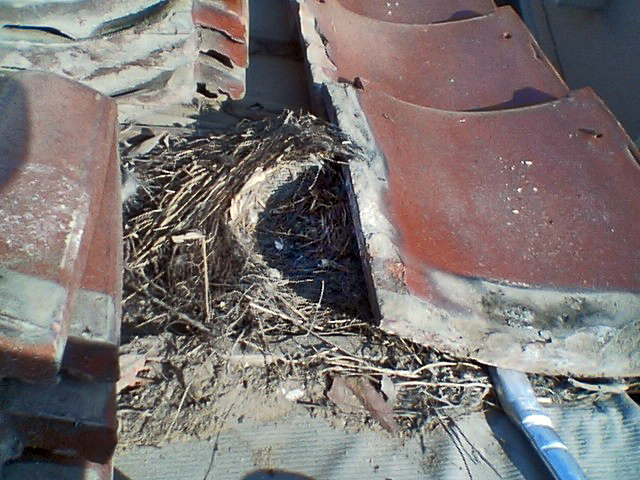
Urban nest under a roof tile of a wooden house in Japan

Tree sparrows in Japan

The tree sparrow's natural breeding range comprises most of temperate Europe and Asia south of about latitude 68°N (north of this the summers are too cold, with July average temperatures below 12 °C (54 °F)) and through Southeast Asia to Java and Bali. It formerly bred in the Faroes, Malta and Gozo. In South Asia it is found mainly in the temperate zone. It is sedentary over most of its extensive range, but northernmost breeding populations migrate south for the winter, and small numbers leave southern Europe for North Africa and the Middle East. The eastern subspecies P. m. dilutus reaches coastal Pakistan in winter and thousands of birds of this race move through eastern China in autumn.

The tree sparrow has been introduced outside its native range but has not always become established, possibly due to competition with the house sparrow. It was introduced successfully to Sardinia, eastern Indonesia, the Philippines and Micronesia, but introductions to New Zealand and Bermuda did not take root. Ship-carried birds colonised Borneo. This sparrow has occurred as a natural vagrant to Gibraltar, Tunisia, Algeria, Egypt, Israel, the United Arab Emirates, Morocco and Iceland. In North America, a population of about 15,000 birds has become established around St. Louis and neighbouring parts of Illinois and southeastern Iowa. These sparrows are descended from 20 birds (or 12 pairs, depending on the source) imported from Germany and released in late April 1870, probably by members of an acclimatisation society.

Within its limited US range of about 22,000 square kilometres (8,500 sq mi), the tree sparrow has to compete with the house sparrow in urban centres, and is therefore mainly found in parks, farms and rural woods. It has been suggested that one factor limiting the spread of tree sparrows in North America is the species' higher neophobia (novelty aversion) compared to house sparrows; one study specifically found that captive tree sparrows showed lower willingness to eat novel foods and habituated more slowly to novel objects than house sparrows. The American population is sometimes referred to as the "German sparrow", to distinguish it from both the native American tree sparrow species and the much more widespread "English" house sparrow. American birds have developed differences in size, genetics, and song from Old World populations as a result of prolonged isolation.

In Australia, the tree sparrow is present in Melbourne, towns in central and northern Victoria and some centres in the Riverina region of New South Wales. It is a prohibited species in Western Australia, where it often arrives on ships from Southeast Asia.

Despite its scientific name, Passer montanus, this is not typically a mountain species, and only reaches 700 m (2,300 ft) in Switzerland, although it has bred at 1,700 m (5,600 ft) in the northern Caucasus and as high as 4,270 m (14,010 ft) in Nepal. In Europe, it is frequently found on coasts with cliffs, in empty buildings, in pollarded willows along slow water courses, or in open countryside with small isolated patches of woodland. The tree sparrow shows a strong preference for nest-sites near wetland habitats and avoids breeding on intensively managed mixed farmland.

When the tree sparrow and the larger house sparrow are found in the same area, the house sparrow usually breeds in urban areas, while the smaller tree sparrow nests in the countryside. Where trees are scarce, as in Mongolia, both species may use man-made structures for nesting. The tree sparrow is a rural bird in Europe, but is an urban bird in eastern Asia. In southern and central Asia, both species of the genus Passer may be found around towns and villages. In parts of the Mediterranean, such as Italy, both the tree and the Italian or Spanish sparrows may be found in settlements. In Australia, the tree sparrow is largely an urban bird, whereas the house sparrow uses more natural habitats.

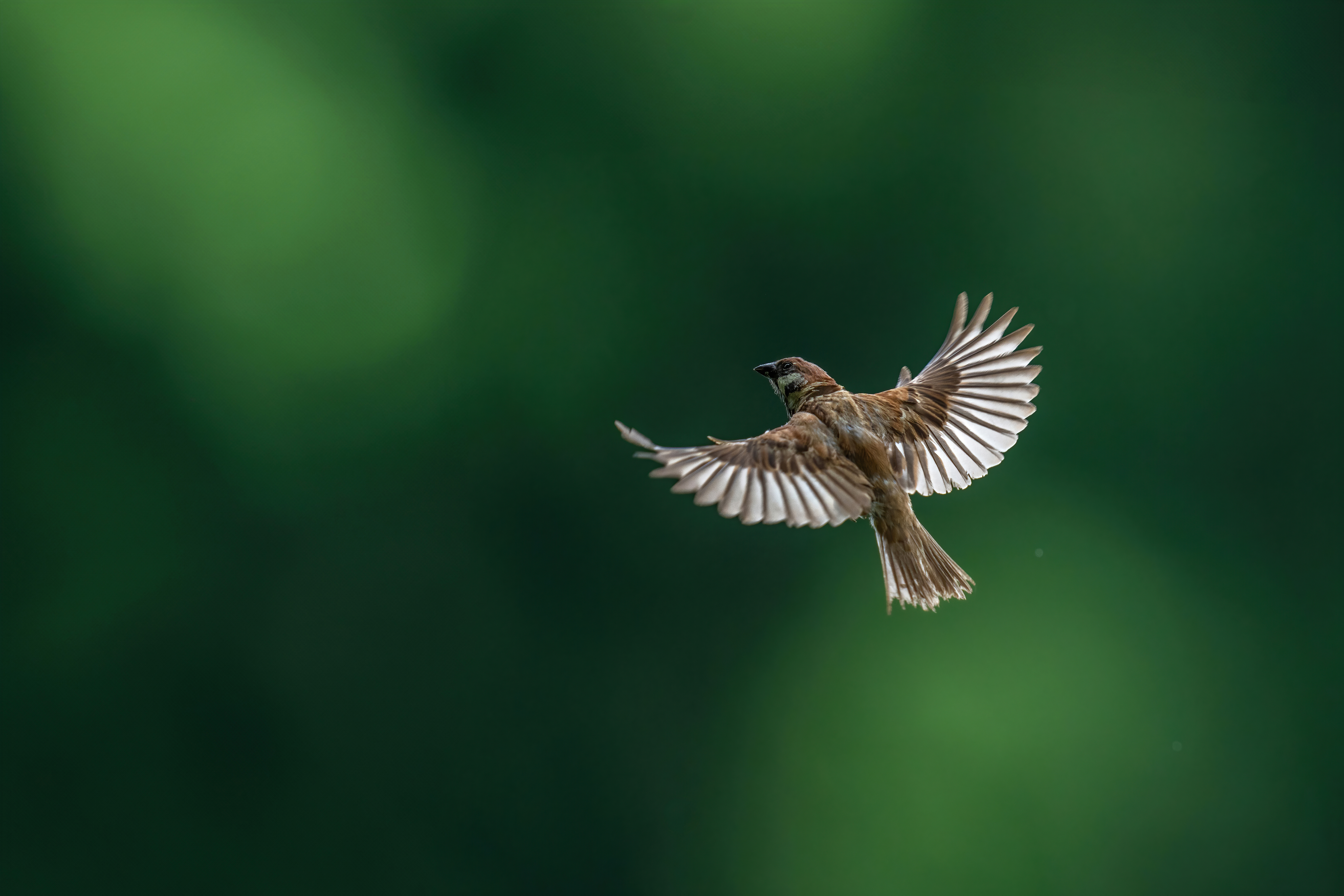
In flight

== Behaviour and ecology ==
=== Breeding ===
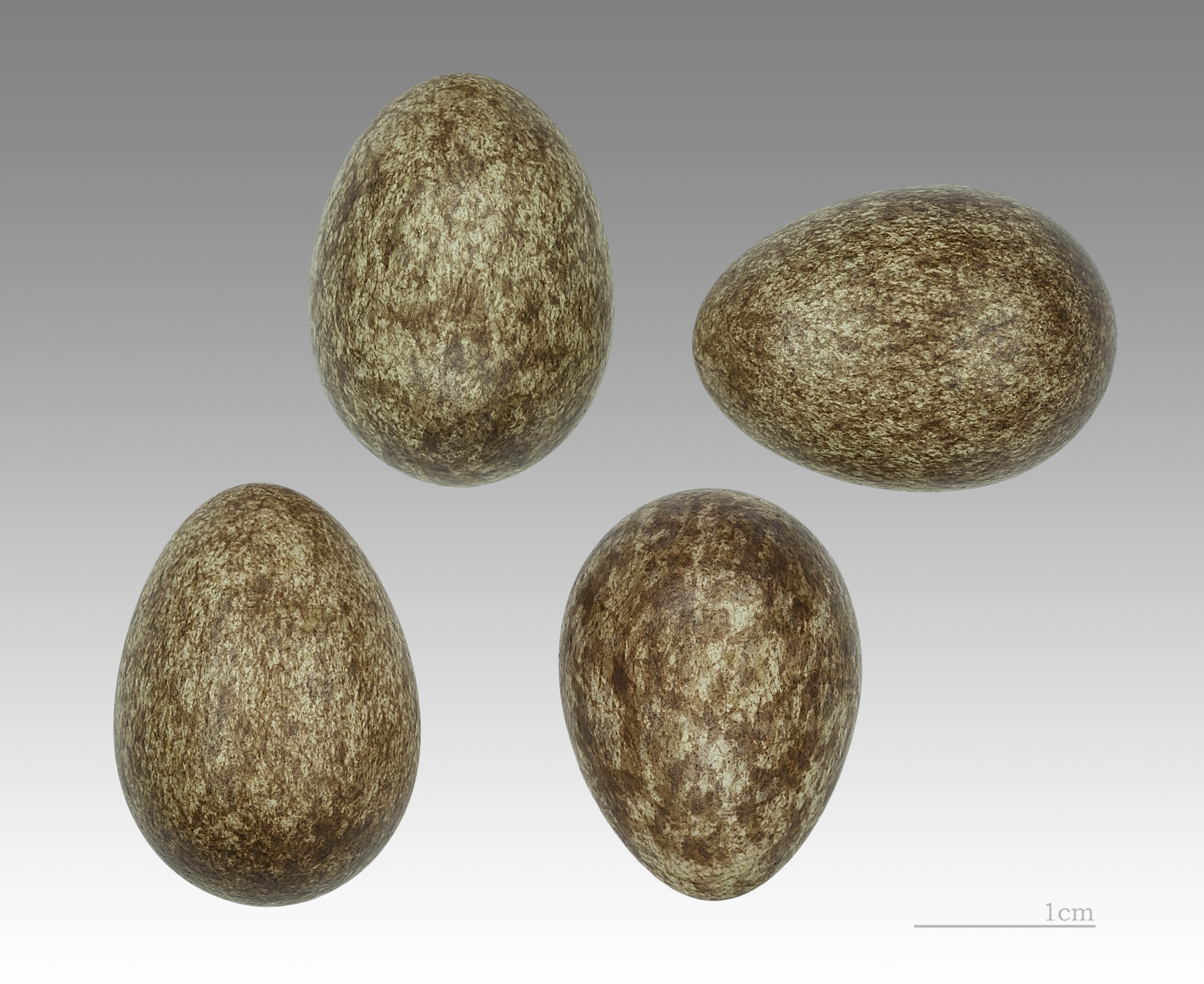
Museum de Toulouse

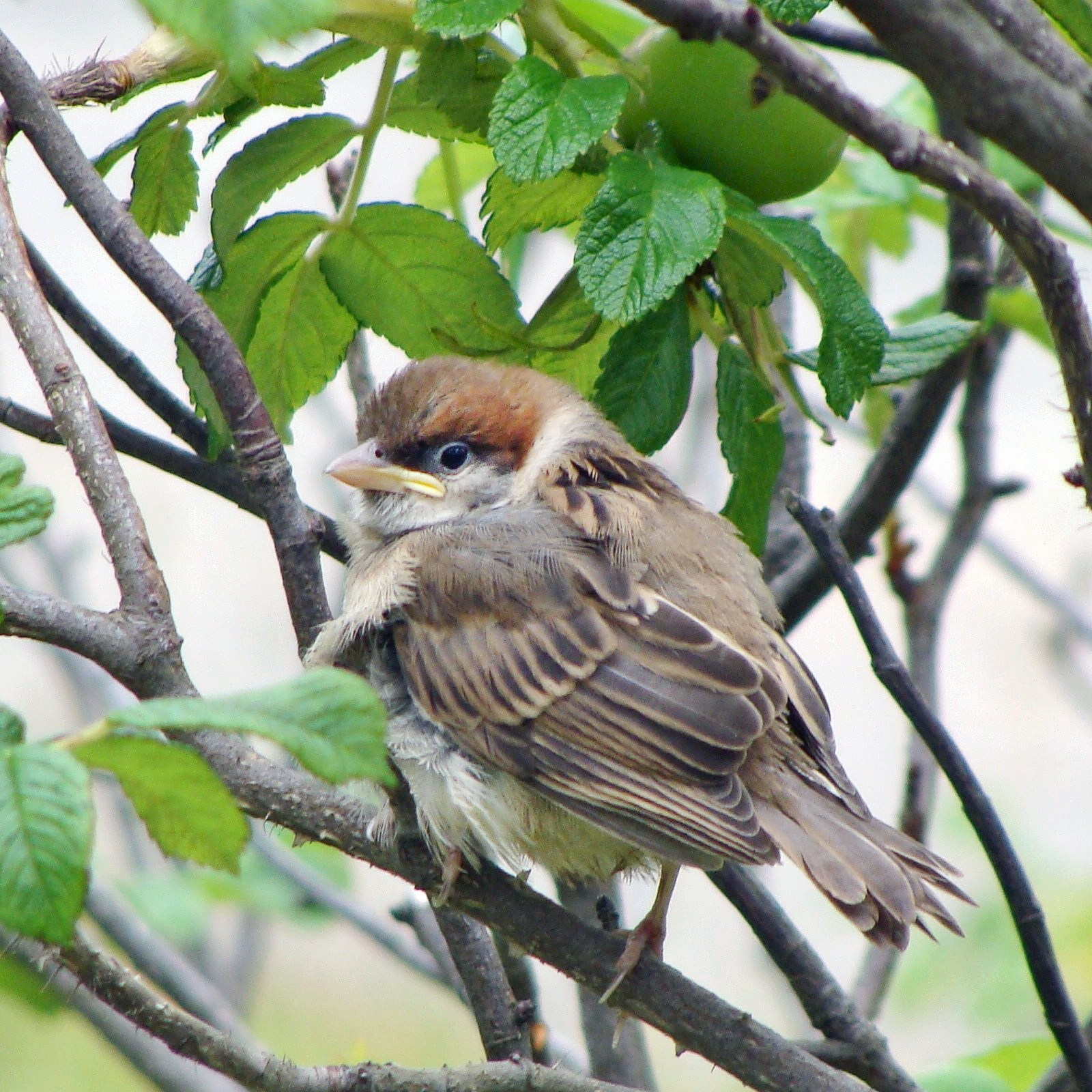
Fledgling

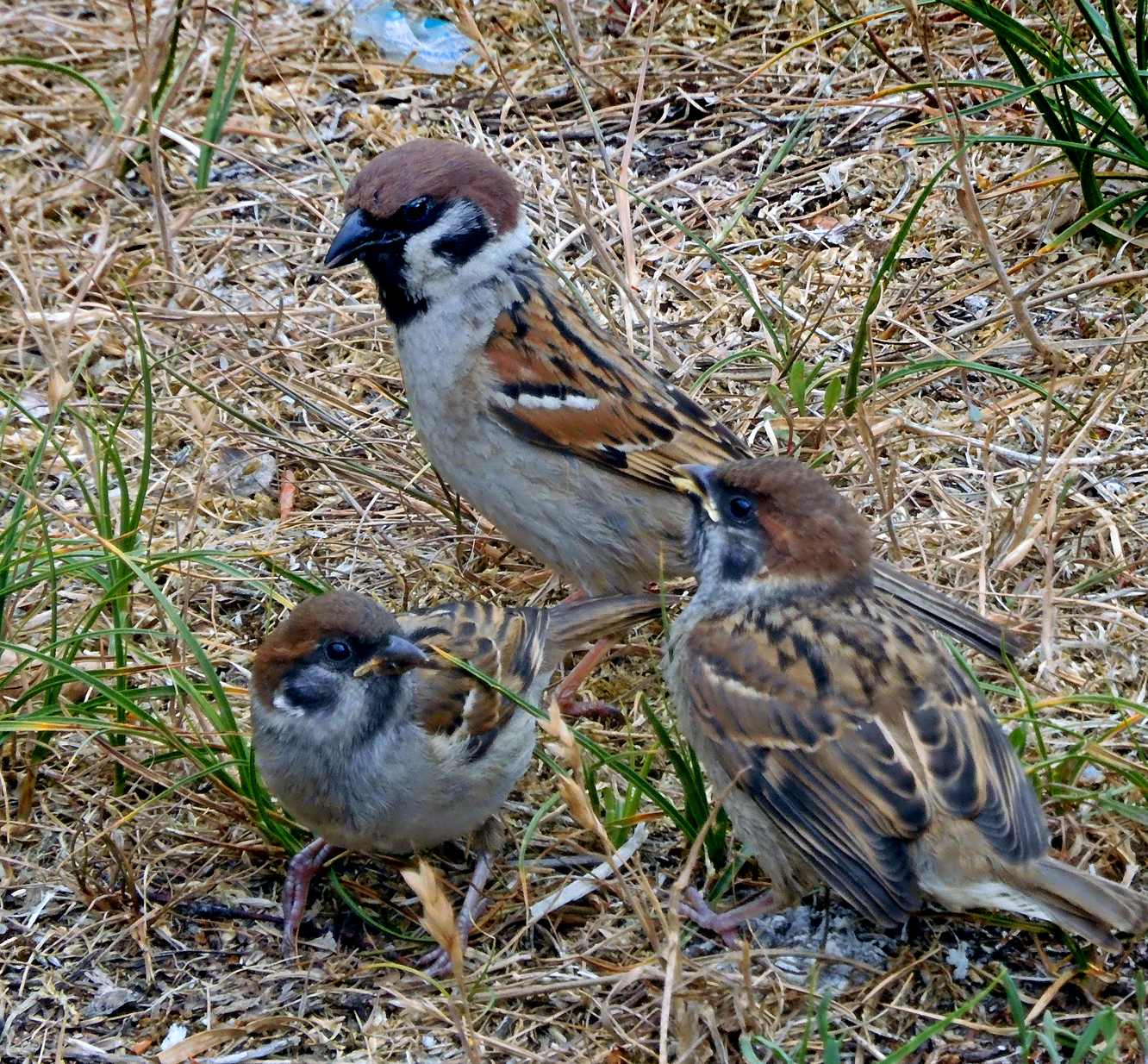
One adult and two juveniles

The tree sparrow reaches breeding maturity within a year of hatching, and typically builds its nest in a cavity in an old tree or rock face. Some nests are not situated in holes per se, but are built among roots of overhanging gorse or similar bushes. Roof cavities in houses may also be used. In the tropics, the crown of a palm tree or the ceiling of a veranda may serve as a nest site. This species will breed in the disused domed nest of a European magpie, or an active or unused stick nest of a large bird such as the white stork, white-tailed eagle, osprey, black kite or grey heron. It will sometimes attempt to take over the nest of other birds that breed in holes or enclosed spaces, such as the barn swallow, house martin, sand martin or European bee-eater.

Pairs may breed in isolation or loose colonies, and will readily use nest boxes. A Spanish study found that boxes made from a mixture of wood and concrete (woodcrete) had a much higher occupancy rate than wooden boxes (76.5% versus 33.5%). Birds nesting in woodcrete boxes laid their eggs earlier, had a shorter incubation period, and made more breeding attempts per season. There was no difference in clutch size or chick condition between nest box types, but reproductive success was higher in woodcrete, perhaps because the synthetic nests were 1.5 °C warmer than wooden ones.

In spring, the male calls from near the nest site to proclaim ownership and attract a mate. He may also carry nest material into the nest hole. These behaviours are repeated in autumn. The preferred locations for the autumn display are old tree sparrow nests, especially those where nestlings have hatched. Empty nest boxes, and sites used by house sparrows or other hole nesting birds, such as tits, pied flycatchers or common redstarts, are rarely used for the autumn display.

The untidy nest is made of hay, grass, wool or other materials and is lined with feathers, which improve its thermal insulation. A complete nest consists of three layers; base, lining and dome. The typical clutch is five or six eggs (rarely more than four in Malaysia), white to pale grey and heavily marked with spots, small blotches, or speckling; they are 20 mm × 14 mm (0.79 in × 0.55 in) in size and weigh 2.1 g (0.074 oz), of which 7% is shell. The eggs are incubated by both parents for 12–13 days before the altricial, naked chicks hatch. A further 15–18 days elapse before they fledge. Two or three broods may be raised each year. Birds breeding in colonies produce more eggs and fledglings from their first broods than solitary pairs do, but the reverse is true for second and third clutches. Females that copulate frequently tend to lay more eggs and have a shorter incubation period. Therefore, within-pair mating may indicate the reproductive ability of a pair. There is a significant level of promiscuity; in a Hungarian study, more than 9% of chicks were sired by extra-pair males, and 20% of the broods contained at least one extra-pair young.

Hybridisation between tree sparrows and house sparrows has been recorded in many parts of the world. Male hybrids tend to resemble tree sparrows, while females tend to resemble house sparrows. A breeding population in the Eastern Ghats of India, said to be introduced, may also hybridise with house sparrows. On at least one occasion a mixed pair has resulted in fertile young. A wild hybridisation with the resident sparrows of Malta, which are intermediate between the Spanish sparrow (P. hispaniolensis) and Italian sparrows (P. italiae), was recorded in Malta in 1975.

=== Feeding ===
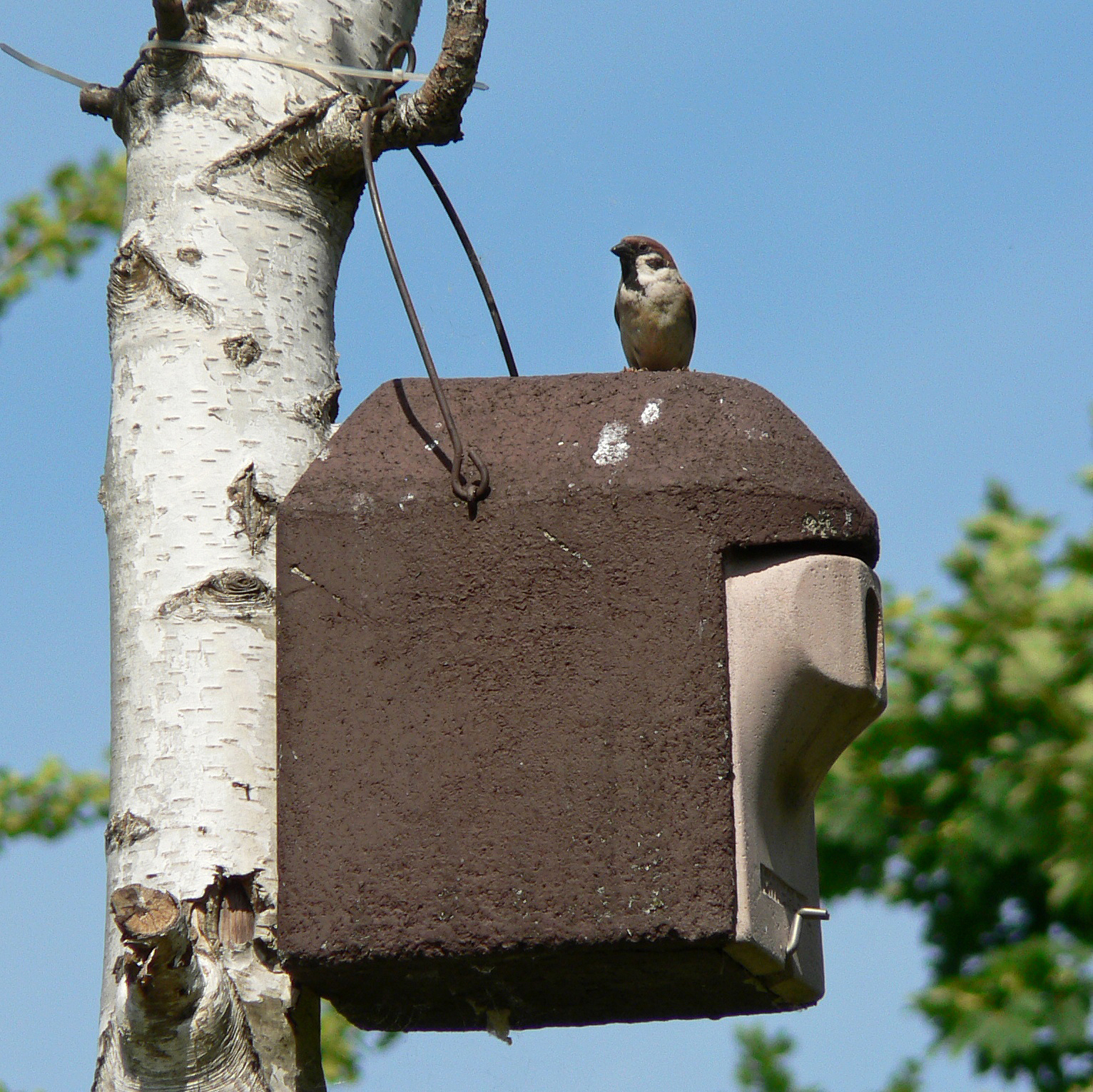
Nest box made of wood and concrete

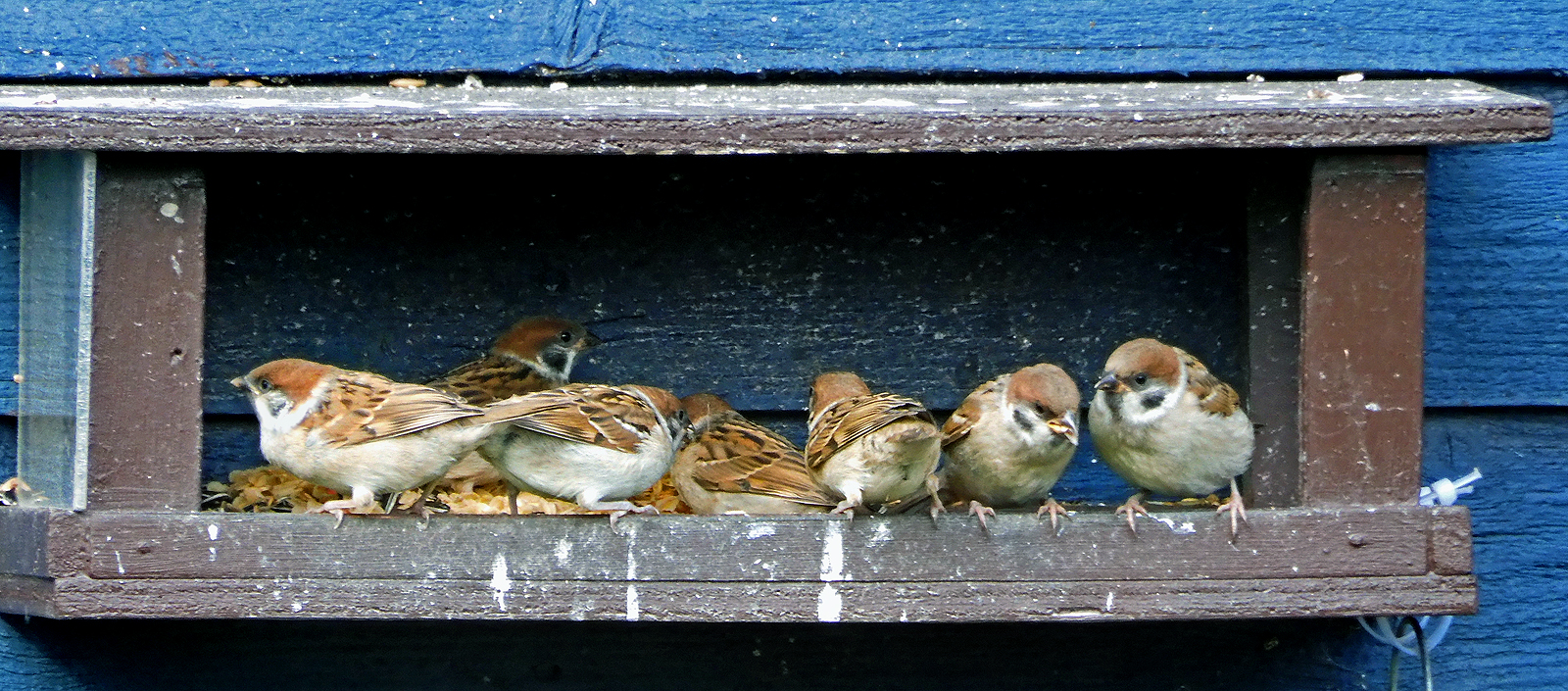
A very social bird, no problem sharing a bird feeder

The tree sparrow is a bird that predominantly eats seeds and grains. It feeds on the ground in flocks, often alongside house sparrows, finches, or buntings. Its diet includes weed seeds, such as chickweeds and goosefoot, spilled grain, and it may also visit bird feeders, especially for peanuts. During the breeding season, when the young are fed mainly on animal food, it will also feed on invertebrates, such as insects, woodlice, millipedes, centipedes, spiders and harvestmen.

Adults use a variety of wetlands when foraging for invertebrate prey to feed their young. Aquatic sites play a key role in providing the adequate diversity and availability of suitable invertebrate prey necessary for the successful rearing of chicks throughout the long breeding season of this multi-brooded species. However, large areas of formerly occupied farmland no longer provide these invertebrate resources due to the effects of intensive farming. The availability of supplementary seed food within 1 kilometre (0.62 mi) of the nest site does not influence nest-site choice, or affect the number of young raised.

In winter, seed resources are most likely to be a key limiting factor. At this time of year, individuals in a flock establish linear dominance hierarchies, but the size of the throat patch does not strongly correlate with position in the hierarchy. This is in contrast to the house sparrow, in which fights to establish dominance are reduced by displaying the throat patch. The size of this patch acts as a signalling "badge" of fitness. Although there is evidence that the black throat patch of male, but not female, tree sparrows predicts fighting success in foraging flocks.

The risk of predation affects feeding strategies. One study showed that when the distance between shelter and food sources increased, birds visited feeders in smaller flocks, spent less time there, and became more vigilant when far from shelter. Sparrows can feed as "producers", searching for food directly, or as "scroungers", just joining other flock members who have already found food. Scrounging was 30% more likely at exposed feeding sites, although this was not due to increased anti-predator vigilance. One possible explanation is that individuals with lower fat reserves use riskier places.

=== Predators ===
The Eurasian sparrowhawk is a widespread predator

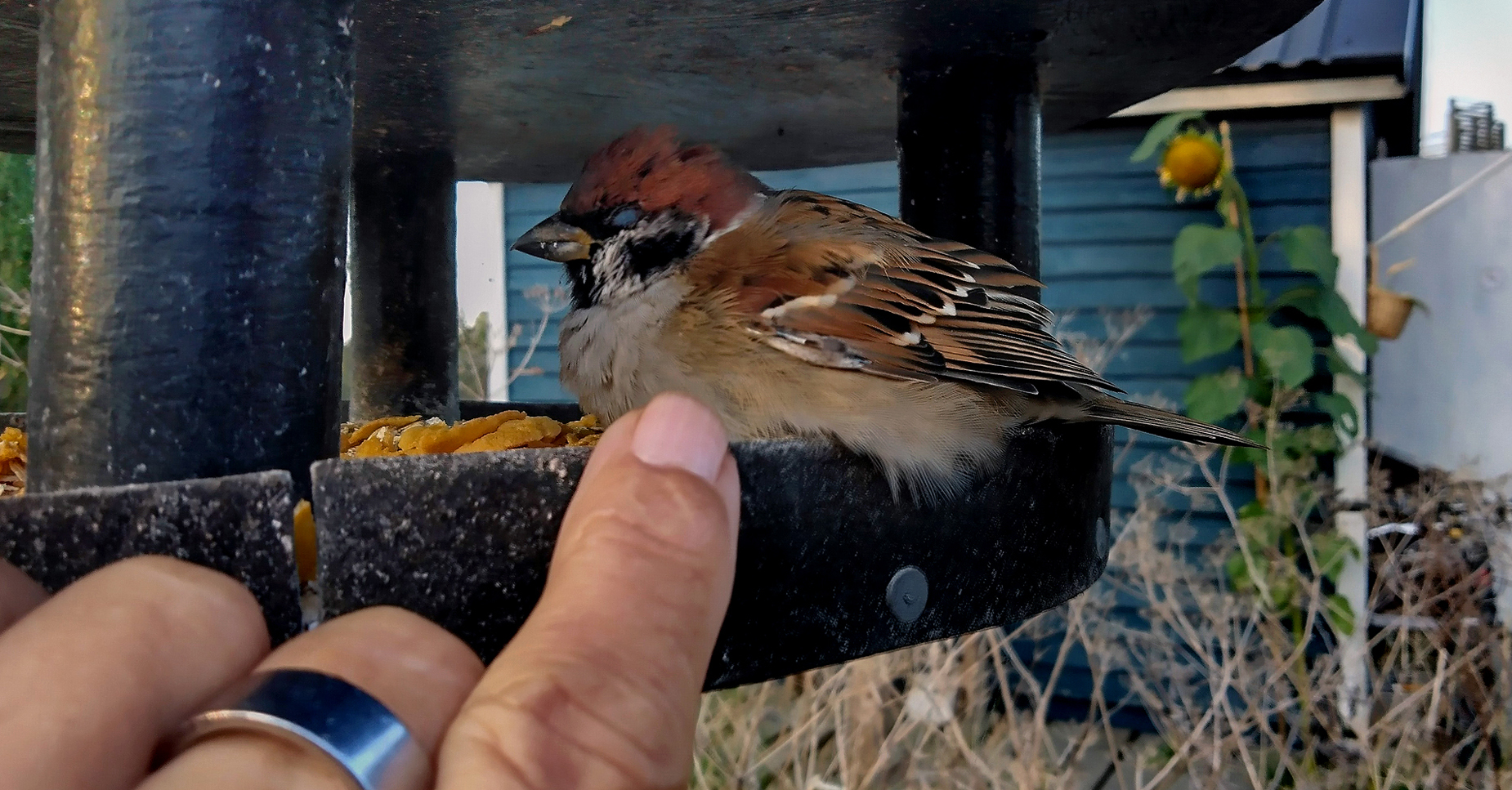
A sick and dying individual, apathetic and unresponsive to touch.

Predators of the tree sparrow include a variety of accipiters, falcons and owls, such as the Eurasian sparrowhawk, common kestrel, little owl, and sometimes long-eared owl and white stork. It does not appear to be at an increased risk of predation during its autumn moult, despite having fewer flight feathers at that time. Nests may be raided by Eurasian magpies, jays, least weasels, rats, cats, and constricting snakes such as the horseshoe whip snake.

Many species of bird lice are present on the birds and in their nests, and mites of the genus Knemidocoptes have been known to infest populations, resulting in lesions on the legs and toes. Parasitisation of nestlings by Protocalliphora blow-fly larvae is a significant factor in nestling mortality. Egg size does not influence nestling mortality, but chicks from large eggs grow faster.

Tree sparrows are susceptible to bacterial and viral infections. It has been shown that bacteria play an important role in eggs failing to hatch and in nestling mortality, and mass deaths due to Salmonella infection have been noted in Japan. Avian malaria parasites have been found in the blood of many populations, and birds in China were found to harbour a strain of H5N1 that was highly virulent to chickens.

The immune response of tree sparrows is weaker than that of house sparrows, which has been suggested as an explanation for the latter's greater invasive potential. The house sparrow and tree sparrow are the most frequent victims of roadkill on the roads of Central, Eastern and Southern Europe. The maximum recorded age is 13.1 years, but three years is a typical lifespan.

=== Temperature regulation ===
Tree sparrows exhibit various physiological adaptations to seasonal changes in temperature and photoperiod. When exposed to shorter photoperiods and colder temperatures in winter, tree sparrows increase their body mass and basal metabolic rate, as well as the activity of the cytochrome c oxidase enzyme and thyroid hormone hormones. Temperature has a greater effect than photoperiod. Increasing body mass allows these birds to store more energy, while their increased basal metabolic rate is due to the higher amount of energy needed to maintain their body temperature in colder conditions. Another study also found that during the winter, tree sparrows also exhibited higher levels of thyroid hormone T3, which helps regulate the body's use of energy. The birds' increased T3 levels was correlated with increased heat production.

== Conservation status ==
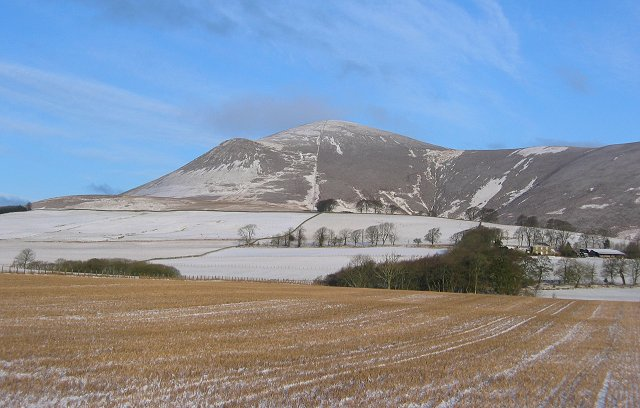
Winter stubble is a seasonal food resource.

The tree sparrow has an estimated range of 98.3 million square kilometres (38.0 million sq mi) and a population of 190–310 million individuals. Although its population is declining, the species is not believed to be approaching the thresholds for the population decline criterion of the IUCN Red List (that is, declining more than 30% in 10 years or three generations). For these reasons, the species' conservation status is evaluated at the global level as being of Least Concern.

After the ending of the Four Pests campaign, the species was extirpated from China, which afterwards imported tree sparrows from Russia to recover its population. Although the tree sparrow has been expanding its range in Fennoscandia and eastern Europe, populations have been declining in much of western Europe, a trend reflected in other farmland birds such as the skylark, corn bunting and northern lapwing. From 1980 to 2003, common farmland bird numbers fell by 28%. The collapse in populations seems to have been particularly severe in Great Britain, where there was a 95% decline between 1970 and 1998, and Ireland, which had only 1,000–1,500 pairs in the late 1990s. In the British Isles, such declines may be due to natural fluctuations, to which tree sparrows are known to be prone. Breeding performance has improved substantially as population sizes have decreased, suggesting that decreases in productivity were not responsible for the decline and that survival was the critical factor. The large decline in tree sparrow numbers is probably the result of agricultural intensification and specialisation, particularly the increased use of herbicides and a trend towards autumn-sown crops (at the expense of spring-sown crops that produce stubble fields in winter). The change from mixed to specialised farming and the increased use of insecticides has reduced the amount of insect food available for nestlings.

== Relationships with humans ==
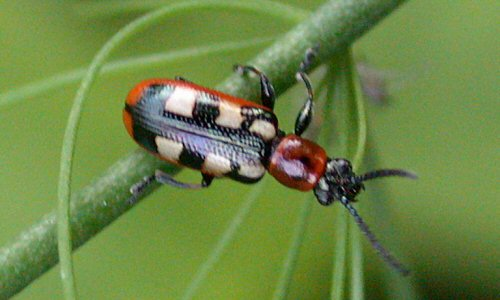
A horticultural pest, the common asparagus beetle is a regular prey item

The tree sparrow is considered a pest in some areas. In Australia, for example, it damages many cereal and fruit crops, and its droppings spoil cereal crops, animal feed and stored grain. Quarantine rules prohibit the transport of this species into Western Australia.

In the 19th century, mass campaigns to catch and kill sparrows were launched in several European countries, including France, Prussia, Hungary, Baden.

In April 1958, the paramount leader of China, Mao Zedong, attempted to reduce the damage to crops caused by tree sparrows, which was estimated to be 4.5 kg (9.9 lb) of grain per bird each year, by mobilising millions of people to kill sparrows through various means. Although this was successful in reducing the sparrow population, the Eliminate Sparrows campaign overlooked the fact that the birds also consumed large numbers of locusts and other insect pests. Crop yields subsequently collapsed, exacerbating the Great Chinese Famine, which led to the deaths of 30 million people between 1959 and 1961. The tree sparrow's consumption of insects has led to its use in agriculture to control fruit tree pests and the common asparagus beetle (Crioceris aspergi).

The tree sparrow has long been a popular subject in Chinese and Japanese art. It is often depicted either perched on a plant spray or flying in a flock. Representations by Oriental artists, including Hiroshige, have featured on postage stamps issued by Antigua and Barbuda, the Central African Republic, China, and the Gambia. More straightforward illustrations were used on stamps issued by Belarus, Belgium, Cambodia, Estonia, and Taiwan. The fluttering of the bird gave rise to a traditional Japanese dance, the Suzume Odori, developed in Sendai, which was depicted by artists such as Hokusai.

In the Philippines, where it is one of several species referred to as maya, and is sometimes specifically referred to as the "mayang simbahan" ("church maya" or "church sparrow"), the tree sparrow is the most common bird in the cities. Many urban Filipinos confuse it with the former national bird of the Philippines, the black-headed munia – also called a maya, but specifically differentiated in folk taxa as the "mayang pula" ("red maya").

In popular culture

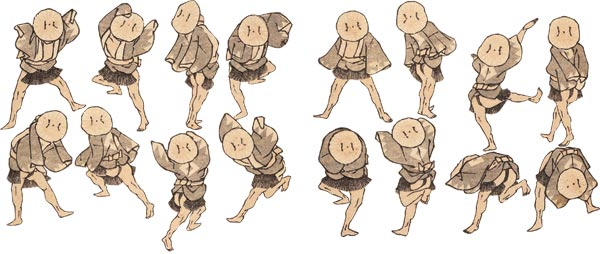
Detail from Hokusai's Suzume Odori, depicting the Japanese traditional dance inspired by sparrows

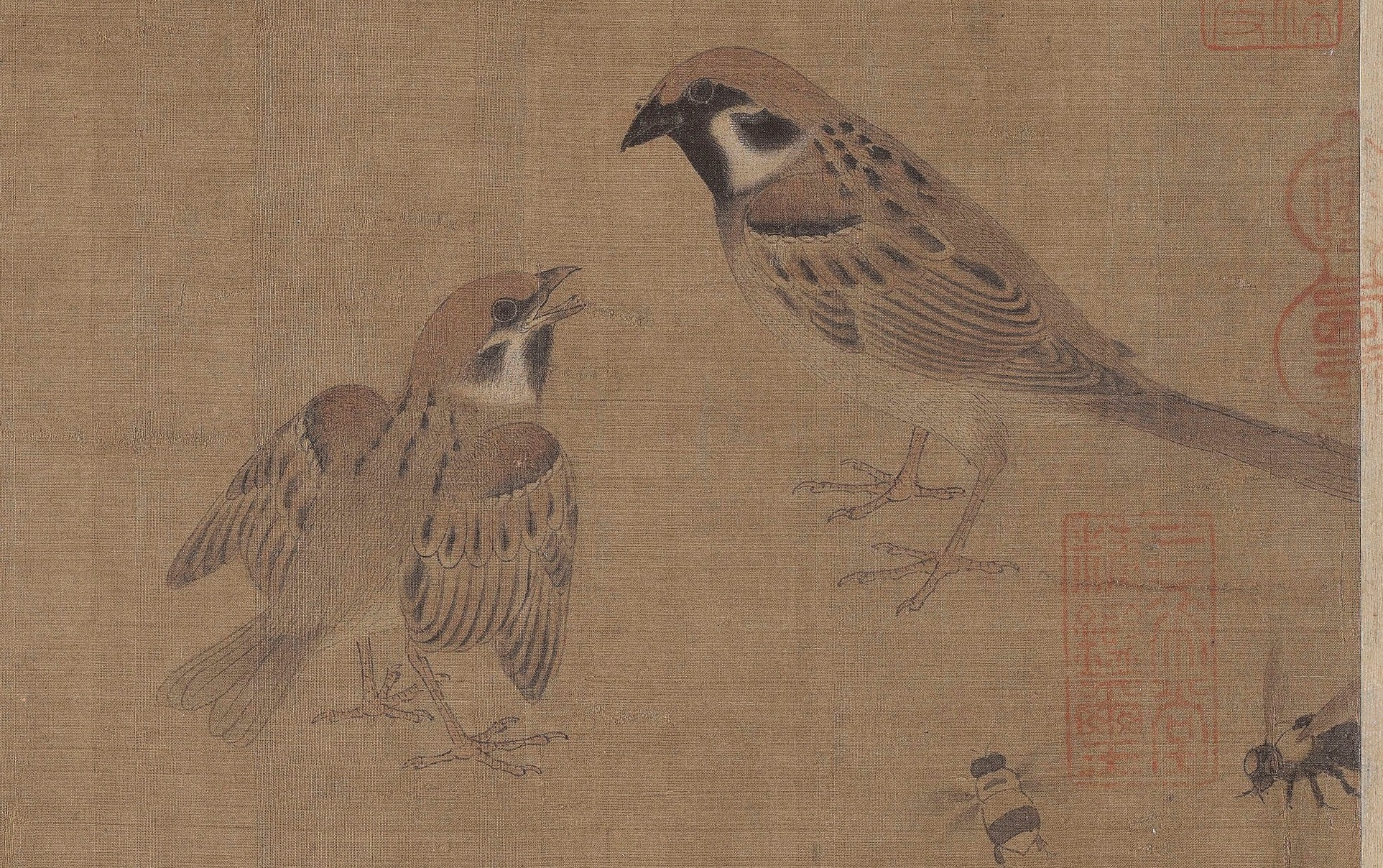
Part of an ink on silk painting by Huang Quan c. 965 CE showing a fledgling soliciting food from an adult
