= Maya (bird) =

Philippine folk taxonomy for small birds

The term maya refers to a folk taxonomy often used in the Philippines to refer to a variety of small, commonly observed passerine birds, including a number of sparrows, finches and munias.

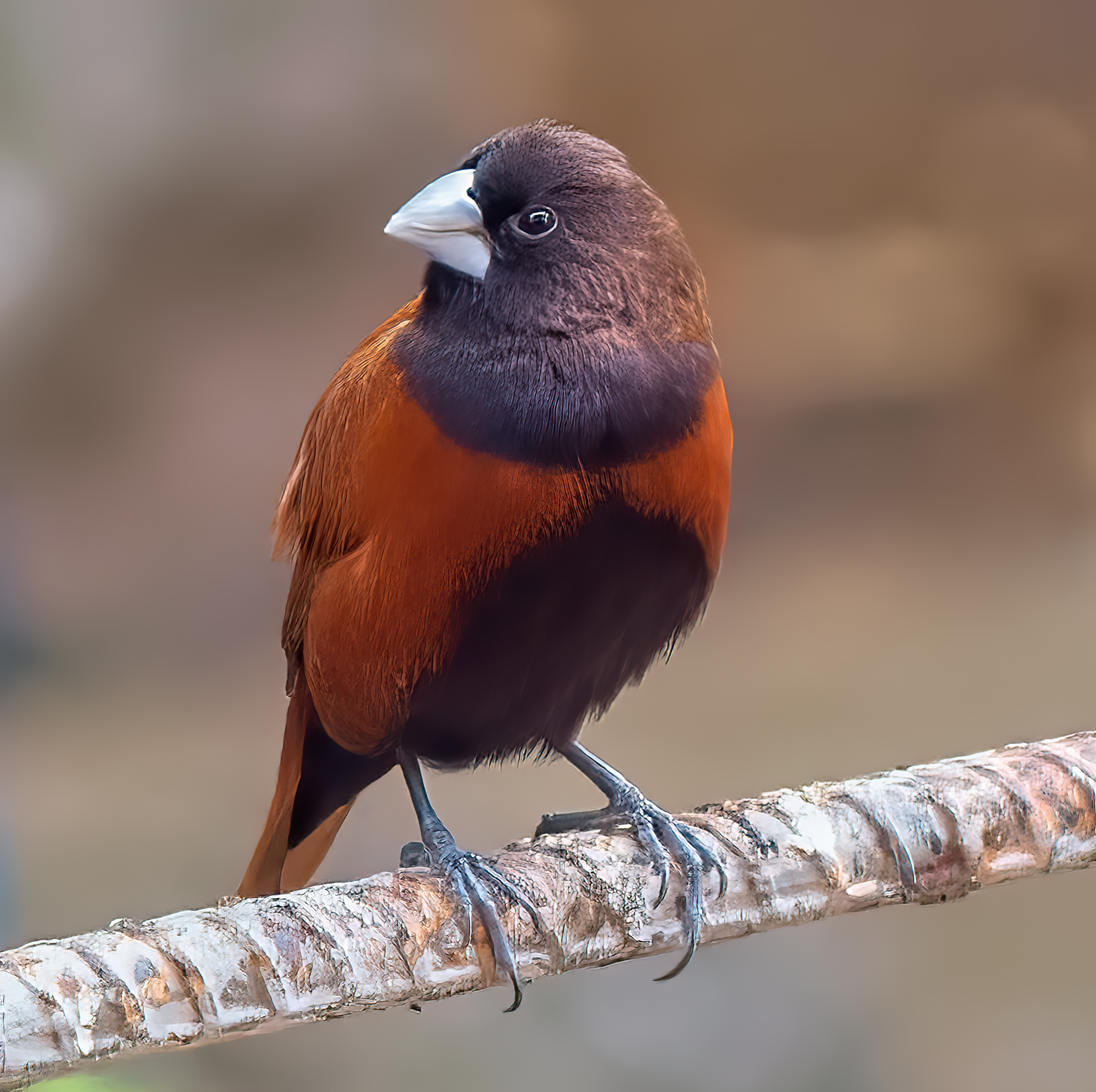
Mayang pula, or chestnut munia (Lonchura atricapilla)

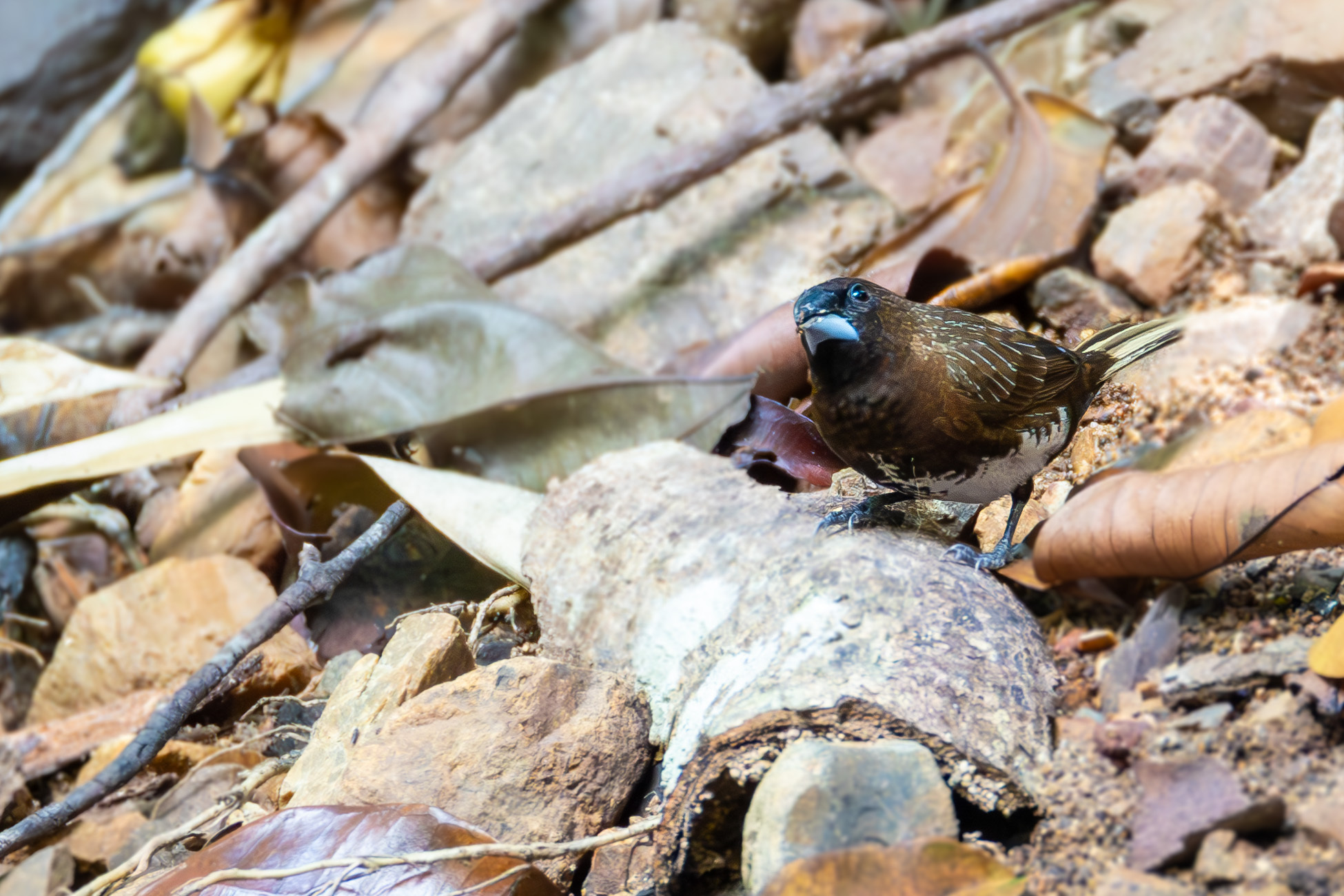
Mayang bato, or white-bellied munia (Lonchura leucogastra)

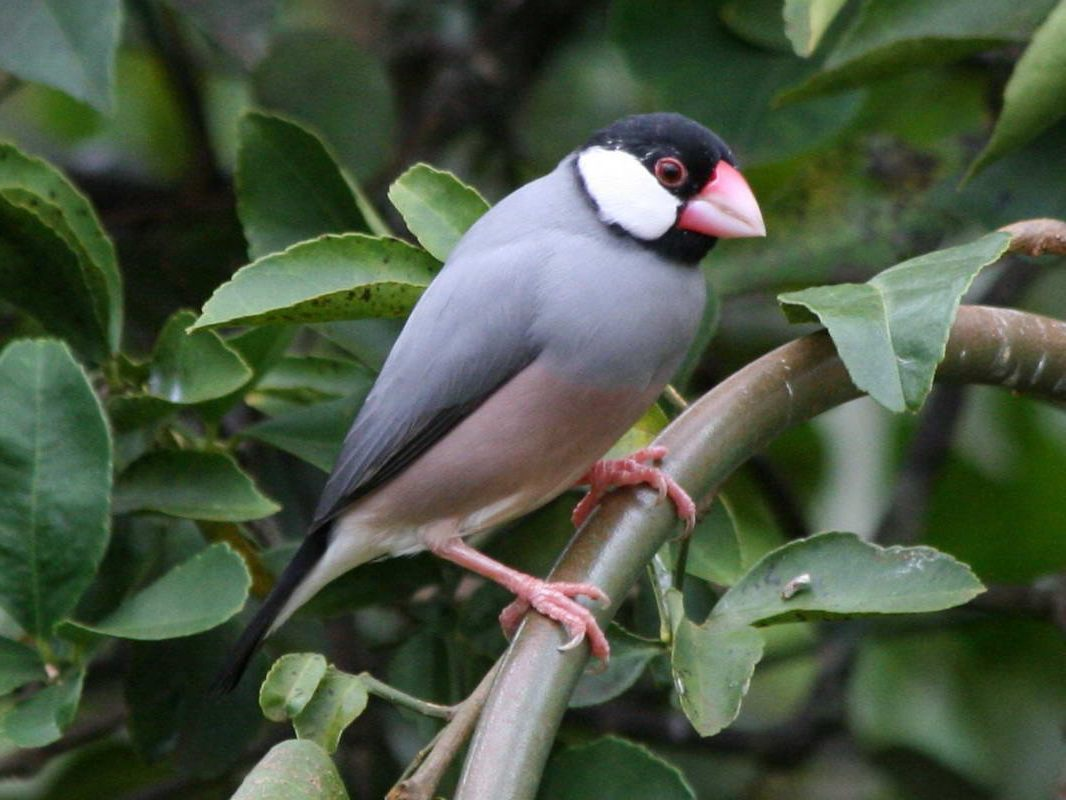
Mayang costa, or Java sparrow (Padda oryzivora)

This group includes Lonchura atricapilla, specifically referred to by the common name mayang pulá ("red maya"), which was recognized as the national bird of the Philippines until 1995, when then-President Fidel V. Ramos formally transferred the honorific to the Philippine eagle.

It also includes the Eurasian tree sparrow, Passer montanus, introduced from Europe and locally referred to as mayang simbahan ("church maya")– an invasive species predominant in urban areas, leading urban Filipinos to mistakenly think it is the only species referred to as "maya."

== Species ==
Some of the species counted under the category of "maya" include:

- Lonchura atricapilla – locally referred to as mayang pula ("red maya") in Filipino, national bird of the Philippines until 1995. Formerly considered conspecific with Lonchura malacca, with which it is still often confused. Also sometimes referred to as mayang bungol (deaf maya), or mayang bukid (ricefield maya).
- Erythrura viridifacies and Erythrura hyperythra – locally referred to as mayang kawayan ("bamboo maya") due to their frequent association with flowering bamboos.
- Lonchura leucogastra – locally referred to as mayang bato ("rock maya") in Filipino.
- Lonchura punctulata – locally referred to as mayang paking (another variation of "deaf maya").
- Padda oryzivora – locally referred to mayang costa ("coast maya").
- Passer montanus – the Eurasian tree sparrow, introduced from Europe and locally referred to as mayang simbahan ("church maya") in Filipino.
- Oriolus steerii – the Philippine oriole is also sometimes generically referred to as "maya", and is sometimes confused for Lonchura atricapilla or Passer montanus due to naming.

=== Naming and confusion ===
Due to forces of globalization and urbanization, Filipinos have become less familiar with the identity of bird species in their area over time. As a result, the use of the catch-all name "maya" for multiple species has resulted in them occasionally being confused for one another, despite readily observable morphological differences.

Particularly in urban areas, where the Eurasian tree sparrow has become predominant as an invasive species, "maya" is often mistakenly thought to be the name of this single species, in spite of it not being originally native to the Philippines.
