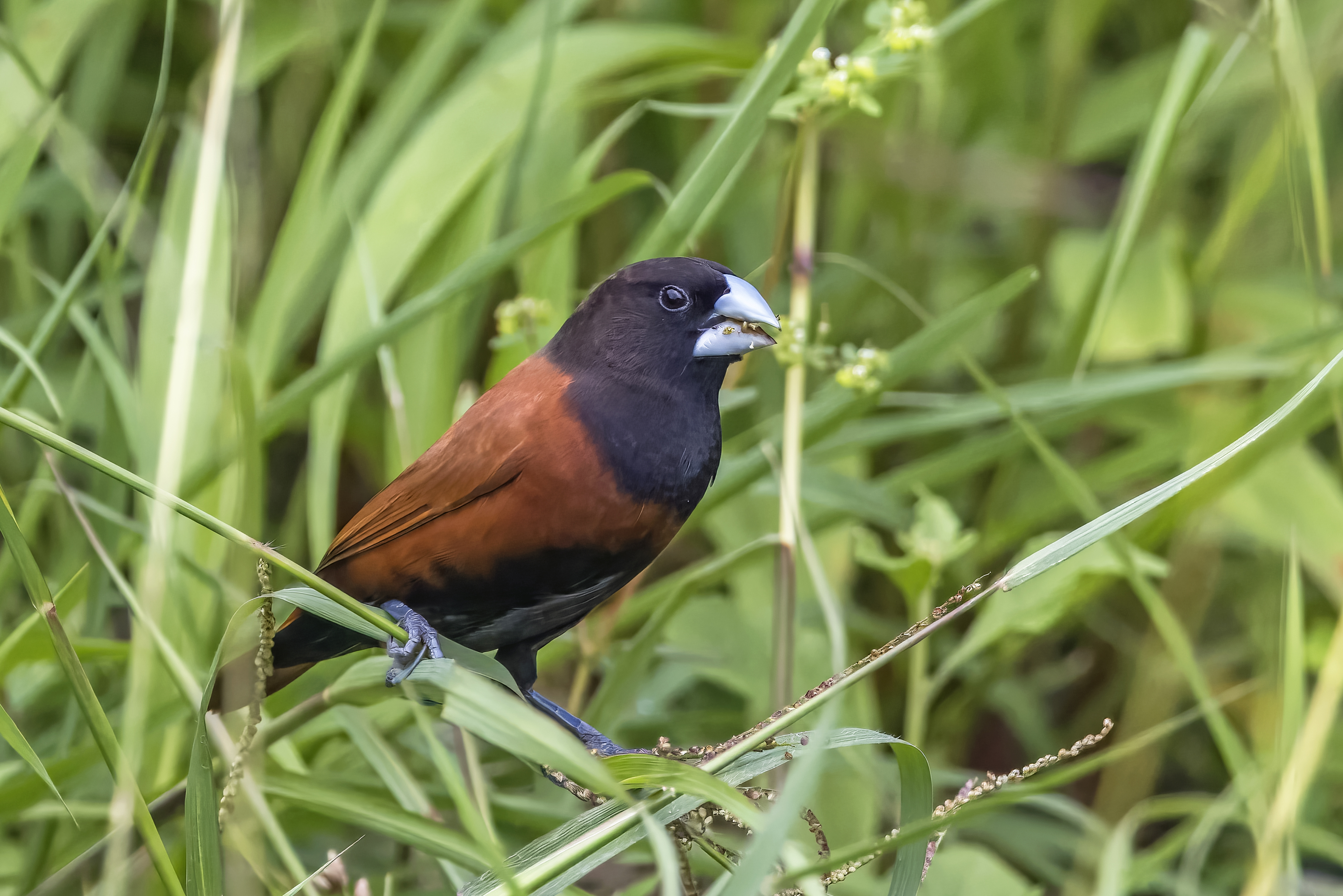
- Adult
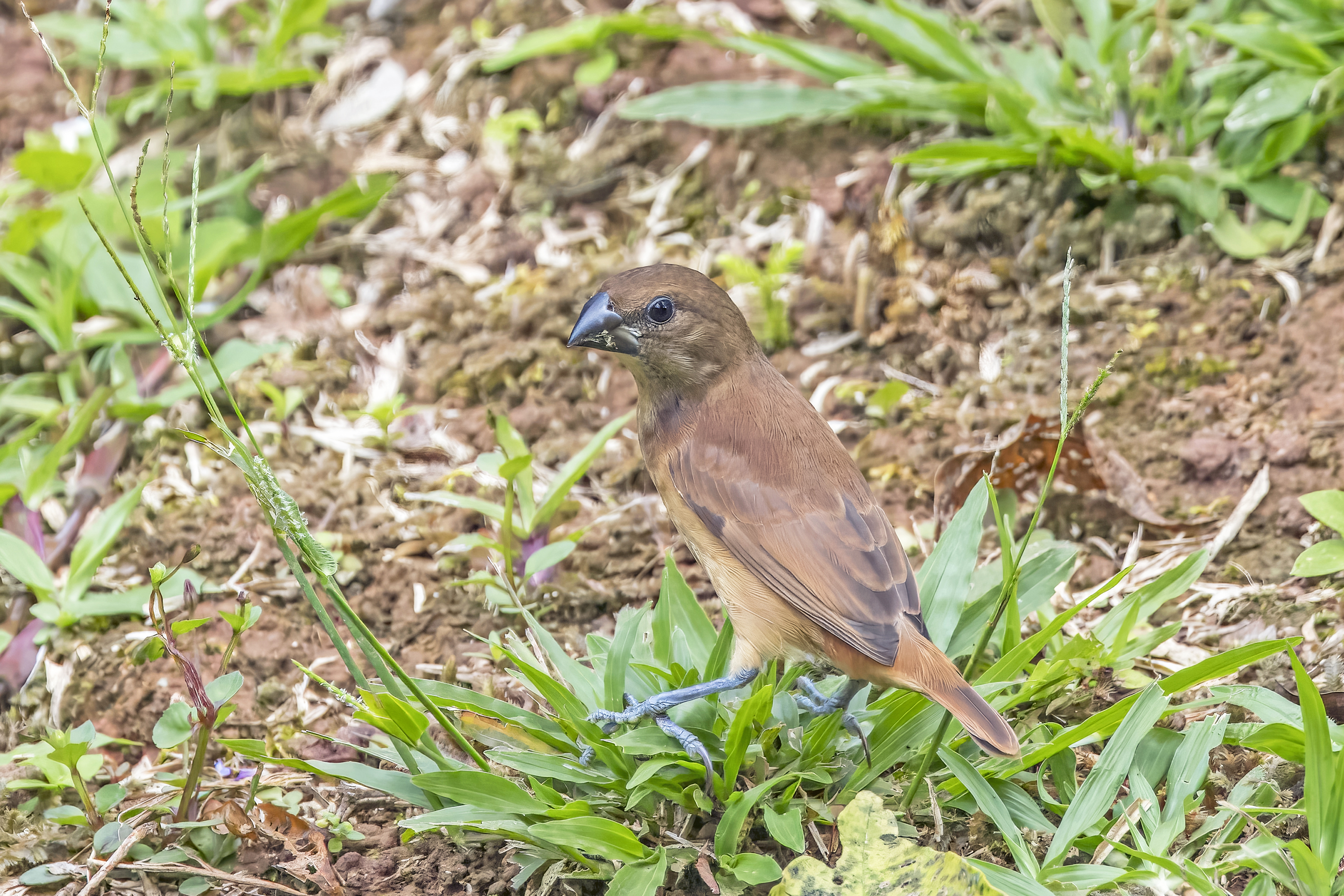
- Juvenile both L. a. jagori in Palau

Conservation status
- Least Concern (IUCN 3.1)

Scientific classification
- Kingdom: Animalia
- Phylum: Chordata
- Class: Aves
- Order: Passeriformes
- Family: Estrildidae
- Genus: Lonchura
- Species: L. atricapilla

Binomial name
- Lonchura atricapilla (Vieillot, 1807)
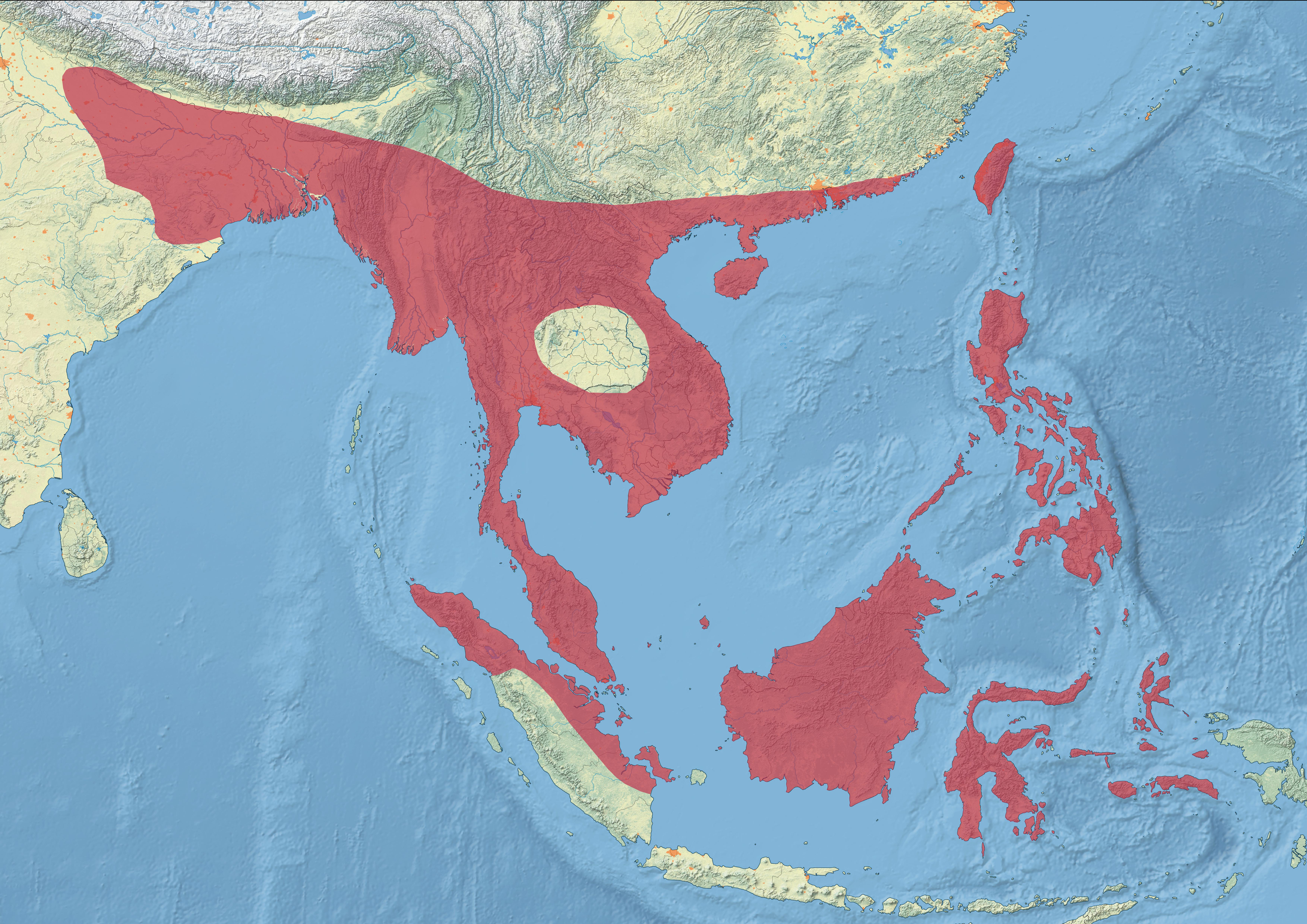
- range

= Chestnut munia =

Species of bird

The chestnut munia or black-headed munia (Lonchura atricapilla) is a small passerine. It was formerly considered conspecific with the closely related tricoloured munia, but is now widely accepted as a separate species. This estrildid finch is a resident breeding bird in Bangladesh, Brunei, Cambodia, China, India, Indonesia, Laos, Malaysia, Burma, Nepal, the Philippines, Singapore, Taiwan, Thailand, Vietnam and Hawaii. It also has been introduced to all the Greater Antilles and Martinique in the Caribbean.

Before 1995, it was the national bird of the Philippines, where it is known in Tagalog as mayang pula ("red maya") because of the brick red patch on the lower back which is visible only when it flies. This distinguishes it from other birds locally called maya, notably the predominantly brownish "mayang simbahan" ("church maya", which specifically refers to the Eurasian tree sparrow) which is more common in urban areas.

== Subspecies ==
The chestnut munia has seven subspecies accepted:

- Lonchura atricapilla rubronigra (Hodgson, 1836)
- Lonchura atricapilla atricapilla (Vieillot, 1807)
- Lonchura atricapilla deignani Parkes, 1958
- Lonchura atricapilla sinensis (Blyth, 1852)
- Lonchura atricapilla batakana (Chasen & Kloss, 1929)
- Lonchura atricapilla formosana (Swinhoe, 1865)
- Lonchura atricapilla jagori (Martens, 1866)

== Description ==
Small, sexes alike, races differ slightly in intensity of colour. In L. a. jagori, the adult has the whole head, breast, centre of belly, and undertail coverts black; the back, wing, and sides of belly chestnut, brighter on underparts, duller on wings; uppertail coverts dark reddish brown, underpart buff; uppertail coverts and tail as adult. Bill silvery grey; eye chestnut; legs gray.

== Habitat ==
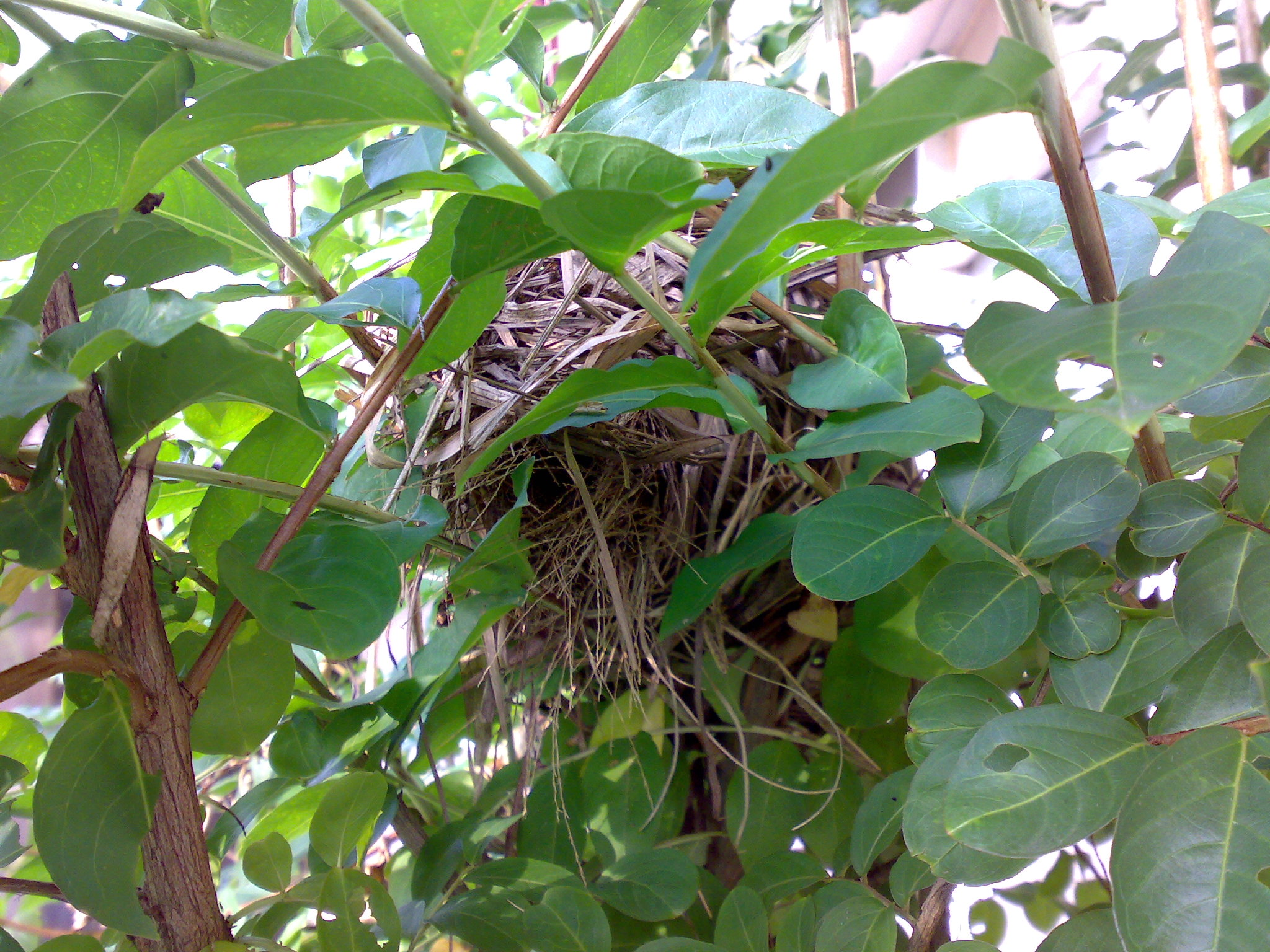
Chestnut munia nest. Nest is dome-shaped; entrance/exit point is visible

The chestnut munia is a small gregarious bird which feeds mainly on grain and other seeds. It frequents open grassland and cultivation. The nest is a large domed grass structure in a bush or tall grass into which 4–7 white eggs are laid.

== Characteristics ==
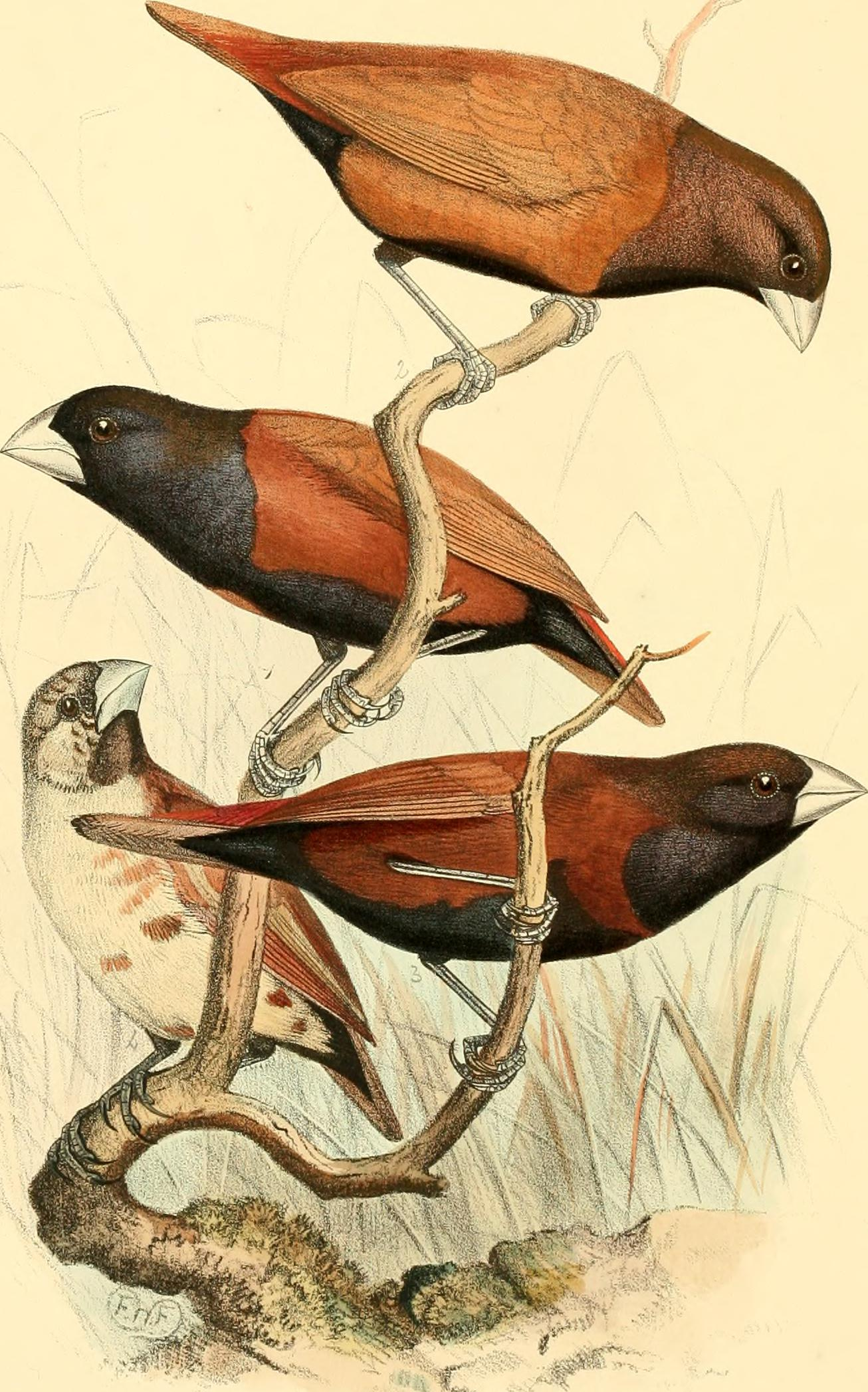
Adult

The chestnut munia is 11–12 cm in length. The adult has a stubby pale grey-blue bill, black head, and brown body, with a brick red patch on the lower back, visible only when it flies. Some races also have a black belly.

The sexes are similar, but immature birds have uniform pale brown upperparts, lack the dark head and have white to pale buff underparts.

== National bird of the Philippines until 1995 ==
The black-headed munia was the national bird of the Philippines until 1995, when that was transferred to the Philippine eagle. There, due to urbanisation and the resulting lack of awareness of local species, it is nowadays often confused for the Eurasian tree sparrow because that species, one of several also categorized as "maya" in the Philippines, is much more common in urban areas.
