= Maya-1 =

First nanosatellite Filipino spacecraft

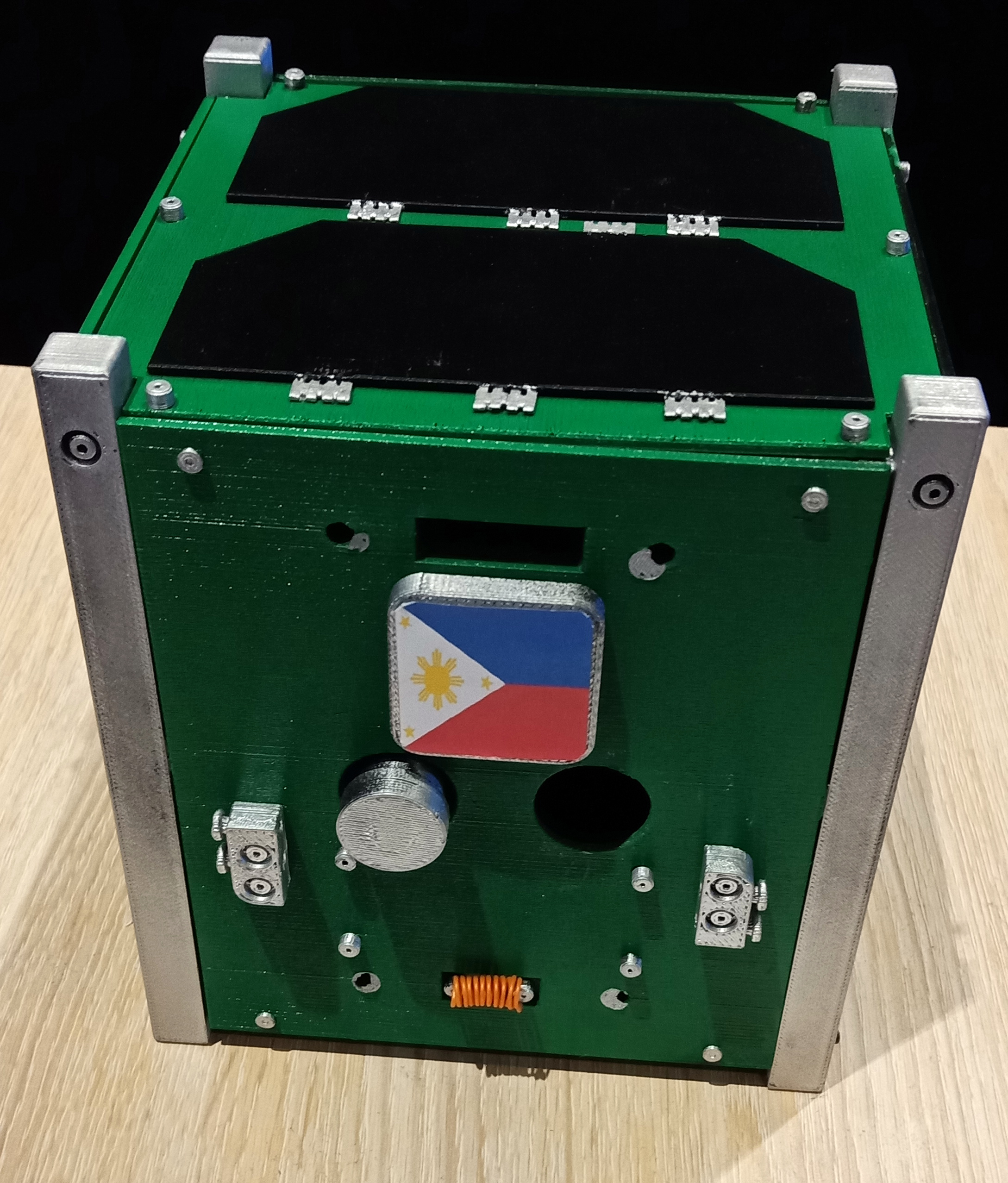
- A model of the satellite
- Mission type: Technology demonstration
- Operator: University of the Philippines
- COSPAR ID: 1998-067PE
- SATCAT no.: 43590
- Website: birds2.birds-project.com phl-microsat.upd.edu.ph
- Mission duration: 6-9 months (planned)

Spacecraft properties
- Spacecraft type: 1U CubeSat
- Manufacturer: University of the Philippines
- Launch mass: 1.11 kg
- Dimensions: 10 × 10 × 11.35 cm

Start of mission
- Launch date: 29 June 2018, 09:42 UTC
- Rocket: Falcon 9 Full Thrust
- Launch site: Cape Canaveral, SLC-40
- Contractor: SpaceX
- Deployed from: ISS
- Deployment date: August 10, 2018

End of mission
- Disposal: Deorbited
- Decay date: November 23, 2020

Orbital parameters
- Reference system: Geocentric orbit
- Regime: Low Earth orbit
- Inclination: 51.6°

Maya-1 was a Filipino nanosatellite. It was developed under the Philippine Scientific Earth Observation Microsatellite program (PHL-Microsat) and was jointly implemented by the University of the Philippines and the Department of Science and Technology as part of the Kyushu Institute of Technology-led multinational second Joint Global Multi-nations Birds Satellite (Birds-2). Maya-1 was the first nanosatellite of the Philippines.

== Background ==
Following the launch of the Diwata-1 microsatellite in 2016, the Philippine Department of Science and Technology (DOST) announced on 29 June 2017 that two satellites, one nanosatellite and one microsatellite, will be launched in 2018. The government agency said that Filipino graduate students, Joven Javier and Adrian Salces attending Kyushu Institute of Technology (KIT), Japan were working on developing a satellite with their mentors which at that time was still to be named.

The satellite, later dubbed as Maya-1, was developed mainly through the second Joint Global Multination Birds Satellite (Birds-2) initiated by the Kyushu Institute of Technology (KIT) in Japan. The project was managed by a team composed of 11 graduate students from Bhutan, Japan, Malaysia, and the Philippines. The two other satellites developed under Birds-2; BHUTAN-1 of Bhutan and UiTMSAT-1 of Malaysia. The first iteration of the project (Birds-1) was a joint effort by Bangladesh, Ghana, Japan, Mongolia, and Nigeria.

The project was also placed under the Philippine Scientific Earth Observation Microsatellite program. The PHL-Microsat team suggested the satellite to be named after the Maya, a local term for a certain varieties of bird in the Philippines. The Maya-1 satellite and its successors are specifically named after the Chestnut munia (Lonchura atricapilla), which is among the bird species locally referred to as the maya, due to its similar size to the satellite with the Chestnut munia known to grow around 12 centimeters (0.39 ft) long.

== Development ==
The Birds-2 project commenced in November 2016. Maya-1 was designed by PHL-Microsat scholars and KIT graduate students Joven Javier and Adrian Salces. Javier was pursuing a master's degree while Salces was pursuing a doctorate degree.

Javier, who was also the overall project manager of Birds-2, served as the Electronics PCB Designer of Maya-1 while Salces was responsible for developing the satellite's Ground Station Segment and Communication Subsystem.

The satellite was classified as a 1U CubeSat. It measured 10 × 10 × 11.35 cm and weighed 1.11 kilograms (2.4 lb). Maya-1 took fifteen months to build.

== Instruments ==
Maya-1 was built using components which are commercially available that were determined safe to use in space. The satellite, along with BHUTAN-1 and UiTMSAT-1, was equipped with Automatic Packet Reporting System digipeater. This equipment was used to demonstrate communication relay capabilities of the three satellites. Maya-1 was also equipped with a Global Positioning System chip and a magnetometer, the latter being used in measuring magnetic fields in space.

== Launch and mission ==
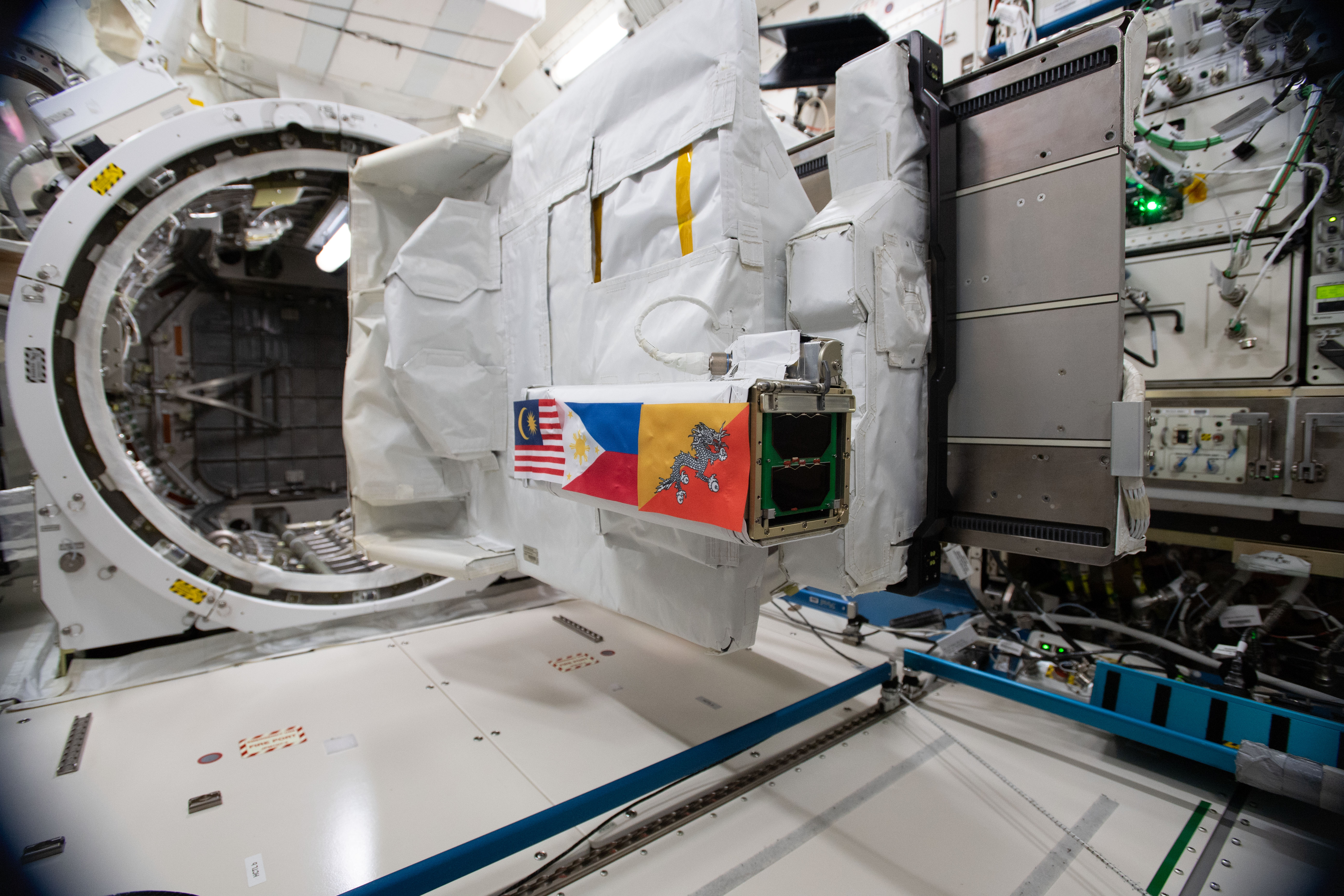
Birds-2 in the JEM Small Satellite Orbital Deployer.

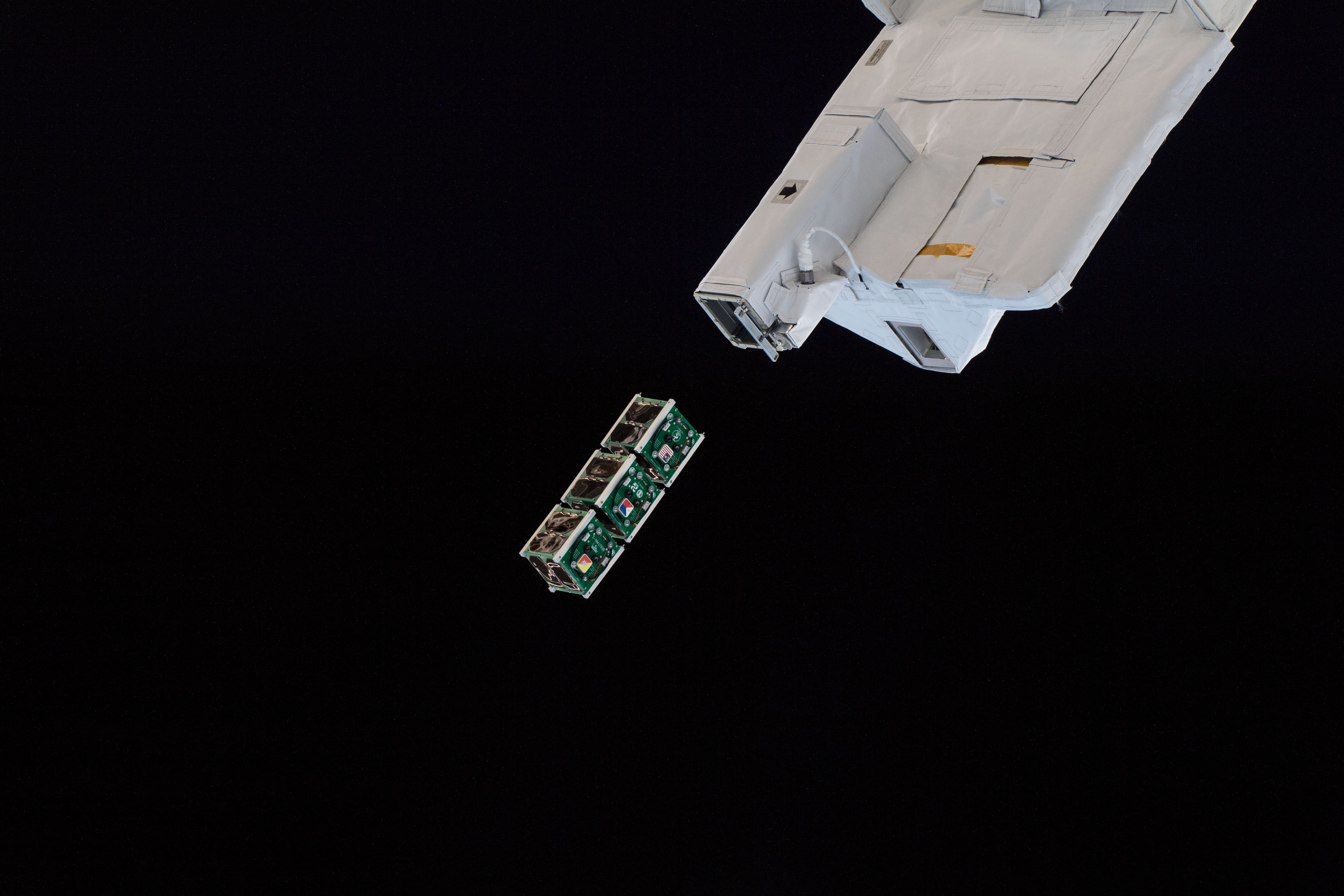
Birds-2 satellites deployed from the Kibō module.

Maya-1 was launched to space on 29 June 2018, via the Falcon 9 Full Thrust rocket at Cape Canaveral in Florida, United States as part of the SpaceX CRS-15 Commercial Resupply Service mission. BHUTAN-1 and UiTMSAT-1 which were also developed under the Birds-2 project were also among the payload of the rocket. Maya-1, along with the two other satellites were deployed from the International Space Station (ISS) on 10 August 2018 through the Japanese Kibō module on the ISS. They orbited approximately at the same altitude as the ISS at about 400 kilometres (250 mi). A few days after their deployment, amateur ground stations from ten participating nations of the Birds project confirmed communication with the three satellites.

While built solely by Filipinos, the satellite was jointly controlled and operated by the Philippines, Bhutan, and Malaysia. The combined cost to build and launch Maya-1 was around US$150,000 (₱8 million). The mission of Maya-1 was "experimental testing of commercial apparatus" and due to its size, it was to provide "a cost-effective educational platform" to help Filipinos build future satellites. The satellite could also be used to relay messages in the event typhoons render cellular services unavailable.

The satellite was initially projected to be operational from about six to 9 months. However Maya-1 remained in orbit for two years and four months with its operations ending on November 23, 2020, when it re-entered Earth's atmosphere.
