= SpaceX CRS-15 =

2018 American resupply spaceflight to the ISS

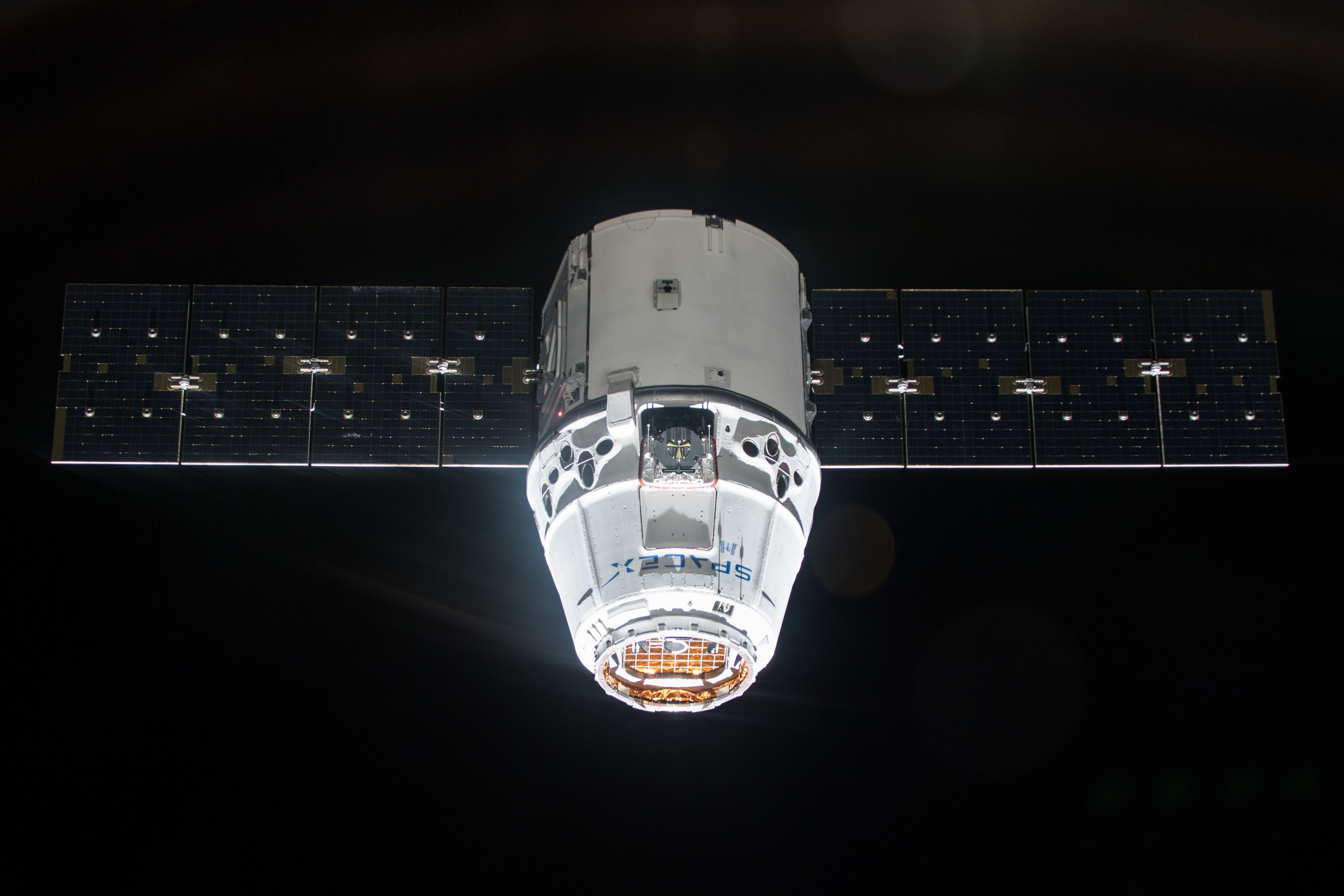
- Dragon spacecraft on approach to ISS
- Names: SpX-15
- Mission type: ISS resupply
- Operator: SpaceX
- COSPAR ID: 2018-055A
- SATCAT no.: 43522
- Mission duration: 35 days, 12 hours, 35 minutes

Spacecraft properties
- Spacecraft: Dragon 1 C111
- Spacecraft type: Dragon 1
- Manufacturer: SpaceX
- Dry mass: 4,200 kg (9,300 lb)
- Dimensions: Height: 6.1 m (20 ft); Diameter: 3.7 m (12 ft)

Start of mission
- Launch date: 29 June 2018, 09:42 UTC
- Rocket: Falcon 9 Full Thrust Block 4 B1045-2
- Launch site: Cape Canaveral, SLC-40
- Contractor: SpaceX

End of mission
- Disposal: Recovered
- Landing date: 3 August 2018, 22:17 UTC
- Landing site: Pacific Ocean off Baja California

Orbital parameters
- Reference system: Geocentric
- Regime: Low Earth
- Inclination: 51.6°

Berthing at ISS
- Berthing port: Harmony nadir
- RMS capture: 2 July 2018, 10:54 UTC
- Berthing date: 2 July 2018, 13:50 UTC
- Unberthing date: 3 August 2018
- RMS release: 3 August 2018, 16:38 UTC
- Time berthed: 31 days

Cargo
- Mass: 2,697 kg (5,946 lb)
- Pressurised: 1,712 kg (3,774 lb)
- Unpressurised: 985 kg (2,172 lb)
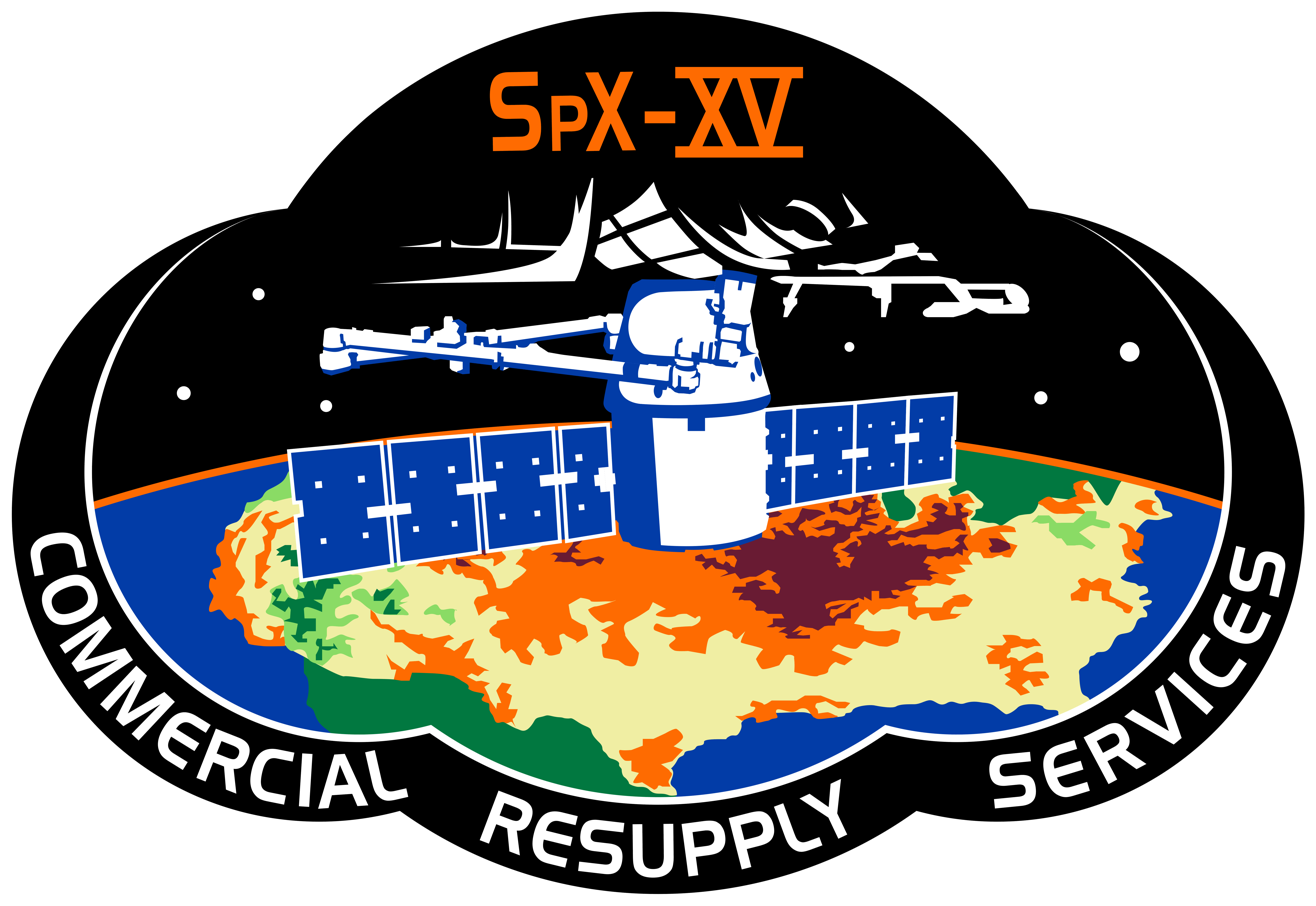
- NASA SpX-15 mission patch Commercial Resupply Services Cargo Dragon

SpaceX CRS-15, also known as SpX-15, was a Commercial Resupply Service mission to the International Space Station launched 29 June 2018 aboard a Falcon 9 rocket. The mission was contracted by NASA and flown by SpaceX.

== Launch ==
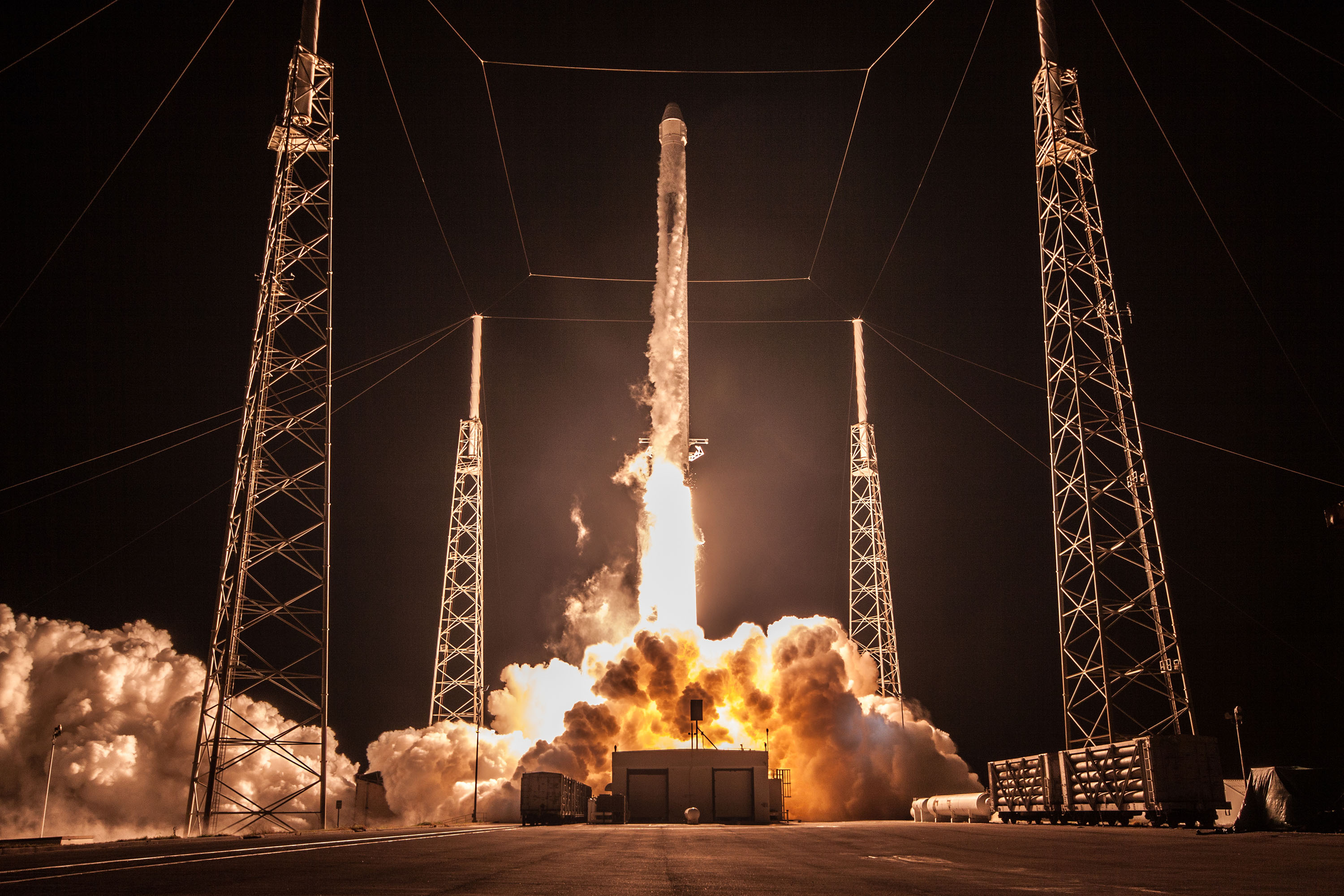
Launch of CRS-15

In early 2015, NASA awarded a contract extension to SpaceX for three additional CRS missions (CRS-13 to CRS-15). In June 2016, a NASA Inspector General report had this mission manifested for April 2018, but this was pushed back, first to 6 June, to 9 June, to 28 June and finally to 29 June 2018.

The mission launched on 29 June 2018 at 09:42 UTC aboard a Falcon 9 rocket from Cape Canaveral Air Force Station Launch Complex 40. The SpaceX Dragon spacecraft rendezvoused with the International Space Station on 2 July 2018. It was captured by the Canadarm2 at 10:54 UTC and was berthed to the Harmony node at 13:50 UTC. On 3 August 2018, Dragon was released from ISS at 16:38 UTC and deorbited, splashing down in the Pacific Ocean approximately 5 hours later at 22:17 UTC, returning more than 1,700 kg (3,748 lb) of cargo to Earth.

It is reported that the Dragon spacecraft may have experienced some parachute anomaly during its flight to the ISS, but it did not prevent the capsule from successful splashdown.

== Payload ==
NASA contracted for the CRS-15 mission from SpaceX and therefore determined the primary payload, date/time of launch, and orbital parameters for the Dragon space capsule. According to a NASA mission overview, CRS-15 carried a total of 2,697 kg (5,946 lb) of total cargo, divided between 1,712 kg (3,774 lb) of pressurized material and 985 kg (2,172 lb) of unpressurized cargo. The external payloads manifested for this flight were ECOSTRESS and a Latching End Effector for Canadarm2. CubeSats included on this flight were three Biarri-Squad satellites built by Boeing for a multinational partnership led by the U.S. National Reconnaissance Office, and three satellites making up the Japanese-sponsored Birds-2 program: BHUTAN-1 from Bhutan, Maya-1 from the Philippines, and UiTMSAT-1 from Malaysia. Furthermore, it contained an interactive artwork by artist Nahum entitled The Contour of Presence, a collaboration with the International Space University, Space Application Services and the European Space Agency.

The following is a breakdown of cargo bound for the ISS:

- Science investigations: 1,233 kg (2,718 lb)
- Crew supplies: 205 kg (452 lb)
- Vehicle hardware: 178 kg (392 lb)
- Spacewalk equipment: 63 kg (139 lb)
- Computer resources: 21 kg (46 lb)
- Russian hardware: 12 kg (26 lb)
- External payloads: 985 kg (2,172 lb)
  - ECOSTRESS: 550 kg (1,213 lb)
  - Latching End Effector: 435 kg (959 lb)

== Gallery ==
SpaceX CRS-15
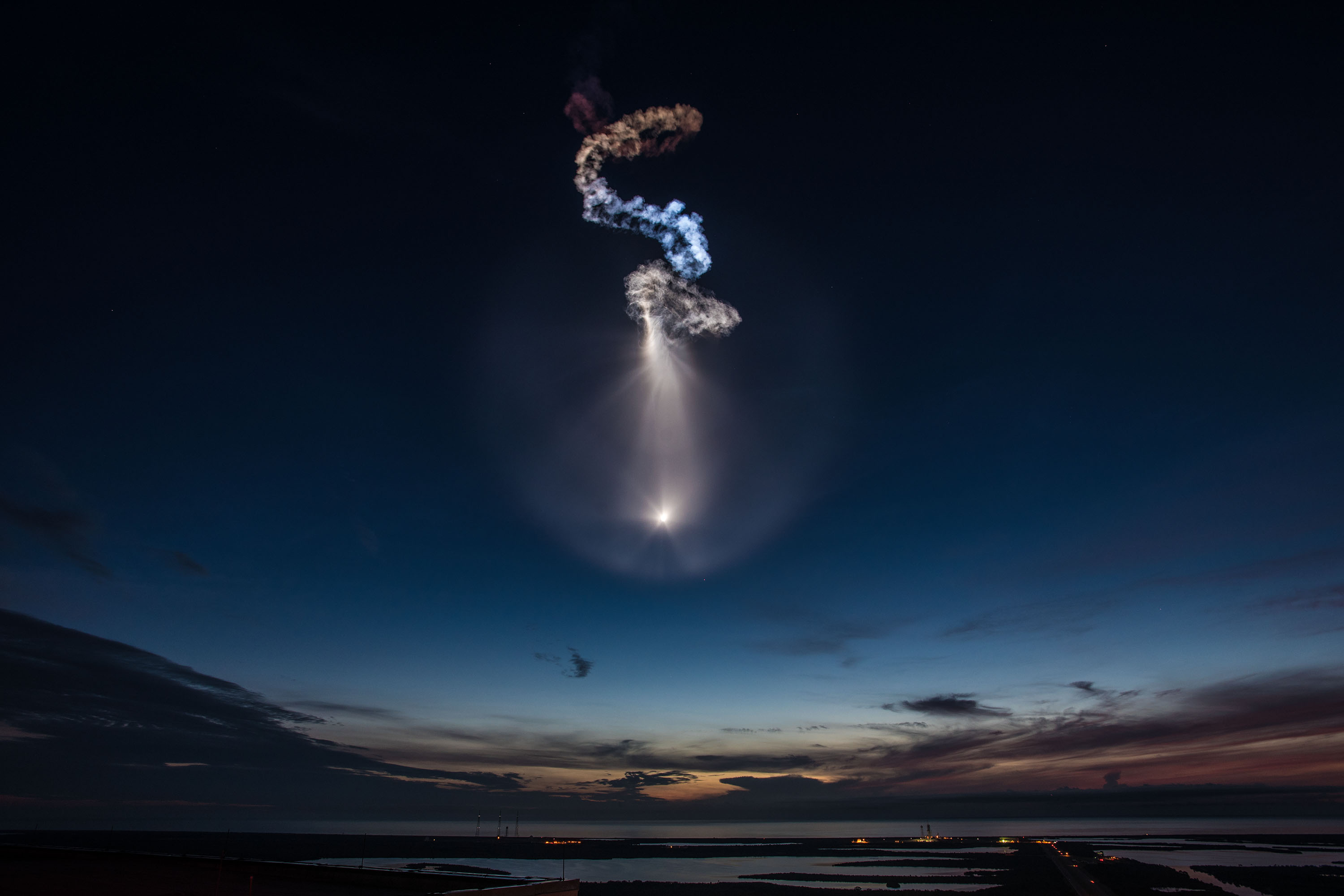
CRS-15 ascending into space

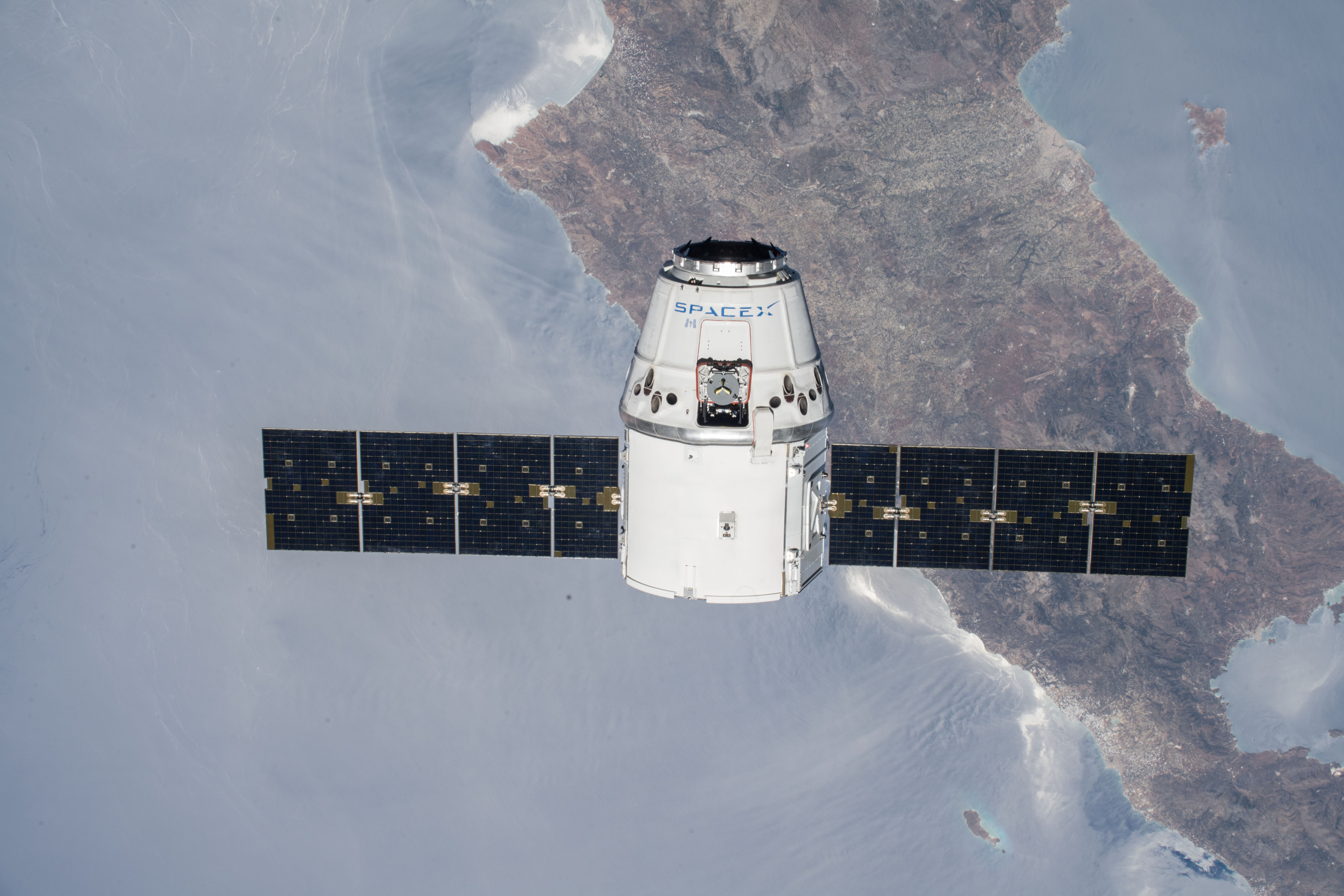
Dragon approaching the ISS

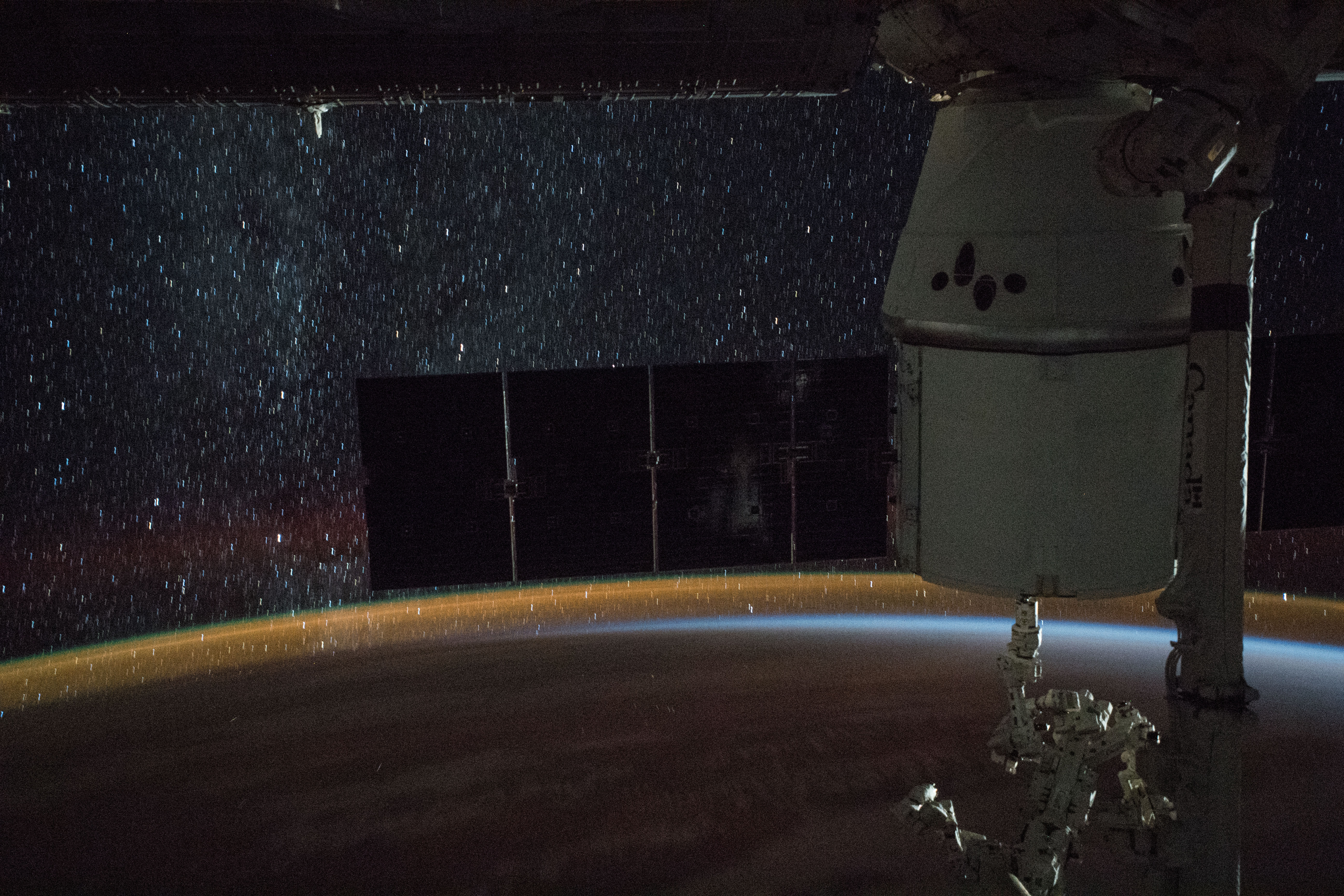
Dragon docked to the ISS

== See also ==
- Uncrewed spaceflights to the International Space Station
- List of Falcon 9 and Falcon Heavy launches
- 2018 in spaceflight
- Artworks launched into space
- Birds-2
