= UiTMSAT-1 =

First nanosatellite Malaysian spacecraft

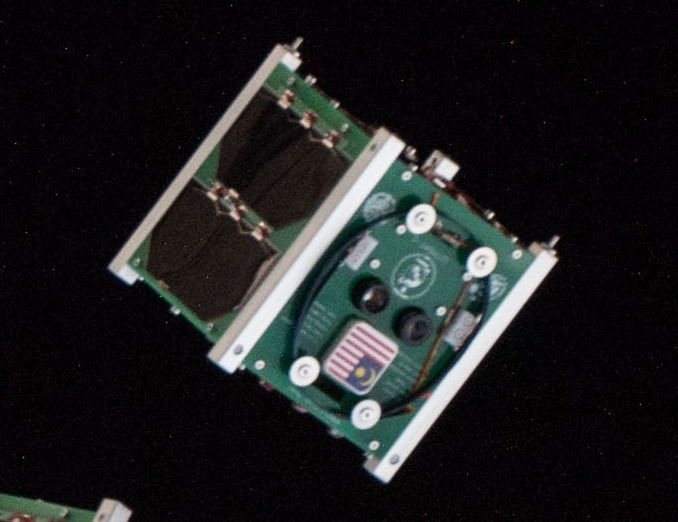
- UiTMSAT-1 in Space
- Mission type: Technology demonstration
- Operator: Universiti Teknologi MARA
- COSPAR ID: 1998-067PD
- SATCAT no.: 43589
- Website: birds2.birds-project.com
- Mission duration: 6-9 months (planned)

Spacecraft properties
- Spacecraft type: 1U CubeSat
- Manufacturer: Universiti Teknologi MARA
- Launch mass: 1.11 kg
- Dimensions: 10 × 10 × 10 cm

Start of mission
- Launch date: 29 June 2018, 09:42 UTC
- Rocket: Falcon 9 Full Thrust
- Launch site: Cape Canaveral, SLC-40
- Contractor: SpaceX
- Deployed from: International Space Station
- Deployment date: 10 August 2018

End of mission
- Decay date: 20 November 2020

Orbital parameters
- Reference system: Geocentric orbit
- Regime: Low Earth orbit
- Perigee altitude: 398.6 km
- Apogee altitude: 407.2 km
- Inclination: 51.6°
- Period: 92.5 minutes

UiTMSAT-1 was a Malaysian nanosatellite, built primarily by Universiti Teknologi MARA (UiTM) as part of the multi-nation Birds-2 project. The 1U CubeSat was launched into space on 29 June 2018 and deployed from the International Space Station (ISS) on 10 August 2018.

== Background ==
Malaysia has had several satellites in orbit, beginning with the MEASAT constellation, first operational in 1996. Their first microsatellite, TiungSAT-1, was launched in 2000.

== Development ==
Planning for the mission began in December 2016 at the Kyushu Institute of Technology (KIT). UiTM postgraduate students Syazana Basyirah Mohammad Zaki and Muhammad Hasif Azami developed the satellite over a 19-month period and collaborated with eight other students from the Philippines, Bhutan, and Japan. This collaboration also inspired the creation of a new Communication Satellite Centre at Universiti Teknologi MARA (UiTM).

== Objectives ==
- Demonstrate an Automatic Packet Reporting System digipeater to communicate with amateur radio stations.
- Detect a specific type of solar radiation called "single event latch-up".
- Measure magnetic fields through the use of an Anisotropic Magneto Resistance Magnetometer.
- Act as an Earth Imaging Camera.

== Launch and mission ==
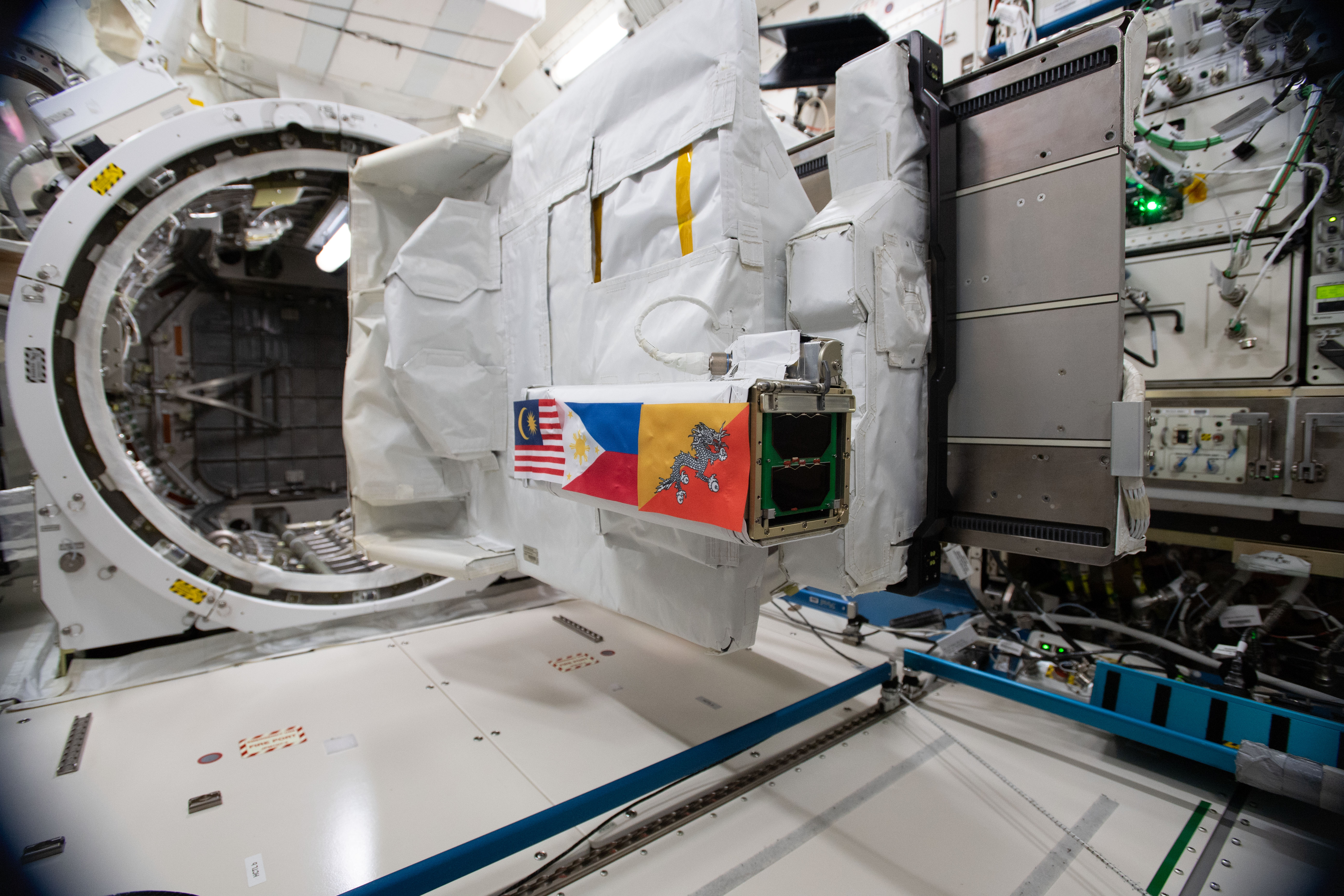
Birds-2 in the JEM Small Satellite Orbital Deployer.

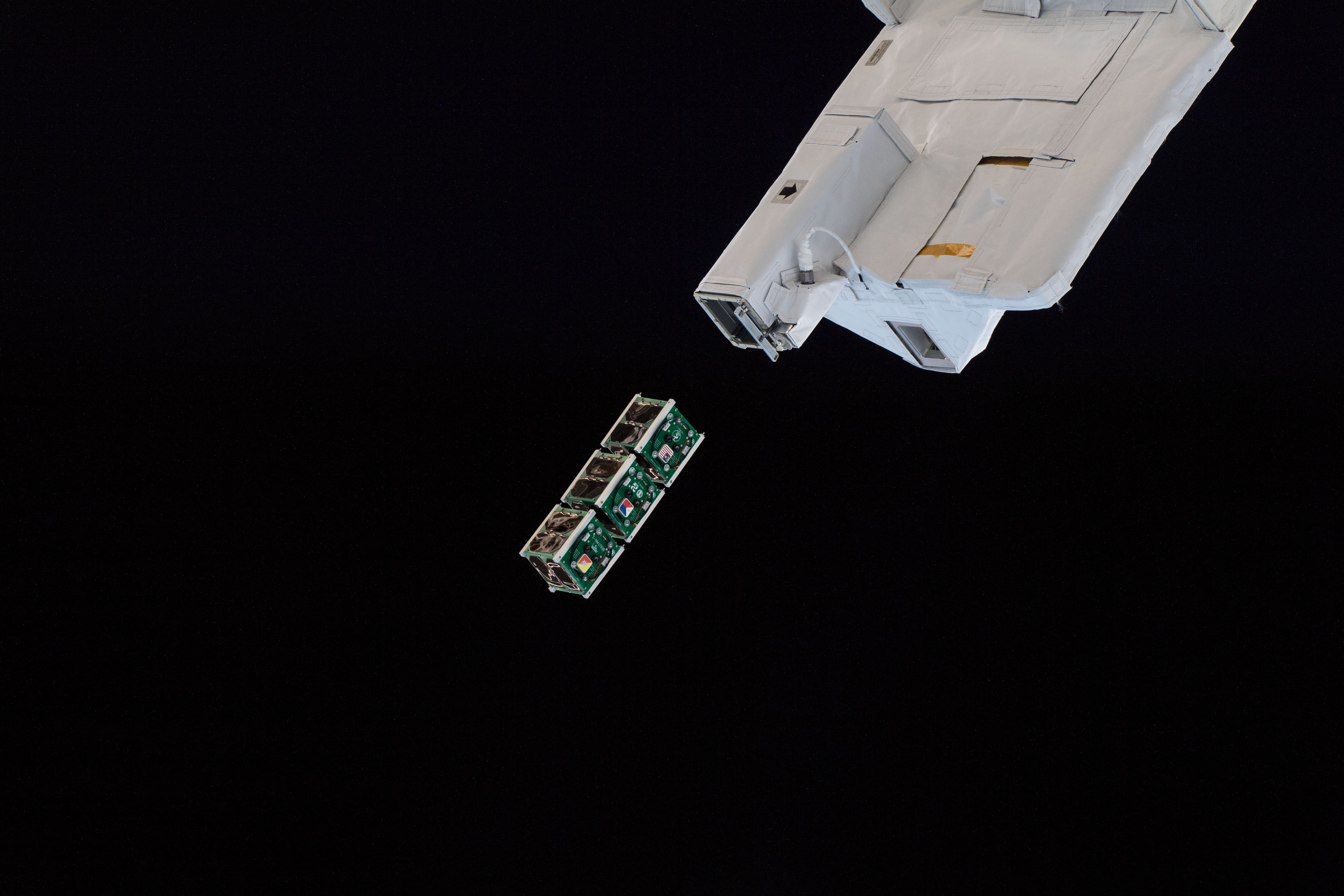
Birds-2 satellites deployed from the Kibō module.

UiTMSAT-1 was launched to space on 29 June 2018 by the Falcon 9 Full Thrust rocket at Cape Canaveral in Florida, United States as part of the SpaceX CRS-15 Commercial Resupply Service mission. Maya-1 and BHUTAN-1, which were also developed under the Birds-2 project, were among the payload of the rocket. All three nanosatellites were deployed from the International Space Station (ISS) and achieved orbit on 10 August 2018.
