= Birds-2 =

Multinational satellite project

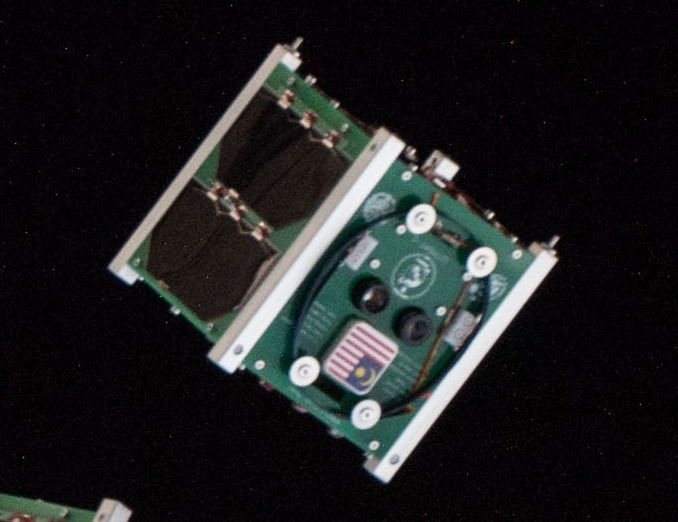
UiTMSAT-1 nanosatellite in space

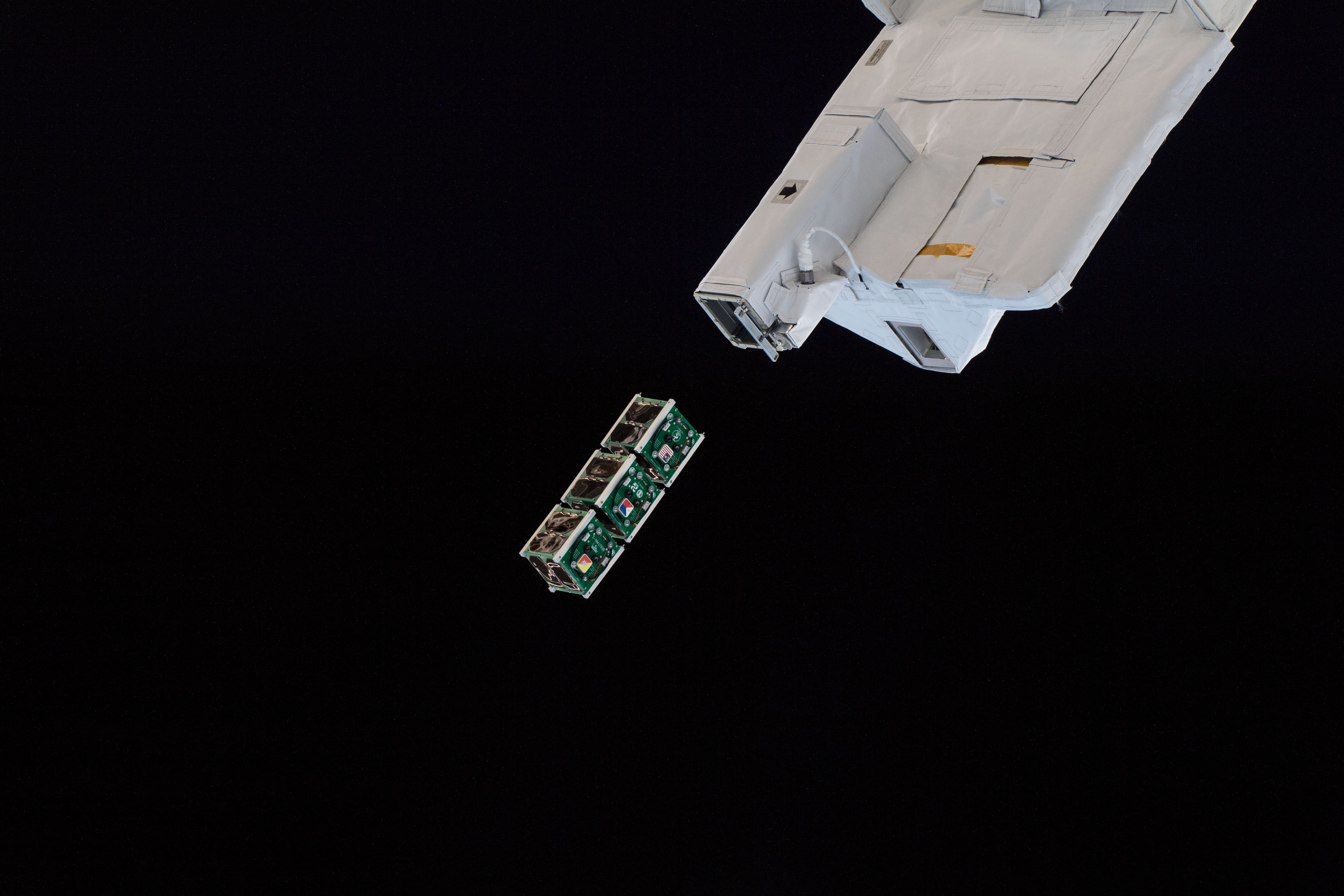
Birds-2 deployed from the ISS.

Birds-2 is the second iteration of a multinational program called the Joint Global Multi-Nations Birds Satellite project, or Birds project, to help countries build their first satellite. The Japanese Kyushu Institute of Technology (KIT) supported the design and fabrication of the satellites. The satellites were launched by the Falcon 9 Full Thrust rocket as a part of the SpaceX CRS-15 mission on 29 June 2018. The satellites were released from the Kibō module of the International Space Station (ISS) in August 2018.

== Description ==
The Kyushu Institute of Technology (KIT) in Japan supports non-spacefaring countries to build their first satellite through a program called the Joint Global Multi-Nations Birds Satellite project (Birds). Five countries had their satellites successfully launched in the Birds-1 flight: Japan, Ghana, Mongolia, Nigeria, and Bangladesh. Three countries participated in the Birds-2 program: Bhutan, the Philippines, and Malaysia. UiTMSAT-1 was Malaysia's first university-built satellite. Bhutan's satellite, BHUTAN-1, was the country's first satellite. The Philippines built their first cubesat, Maya-1.

All three satellites were built identically, and were designed to last 6–9 months. The satellites have camera systems for imaging the Earth. Amateur radio operators can receive data transmitted from the satellites. Each country's receiving station can receive data from all three satellites with a store and forward (S&F) system.

The constellation was launched in SpaceX's Dragon spacecraft, lofted into space with their Falcon 9 rocket. It was the 15th launch of the Cargo Resupply Mission (CRS) contract to the International Space Station (ISS). Dragon was captured by Canadarm2 and docked with the space station on 2 July 2018. The satellites were released from the Kibō module of the International Space Station in August 2018.
