= BHUTAN-1 =

First Bhutanese nanosatellite

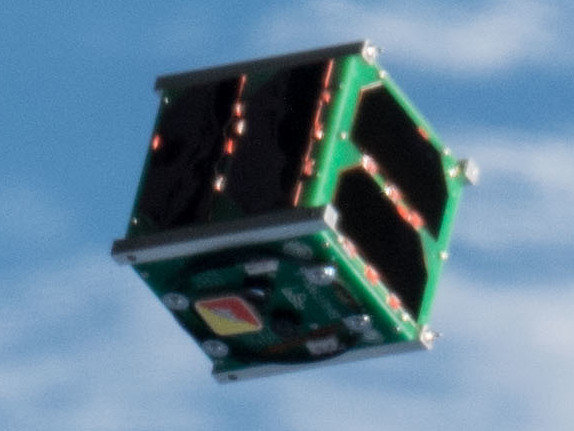
- BHUTAN-1 above Earth
- Names: BIRD-BT
- Mission type: Technology demonstration
- Operator: Kyushu Institute of Technology
- COSPAR ID: 1998-067PF
- SATCAT no.: 43591
- Website: birds2.birds-project.com
- Mission duration: 6-9 months (planned) 27 months (achieved)

Spacecraft properties
- Spacecraft type: 1U CubeSat
- Manufacturer: Kyushu Institute of Technology
- Launch mass: 1.11 kg
- Dimensions: 10 × 10 × 11.35 cm

Start of mission
- Launch date: 29 June 2018, 09:42 UTC
- Rocket: Falcon 9 Full Thrust
- Launch site: Cape Canaveral, SLC-40
- Contractor: SpaceX
- Deployed from: International Space Station
- Deployment date: 10 August 2018

End of mission
- Disposal: Decay from orbit
- Decay date: 18 November 2020

Orbital parameters
- Reference system: Geocentric orbit
- Regime: Low Earth orbit
- Periapsis altitude: 355 km
- Apoapsis altitude: 362 km
- Inclination: 51.64°

BHUTAN-1 was the first Bhutanese nanosatellite to be launched into space. The satellite was built during Kyushu Institute of Technology's Birds-2 program. The Birds program helps countries fly their first satellite. BHUTAN-1 was launched into orbit aboard the SpaceX CRS-15 mission on 29 June 2018. It was deployed from the Kibō module of the International Space Station (ISS) on 10 August 2018. The satellite had cameras to image the Earth.

== Background ==
The Kyushu Institute of Technology (KIT) in Japan supports non-spacefaring countries to build their first satellite through a program called the Joint Global Multi-Nations Birds Satellite project (Birds). Five countries participated in the first Birds program (Birds-1).

In 2016, Bhutanese Prime Minister Tshering Tobgay mentioned plans to set up a space agency with Bhutan's Information and Communications Ministry. According to Tobgay, plans to launch the first Bhutanese satellite to space came from Bhutanese King Jigme Khesar Namgyel Wangchuck.

Three satellites were developed during the Birds-2 program: BHUTAN-1 (Bhutan), UiTMSAT-1 (Malaysia) and Maya-1 (Philippines). BHUTAN-1 was designed by Bhutanese graduate students who were pursuing their master's degree at Kyutech (Kyushu Institute of Technology). The satellite was developed under the Kyushu Institute of Technology-led second Joint Global Multi-nations Birds Satellite (Birds-2).

== Development ==
The Birds-2 project commenced in November 2016. BHUTAN-1 was classified as a 1U CubeSat and measures 10 × 10 × 11.35 cm and weighs 1.11 kilograms (2.4 lb). The satellite was developed and designed by a team of four Bhutanese engineers. The satellite was part of their master's degree in space engineering at Kyushu Institute of Technology.

The designing and testing of BHUTAN-1 began by March 2017. The functions of each sub-system of the satellite was verified before the first engineering model of BHUTAN-1 was built in June of the same year. By October 2017, the second engineering model was completed and the development of the flight module commenced.

== Mission ==
=== Launch ===
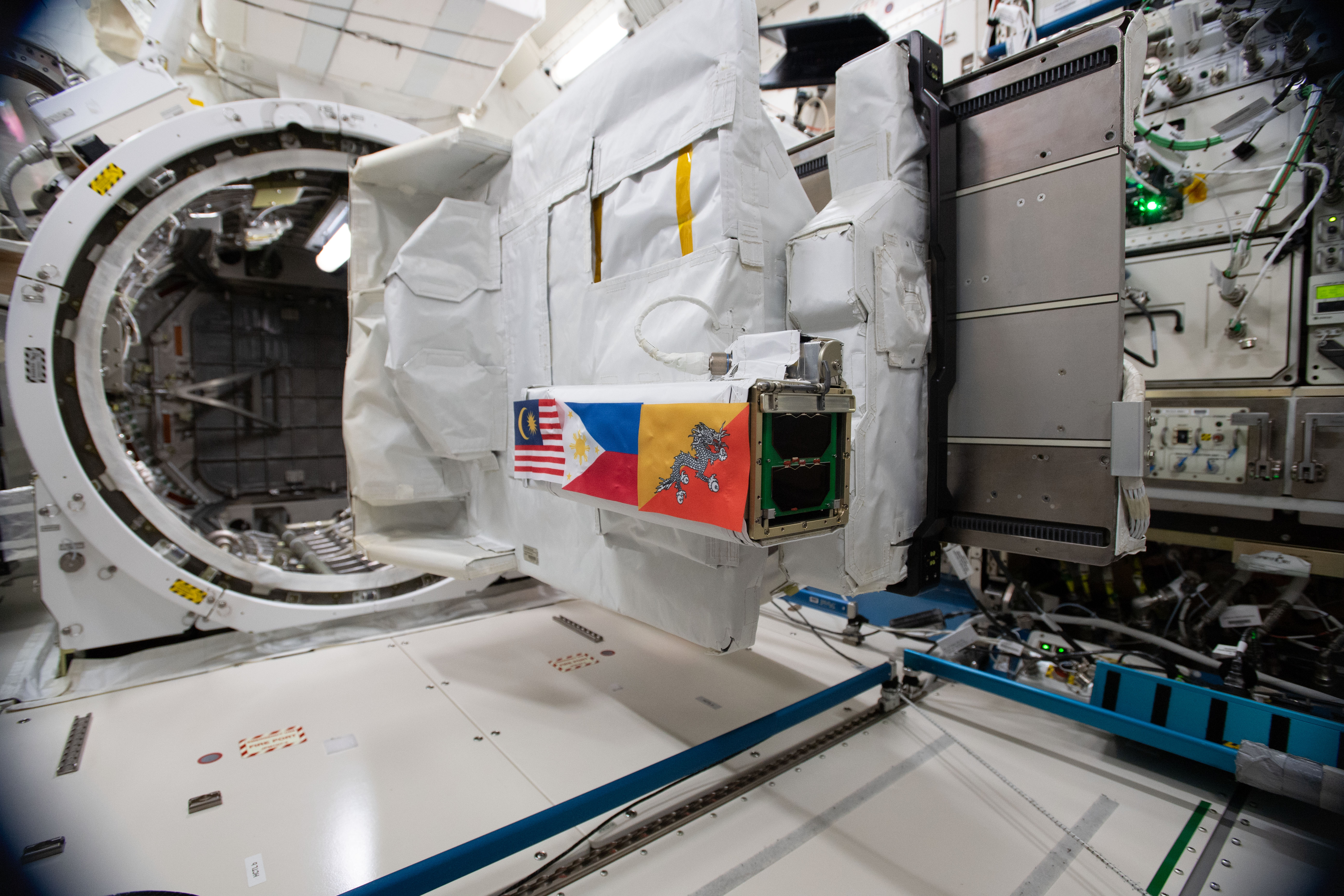
Birds-2 in the JEM Small Satellite Orbital Deployer.

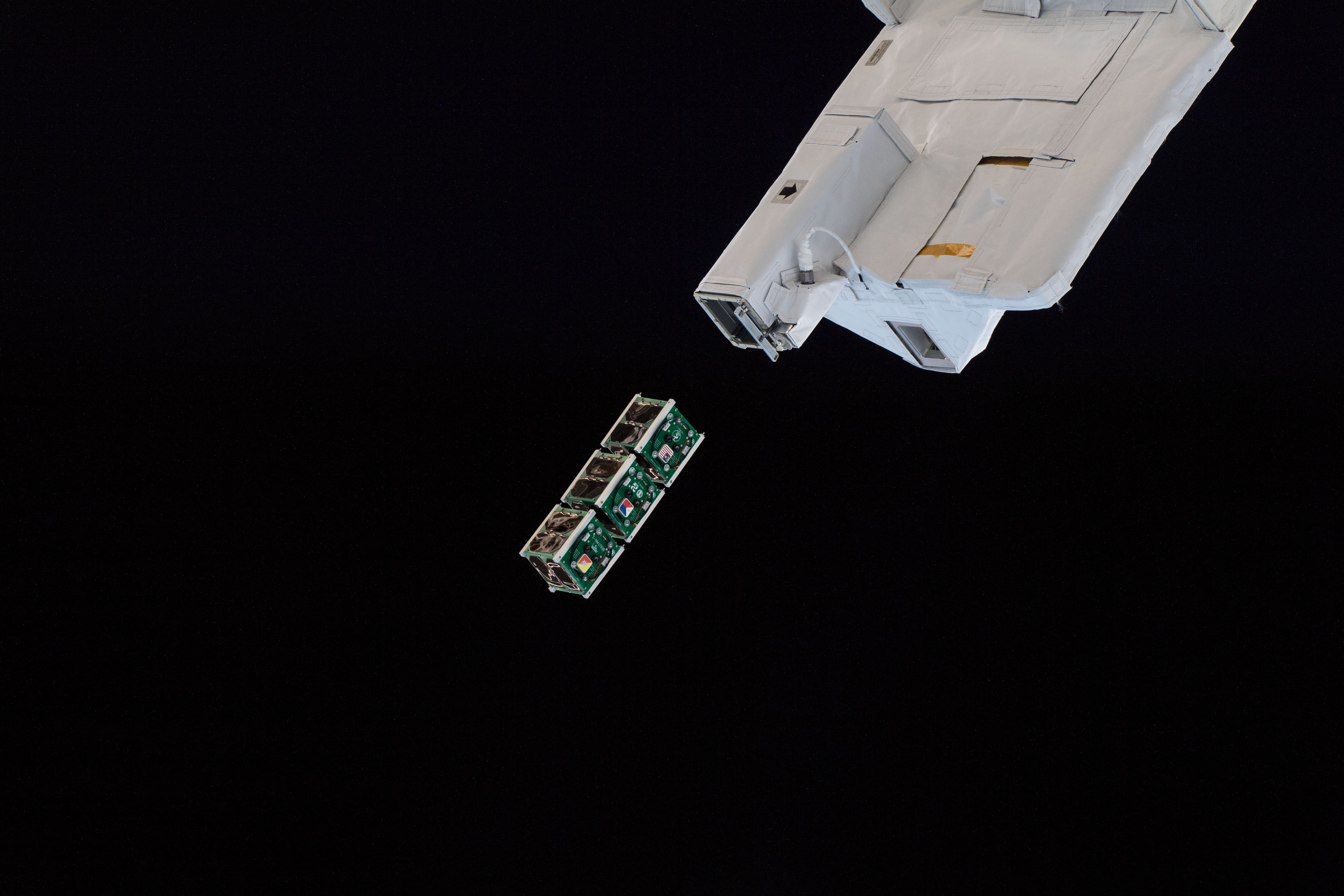
Birds-2 satellites deployed from the Kibō module.

BHUTAN-1 was launched to space on 29 June 2018, via the Falcon 9 Full Thrust rocket at Cape Canaveral in Florida, as part of the SpaceX CRS-15 Commercial Resupply Service mission. Maya-1 and UiTMSAT-1 which were also developed under the Birds-2 project were also among the payload of the rocket. BHUTAN-1 was deployed from Kibō module of the International Space Station (ISS) in August 2018, becoming the first Bhutanese satellite.

=== Operations ===
The satellite operated at an altitude of around 400 km (decaying to lower orbit as time passed) and passed over Bhutan for three to four minutes four to five times per day. Its designed lifespan was six to nine months, though theoretically it could last up to two years. BHUTAN-1's two cameras captured satellite imagery of Bhutan to help assess the country's glaciers, lakes, and forest cover. It also provided basic communication services and was used to study radiation effects on satellites. While BHUTAN-1 was built solely by the Bhutanese, the satellite was jointly controlled and operated by the Bhutan, Malaysia, and Philippines.

BHUTAN-1 was tracked from the ground station operated by the Information and Communications Ministry of Bhutan.
